= Jungfraujoch radio relay station =

Communications installation in Switzerland

Coordinates: 46.545399°N 7.971359°E

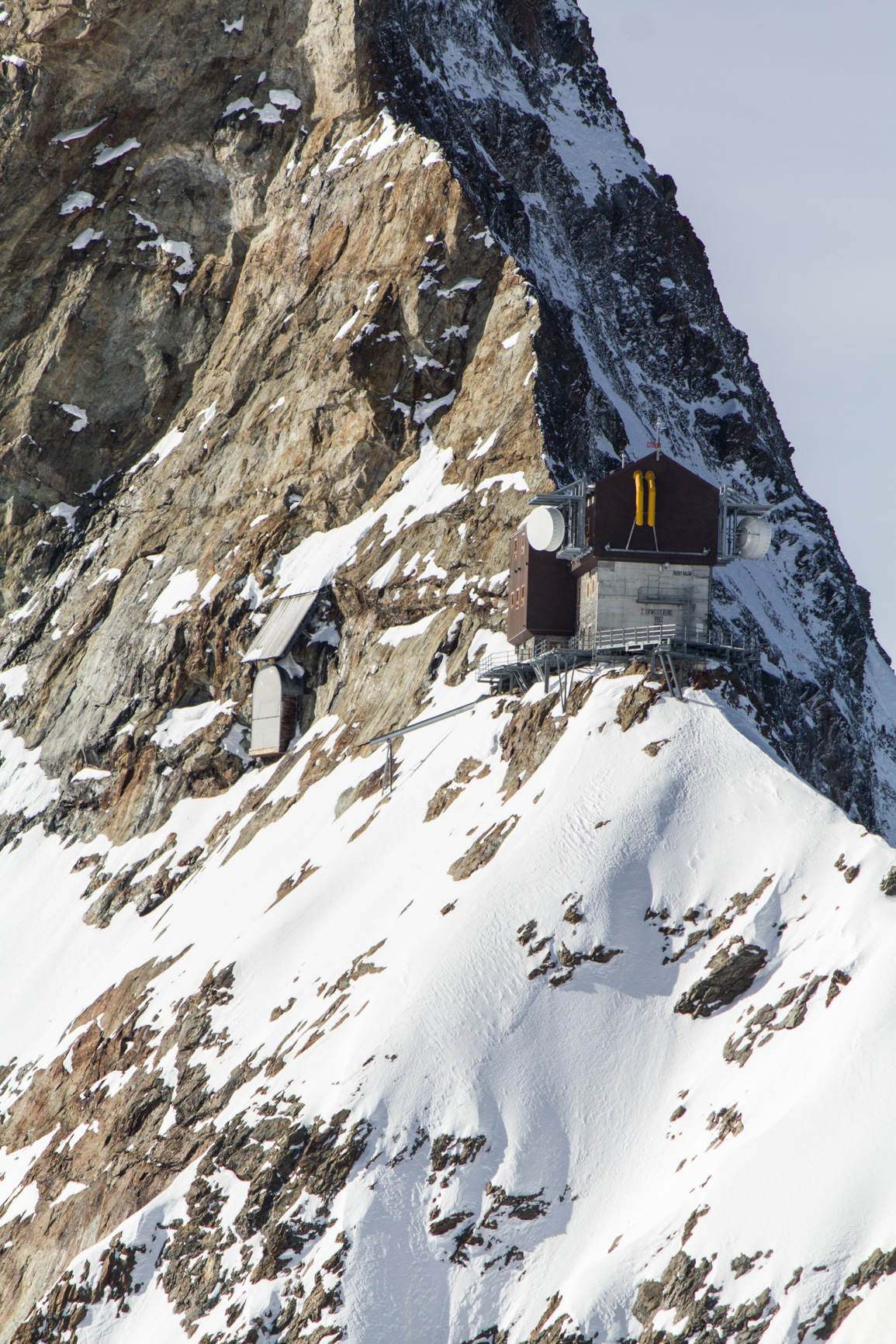
Jungfraujoch radio relay station from the Top of Europe terrace in November 2017.

The Jungfraujoch radio relay station (German: Richtfunkstation Jungfraujoch) is a former Swisscom microwave radio relay station atop the Jungfraujoch, the mountain ridge between Mönch and Jungfrau, in the Swiss Alps. At an altitude of 3,705 meters (12,156 ft) above sea level, it was Europe's highest radio relay station.

Built in 1954, it was the first radio station to allow radio relay connections across the Alps. It has been used to transmit telephone and TV signals, and connected Germany with Italy in the international radio relay network. With the diminishing commercial importance of microwave radio relays due to the increasing availability of satellite and fiber-optic cable links, the station is no longer of practical importance, and Swisscom decided in 2009 to cease operating the station in 2013.

The station building is accessed from the Jungfraujoch railway station by way of a 600 meters (2,000 ft) long tunnel through glacier and rock. The Jungfraubahnen anticipated to be able to reuse the station building, which provides an excellent view to both sides of the ridge, for tourism purposes after the end of radio transmissions in 2013.

== See also ==
- List of buildings and structures above 3000 m in Switzerland
