= Eigerjoch =

Mountain pass in Bern, Switzerland

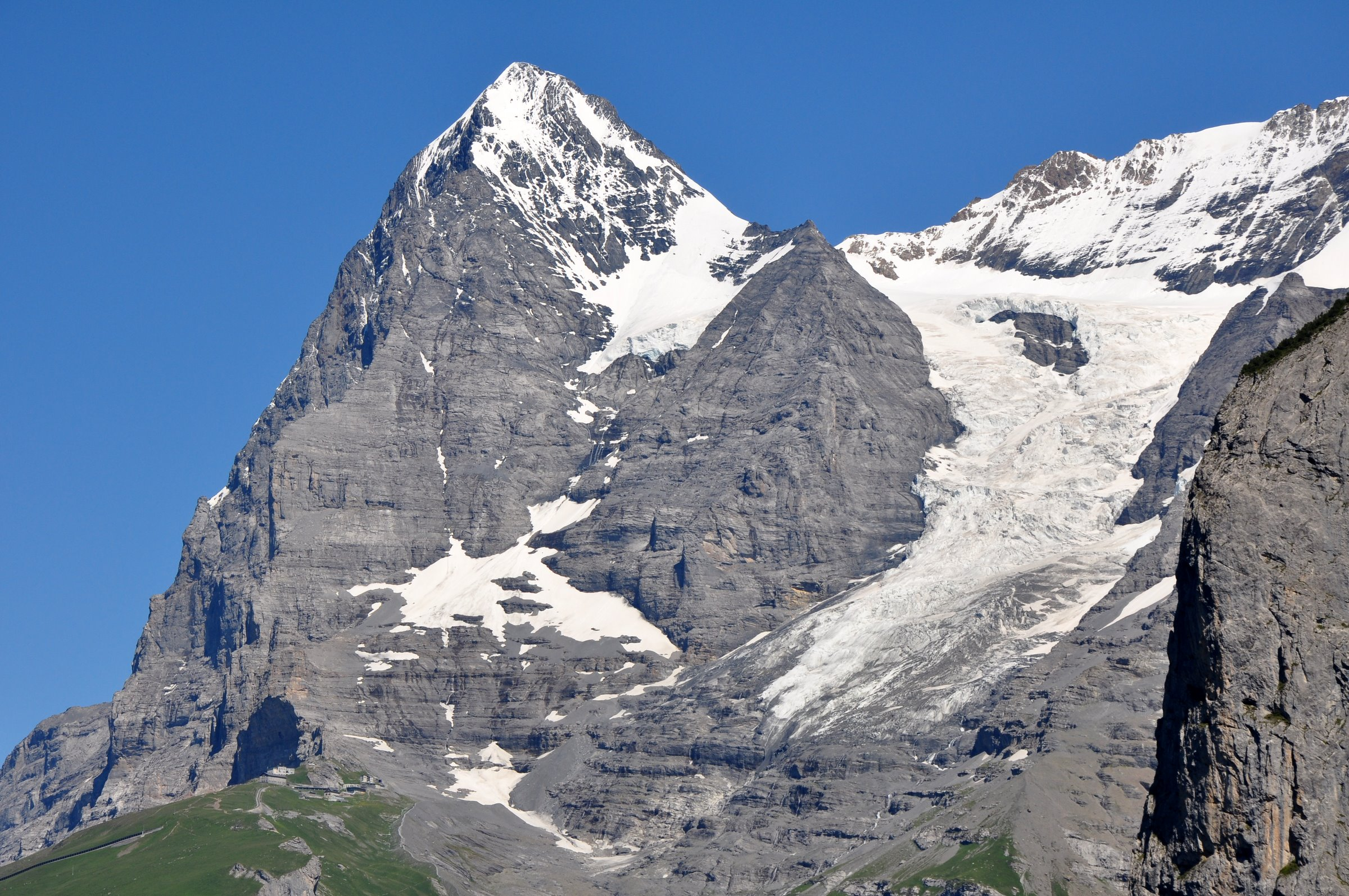
- View from the north side
- Interactive map of Eigerjoch
- Elevation: 3,605 metres (11,827 ft)
- Traversed by: Leslie Stephen and party (1859)

Third Approach
- Location: Bern, Switzerland
- Range: Bernese Alps
- Coordinates: 46°34′20″N 8°00′24″E

The Eigerjoch is a high Alpine pass lying between the Mönch (south) and the Eiger (north). The lowest point (3,605 m) on the ridge is named Nördliches Eigerjoch while another pass (3,747 m) located closer to the Mönch is named Südliches Eigerjoch.

The Eiger does not lie in the ridge of the Bernese Alps which divides the basins of the Rhone and the Aar, but forms a promontory extending north-east from the Mönch, and is connected with it by a long and high arête, in which jagged teeth of rock project through a coating of ice. At the southern end, where this arete abuts against the shoulder of the Mönch, it overlooks the gently-sloping plateau which forms the summit of the Mönchsjoch, and the descent on the side of the Aletsch Glacier presents no serious difficulty.

== First crossing ==
The first crossing was made by Leslie Stephen and W. and G. S. Mathews, with Ulrich Lauener of Lauterbrunnen and J. B. Croz and M. Charlet of Chamonix.

In August 1859, the three enterprising mountaineers above named, failing to perceive any route by which the Jungfraujoch could be attacked with a fair prospect of success, resolved to attempt to pass from the Wengern Alp by the north and east sides of the peak of the Mönch. Starting at 4 a.m. they soon reached the Eiger Glacier, and ascended for some distance along the side nearest to the Eiger. On reaching the very much crevassed middle region of the glacier, some time was lost in the endeavour to force a direct way. The correct course was to cross to the southern bank below the rocks of the Mönch. After a short ascent the form of the crevasses made it expedient to cross back to the opposite side, nearly to the edge of the glacier, here held up by the great rocky buttress of the Eiger, so remarkable from the Wengern Alp. Further progress seemed to be barred by the menacing condition of the seracs; but the difficulties could be avoided by crossing the glacier diagonally a third time to a sort of snow valley, where the crevasses were apparently filled up by avalanches from the Mönch. By this circuitous but not very difficult route the party reached the uppermost plateau of the glacier, lying immediately below the ridge connecting the two peaks. On the side nearest the Monch the ridge was accessible only by extremely long and steep slopes of hard snow. At the end approaching the Eiger the ridge is far easier of access, and this therefore was the first object of attack. On gaining the summit the travellers found themselves at the top of a tremendous precipice overlooking one arm of the Lower Grindelwald Glacier, while the arête to the right connecting them with the Mönch was broken through by so many jagged teeth of rock, and at the same time so narrow and difficult, that many hours would probably have been consumed in passing along it. It was therefore thought expedient to return, and to attempt the ascent by the ice-slope, as it should be called since the névé is so hard and slippery as to make stepcutting very laborious. Ulrich Lauener on that occasion displayed extraordinary strength and endurance, having in 5 hours of uninterrupted work cut 580 steps on an ice slope of from 50 to 52° inclination. That effort sufficed only to enable the party to gain a patch of rock some way below the summit of the ridge, and more than an hour more was expended in reaching the desired goal. Turning to the right along the arête, they finally reached at 6 p.m. the point on the shoulder of the Mönch which forms the summit level of this pass, which was probably the Südliches Eigerjoch.

In descending to the Aletsch Glacier the discoverers of this pass were benighted before they could reach the comparative shelter of the Kaulberg cave, and were forced to pass the night on some exposed rocks at the southern base of the Trugberg, where their position in case of bad weather would have been very critical. The Eggishorn was reached on the following morning about 9 a.m. in about 29 hours trom the Wengern Alp.

== See also ==
- List of mountain passes in Switzerland
