= Rottalhorn =

Mountain in Switzerland

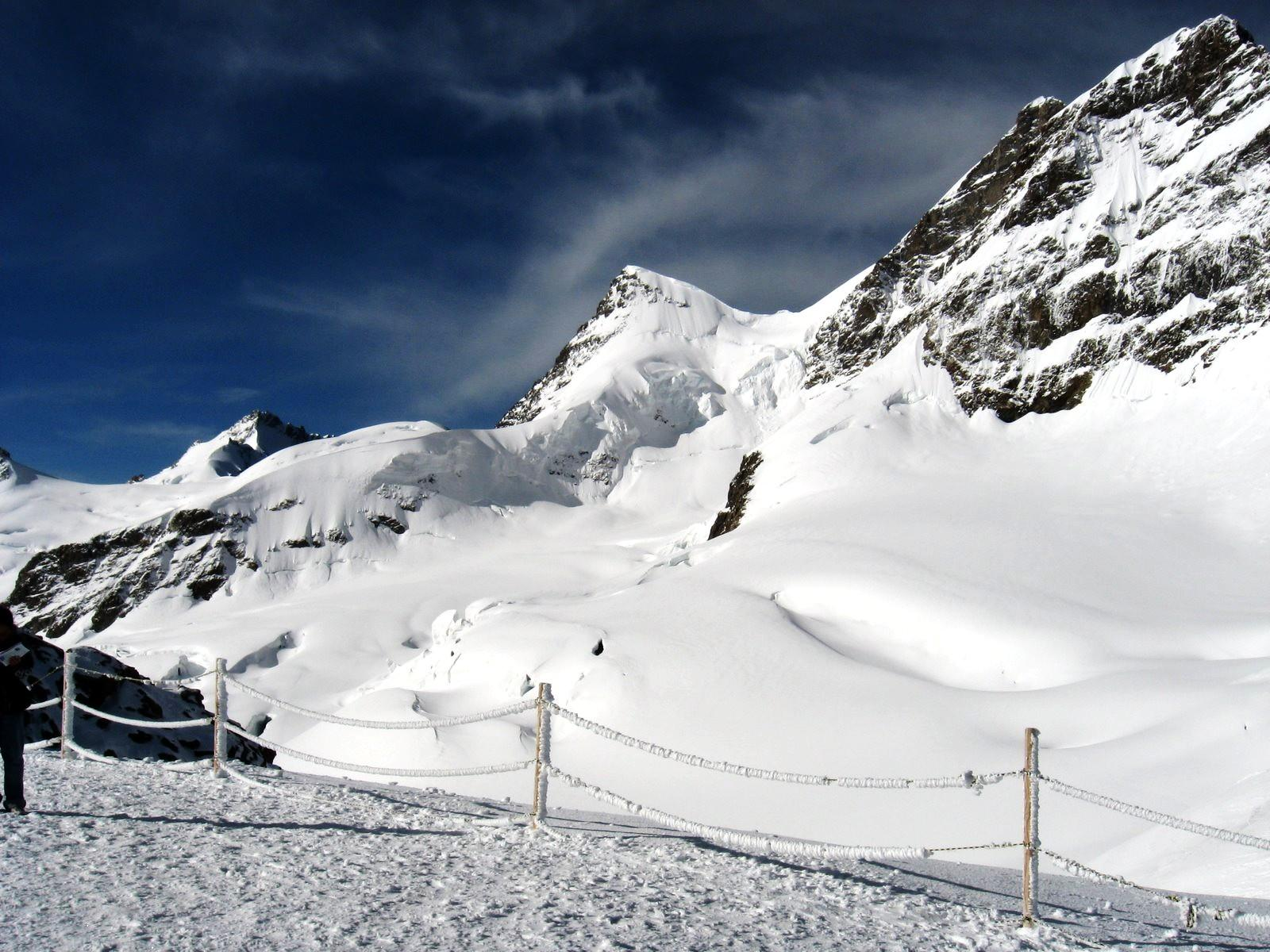
- Rottalhorn and Jungfrau (right), from the Jungfraujoch

Highest point
- Elevation: 3,971 m (13,028 ft)
- Prominence: 91 m (299 ft)
- Parent peak: Jungfrau
- Coordinates: 46°31′55.4″N 7°58′02.3″E

Geography
- Location within Switzerland
- Location: Bern/Valais, Switzerland
- Parent range: Bernese Alps

The Rottalhorn (3,971 m) is a mountain of the Bernese Alps, located on the border between the Swiss cantons of Bern and Valais. It lies 600 m south of the Jungfrau, between the small valley of the Rottal and the Jungfraufirn (part of the Aletsch Glacier).
