= Jungfrau =

Mountain summit in the Bernese Alps, between the Swiss cantons of Bern and Valais

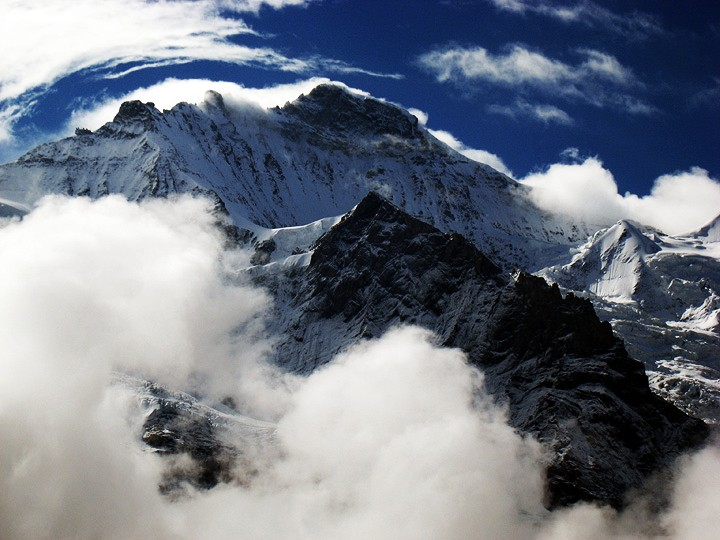
- Western wall of Jungfrau (left) and Wengen-Jungfrau (in the back). In front: Rottalhorn.

Highest point
- Elevation: 4,158 m (13,642 ft)
- Prominence: 694 m (2,277 ft) (Note: Retrieved from the Swisstopo topographic maps. The key col is the Jungfraujoch (3,464 m, 11,365 feet).)
- Parent peak: Finsteraarhorn
- Isolation: 8.2 km (5.1 mi) (Note: Retrieved from Google Earth. The nearest point of higher elevation is north of the Aletschhorn.)
- Coordinates: 46°32′12.5″N 7°57′45.5″E

Naming
- English translation: Maiden, Virgin, Young Woman
- Language of name: German

Geography
- Location within Switzerland Location within Canton of Bern Location within Canton of Valais Location within Alps
- Country: Switzerland
- Cantons: Bern; Valais
- Parent range: Bernese Alps
- Topo map: Swisstopo 1249 Finsteraarhorn

Climbing
- First ascent: 3 August 1811 by J. Meyer, H. Meyer, A. Volken, J. Bortis
- Easiest route: basic snow/ice climb

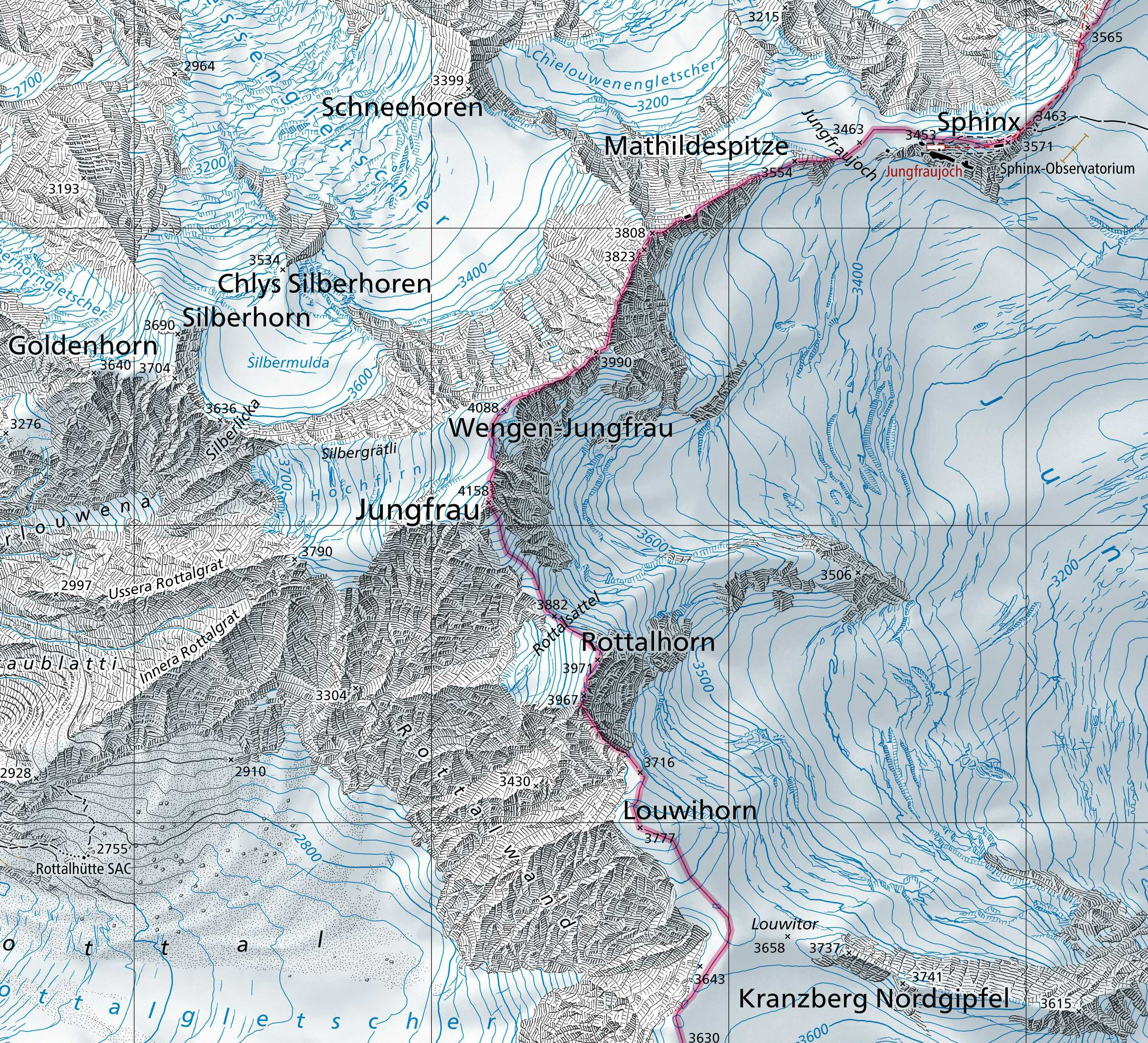
Swiss national map 1:25,000, sheet 1249 Finsteraarhorn

The Jungfrau (/ˈjʊŋfraʊ/ YOONG-frow), (Note: Swiss Standard German pronunciation: [ˈjʊŋfraʊ]) at 4,158 m (13,642 ft) is one of the main summits of the Bernese Alps, located between the southern canton of Bern and the northern canton of Valais, halfway between Interlaken and Fiesch. Together with the Eiger and Mönch, the Jungfrau forms a massive wall of mountains overlooking the Bernese Oberland and the Swiss Plateau, one of the most distinctive sights of the Swiss Alps.

The summit was first reached on 3 August 1811, by the Meyer brothers of Aarau and two chamois hunters from Valais. The ascent followed a long expedition over the glaciers and high passes of the Bernese Alps. It was not until 1865 that a more direct route on the northern side was opened.

The construction of the Jungfrau Railway in the early 20th century, which connects Kleine Scheidegg to the Jungfraujoch, the saddle between the Mönch and the Jungfrau, made the area one of the most-visited places in the Alps. Along with the Aletsch Glacier to the south, the Jungfrau is part of the Jungfrau-Aletsch area, which was declared a World Heritage Site in 2001.

== Etymology ==
The name Jungfrau ('maiden, virgin'), which refers to the highest of the three prominent mountains overlooking the Interlaken region, along with the Mönch ('monk') and the Eiger ('ogre'), is most likely derived from the name Jungfrauenberg given to Wengernalp, the alpine meadow directly facing the huge northern side of the Jungfrau, across the Trummelbach gorge. Wengernalp was so named for the nuns of Interlaken Monastery, its historical owner. Contrary to popular belief, the name did not originate from the appearance of the snow-covered mountain, the latter looking like a veiled woman.

The "virgin" peak was heavily romanticized as "goddess" or "priestess" in late 18th to 19th century Romanticism. Its summit, considered inaccessible, remained untouched until the 19th century. After the first ascent in 1811 by Swiss alpinist Johann Rudolf Meyer, the peak was jokingly referred to as "Mme Meyer" (Mrs. Meyer).

== Geographic setting ==
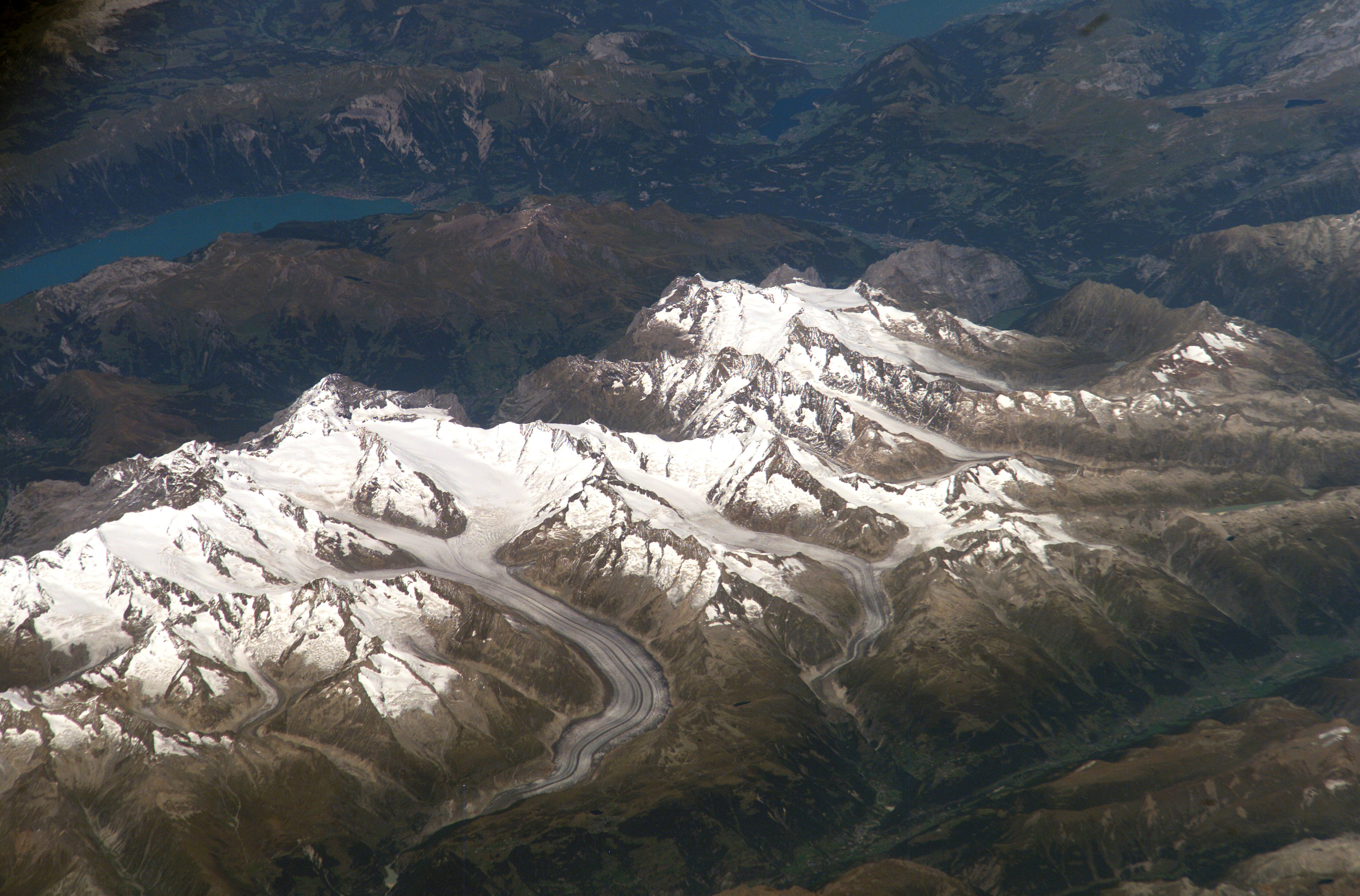
ISS image of the Bernese Alps showing the Wetterhorn (right), Eiger (centre), Jungfrau (left), Lake Brienz (background) and Aletsch glacier (foreground).

Politically, the Jungfrau (and its massif) is split between the municipalities of Lauterbrunnen (canton of Bern) and Fieschertal (canton of Valais). It is the third-highest mountain of the Bernese Alps after the nearby Finsteraarhorn 12.3 km (7.6 miles) to the east and Aletschhorn 8.1 km (5.0 miles) to the south, respectively. But from Lake Thun, and the greater part of the canton of Bern, it is the most conspicuous and the nearest of the Bernese Oberland peaks; with a height difference of 3,600 m (11,800 ft) between the summit and the town of Interlaken. This, and the extreme steepness of the north face, secured for it an early reputation for inaccessibility.

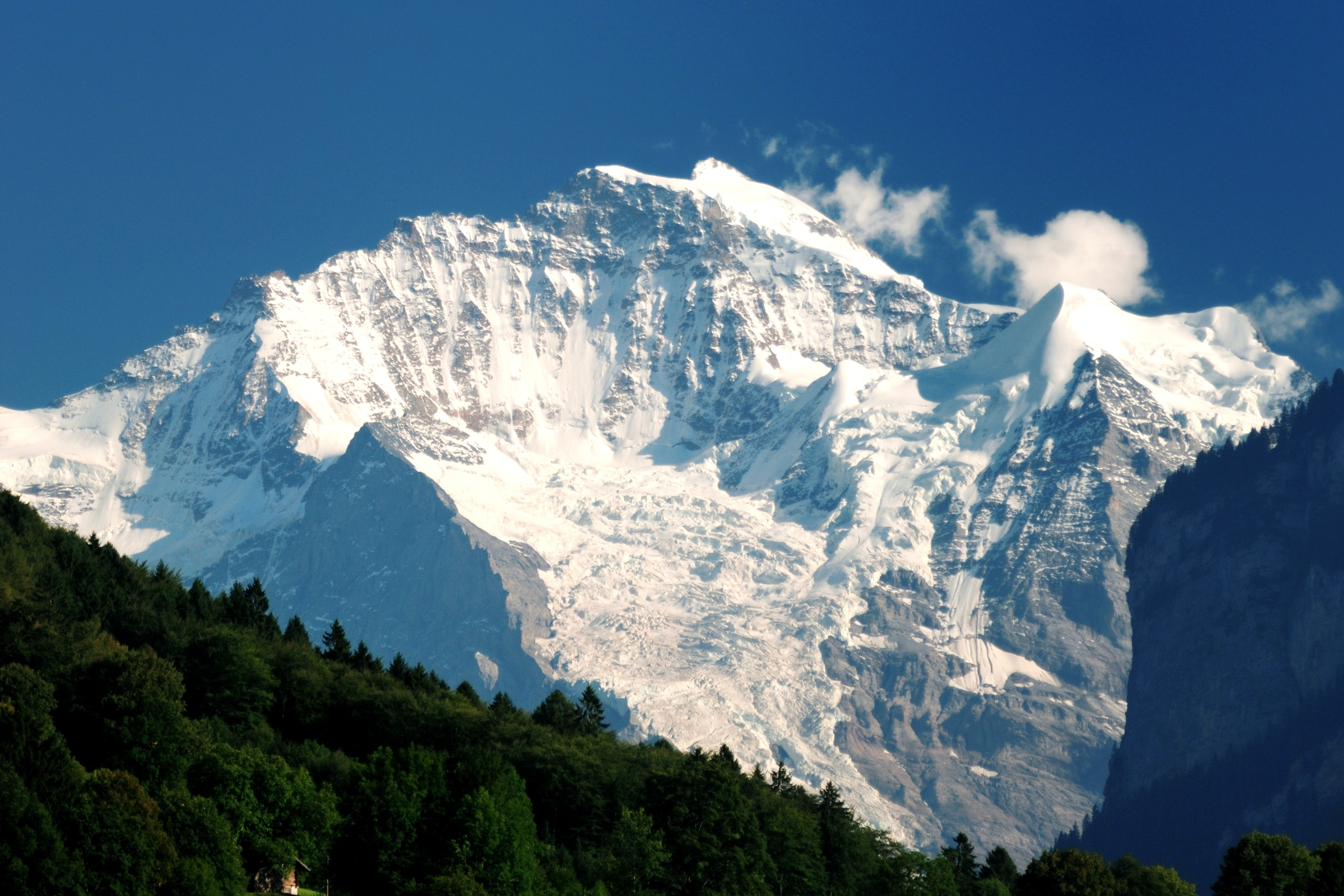
The Jungfrau and the valley of Lauterbrunnen from Interlaken

The Jungfrau is the highest point of a gigantic 10 km (6.2 miles) wall dominating the valleys of Lauterbrunnen and Grindelwald. The wall is formed by the alignment of some of the biggest north faces in the Alps, with the Mönch (4,107 m, 13,474 ft) and Eiger (3,967 m, 13,015 ft) to the northeast of the Jungfrau, and overlooks the valleys to its west and north by a height of up to 3 km (2 miles). The Jungfrau is approximately 5.3 km (3.3 miles) from the Eiger; with the summit of the Mönch between the two mountains, 3 km (2 miles) from the Jungfrau. The Jungfraujoch is the saddle between the Jungfrau and the Mönch and the Eigerjoch is the saddle between the Mönch and the Eiger.

The wall is extended to the general southwest by over a distance of about 14 km (8.7 miles) as far as to the Tschingelhoren (3,555 m, 11,663 ft) with the Lauterbrunnen Wall on its second half overlooking the beginning of the Lauterbrunnen Valley to the north.

From the Eiger onwards to the northeast follows another high Alpine ridge over about 14 km (8.7 miles)–however broken three times by very steep and up to 1,700 m (5,600 feet) deep gorges draining highest Alpine glaciers (Ischmeer/Ober Ischmeer, Grindelwald, Rosenlouwi Glaciers)–as far as the Wellhorn (3,181 m, 10,436 feet).

From the Mönch to the east starts a third impressive ridge with the Gross Fiescherhorn (4,049 m, 13,284 feet) after about 5 km (3.1 miles) with its impressive, northern Fiescher Wall below it. The highest Alpine ridge divides here into two, one leading south and the other roughly to the west as far as the Grimsel Pass in a distance of about 17 km (11 miles) as the crows fly.

The difference of altitude between the deep valley of Lauterbrunnen (800 m, 2,600 ft) and the summit is particularly visible from the area of Mürren. From the valley floor, west of the massif, the altitude gain is more than 3 km (2 miles) for a horizontal distance of 4.5 km (2.8 mi).

The landscapes around the Jungfrau are extremely contrasted. In contrast to the vertiginous precipices of its northwest, the mountain's southeastern side emerges from the upper snows of the Jungfraufirn, one of the main feeders of the Aletsch Glacier, at around 3,500 m (11,500 feet). The 20-kilometre-long (12 mi) valley of Aletsch on the southeast is completely uninhabited, and is surrounded by neighboring valleys with similar landscapes. The area as a whole constitutes the largest glaciated area not just in the Alps, but in Europe as well.

== Climbing history ==
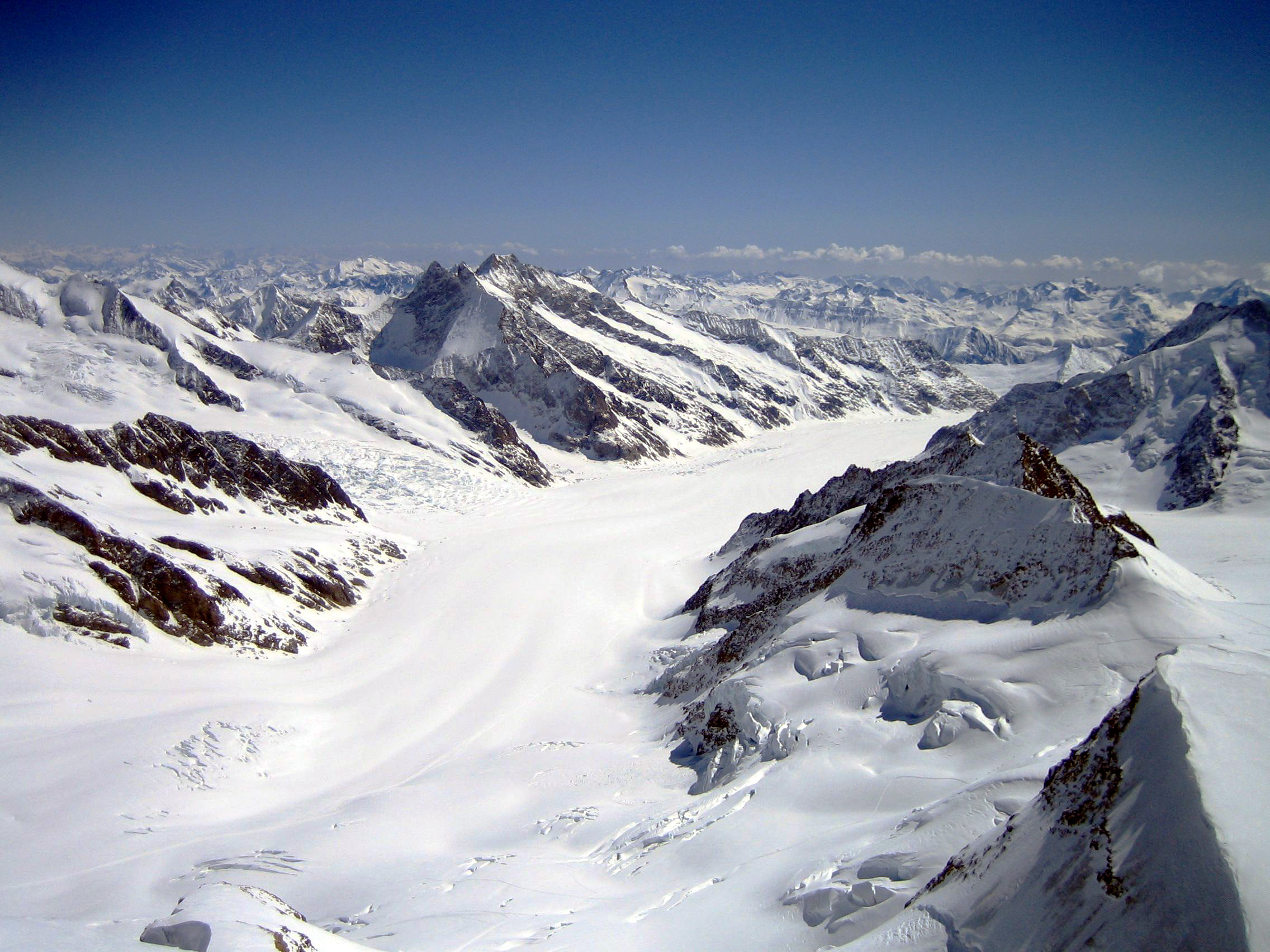
View over of the Aletsch Glacier and Concordia from the summit of the Jungfrau

In 1811, the brothers Johann Rudolf (1768–1825) and Hieronymus Meyer, sons of Johann Rudolf Meyer (1739–1813), the head of a rich merchant family of Aarau, along with several servants and a porter picked up at Guttannen, first reached the Valais by way of the Grimsel, and crossed the Beich Pass, a glacier pass over the Oberaletsch Glacier, to the head of the Lötschen valley. There, they added two local chamois hunters, Alois Volken and Joseph Bortis, to their party and traversed the Lötschenlücke before reaching the Aletschfirn (the west branch of the Aletsch Glacier), where they established the base camp, north of the Aletschhorn. After the Guttannen porter was sent back alone over the Lötschenlücke, the party finally reached the summit of the Jungfrau by the Rottalsattel on 3 August. They then recrossed the two passes named to their point of departure in Valais, and went home again over the Grimsel.

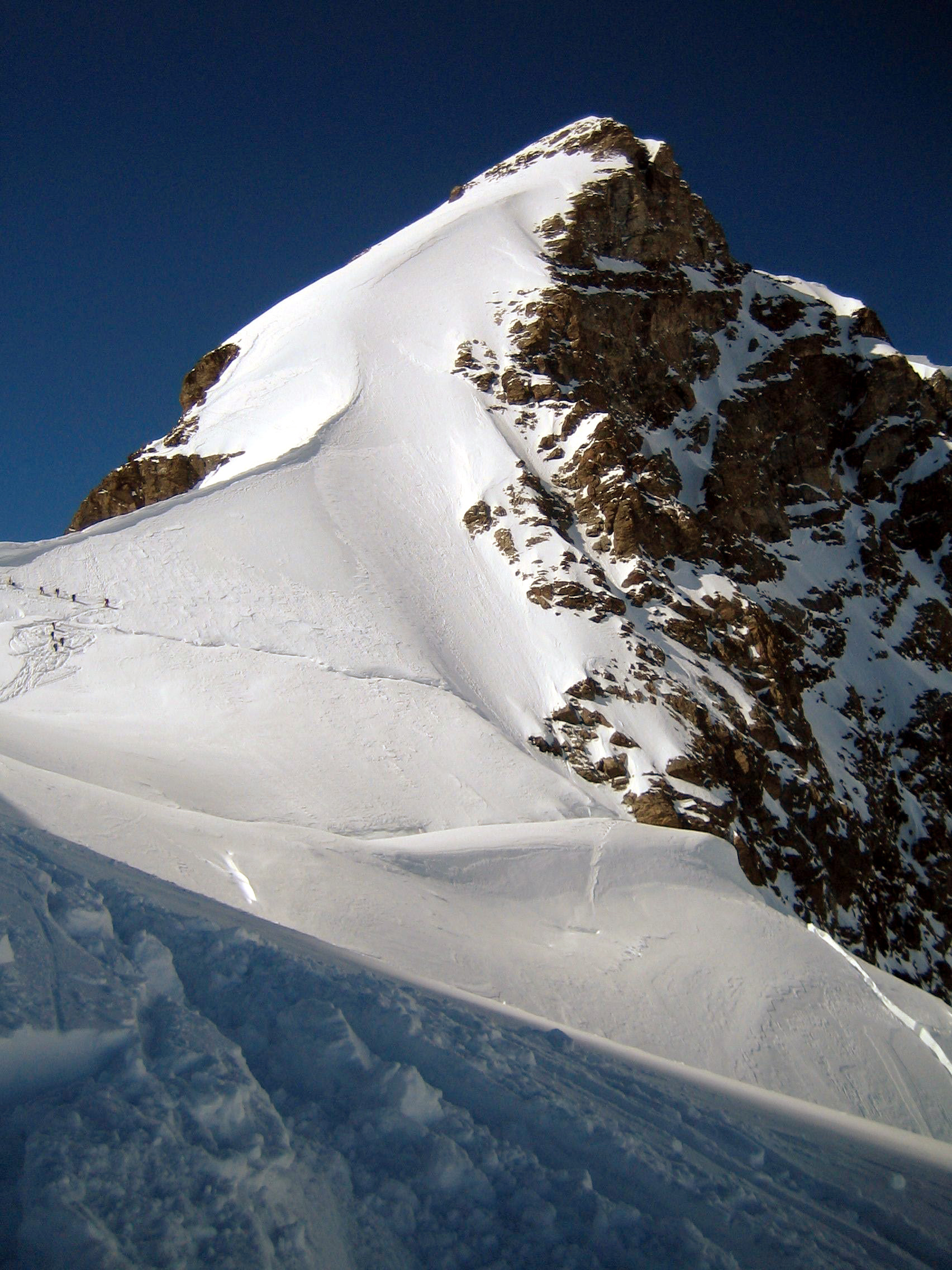
The Rottalhorn (3,971 m, 13,028 ft) from near the Rottalsattel (3,880 m, 12,730 ft). Note the climbers on the left

The journey was a most extraordinary one for the time, and some persons threw doubts at its complete success. To settle these, another expedition was undertaken in 1812. In this the two sons, Rudolf (1791–1833) and Gottlieb (1793–1829), of Johann Rudolf Meyer, played the chief parts. After an unsuccessful attempt, defeated by bad weather, in the course of which the Oberaarjoch was crossed twice (this route being much more direct than the long detour through the Lötschental), Rudolf, with the two Valais hunters (Alois Volker and Joseph Bortis), a Guttannen porter named Arnold Abbühl, and a Hasle man, bivouacked on a depression on the southeast ridge of the Finsteraarhorn. Next day (August 16) the whole party attempted the ascent of the Finsteraarhorn from the Studer névé on the east by way of the southeast ridge, but Meyer, exhausted, remained behind. The following day the party crossed the Grünhornlücke to the Aletsch Glacier, but bad weather then put an end to further projects. At a bivouac, probably just opposite the present Konkordia Hut, the rest of the party, having come over the Oberaarjoch and the Grünhornlücke, joined the Finsteraarhorn party. Gottlieb, Rudolf's younger brother, had more patience than the rest and remained longer at the huts near the Märjelensee, where the adventurers had taken refuge. He could make the second ascent (3 September) of the Jungfrau, the Rottalsattel being reached from the east side as is now usual, and his companions being the two Valais hunters.

The third ascent dates from 1828, when several men from Grindelwald, headed by Peter Baumann, planted their flag upon the summit. Next came the ascent by Louis Agassiz, James David Forbes, Heath, Desor, and Duchatelier in 1841, recounted by Desor in his Excursions et Séjours dans les Glaciers. Gottlieb Samuel Studer published an account of the next ascent made by himself and Bürki in 1842.

In 1863, a party consisting of three young Oxford University graduates and three Swiss guides successfully reached the summit and returned to the base camp of the Faulberg (located near the present position of the Konkordia Hut) in less than 11 hours (see the section below, The 1863 Ascent). In the same year Emma Winkworth, the daughter of Thomas Thomasson, became the first woman to climb the Jungfrau. She also slept overnight in the Faulberg cave prior to the ascent as there was no hut at that time.

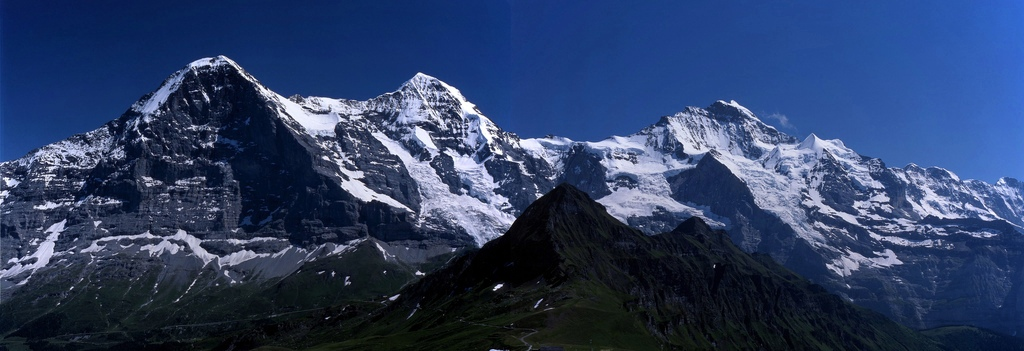
Eiger, Mönch and Jungfrau

Before the construction of the Jungfraujoch railway tunnel, the approach from the glaciers on the south side was very long. The first direct route from the valley of Lauterbrunnen was opened in 1865 by Sir George Young, H. Brooke George with the guide Christian Almer. They had to carry ladders with them in order to cross the many crevasses on the north flank. Having spent the night on the rocks of the Schneehorn (3,402 m, 11,161 ft) they gained next morning the Silberlücke, the depression between the Jungfrau and Silberhorn, and thence in little more than three hours reached the summit. Descending to the Aletsch Glacier they crossed the Mönchsjoch, and passed a second night on the rocks, reaching Grindelwald next day. This route became a usual until the opening of the Jungfraujoch.

The first winter ascent was made on 23 January 1874, by Meta Brevoort and W. A. B. Coolidge with guides Christian and Ulrich Almer. They used a sled to reach the upper Aletsch Glacier, and were accompanied by Miss Brevoort's favorite dog, Tschingel. The first ascent without a guide was made by Frederick Gardiner with Charles and Lawrence Pilkington on 30 July 1881.

The Jungfrau was climbed via the west side for the first time in 1885 by Fritz and Heinrich von Allmen, Ulrich Brunner, Fritz Graf, Karl Schlunegger and Johann Stäger—all from Wengen. They ascended the Rottal ridge (Innere Rottalgrat) and reached the summit on 21 September. The more difficult and dangerous northeast ridge that connects the summit from the Jungfraujoch was first climbed on 30 July 1911 by Albert Weber and Hans Schlunegger.

In July 2007, six Swiss Army recruits, part of the Mountain Specialists Division 1, died in an accident on the normal route. Although the causes of the deaths was not immediately clear, a report by the Swiss Federal Institute for Snow and Avalanche Research concluded that the avalanche risk was unusually high due to recent snowfall, and that there was "no other reasonable explanation" other than an avalanche for the incident.

=== The 1863 ascent ===
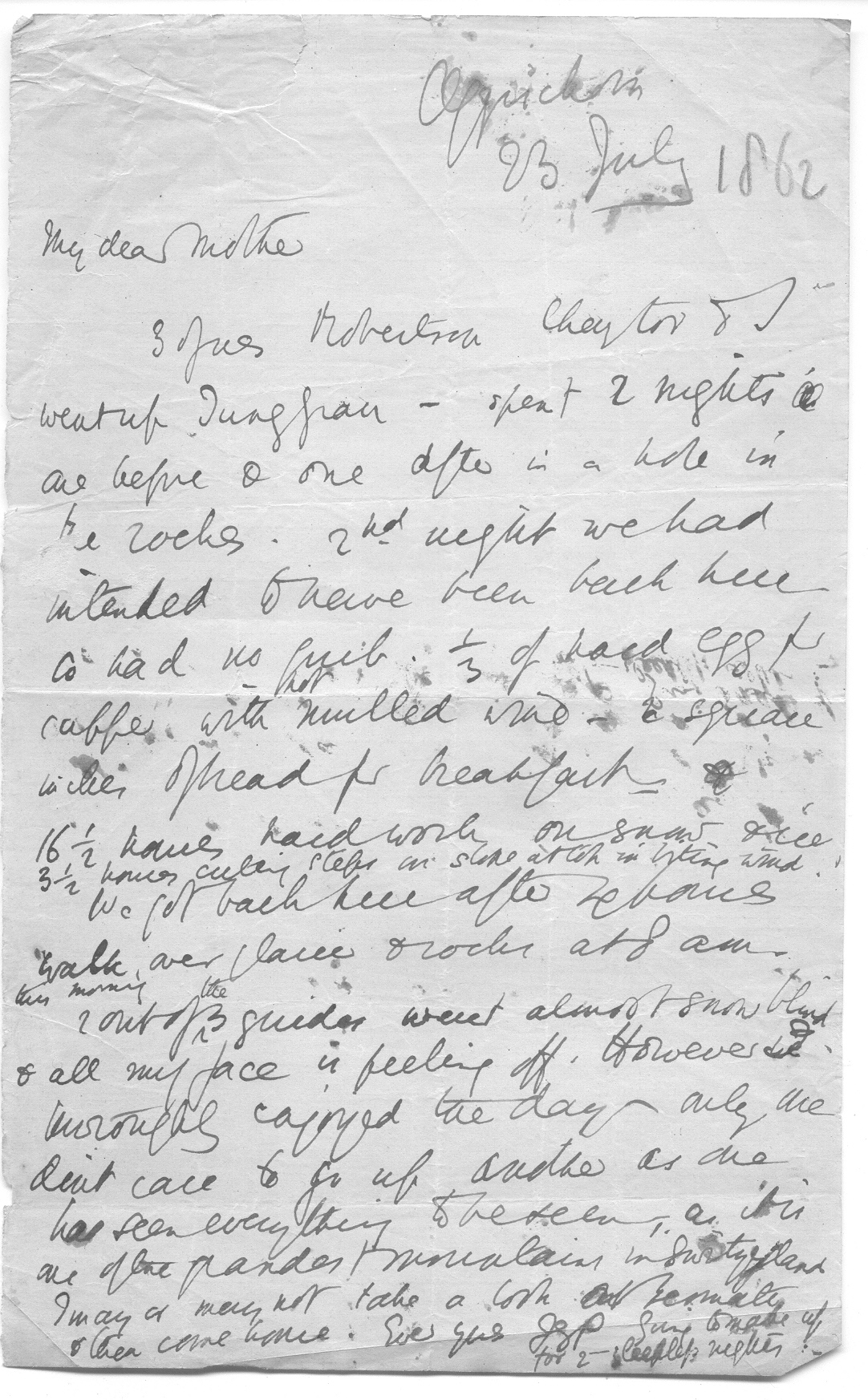
James Phillpotts’ letter to his mother announcing his successful ascent of the Jungfrau

The Führerbuch of the Alpine guide Peter Baumann records an ascent of the Jungfrau made by himself with three men from England in July 1863. The foreign climbers were long thought to have been John Tyndall, J. J. Hornby and T. H. Philpott, until in 1958 the records were checked by the Alpine Club and the following conclusion was reached:

On July 23, 1863, Phillpotts, with James Robertson and H.J. Chaytor, climbed the Jungfrau (the entry shown in A.J. 32. 227 was wrongly transcribed by Montagnier, who says ‘T.H. Philpott’ for J. S. Phillpotts). The entry in Peter Baumann’s Führerbuch (facsimile in A.C. archives) says that the trio crossed the Strahlegg Pass and the Oberaarjoch, and then climbed the Jungfrau from the Eggishorn.

Tyndall, Hornby and Philpott were well-known Alpinists, but there is no record of their having attempted the Jungfrau in 1863. Robertson, Chaytor and Phillpotts were novices; they had recently graduated from Oxford University where they had all been keen members of the Oxford University Boat Club.

William Robertson (1839–1892), the leader of the expedition (wrongly called 'James' in the Note quoted above), was an Australian by birth, and the first non-British national to take part in the Oxford and Cambridge Boat Race. He later became a barrister and member of parliament in Australia. He and H. J. Chaytor (possibly the father of the medievalist Henry John Chaytor) were both members of the victorious Oxford team in the 1861 Boat Race. James Surtees Phillpotts (1839–1930) was the third member of the team; he would later become headmaster of Bedford School. The trio had three Swiss guides, Peter Baumann, Peter Kaufmann ("Grabipeter", father of Peter Kaufmann the younger) and Rubi.

A description of the ascent of the Jungfrau is contained in a letter dated Sunday 26 July which Phillpotts wrote to his friend Alexander Potts (later to become the first headmaster of Fettes College). The letter is now in the possession of the Alpine Club. The following extracts are from that letter.

The Virgin certainly did not smile on the poor "fools who rushed in" on her sacred heights, i.e. in plain British, we had the treadmill slog, the biting wind, the half frost-bitten feet and the flayed faces that generally attend an Alpine ascent.

We got to the Faulberg hole about dark, and enjoyed the coffee the longman (Kauffmann) made, as one would in a hole in a rock in a cold evening. The "Faulberg Nachtlager" consists of two holes and a vestibule to the upper hole. The Upper Hole in which we lodged just contained Chay[tor], the Guv [Robertson] and myself, stretched at full length on a little hay over a hard rock mattress, convex instead of concave at the point where one likes to rest one's weight. Chaytor was in the middle, and as we were very close was warm and slept. The Guv and I courted Nature's soft nurse in vain. At two we got up and methodically put our feet into the stocks, i.e. our boots, breakfasted and shivered, then started (unwashed of course, as the cold gave us malignant hydrophobia) a little after 3:30.

The hole was about 150 feet [46 m] up one of the loose stone cliffs one now knows so well. So we groped our way down it and over the moraine – the stars still lingering, as day was just dawning. We could not start at 1:30, the proper time, as there was no moon and we wanted light as we had to tramp the glacier at once. Rubi led, and off we went, roped and in Indian file, in the old treadmill way over the slippery plowed-field-like snow that lay on the upper glacier, for a pull without a check of one or two hours.

At last we came to the region of bergschrunds and crevasses. They seemed to form at first an impassable labyrinth, but gradually the guides wound in and out between the large rifts, which were exquisitely lovely with their overhanging banks of snow and glittering icicles, and then trod as on pins and needles over a snowbridge here and there, or had to take a jump over the more feasible ones – and we found ourselves at the foot of the mountain; trudged up on the snow which ought to have been crisp but was even then more or less fresh fallen and sloppy; had to creep over about three crevasses, and after a tiresome pull, dragging one leg after another out of ankle or knee deep snow, we got on a crest of snow at right angles to the slope we had just come up. That slope with its crevasses on one side, and on the other a shorter and much steeper one which led in a few steps to a precipice.

All along this crest went a snakelike long crevasse, for which we had continually to sound, and go first one side and then the other; then we got to the foot of the saddle. Some twenty or thirty steps, some cut, some uncut, soon took us up a kind of hollow, and we got on a little sloping plateau of some six feet [1.8 m] large, where we left the grub and the knapsack, keeping my small flask of cognac only. Then up a steep ice slope, very steep I should say, down which the bits of ice cut out of the steps hopped and jumped at full gallop and then bounded over to some bottomless place which we could not see down. Their pace gave one an unpleasant idea of the possible consequence of a slip.

Here we encountered a biting bitter wind. Peter Baumann cut magnificent steps, at least he and Rubi did between them, the one improving on the other's first rough blows. After Rubi came Chaytor with Kauffmann behind him, then the Guv, and then myself, the tail of the string. Each step was a long lift from the last one, and as the snow was shallow they had to be cut in the ice which was like rock on this last slope.

Suddenly there burst upon us, on lifting our heads over the ridge, the green and cheerful valleys of Lauterbrunnen and Interlaken, of Grindelwald and a distant view of others equally beautiful stretching on for ever in one vast panorama. On the other side in grim contrast there was a wild and even awful scene. One gazed about one and tried in vain to see to the bottom of dark yawning abysses and sheer cliffs of ice or rock.

== Tourism ==
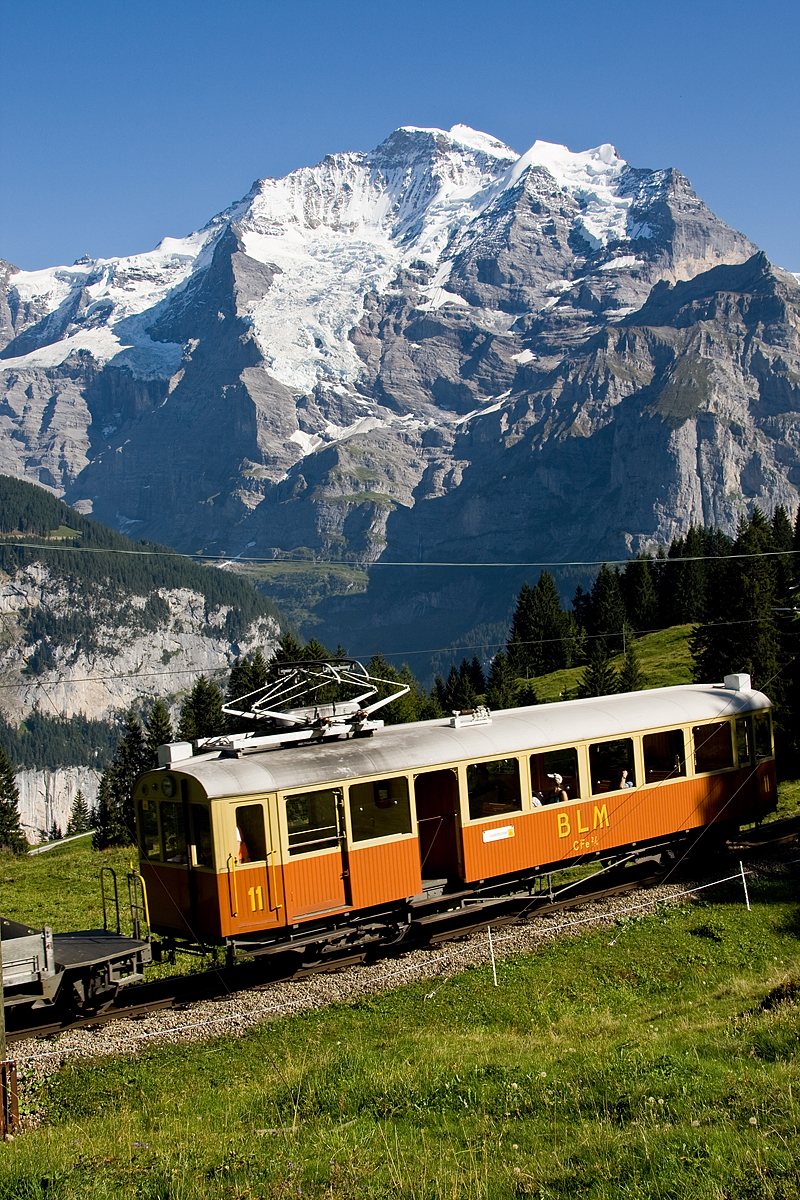
The Jungfrau seen from one of the many mountain railways in the valley (here the Mürren Railway)

Named after the Jungfrau, the Jungfrau Region of the Bernese Oberland is a major tourist destination in the Alps and includes a large number of railways and other facilities. While the mountain peak was once difficult to access, the Jungfrau Railway, a rack railway, now goes to the Jungfraujoch railway station at 3,454 m (11,332 ft), therefore providing an easy access to the upper Aletsch Glacier and a relatively short access to the Jungfrau itself, the height difference between the station and the summit being only 704 m (2,310 ft) and the horizontal distance being slightly less than 2 km (1.2 miles). As a result, in the popular mind, the Jungfrau has become a mountain associated with the Bernese Oberland and Interlaken, rather than with Upper Valais and Fiesch.

In 1893, Adolf Guyer-Zeller conceived of the idea of a railway tunnel to the Jungfraujoch to make the glaciated areas on its south side more accessible. The building of the tunnel took 16 years and the summit station was not opened before 1912. The goal was in fact to reach the summit of the Jungfrau with an elevator from the highest railway station, located inside the mountain. The complete project was not realized because of the outbreak of the World War I. Nevertheless, it was at the time one of the highest railways in the world and remains today the highest in Europe and the only (non-cable) railway on Earth going well past the perennial snow-line.

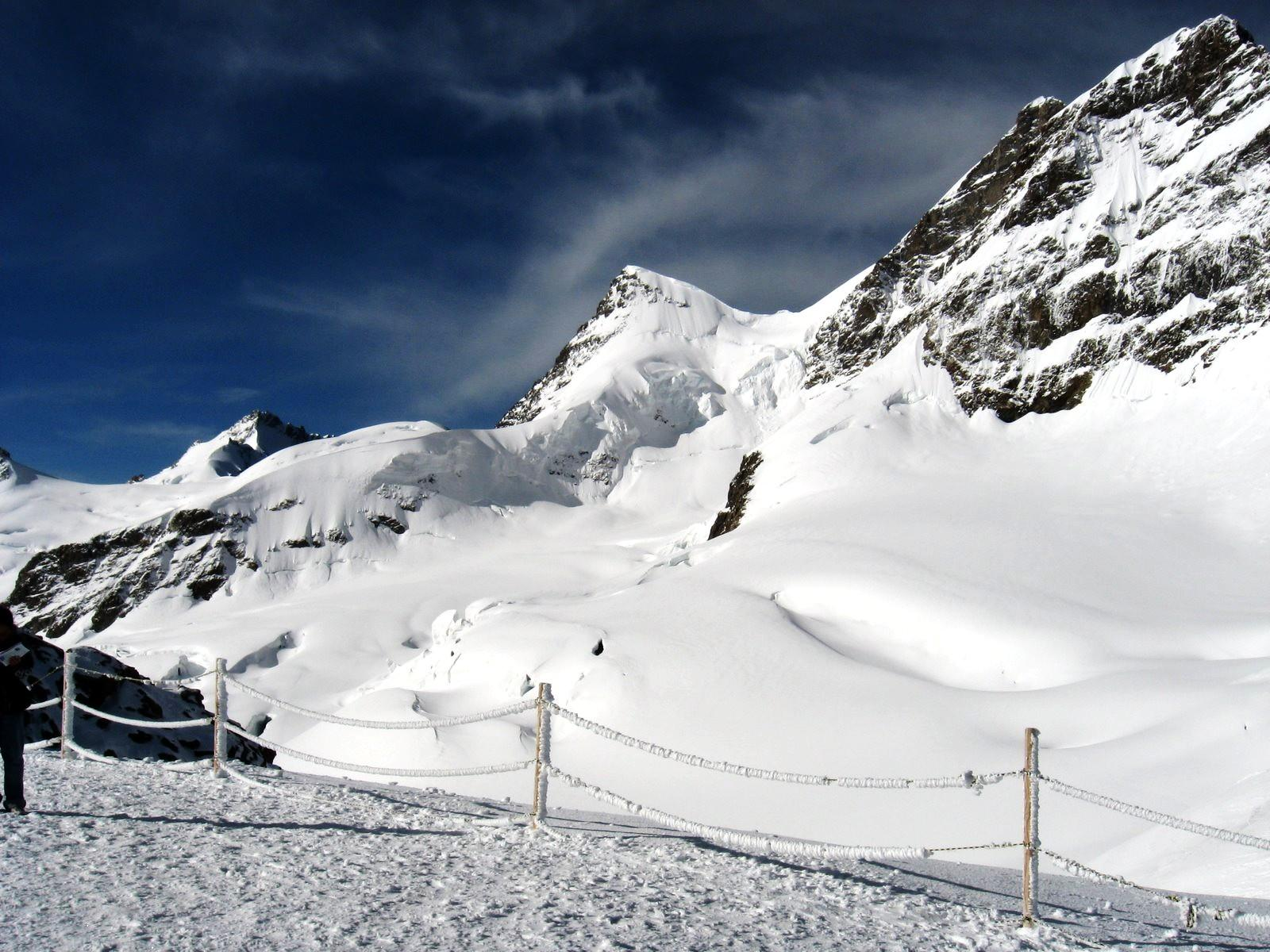
Rottalhorn and Jungfrau east side from the Jungfraujoch

The Jungfrau Railway leaves from Kleine Scheidegg, which can be reached from both sides by trains from Grindelwald, and Lauterbrunnen via Wengen. The train enters the Jungfrau Tunnel running eastward through the Eiger just above Eigergletscher, which is, since 2020, also accessible by aerial tramway from Grindelwald. Before arriving at the Jungfraujoch, it stops for a few minutes at two other stations, Eigerwand (on the north face of the Eiger) and Eismeer (on the south side), where passengers can see through the holes excavated from the mountain. The journey from Kleine Scheidegg to Jungfraujoch takes approximately 50 minutes including the stops; the downhill return journey taking only 35 minutes.

A large complex of tunnels and buildings has been constructed at the Jungfraujoch, referred to as the "Top of Europe". There are several restaurants and bars, shops, multimedia exhibitions, a post office, and a research station with dedicated accommodation facilities. An elevator enables access to the top of the Sphinx and its observatory, at 3,571 m (11,716 ft), the highest viewing platform of the area. Outside, at the level of the Jungfraujoch, there is a ski school, and the "Ice Palace", a collection of elaborate ice sculptures displayed inside the Aletsch Glacier. Another tunnel leads to the east side of the Sphinx, where one can walk on the glacier up to the Mönchsjoch Hut, the only hotel infrastructure in the area.

Apart from the Jungfraujoch, many facilities have been built in the Jungfrau Region, including numerous mountain railways. In 1908, the first public cable car in the world, the Wetterhorn Elevator, opened at the foot of the Wetterhorn, but was closed seven years later. The Schilthorn above Mürren, the Männlichen above Wengen, and the Schynige Platte above Wilderswil, offer good views of the Jungfrau and the Lauterbrunnen valley. On the south side, the Eggishorn above Fiesch also offers views of the Jungfrau, across the Aletsch Glacier.

== Climbing routes ==
The normal route follows the traces of the first climbers, but the long approach on the Aletsch Glacier is no longer necessary. From the area of the Jungfraujoch the route to the summit takes only a few hours. Most climbers start from the Mönchsjoch Hut. After a traverse of the Jungfraufirn the route heads to the Rottalsattel (3,885 m, 12,746 ft), from where the southern ridge leads to the Jungfrau. It is not considered a very difficult climb but it can be dangerous on the upper section above the Rottalsattel, where most accidents happen. The use of the Jungfrau Railway instead of the much more gradual approach from Fiesch (or Fieschertal), via the Konkordia Hut, can cause some acclimatization troubles as the difference of altitude between the railway stations of Interlaken and Jungfraujoch is almost 3 km (2 miles).

== See also ==
- List of 4000 metre peaks of the Alps

== Bibliography ==
- Ball, John (1869). The Alpine Guide: Central Alps. London: Longmans, Green and Co.
