= Mönchsjoch Hut =

Mountain hut in Switzerland

Coordinates: 46°33′17.1″N 8°00′20.4″E

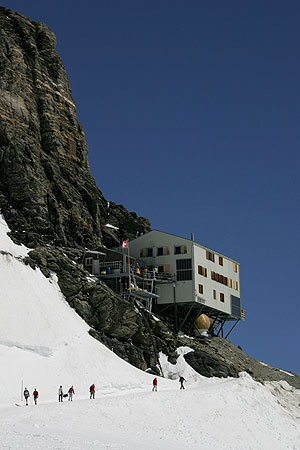
Mönchsjoch Hut

The Mönchsjoch Hut (German: Mönchsjochhütte) is a mountain hut located in the Bernese Alps in the canton of Valais in Switzerland. At an altitude of 3,658 metres (12,001 ft) it is the highest staffed hut in Switzerland.

The hut lies just above the Obers Mönchsjoch (3,627 m), between Mönch and Trugberg, on the upper Aletsch Glacier. It is used for the ascents of Jungfrau, Mönch and other peaks of the region.

== Access ==
The hut is easily accessible by pedestrians from the Jungfraujoch railway station during the summer season by a secured piste on the glacier. However, during winter season it remains accessible only to mountaineers. It can also be accessed from the Konkordia Hut on the south.

== See also ==
- List of buildings and structures above 3000 m in Switzerland
