= Jungfraujoch railway station =

Railway station in Switzerland

Jungfraujoch
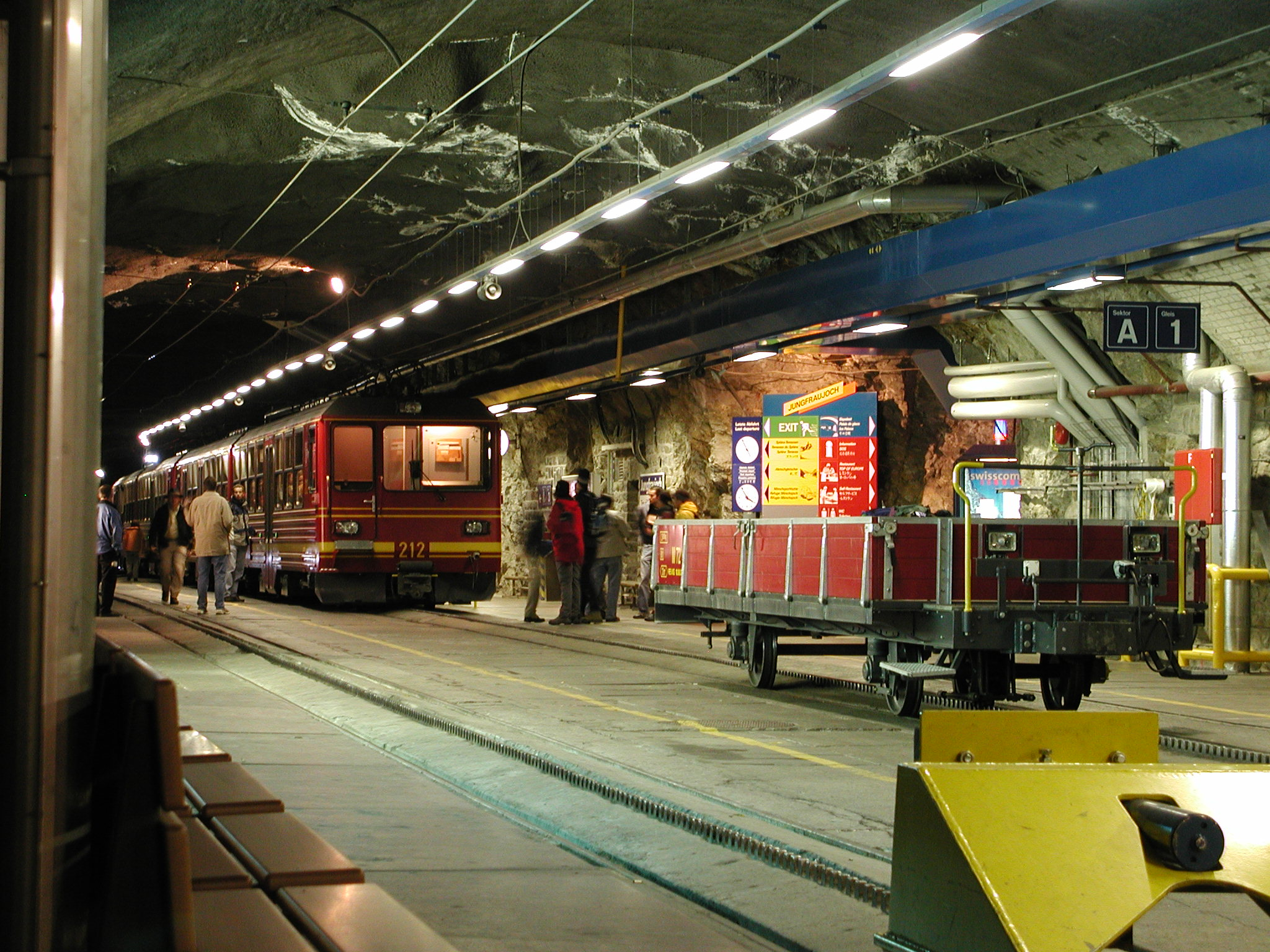

General information
- Location: Near the Jungfraujoch; Fieschertal, Valais; Switzerland
- Coordinates: 46°32′51″N 07°58′56″E
- Elevation: 3,454 m (11,332 ft)
- Line: Jungfrau Railway

History
- Opened: 1 August 1912; 114 years ago

Services
Preceding station	Jungfraubahn AG	Following station
Eismeer towards Kleine Scheidegg	Jungfrau Railway	Terminus
Location
- Location within Switzerland Location within Canton of Valais

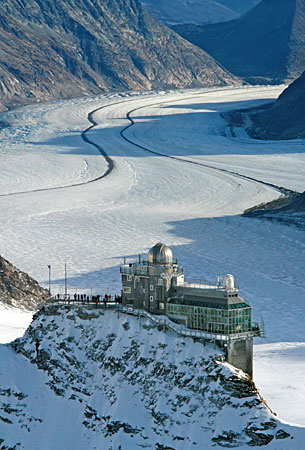
The Sphinx observatory above the Aletsch Glacier

Jungfraujoch is an underground railway station situated near the Jungfraujoch, in the canton of Valais, a few metres from the border with the canton of Bern. At 3,454 metres (11,332 ft) above sea level, it is the terminus of the Jungfrau Railway and the highest railway station in Switzerland and Europe. The Jungfrau Railway runs from Kleine Scheidegg in the Bernese Oberland, through the Jungfrau Tunnel (inside the Eiger and Mönch) and crosses the border between the two cantons shortly before the terminus.

== Location and geography ==
The station is located east of the Jungfraujoch, less than 300 metres away, below the Sphinx ridge. The Jungfraujoch itself is a snow saddle constituting the lowest point of the ridge between the Jungfrau and the Mönch. A complex of tunnels connects the railway station to the Top of Europe building, overlooking the Aletsch Glacier on the south side, and an elevator to the summit of the Sphinx, the peak overlooking the saddle from the east. At the Sphinx are enclosed and open viewing platforms, with views over both sides of the Jungfraujoch and the surrounding peaks. A scientific observatory, the Sphinx Observatory, is also located here.

Also accessed via the tunnels is the Ice Palace, a series of ice caverns beneath the glacier, and the Alpine Sensation, which presents a display on the tourism development of the Alps and the history of the Jungfrau Railway.

== Administration and operations ==
Administratively, the station is situated in the municipality of Fieschertal in the canton of Valais, albeit very close to the border with the municipality of Lauterbrunnen in the canton of Bern. The cantonal border follows the watershed between the Rhône and Aare river basins (and thus between the Mediterranean Sea and North Sea catchments, respectively) across the Jungfraujoch above the station.

The station is served by trains of the Jungfrau railway, which run from Kleine Scheidegg, where they connect with services from Interlaken, Lauterbrunnen, Wengen and Grindelwald via the Bernese Oberland railway and the Wengernalp railway. The following passenger trains operate:

Operator	Route	Typical Frequency
Jungfrau Railway	Kleine Scheidegg - Eigergletscher - Eigerwand - Eismeer - Jungfraujoch	2 per hour

== See also ==
- List of buildings and structures in Switzerland above 3000 m
- List of highest railway stations in Switzerland
- List of highest railway stations in the world
- Rail transport in Switzerland
