= Top of Europe =

High-altitude building in Bern, Switzerland

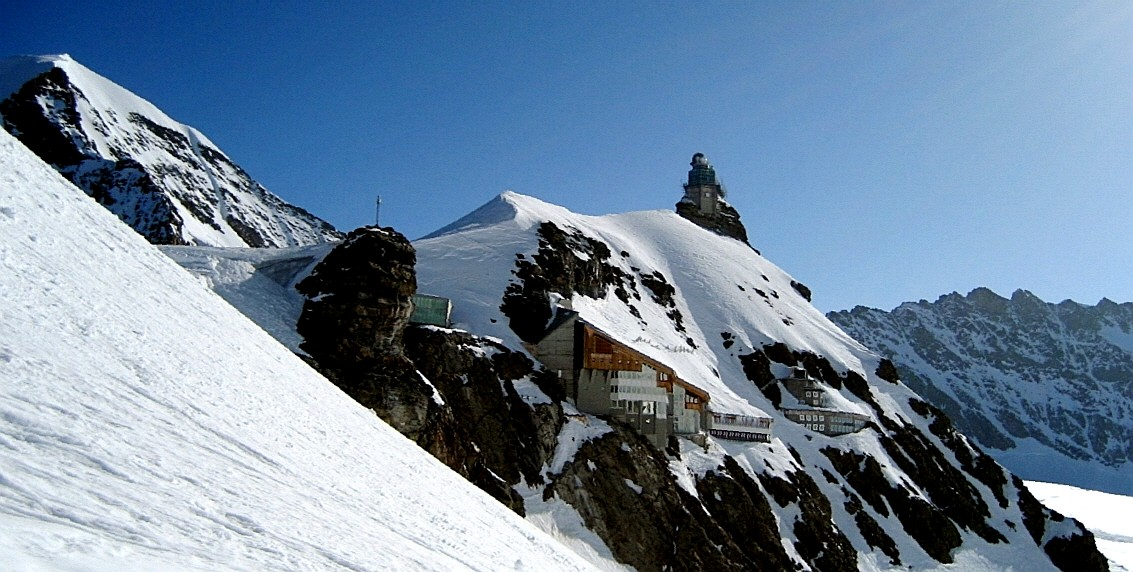
The Top of Europe building (centre) and the Sphinx Observatory

The Top of Europe™ is a brand name for a high-altitude building located in the Swiss canton of Bern. It overlooks the Aletsch Glacier from the south side of the Jungfraujoch, at a height of 3,454 metres (11,332 feet) above sea level. It is connected to the underground Jungfraujoch railway station by a tunnel and to the Sphinx Observatory by an elevator. It has five levels.

The Top of Europe includes several restaurants and a permanent exhibition about the Jungfrau Railway and the Alps. It also includes Europe's highest-altitude post office. An older building includes a research station.

== See also ==
- List of buildings and structures in Switzerland above 3000 m
- List of highest points of European countries
