= Trugberg =

Mountain in Switzerland

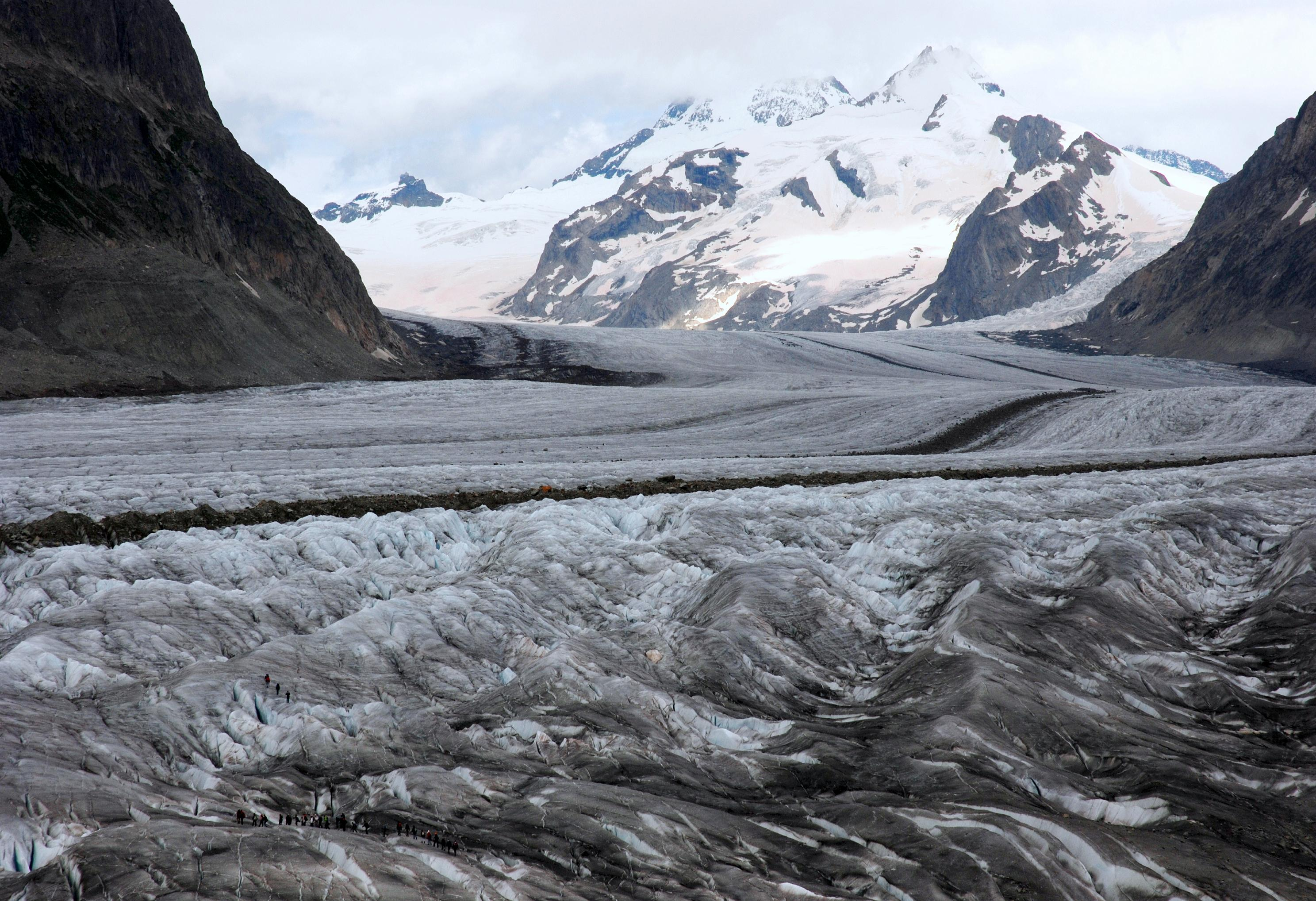
- Trugberg (right) from the Aletsch Glacier

Highest point
- Elevation: 3,932 m (12,900 ft)
- Prominence: 308 m (1,010 ft)
- Parent peak: Mönch
- Listing: Alpine mountains above 3000 m
- Coordinates: 46°32′50″N 8°00′56″E

Geography
- Location within Switzerland
- Location: Valais, Switzerland
- Parent range: Bernese Alps

Climbing
- First ascent: 1871

The Trugberg is a mountain in the Bernese Alps, located south of the Mönch in the canton of Valais, Switzerland. It is located above the Konkordiaplatz where the névé of the Jungfraufirn on the west side and the Ewigschneefeld on the east side converge to form the Aletsch Glacier. Debris accumulating on both sides of the mountain form one of the two important supraglacial moraines of the Aletsch Glacier.

During their ascent of the Jungfrau in 1841, a group of explorers including Pierre Jean Édouard Desor and Louis Agassiz for a while thought that the Trugberg, hiding the Jungfrau from sight, was their destination. Eventually, they realized their error and decided to name the mountain Trugberg, meaning Deceitful Mountain.

The Trugberg was first climbed 13 July 1871 by Dr. Emil Burckardt from Basel, with the two local guides Peter Egger and Peter Schlegel. The route they took was by the east flank.

== See also ==
- List of mountains of the Alps above 3000 m
- List of mountains of Switzerland
