= Sphinx Observatory =

Astronomical observatory in Switzerland

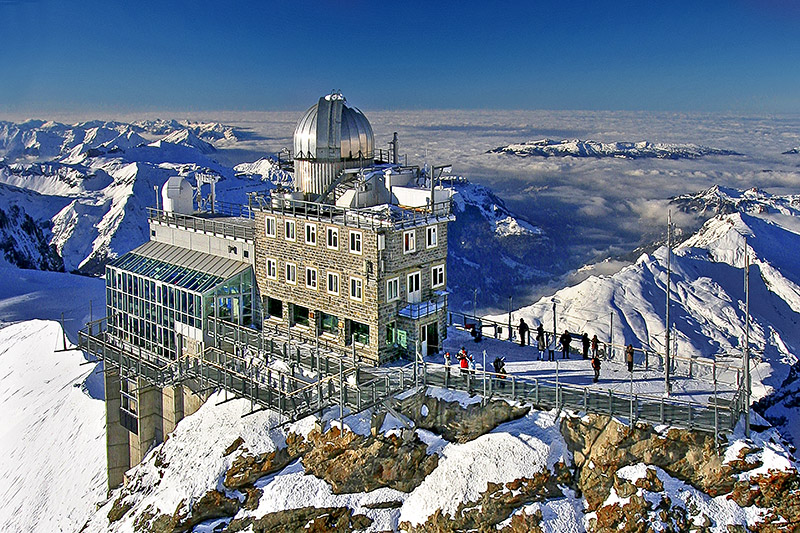
- Location: Valais, Switzerland
- Coordinates: 46°32′51″N 7°59′6″E
- Altitude: 3,571 m (11,716 ft)
- Established: 1937
- Website: www.hfsjg.ch

Telescopes
- Astronomical dome: 76 cm (29.92 in)
- Related media on Commons

The Sphinx Observatory is an astronomical observatory located above the Jungfraujoch in Switzerland. It is named after the Sphinx, a rocky summit on which it is located. At 3,571 m (11,716 ft) above mean sea level, it is one of the highest observatories in the world. Accessible to the public, it is also the second highest observation deck in Switzerland. The mountain top has been tunneled to fit an elevator which ascends to the observatory from the Jungfraujoch railway station, the highest such train station in Europe. The building is located on the Valais side of the border, only a few metres from the canton of Bern, although it is accessed via the Jungfrau Railway from the Bernese Oberland.

The open viewing deck accessible to the public is adjacent to the observatory. It offers views of the Jungfrau, Mönch, and Eiger peaks, all within a few kilometers.

== Science ==
The scientific part of the Sphinx observatory includes two large laboratories, a weather observation station, a workshop, two terraces for scientific experiments, and an astronomical as well as a meteorological cupola. The astronomical cupola is equipped with a 76 cm telescope with Cassegrain and Coudé focus.

The observatory plays an important role in a range of long-term experiments; it serves as a solar spectrometer for the Institute of Astrophysics and Geophysics at the University of Liège, Belgium, and plays a key role in a LIDAR experiment conducted by the École Polytechnique Fédérale de Lausanne in Switzerland. In 1949, nuclear emulsion plates exposed to cosmic rays in the observatory provided first precise evidence for the existence of the charged K-meson.

== In popular media ==
The observatory can be seen in the movies The Grand Budapest Hotel, The Hero: Love Story of a Spy and Krrish 3. It was visited in season 22 of the American reality competition series The Amazing Race during their visit to Switzerland in Leg 8.

It also appears in the 2016 video game Steep and as the setting for a conference called The Meadows in the final episode of The Pentaverate.

A 2019–2020 Korean drama Crash Landing on You has the lead couple visit the Observatory in episode 16.

The observatory served as heavy inspiration for one that appears in 2025 video game Abiotic Factor. It is depicted under the name "Voussoir Facility" and is owned and operated by Garrick Advanced Technology Enterprises. The observatory is vital to the progression of the story as it contains the first instances of an item that must be collected by the player to advance to the next level of the game.

== Gallery ==
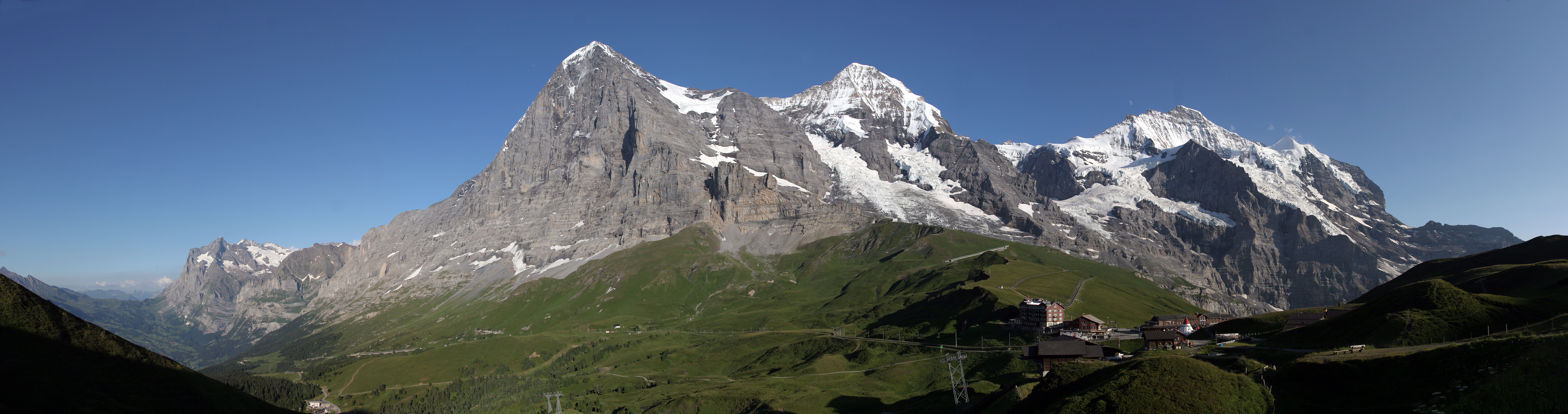
The Eiger (left), Mönch (middle) and Jungfrau (right) massif. The observatory is located on the saddle between the Mönch and Jungfrau (see image with description labels).

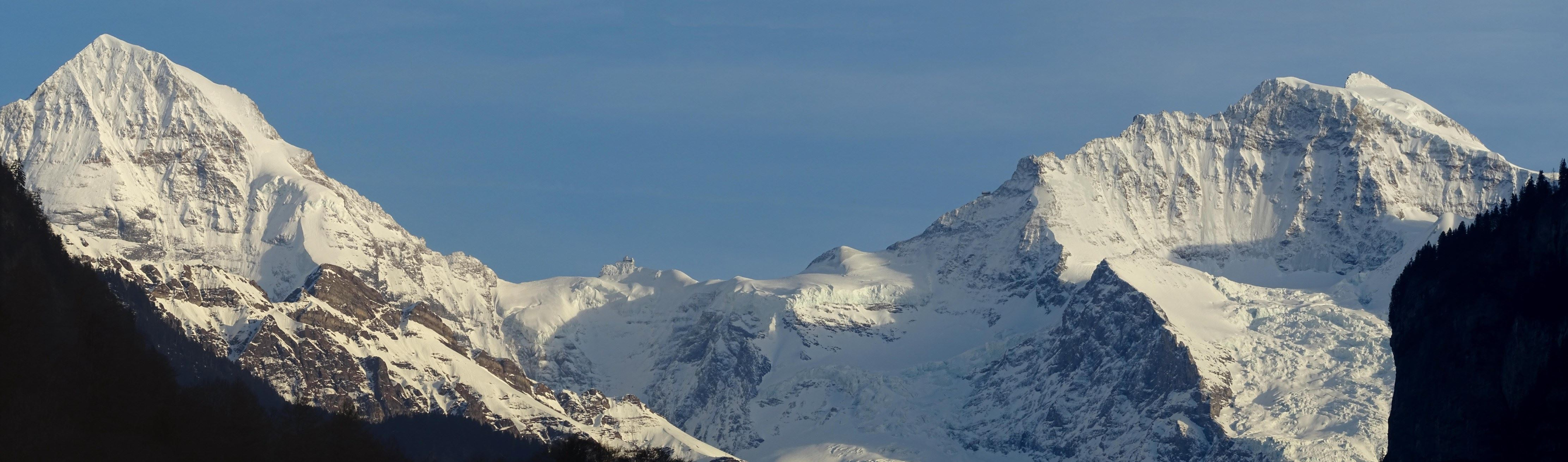
The Mönch (left) and the Jungfrau (right). The Sphinx observatory can be seen in the middle, on the saddle between the two summits.

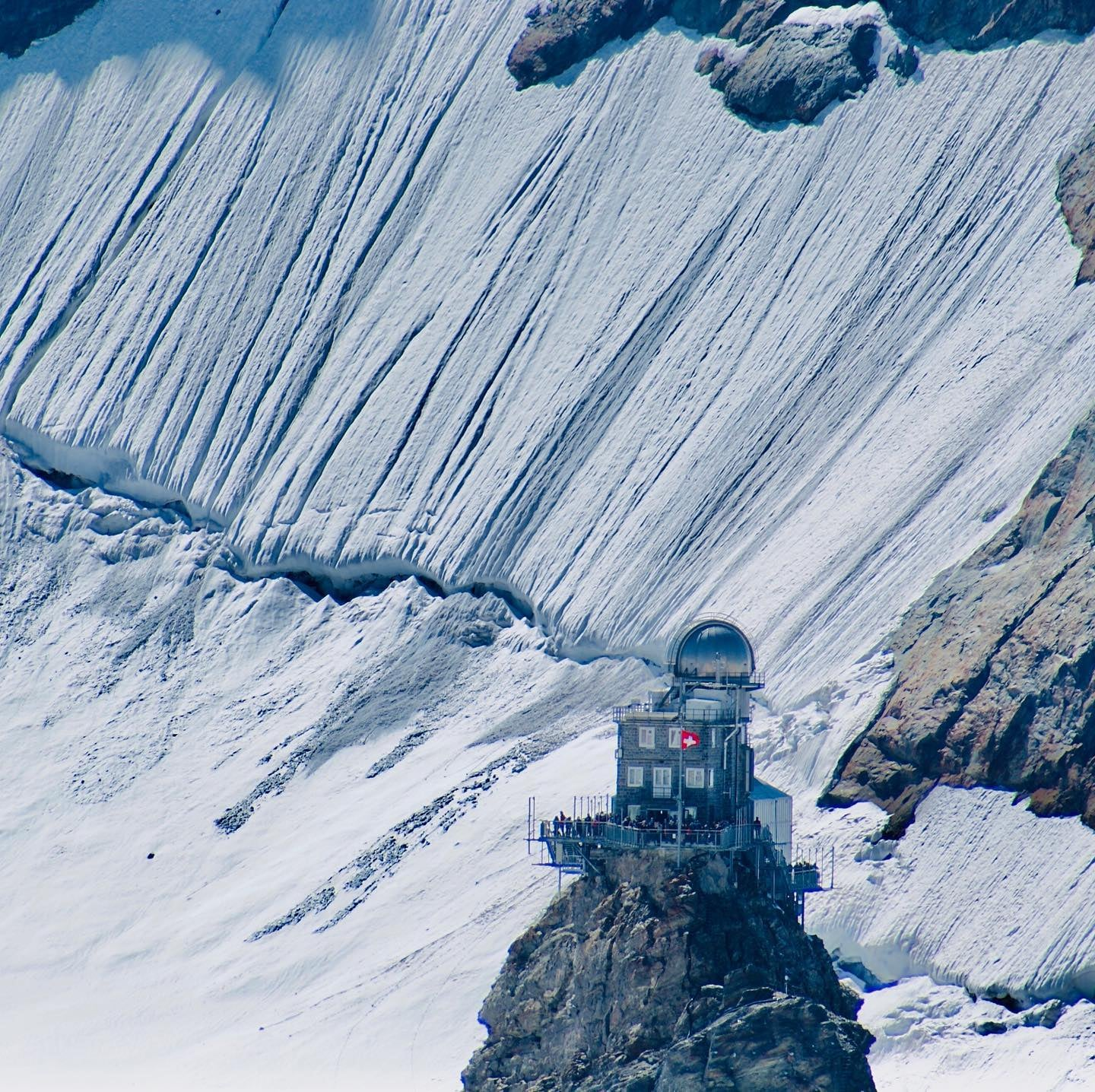

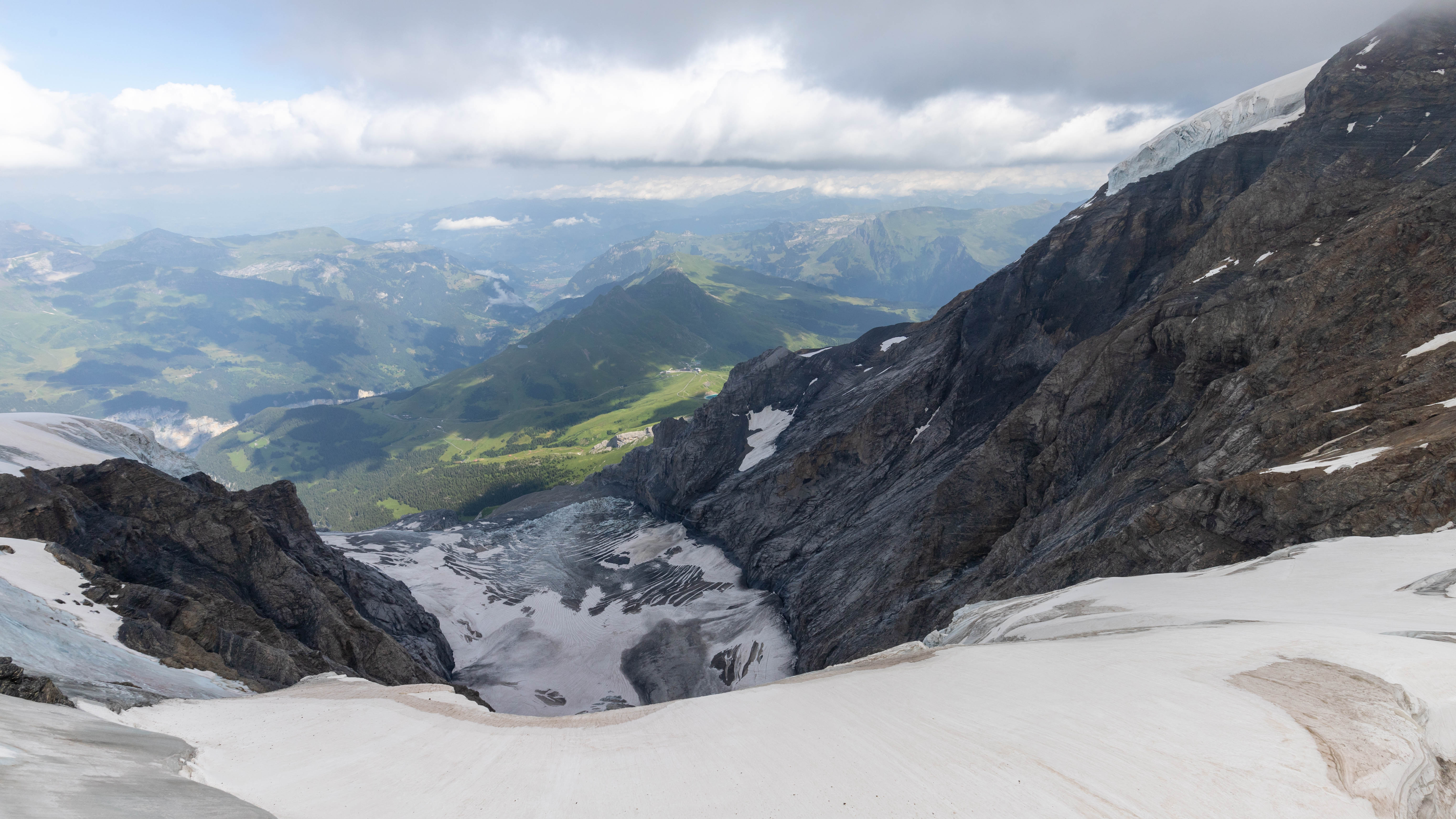
The Guggigletscher seen from the platform of the observatory

== See also ==
- List of buildings and structures above 3000 m in Switzerland
- List of mountains of Switzerland accessible by public transport
