= Henry Morgan (academic) =

Professor of Jesus College, Cambridge (1830–1912)

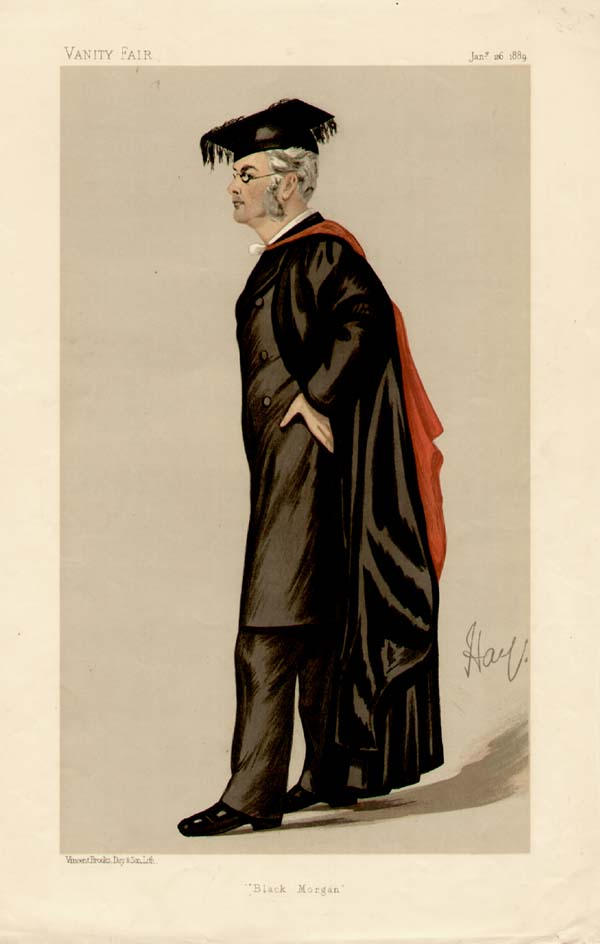
"Black Morgan", caricature by Hay in Vanity Fair, 1889.

The Reverend Henry Arthur Morgan, D.D. (1 July 1830 – 2 September 1912) was an English academic, master of Jesus College, Cambridge from 1885 until his death. He was born in Gothenburg and educated at Shrewsbury and Jesus College, Cambridge. and he was ordained in 1859. Morgan was a Fellow at Jesus from 1858 to 1885.

The Reverend Henry Morgan was affectionately nicknamed ‘Black Morgan’ to distinguish him from the unrelated Senior Tutor and Dean of Jesus College called The Reverend Edmund Henry Morgan (‘Red Morgan’).

In 1862, Henry Morgan and Leslie Stephen were the first mountaineers to ascend Jungfraujoch in the Bernese Alps. Morgan wrote extensively about academia, theology and geography. He was pivotal in raising the profile of smaller colleges within the University of Cambridge.
