= Jungfraujoch =

Glacier saddle in the Swiss Alps

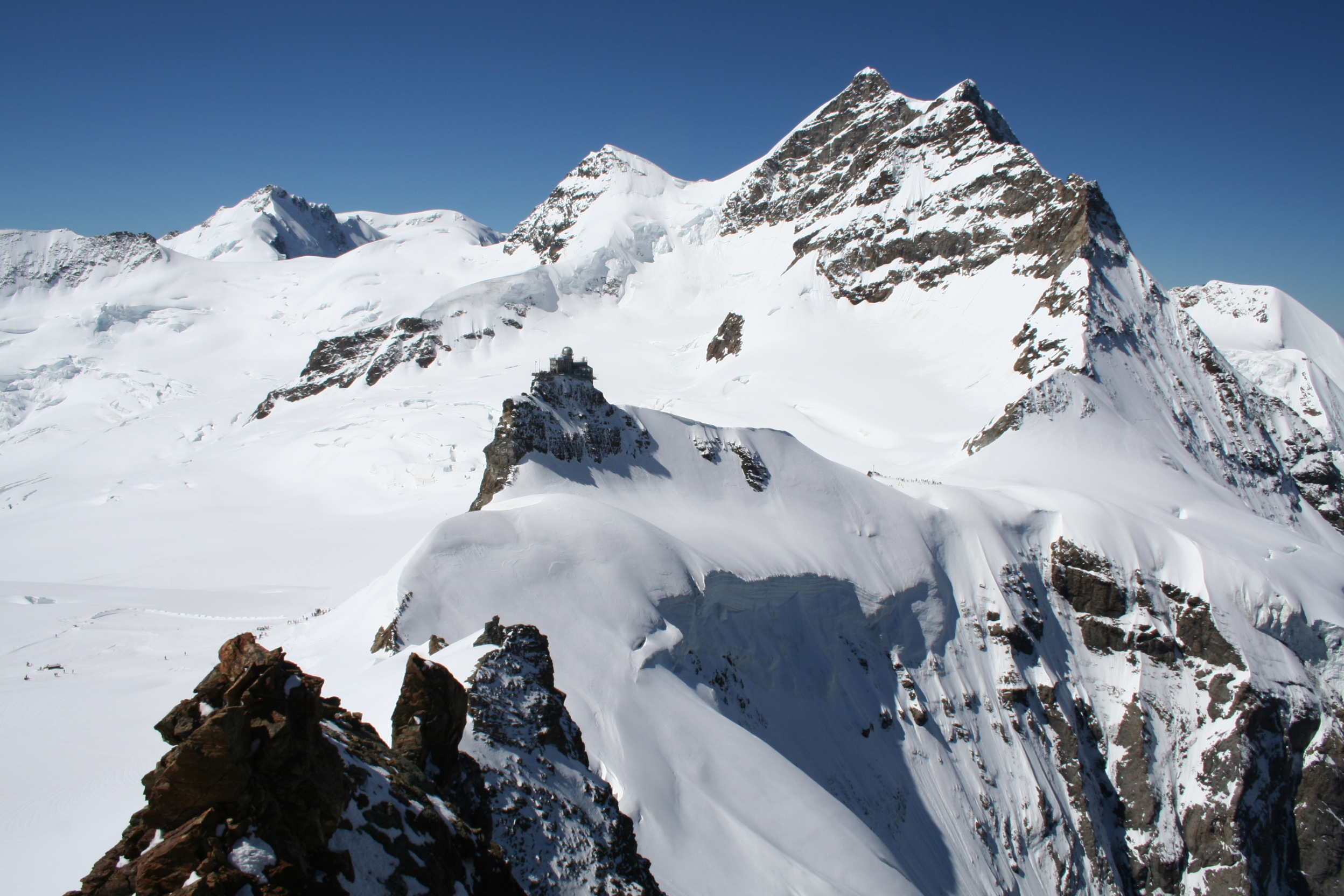
- The Jungfrau from the Mönch, with the Sphinx and the Jungfraujoch in the middle

Highest point
- Elevation: 3,463 m (11,362 ft)
- Coordinates: 46°32′50″N 7°58′50″E

Naming
- English translation: Jungfrau (virgin, maiden) saddle (or yoke)
- Language of name: German

Geography
- Location within Switzerland
- Country: Switzerland
- Cantons: Bern; Valais
- Parent range: Bernese Alps
- Topo map: Swiss Federal Office for Topography - swisstopo

Climbing
- First ascent: unknown First traversed by Leslie Stephen and party (1862)
- Normal route: Jungfrau Railway

The Jungfraujoch (Swiss Standard German pronunciation: [ˈjʊŋfraʊˌjɔx], lit. "maiden saddle") is a saddle connecting two major 4000ers of the Bernese Alps: the Jungfrau and the Mönch. It lies at an elevation of 3,463 metres (11,362 ft) above sea level and is directly overlooked by the rocky prominence of the Sphinx. The Jungfraujoch is a glacier saddle, on the upper snows of the Aletsch Glacier, and part of the Jungfrau-Aletsch area, situated on the boundary between the cantons of Bern and Valais, halfway between Interlaken and Fiesch.

Since 1912, the Jungfraujoch has been accessible to tourists by the Jungfrau line, a railway from Interlaken and Kleine Scheidegg, running partly underground through a tunnel through the Eiger and Mönch. The Jungfraujoch railway station, at an elevation of 3,454 metres (11,332 ft) is the highest in Europe. It lies east of the saddle, below the Sphinx station, and is connected to the Top of Europe building, which includes several panoramic restaurants, shops, exhibitions, and a post office. Several tunnels lead outside, where secured hiking trails on the crevassed glacier can be followed, in particular to the Mönchsjoch Hut. The normal route to the Jungfrau and Mönch starts from there.

The Sphinx Observatory, one of the highest astronomical observatories in the world, provides an additional viewing platform at a height of 3,572 metres (11,719 ft), the second-highest in Switzerland. It can be reached by an elevator from the Jungfraujoch. The observatory houses one of the Global Atmosphere Watch's atmospheric research stations. The Jungfraujoch radio relay station, which is not accessible to the public, is installed west of the Jungfraujoch, on the Jungfrau ridge. It is Europe's highest radio relay station.

== Etymology ==
The Swiss- and Austro-Bavarian-German term Joch means "saddle", in this case referring to the ridge between two higher peaks, as recorded in the 14th century (Grimm, Deutsches Wörterbuch: "bereits im 14. jahrh. als ortsname: des gotzhus zwing und ban vahet an Rotenhalden und denne die roten bachtalen uf unz an den grat, und den grat obnan hin ob Grüblen hin iemerme, unz an Joch. und ab Joch unz an Stoerben. weisth. 1, 4 (Zürich)" (transl. "Appears as a place name as early as the 14th century: the monastery's jurisdiction and territory begin at Rotenhalden, then extend up the Rote Bachtal valley to the ridge, and along the top of the ridge above Grüblen all the way to the Joch; then from the Joch to Stoerben).

The name Jungfrau ('Virgin'), which refers to the highest mountain overlooking the Jungfraujoch, is most likely derived from the name Jungfrauenberg given to Wengernalp, so named for the nuns of Interlaken Monastery, its historical owner. However, the "virgin" peak was heavily romanticized as a "goddess" or "priestess" only in late 18th- to 19th-century Romanticism. After the first ascent in 1811 by Swiss alpinist Johann Rudolf Meyer, the peak was jokingly referred to as Mme Meyer (Mrs. Meyer).

== Geographic setting ==
The Jungfraujoch is a snow saddle located directly between the summits of Mathildespitze (west) and Sphinx (east). It is, however, most notably the lowest point between the Jungfrau and the Mönch, respectively third and fourth highest mountains in the Bernese Alps, and the key col of the former. The south side (canton of Valais), almost flat, is constituted by the Jungfraufirn, one of the branches of the Aletsch Glacier, the longest in the Alps. From the south, the Jungfraujoch can be relatively easily accessed by mountaineers in two days from the region of Fiesch, via the Konkordia Hut. The north side (canton of Bern) is almost vertical with a difference of height of nearly 3,000 metres from the bottom of the valley at Interlaken, with no easy natural access. For those reasons, the only easy and quick access to the Jungfraujoch is through the 7 kilometre-long tunnel of the Jungfrau Railway, accessed via Kleine Scheidegg on the north side, the railway pass between Lauterbrunnen and Grindelwald.

Administrativelly, the Jungfraujoch is split between the territories of the municipalities of Lauterbrunnen and Fieschertal. Nearly all built infrastructure, including the Jungfraujoch railway station, Top of Europe complex and the Sphinx Observatory, are on the Valais side of the border, therefore in the municipality of Fieschertal. The ridge between the Jungfrau and the Mönch is a major European watershed as well. The north side is drained by the Weisse Lütschine, the Aare and the Rhine. The south side is drained by the Massa and the Rhone.

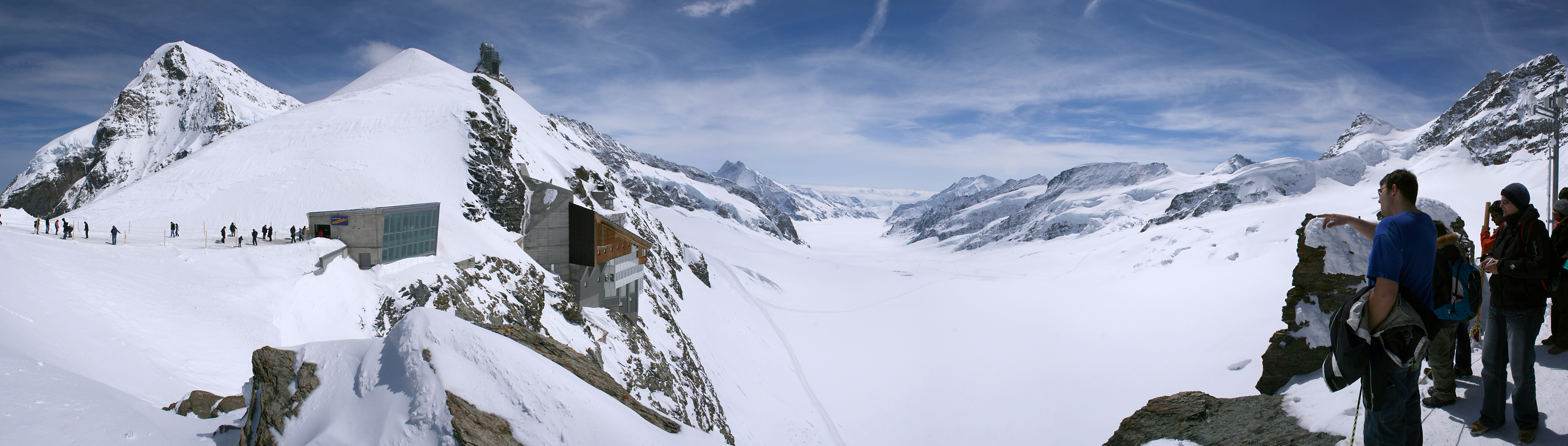
View from the summit of the saddle. From left to right: Mönch, Sphinx Observatory, Top of Europe complex, Aletsch Glacier and Jungfrau

== First crossing ==
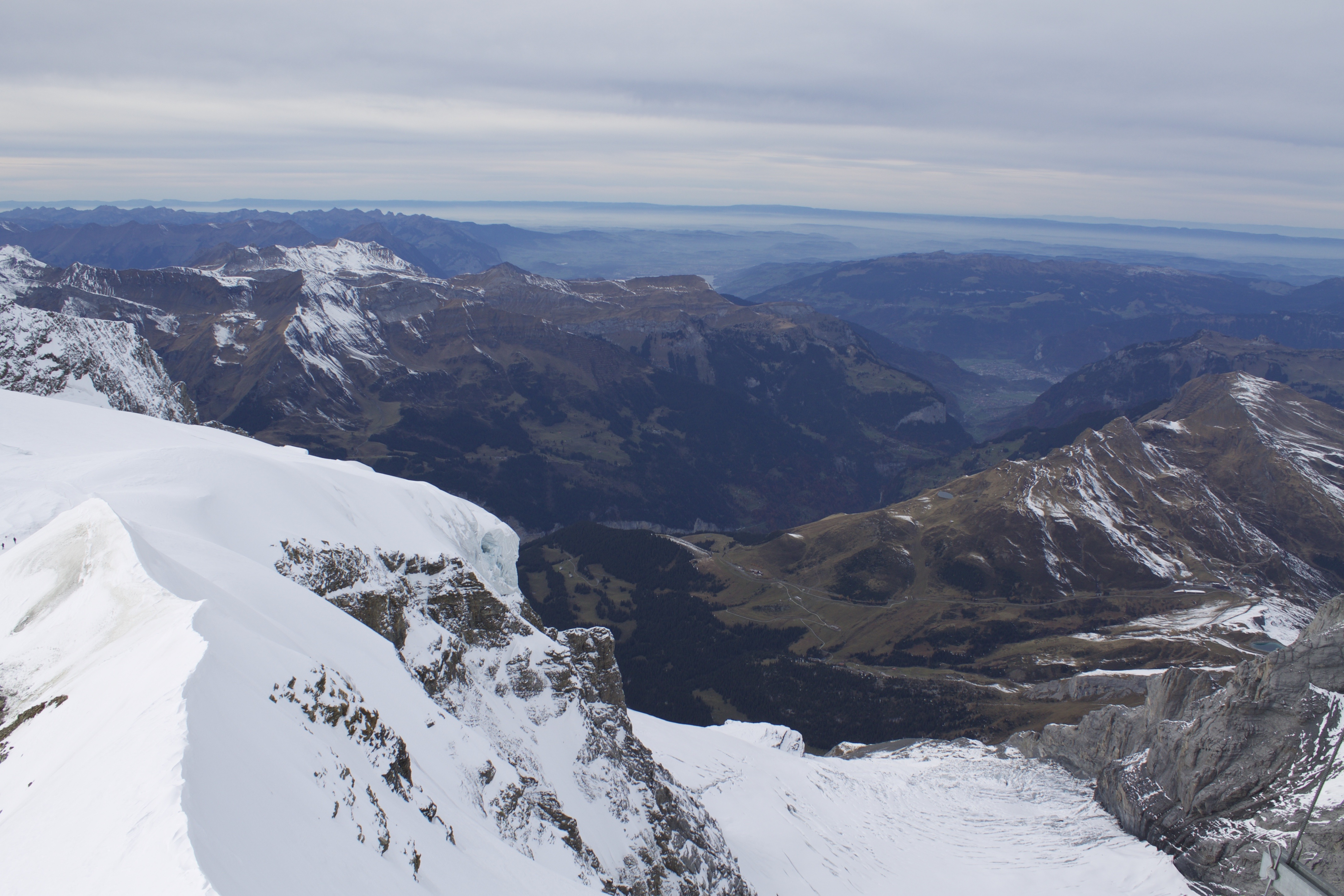
View from the Jungfraujoch towards Wengernalp and Interlaken. The Guggi Glacier is visible on the bottom right.

There is a tradition in the Bernese Oberland, supported by some documentary evidence, that a pass existed between Grindelwald and Fiesch in Valais in the late medieval period, later lost to the advancing glaciers. With the early development of tourism in Switzerland and the exploration of the High Alps in the 19th century, there were once again attempts to traverse the great ridge that encloses the head of the Aletsch Glacier, and connecting Fiesch with Grindelwald and Wengernalp. Four such routes were found, with the Jungfraujoch and the Eigerjoch being among the most difficult passes in the Alps, despite the former having a relatively easy southern approach on the Aletsch Glacier.

The first ascent of the north side of the Jungfraujoch succeeded in July 1862, by a party of six English climbers and six Swiss guides: Leslie Stephen, F. J. Hardy, H. B. George, Living, Moore, and Henry Morgan, with Christian Almer, Christian and Peter Michel, Ulrich Kauffmann, P. Baumann, and C. Bohren as guides. The time of ascent from Wengernalp was nine hours.

The party turned back on the first day at a bergschrund, returning on the following day with a ladder 25 ft (7.6 m) in length, carried by Peter Rubi, a porter from Grindelwald. The way lay at first by the rocky buttress of the Mönch, separating the Eiger and Guggi glaciers. From the buttress the route descended a short distance in order to reach the Guggi Glacier, which could be ascended to a plateau. This halting place was reached in about three hours.

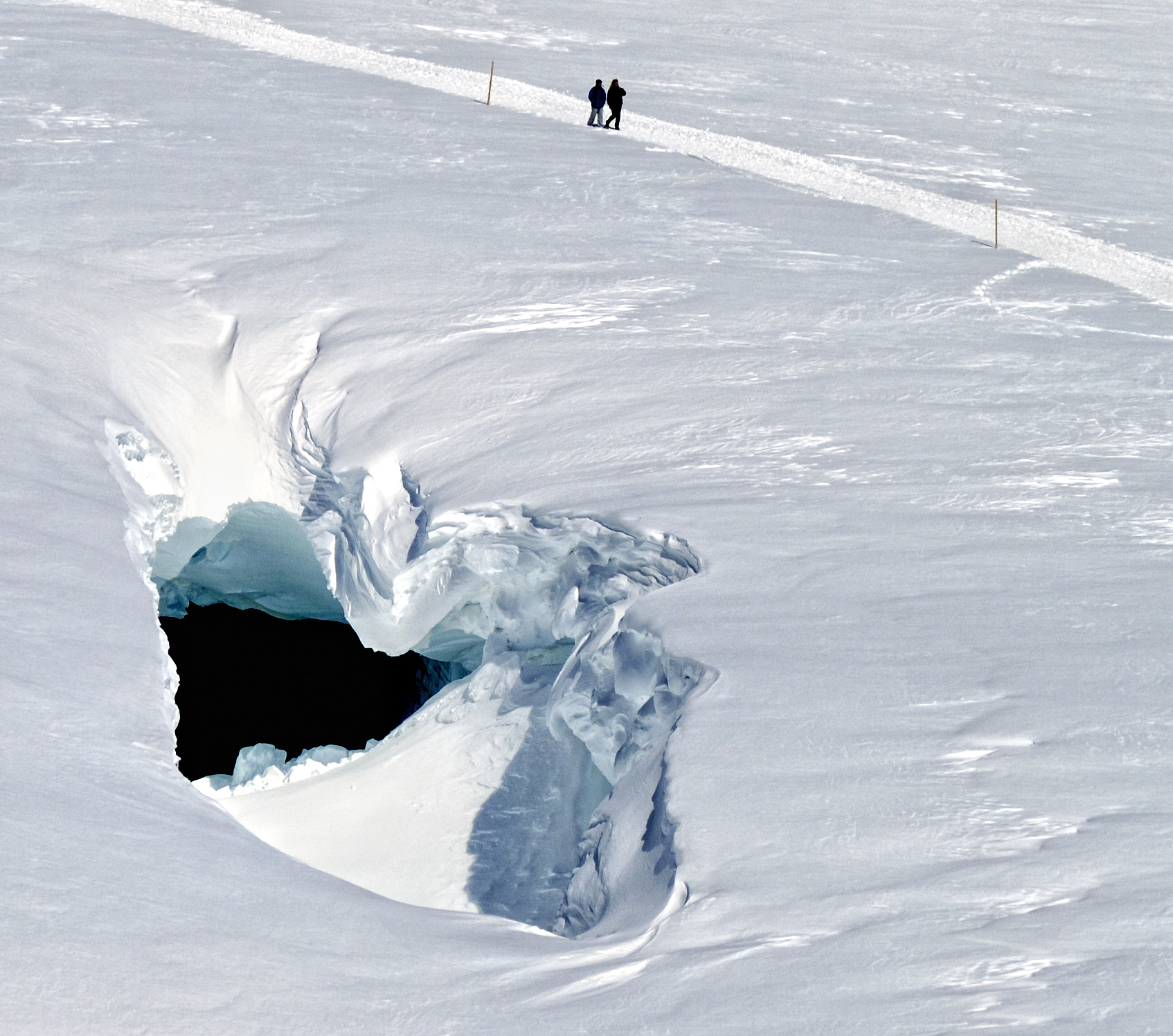
A crevasse near the Mönchsjoch Hut trail

Above the bergschrund was a second and smaller plateau which was situated immediately under the long slopes of broken neve that lay below the saddle. The final and very arduous stage in the ascent was a single patch of dark rocks jutted out from the snow in the ridge connecting the Jungfrau with the Mönch. After more than an hour of climbing, a great wall of ice, whose projecting cornice of snow was fringed by long icicles, had to be avoided bearing left in the direction of the Mönch, along the base of the wall by a slippery pathway of ice formed from the dripping from the icicles above. At a point where the pathway thinned out nearly to a point, and was cut across by a transverse crevasse, the wall became low enough to be scaled by the ladder. This was the last serious obstacle: a moderate slope of névé, unbroken by crevasses, then led up to the summit of the saddle.

After reaching the first patch of rocks, a short way below the saddle on the south side, the party divided: George and Moore, with C. Almer and U. Kaufmann went down to the Eggishorn and Fiesch, therefore completing the first crossing of the Jungfraujoch, while the remainder of the party returned to Grindelwald by the Mönchsjoch.

== Jungfrau Railway ==
=== History ===
Adolf Guyer-Zeller first thought of the idea of a tunnel in 1893, and at that point, he had planned to have seven stations inside the tunnel before reaching the peak of the Sphinx. The building of the tunnel started on July 27, 1896 and took 16 years to complete. The construction phase was troubled by many problems including monetary shortages, inclement weather and mounting deaths due to construction accidents. The worst accident occurred in 1908, when 30 tons of dynamite accidentally exploded.

When construction finally finished, the railway reached only to the height of the Jungfraujoch saddle, rather than the summit of the Sphinx, and had only two intermediate stations. However, even in its current state, the Jungfraubahn is a significant achievement in engineering and construction, still holding the title for highest railway in Europe.

=== Railway ===
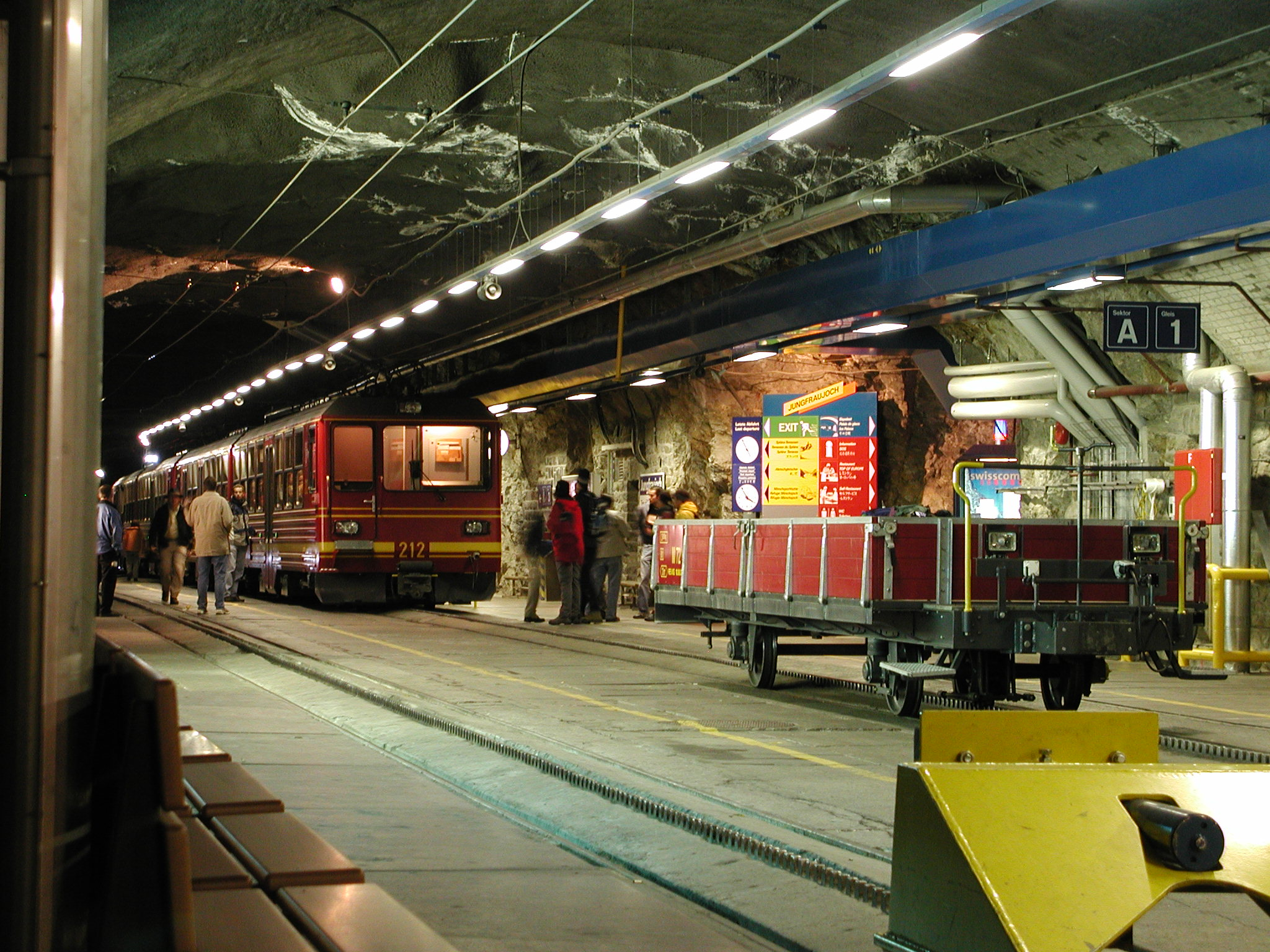
The Jungfraujoch railway station at 3,450 meters (11,320 ft) above sea level

The train into the mountain leaves from Kleine Scheidegg, which can be reached by trains from Grindelwald and Lauterbrunnen. The train enters the tunnel running eastward through the Eiger shortly after leaving Kleine Scheidegg.

It runs close behind the Eiger's north face, stopping at Eigerwand, where there is a window about 8 m long and a metre high, halfway up the face. The windows have been placed in holes used to remove excavated rock from the tunnel during construction, and are also occasionally used as access points, by climbers, and also rescue parties. This window was used for one of the final scenes of a Clint Eastwood spy movie, The Eiger Sanction. There one can get off the train to admire the view before the train continues five minutes later. The tunnel then turns west, heading towards the Jungfrau. There is a second stop at a window looking out on the Eismeer ("Sea of Ice") before the train continues to the Jungfraujoch. The tunnel was constructed between 1898 and 1912; it is about 7 kilometers (4.3 mi) long, with gradients of up to 25%. The journey from Kleine Scheidegg to Jungfraujoch takes approximately 50 minutes including the stops at Eigerwand and Eismeer; the downhill return journey taking only 35 minutes.

The Jungfraujoch complex plays an important role in John Christopher's The Tripods novels.

== Climate ==
Located above the permanent snow line, the Jungfraujoch is officially the coldest place in Switzerland, although other higher locations with no weather station, for example the top of the nearby Jungfrau and Finsteraarhorn, probably experience a more extreme climate. According to Köppen climate classification, the Jungfraujoch has an alpine climate on the border between tundra climate (ET) and ice cap climate (EF) with long, cold winters lasting most of the year and a brief period during summer where the average daily highs rise above freezing.

Climate data for Jungfraujoch, elevation: 3,580 m (11,745 ft), 1991–2020 normals, extremes 1973–present
Month	Jan	Feb	Mar	Apr	May	Jun	Jul	Aug	Sep	Oct	Nov	Dec	Year
Record high °C (°F)	4.2 (39.6)	2.9 (37.2)	8.2 (46.8)	4.9 (40.8)	10.0 (50.0)	13.1 (55.6)	14.3 (57.7)	12.8 (55.0)	11.6 (52.9)	10.0 (50.0)	4.5 (40.1)	7.1 (44.8)	14.3 (57.7)
Mean daily maximum °C (°F)	−9.5 (14.9)	−10.2 (13.6)	−8.6 (16.5)	−6.3 (20.7)	−2.1 (28.2)	1.7 (35.1)	3.4 (38.1)	3.5 (38.3)	0.5 (32.9)	−2.2 (28.0)	−6.5 (20.3)	−8.7 (16.3)	−3.8 (25.2)
Daily mean °C (°F)	−12.5 (9.5)	−13.3 (8.1)	−11.6 (11.1)	−9.4 (15.1)	−5.2 (22.6)	−1.5 (29.3)	0.4 (32.7)	0.6 (33.1)	−2.4 (27.7)	−4.9 (23.2)	−9.2 (15.4)	−11.7 (10.9)	−6.7 (19.9)
Mean daily minimum °C (°F)	−15.5 (4.1)	−16.3 (2.7)	−14.4 (6.1)	−12.0 (10.4)	−7.8 (18.0)	−4.0 (24.8)	−2.1 (28.2)	−1.7 (28.9)	−4.7 (23.5)	−7.4 (18.7)	−11.8 (10.8)	−14.5 (5.9)	−9.4 (15.1)
Record low °C (°F)	−34.2 (−29.6)	−35.4 (−31.7)	−28.9 (−20.0)	−25.2 (−13.4)	−22.0 (−7.6)	−16.4 (2.5)	−14.0 (6.8)	−13.0 (8.6)	−16.0 (3.2)	−21.7 (−7.1)	−30.0 (−22.0)	−30.7 (−23.3)	−35.4 (−31.7)
Average relative humidity (%)	63	65	67	72	78	77	76	74	71	66	68	65	70
Mean monthly sunshine hours	117.0	122.5	161.3	159.5	152.4	169.7	181.0	183.4	174.7	144.8	106.1	100.8	1,773.2
Percentage possible sunshine	49	51	48	44	37	40	43	48	50	53	44	45	45
Source 1: NOAA
Source 2: MeteoSwiss; Infoclimat.fr (extremes)

== See also ==
- List of mountain passes in Switzerland
- Tourism in Switzerland
