= Konkordia Hut =

Mountain hut in Switzerland

Coordinates: 46°30′01.7″N 8°03′11.7″E

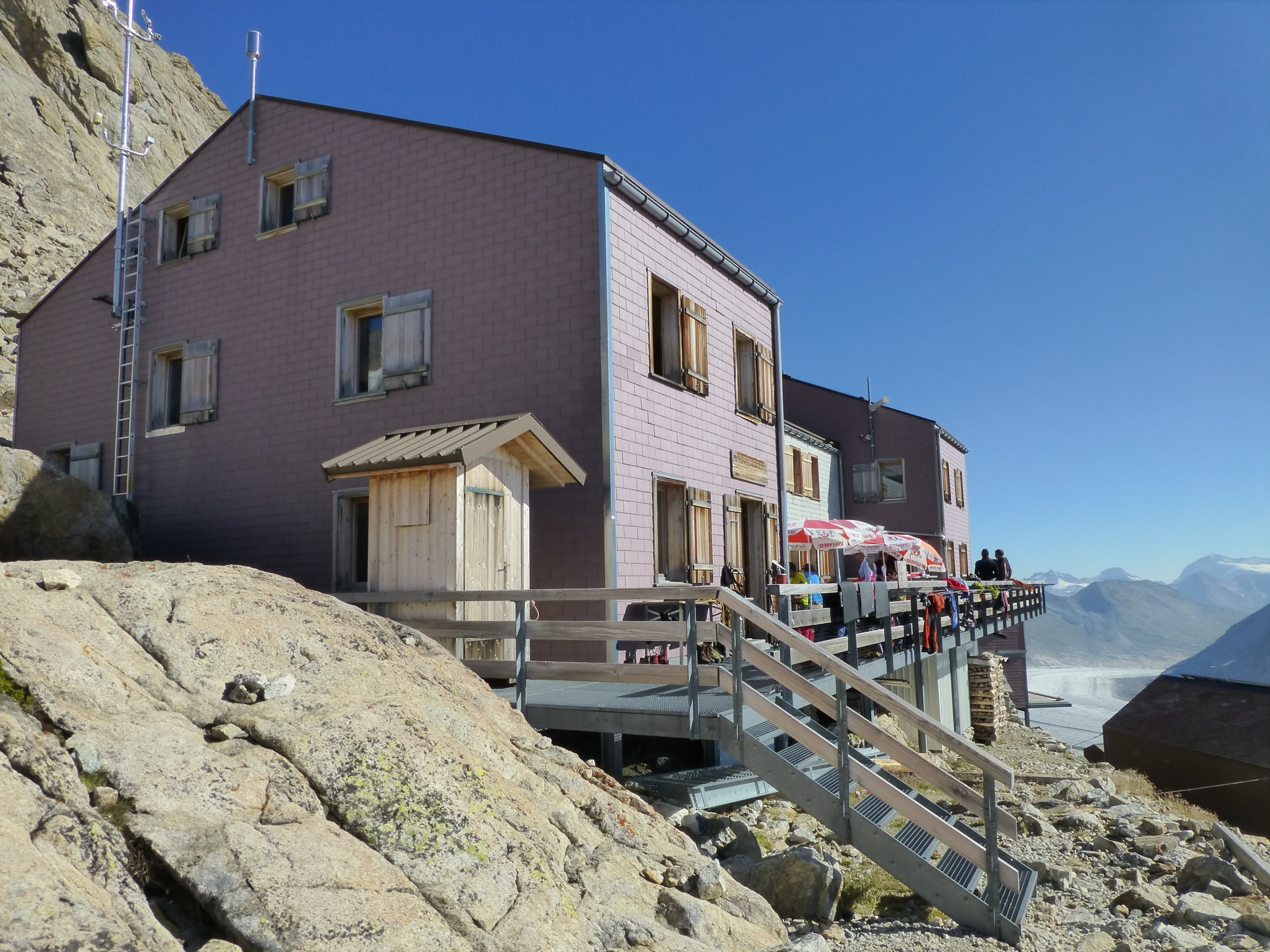
The Konkordia Hut

The Konkordia Hut (German: Konkordiahütte) is a mountain hut of the Swiss Alpine Club, located north of Fieschertal in the canton of Valais. The hut lies above Konkordiaplatz, the point of convergence of several glaciers in the great Aletsch Glacier system of the Bernese Alps. It is located at a height of 2,850 metres above sea level, at the foot of the Fülbärg.

== Access ==
Because of its location, the hut is a long way from villages (six hours from Fiescheralp, ten hours from Fafleralp). The shortest route starts at the Jungfraujoch railway station (four hours). All access routes are via the Aletsch Glacier. The hut lies approximately 150 metres above the level of the ice. The hut can be reached by stairs or via an unsecured steep path from the level of the ice.
