= Mönch =

Mountain in the Bernese Alps, in Switzerland

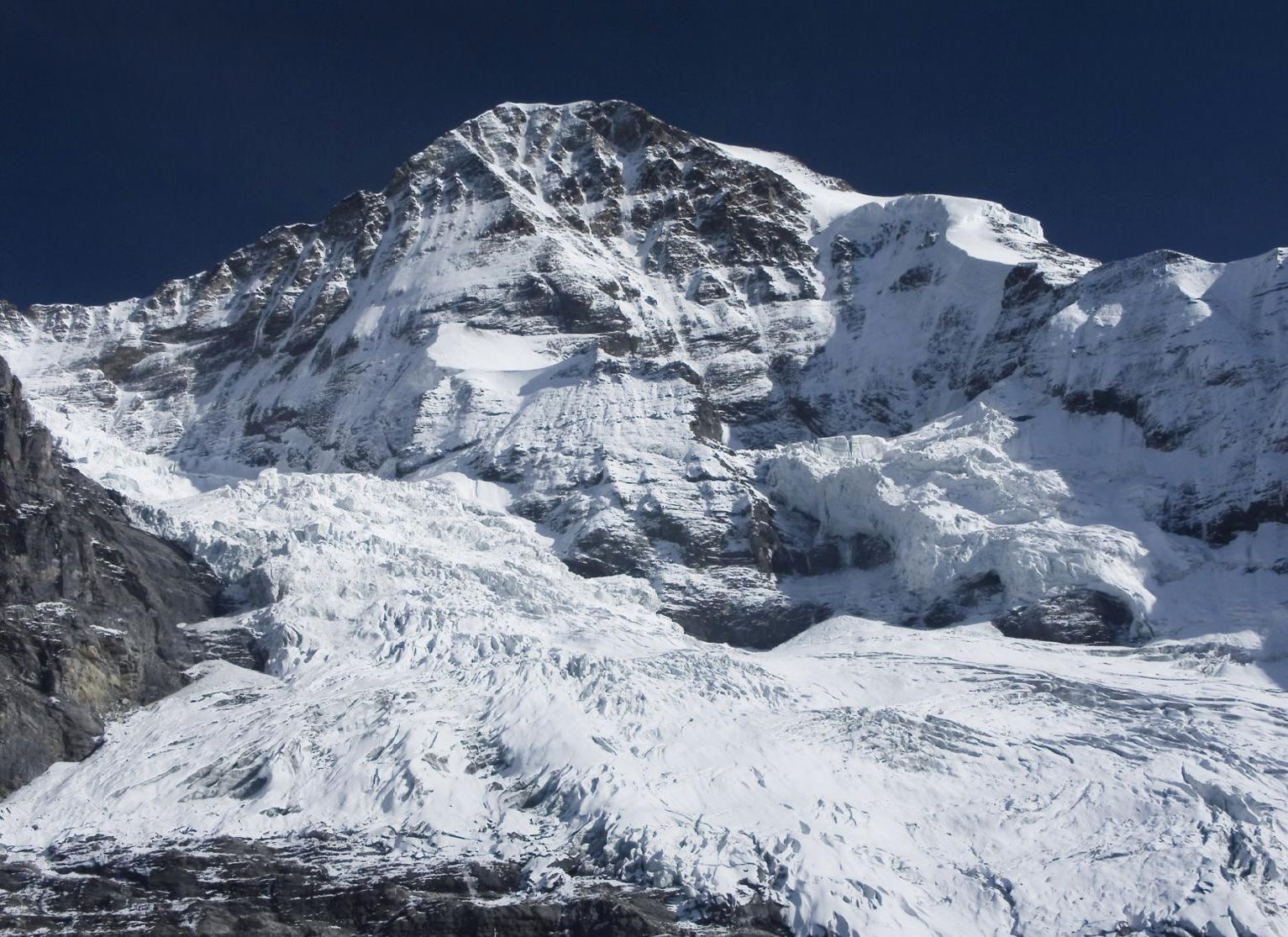
- The Mönch north face dominating the Eiger Glacier (which flows from left to right).

Highest point
- Elevation: 4,110 m (13,480 ft)
- Prominence: 591 m (1,939 ft)
- Parent peak: Finsteraarhorn
- Isolation: 3.6 km (2.2 mi)
- Coordinates: 46°33′30″N 7°59′50″E

Naming
- English translation: Monk

Geography
- Location within Switzerland
- Location: Bern/Valais, Switzerland
- Parent range: Bernese Alps

Geology
- Mountain type: Limestone

Climbing
- First ascent: August 15, 1857
- Easiest route: basic rock/snow/ice climb

The Mönch (German pronunciation: [ˈmœnç], German: "monk") at 4,110 metres (13,480 ft) is a mountain in the Bernese Alps, in Switzerland. Together with the Eiger and the Jungfrau, it forms a highly recognisable group of mountains, visible from far away.

The Mönch lies on the border between the cantons of Valais and Bern, and forms part of a mountain ridge between the Jungfrau and Jungfraujoch to the west, and the Eiger to the east. It is west of Mönchsjoch, a pass at 3,650 metres (11,980 ft), Mönchsjoch Hut, and north of the Jungfraufirn and Ewigschneefäld, two affluents of the Great Aletsch Glacier. The north side of the Mönch forms a step wall above the Lauterbrunnen valley.

The Jungfrau railway tunnel runs right under the summit, at an elevation of approximately 3,300 metres (10,830 ft).

The summit was first climbed on record on 15 August 1857 by Christian Almer, Christian Kaufmann (1831-1861), Ulrich Kaufmann and Sigismund Porges.

== Gallery ==
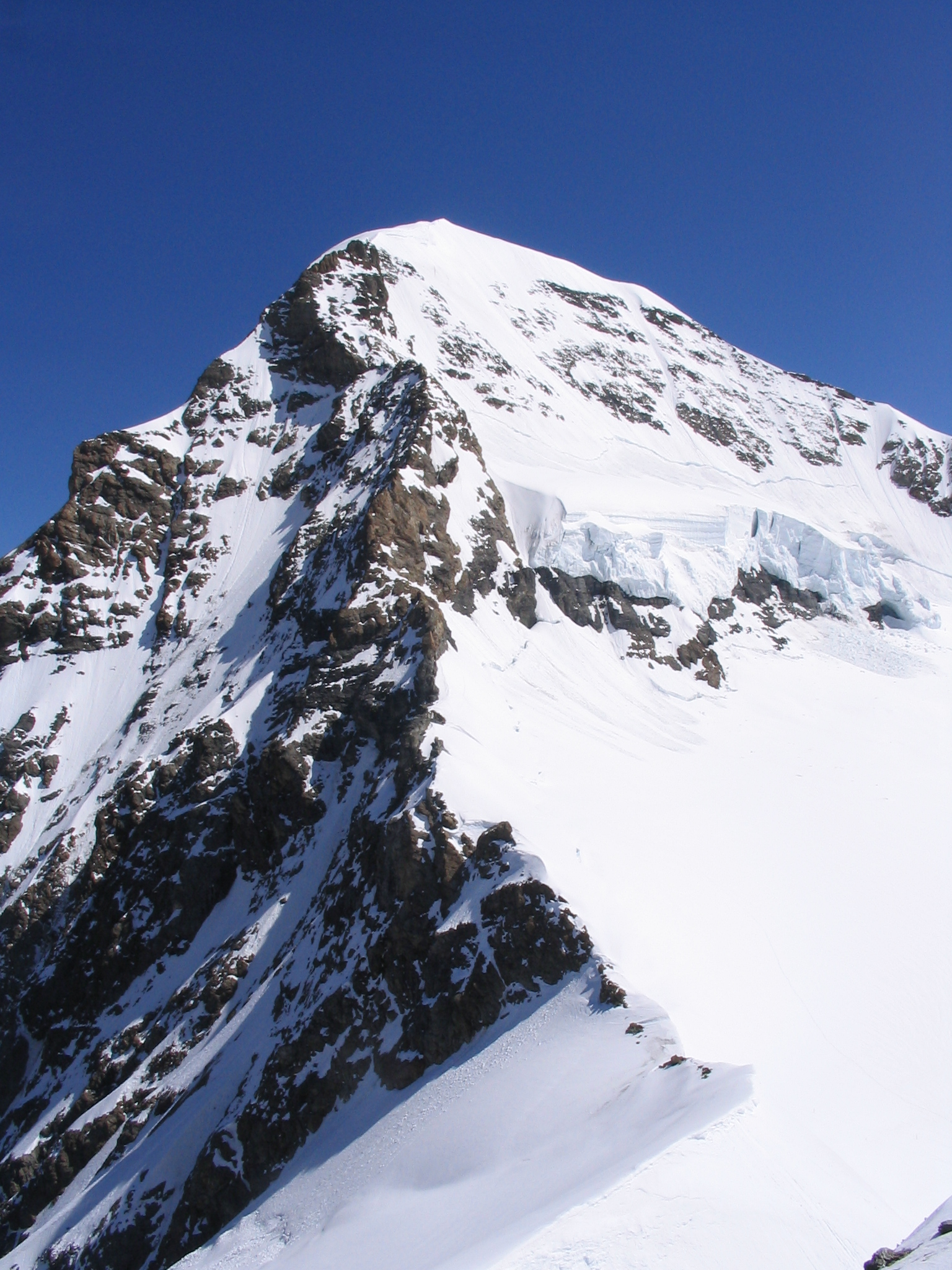
A view of the Mönch taken from the Jungfraujoch

Aerial view from the east

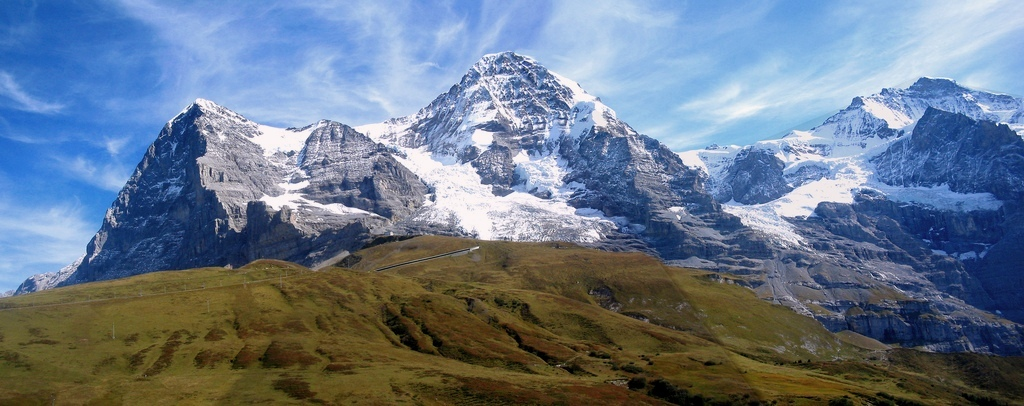
Panorama from Männlichen: Eiger, Mönch and Jungfrau (from left to right)

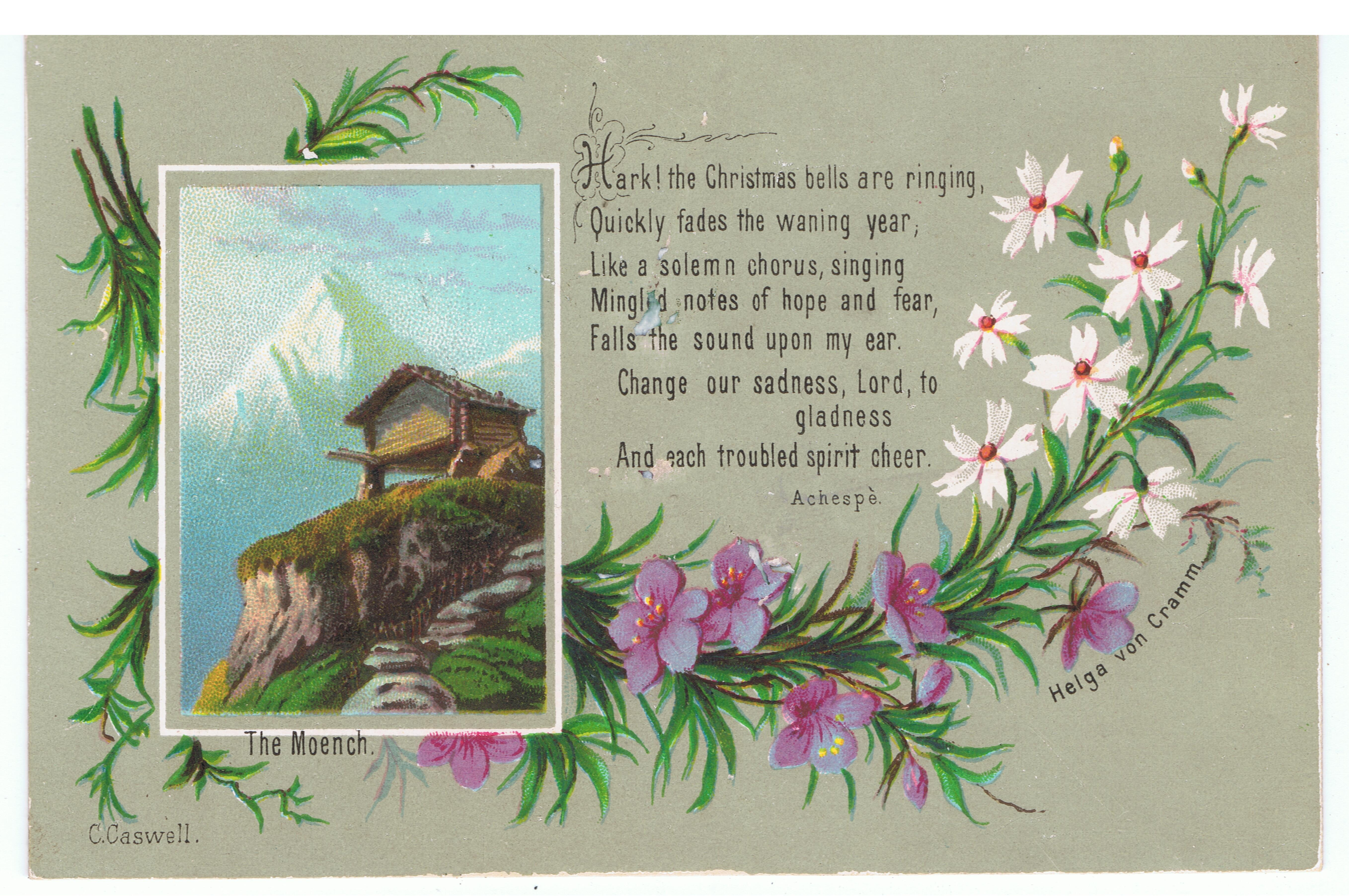
The Moench, by Helga von Cramm, with prayer by Achespè, chromolithograph, c. 1879. (3 x 4.5 inches).

== See also ==
- List of 4000 metre peaks of the Alps
