= Kleines Schreckhorn =

Mountain in Switzerland

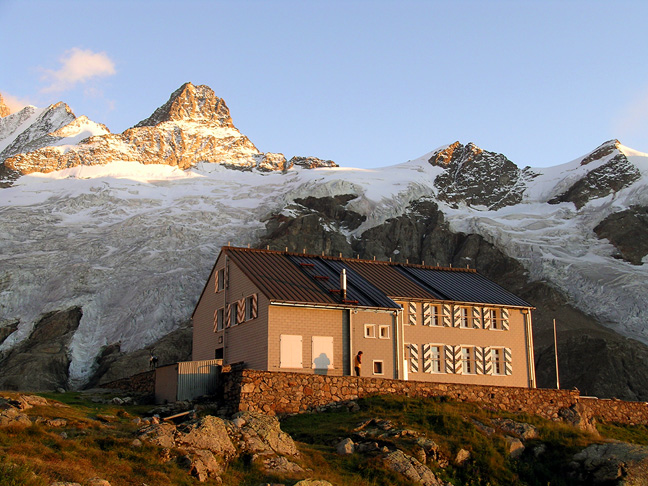
- The Schreckhorn seen from the Gleckstein Hut

Highest point
- Elevation: 3,495 m (11,467 ft)
- Prominence: 100 m (330 ft)
- Parent peak: Schreckhorn
- Coordinates: 46°36′06″N 8°06′08.6″E

Geography
- Location within Switzerland
- Location: Bern, Switzerland
- Parent range: Bernese Alps

The Kleines Schreckhorn is a mountain of the Bernese Alps, located south of Grindelwald in the Bernese Oberland. It lies between the valleys of the Lower Grindelwald Glacier and the Upper Grindelwald Glacier, north of the Schreckhorn.
