= Wetterhorn Elevator =

Aerial tramway in Grindelwald, Switzerland (1908–1915)

Coordinates: 46°37′51.564″N 8°4′41.448″E

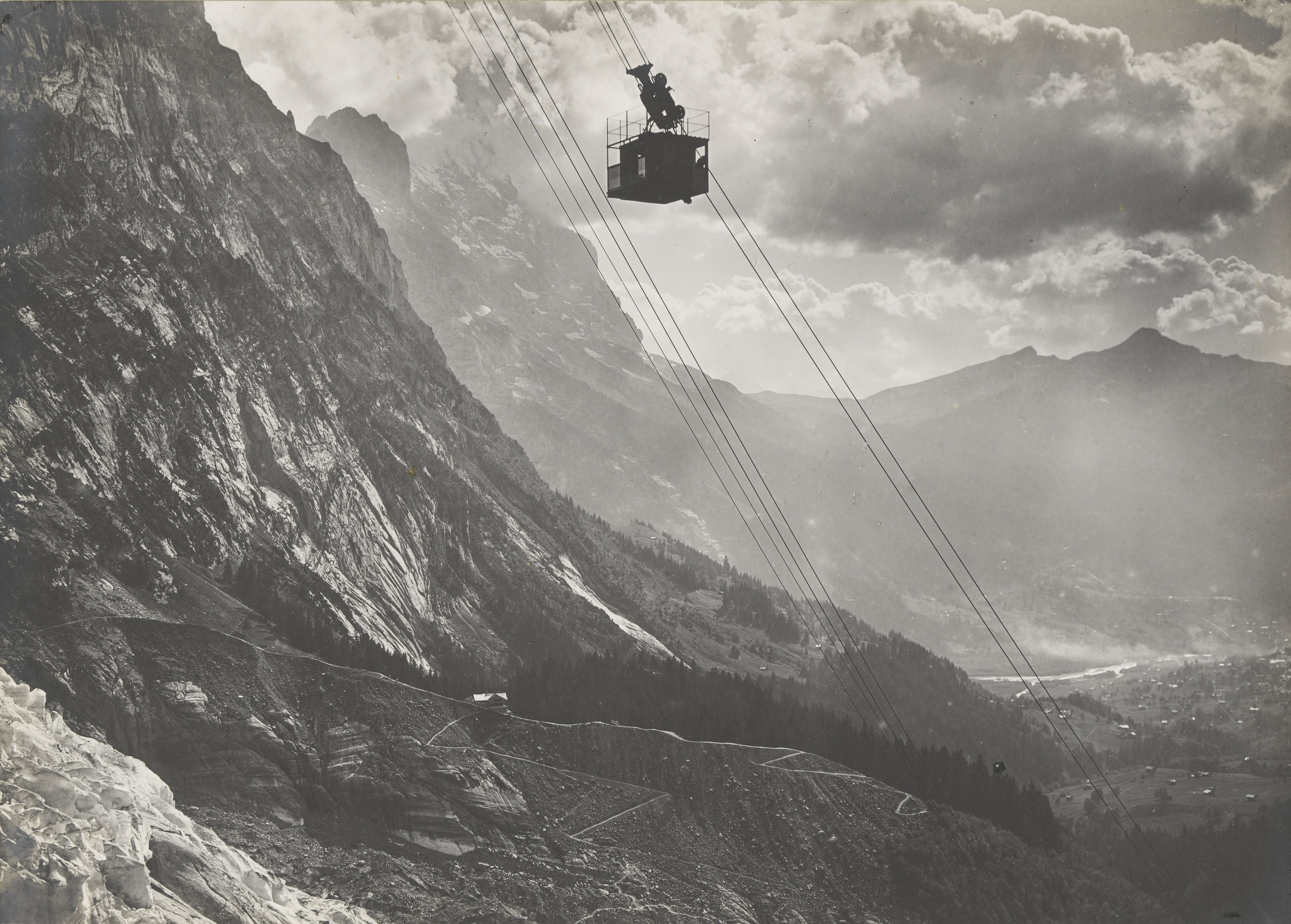
The Wetterhorn Elevator depicted in 1909 (the glacier is visible on the bottom left)

The Wetterhorn Elevator (German: Wetterhorn-Aufzug) was an aerial tramway in the valley of Grindelwald. It connected the base of the Upper Grindelwald Glacier to a higher location in the Wetterhorn massif. The tramway was inaugurated in 1908, making it the first of its kind in Switzerland. It closed only a few years later in 1915.

The facility was referred to as an elevator because of the 116% average gradient of the suspension cables. The height difference was 420 metres.

At the time of the opening, the Wetterhorn Elevator has been described as the world's first modern aerial cableway system. Since there were no concessions yet for such type of transport, an automobile concession form had to be used instead.

== History ==
In 1905, Wilhelm Feldmann began building the first Swiss cable car on the Wetterhorn, near the Hotel Wetterhorn east of Grindelwald, the later being located near the bottom of the Upper Grindelwald Glacier. Originally it was intended to lead the aerial tramway in four sections to the summit of the 3701 m high Wetterhorn.

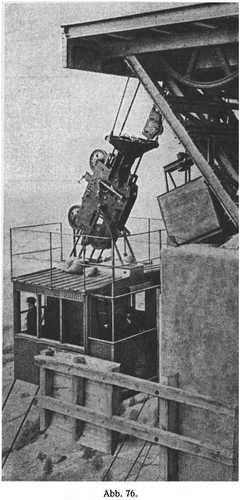
The mountain station in 1912

In 1908, the first section from the Hotel Wetterhorn east of Grindelwald to the Enge mountain station at 1,677 m was put into operation. The route ran over the (now melted) tongue of the Upper Grindelwald Glacier to the meadows at the upper end of the «Ischpfad», where the ruins of the mountain station still stand below the path to the Gleckstein Hut. Like an eagle's nest, the Enge mountain station is embedded in the rock face above the Upper Grindelwald glacier at the foot of the Wetterhorn.

This section was to be extended along the southwestern ridge of the Wetterhorn to the Krinnenhorn area.

The tramway, very popular with tourists, could transport 110 people per hour and direction. Although there were no specific regulations at the time, the system had all the essential safety features of today's aerial cableways. For example, there were two carrying cables and two traction cables as well as two independent braking systems. The drives of the cabins were equipped with safety brakes and, in addition to a manual emergency drive (in the event of a power failure), there was also a rescue system in the event of a jammed cabin.

The cabs, machinery and braking systems were built by the Ludwig von Roll'sche Eisenwerke company in Bern. The wire ropes came from Germany and had to be transported by horse from Grindelwald station to the construction site.

The Wetterhorn Elevator, finally inaugurated on July 27, 1908, was a pioneering achievement, as it was the first cable car to transport people in Switzerland. It was a combination of a lift and an aerial tramway with two suspension cables.

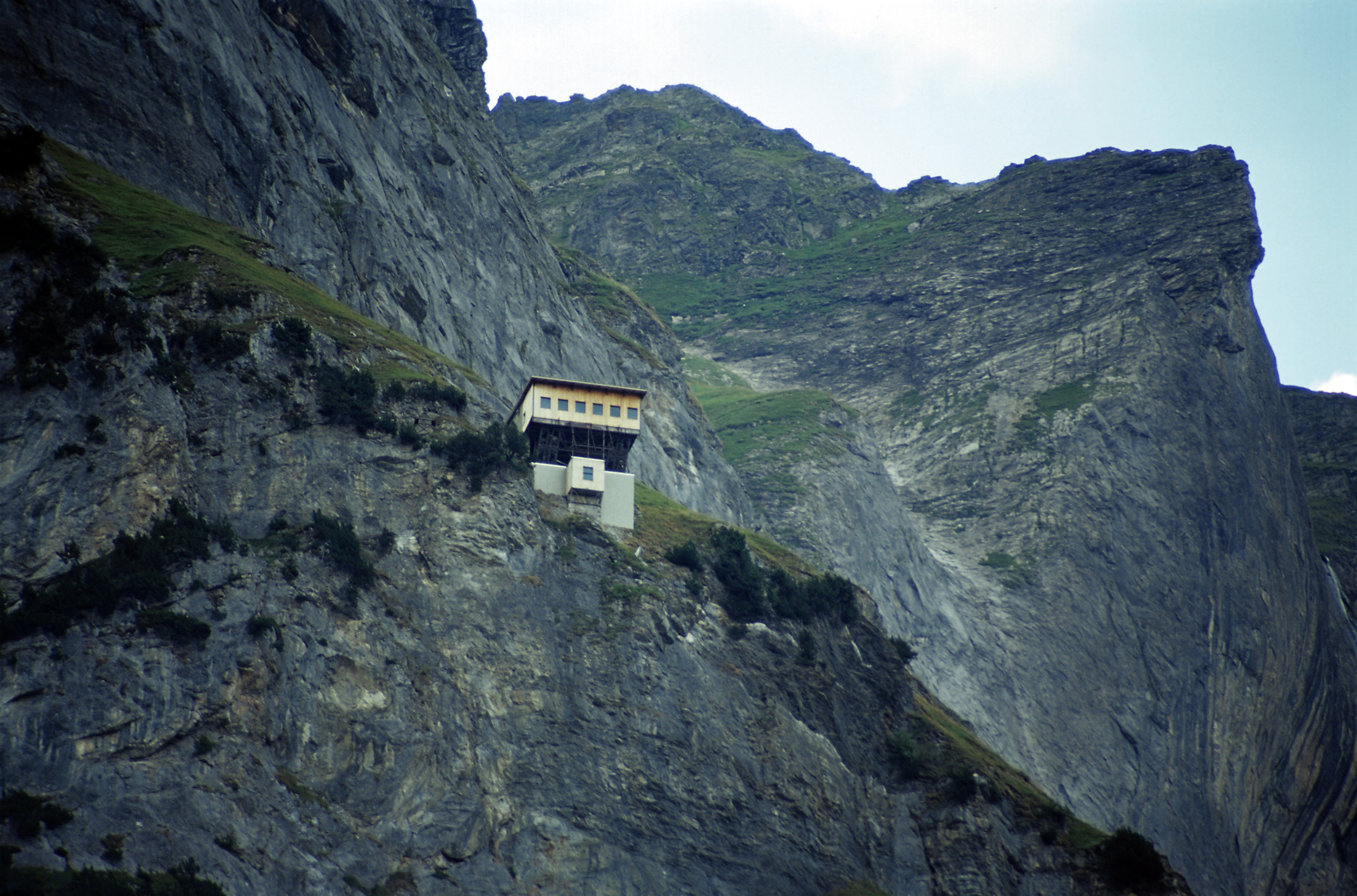
The mountain station in 2003

Initially, this tramway was a great success. Although well ahead of its time, the Wetterhorn Elevator ceased operations in 1915 due to a lack of tourists following the outbreak of World War I. It was not reinstated for various reasons. In particular, the location of the mountain station of the first section on a sloping ledge was not very attractive.

Today only the ruins of the Enge mountain station and the foundations of the valley station remain. The mountain station has already been renovated once to save it from decay.

At the nearby Hotel Wetterhorn there is a replica of a cabin based on the original steel frame. An original cab drive is on display in the Swiss Museum of Transport in Lucerne.

== Bibliography ==
- Werner Neuhaus: Wetterhornaufzug, die erste Luftseilbahn der Schweiz. Prellbock Druck & Verlag, Leissigen 2007, ISBN 978-3-907579-50-3.
- Werner Neuhaus: Wetterhornaufzug, die erste Luftseilbahn der Schweiz. Schriften der Heimatvereinigung Grindelwald, Nr. 4, Grindelwald 1976.

== See also ==
- Jungfrau Railway, another ambitious project in the region aiming at the Jungfrau
