= Gleckstein Hut =

Mountain hut near Grindelwald, Switzerland

Coordinates: 46°37′30″N 8°05′47″E

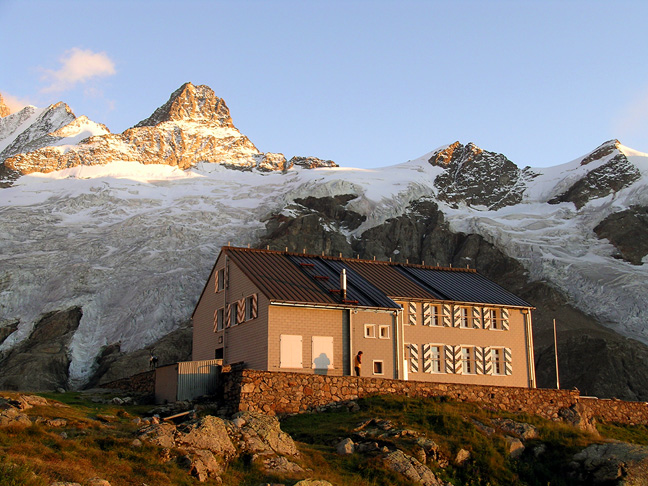
The Gleckstein Hut with the Kleines Schreckhorn in background

The Gleckstein Hut (German: Glecksteinhütte) is a mountain hut of the Swiss Alpine Club, located east of Grindelwald in the Swiss canton of Bern. The hut lies at a height of 2,317 metres above sea level, above the Upper Grindelwald Glacier, at the foot of the Wetterhorn in the Bernese Alps.

In addition to be a popular goal for hikers, the hut is used for the ascent of the Wetterhorn and the Schreckhorn.

== Getting there ==
The hike is challenging and steep. Hikers must cross narrow paths with cables along the rock face to help prevent falling. It requires proper hiking equipment, such as boots, hiking pole, and rain jacket.

If it rains, it is extremely treacherous to approach or descend from Gleckstein Hut. When raining, the path at one point becomes a dangerous raging waterfall. If you reach the top and are unsure if you can safely return, helicopter companies will not save you without the staff at the Gleckstein Hut calling emergency line.

== The restaurant ==
Gleckstein Hut allows for reservations to stay at the hut. Staff will provide meals and drinks. Sparkling water and beer are on tap.
