= Rosenhorn =

Mountain in Switzerland

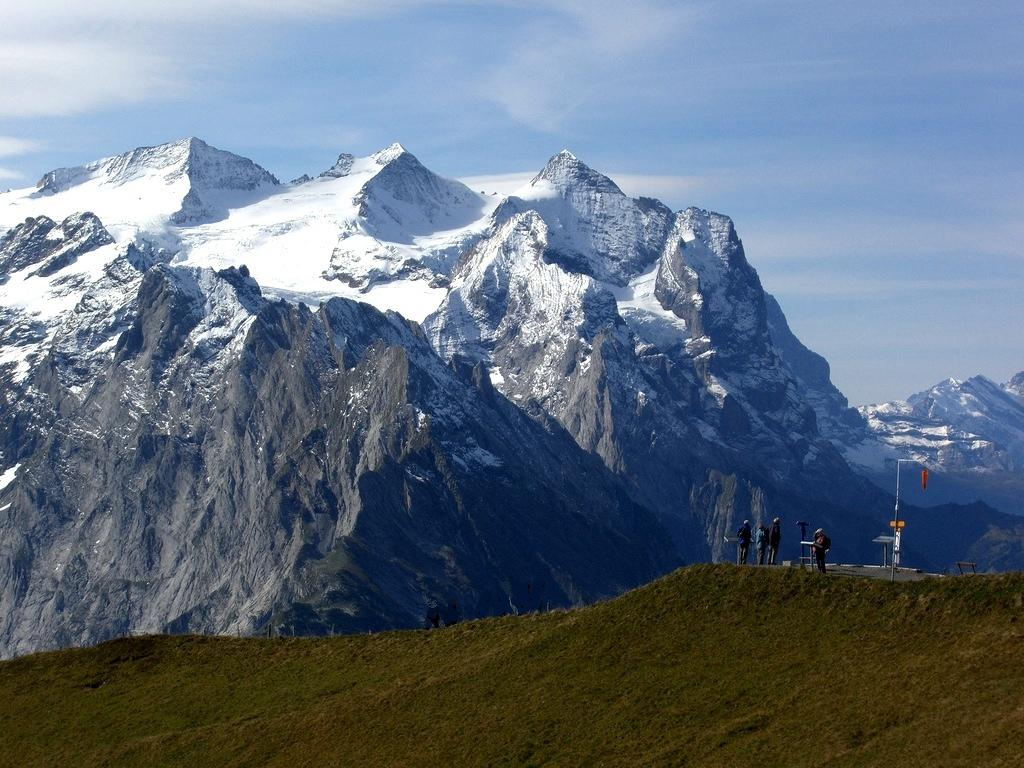
- Rosenhorn (left), Mittelhorn (centre) and Wetterhorn (right)

Highest point
- Elevation: 3,689 m (12,103 ft)
- Prominence: 193 m (633 ft)
- Parent peak: Mittelhorn
- Coordinates: 46°37′54.8″N 8°08′13.8″E

Geography
- Location within Switzerland
- Location: Bern, Switzerland
- Parent range: Bernese Alps

Climbing
- Easiest route: rock/snow/ice climb

The Rosenhorn (3,689 m) is a peak in the Bernese Alps in the Bernese Oberland. It is lowest of the three composing the Wetterhorner massif, and most distant from the alpine village of Grindelwald to the southwest.

The Rosenhorn is entirely surrounded by glaciers: the Rosenlaui on the north side, the Upper Grindelwald on the south, and the Gauli on the east.
