= Mittelhorn =

Mountain in Switzerland

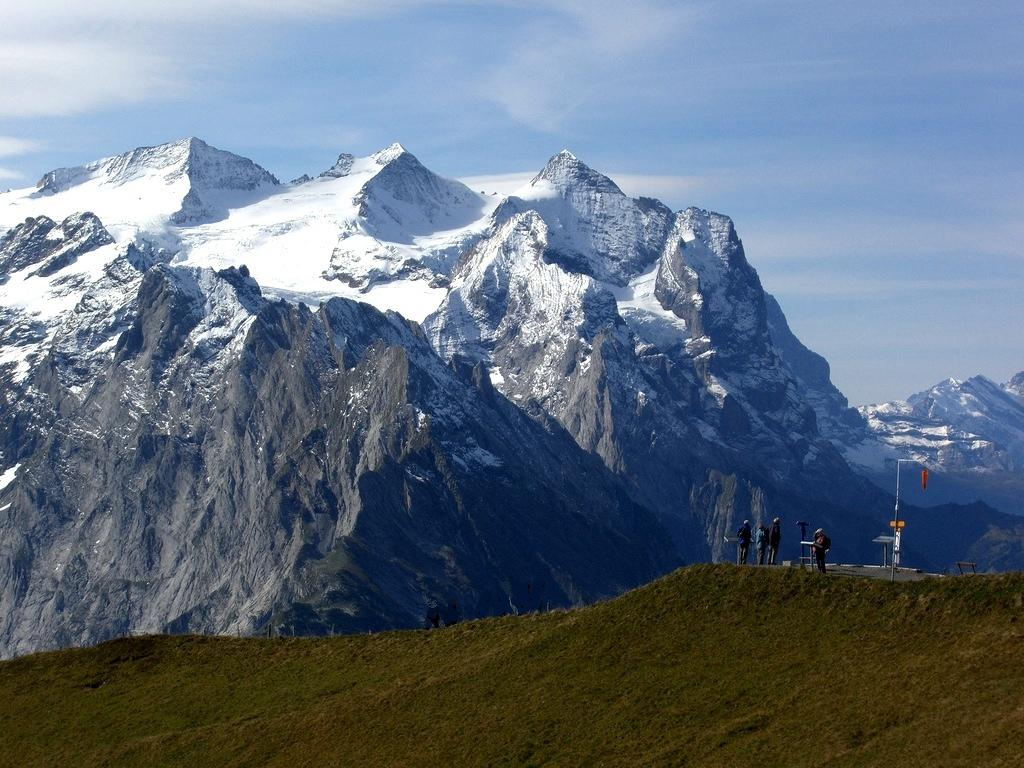
- Mittelhorn between the Rosenhorn (left) and Wetterhorn (right)

Highest point
- Elevation: 3,702 m (12,146 ft)
- Prominence: 578 m (1,896 ft)
- Parent peak: Finsteraarhorn
- Listing: Alpine mountains above 3000 m
- Coordinates: 46°38′06.4″N 8°07′29.7″E

Geography
- Location within Switzerland
- Location: Bern, Switzerland
- Parent range: Bernese Alps

Climbing
- First ascent: 9 July 1845 by Kaspar Abplanalp, Melchior Bannholzer, Hans Jaun and Stanhope Templeman Speer
- Easiest route: rock/snow/ice climb

The Mittelhorn (3,702 m) is a peak in the Swiss Alps close to the village of Grindelwald. It is the highest of the three composing the Wetterhorner massif.

== See also ==
- List of mountains of Switzerland
