= Agassizhorn =

Mountain in Switzerland

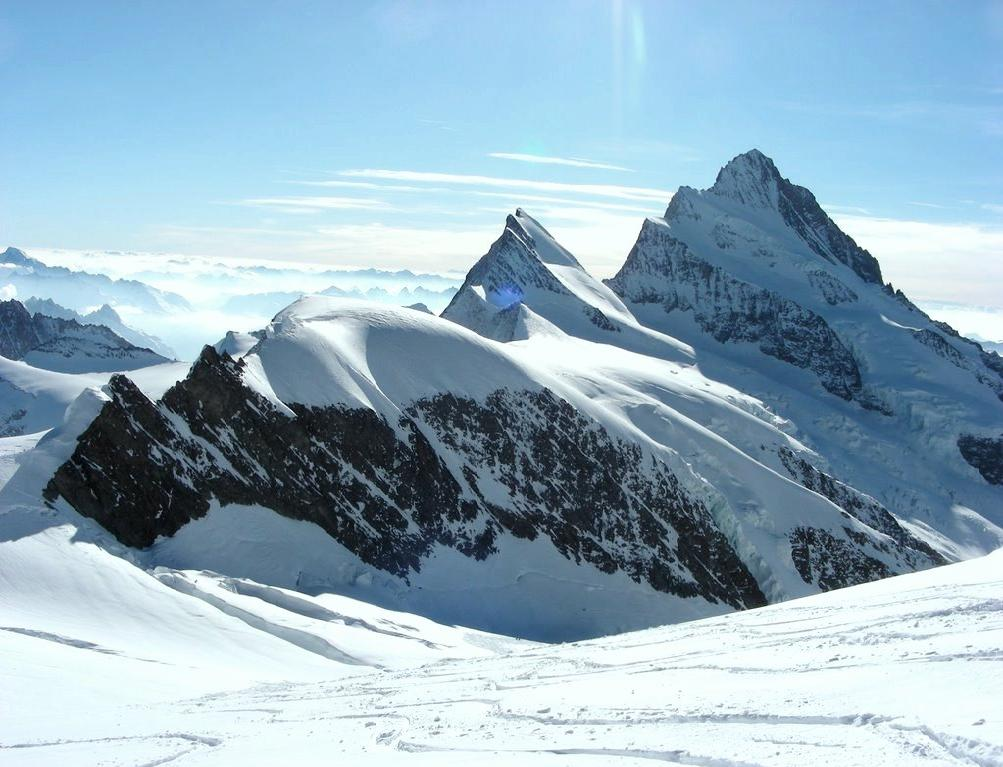
- Agassizhorn (centre) between Fieschergrat (left) and Finsteraarhorn (right)

Highest point
- Elevation: 3,947 m (12,949 ft)
- Prominence: 200 m (660 ft)
- Parent peak: Finsteraarhorn
- Coordinates: 46°32′47.69″N 08°06′51.98″E

Geography
- Location within Switzerland
- Location: Bern/Valais, Switzerland
- Parent range: Bernese Alps

The Agassizhorn is a mountain of the Bernese Alps in Switzerland. It lies just north-west of the Finsteraarhorn, the main summit of the range. The Agassizhorn is the tripoint between the valleys of the Lower Grindelwald Glacier, the Unteraar Glacier and the Fiescher Glacier. Because the Lower Grindelwald and Unteraar glaciers drain into the Aar and hence the Rhine and North Sea, whilst the Fiescher glacier drains into the Rhone and hence the Mediterranean Sea, the Sidelhorn lies on the European continental divide.

Administratively, the summit is shared between the municipalities of Grindelwald, to the north-west, Guttannen, to the north-east, and Fieschertal, to the south. Grindelwald and Guttannen are in the canton of Bern, whilst Fieschertal is in the canton of Valais.

The mountain was named after the Swiss geologist and explorer Louis Agassiz.

== See also ==
- List of mountains of Switzerland named after people
