= Daniel Hofmann =

Swiss luger

Daniel Hofmann (born 1996, in Grindelwald) is a Swiss natural track luger. He began competing in the World Cup, FIL World Luge Natural Track Championships, and the FIL European Luge Natural Track Championships in 2011.

Hofmann's first major international competition was the FIL World Luge Natural Track Championships 2011 in Umhausen. The athlete from the Grindelwald Luge and Sled Club was the youngest participant at 14 years old and finished 36th out of 40 competitors in the singles event. A week later, he competed in the 2011 Junior European Championships in Laas, where he finished 26th out of 29 competitors. At the end of the 2010/2011 season, Hofmann made his World Cup debut at the final in Olang, finishing in 33rd and last place. In the 2011/2012 season, Hofmann participated in another World Cup race in Železniki, where he finished 34th, ahead of two competitors. He also competed in international championships. He finished 23rd out of 27 lugers at the 2012 Junior World Championships in Latsch and 27th out of 31 lugers at the 2012 European Championships in Novouralsk.
