= Lower Grindelwald Glacier =

Glacier in Switzerland

- German: Unterer Grindelwaldgletscher
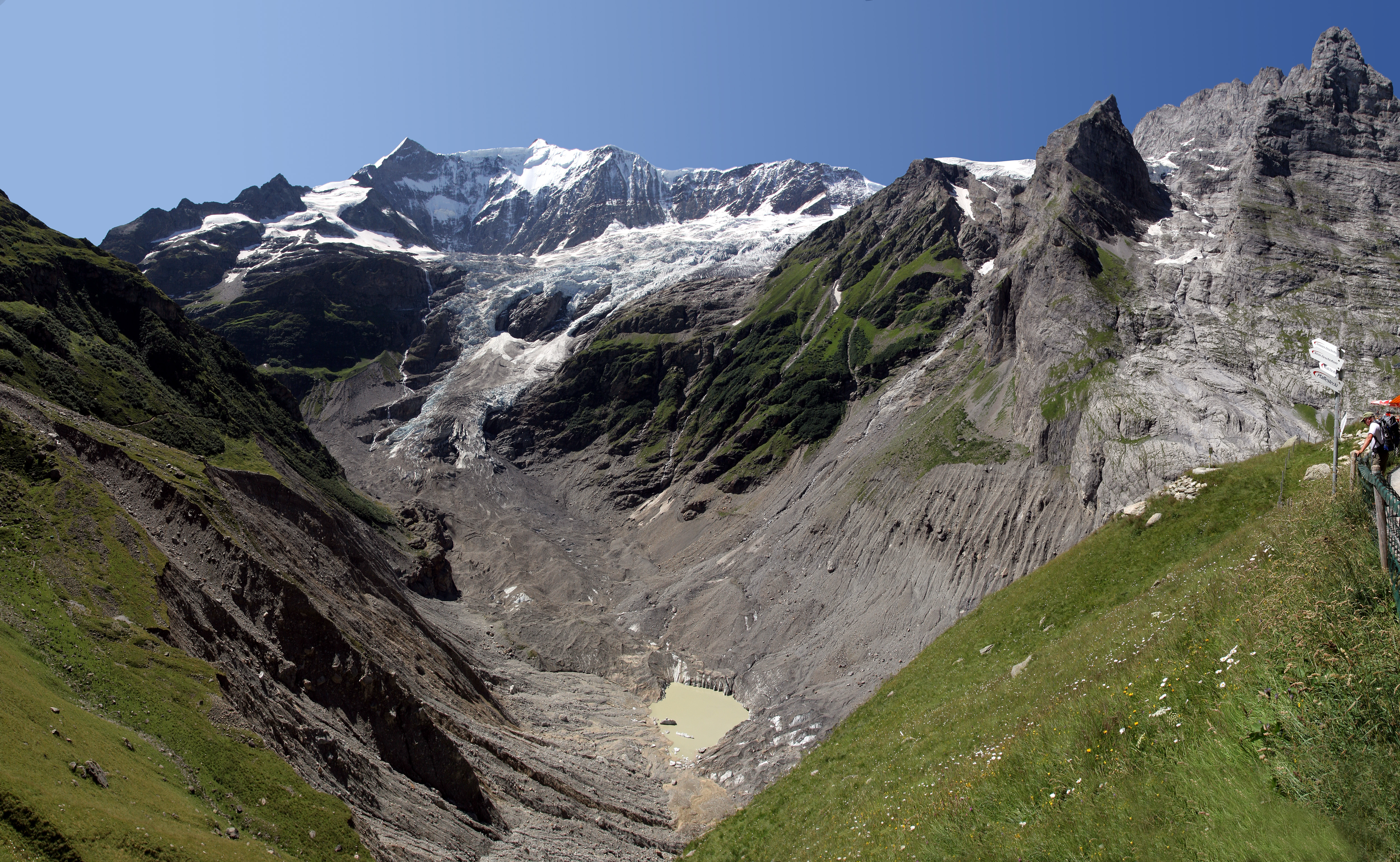
- Above the glacier lake the scrawny leftovers of the former much larger Lower Grindelwald Glacier (dark, polluted part) directly below of the blue-white Ischmeer (lit.: Ice Sea) and the Fiescherhörner (4,049 m (13,284 ft) a.s.l., The Horns of Fiesch). On the very right a nameless peak (2,251 m (7,385 ft)) and the Ostegg (2,709 m (8,888 ft), lit.: Eastern Corner), two peaks of the Hörnli, the eastern extension of the Eiger. On the left and above the glacier lake the green Bänisegg behind which the glacier's connection to its source used to be. View from Bäregg (1,772 m (5,814 ft), lit.: Bear's Corner). This valley used to be filled with ice as thick as up to 300 metres (980 ft) (picture from July 2009).

- Location within Switzerland Location within Alps
- Interactive map of Lower Grindelwald Glacier
- Type: Alpine
- Location: Canton of Bern, Switzerland
- Coordinates: 46°34′10″N 8°3′21″E
- Length: 6.2 km (3.9 mi)
- Highest elevation: 3,895 m (12,779 ft)
- Lowest elevation: 1,349 m (4,426 ft)
- Terminus: glacier lake (Weisse Lütschine (a tributary of the Schwarze Lütschine))
- Status: fast retreating

The Lower Grindelwald Glacier (German: Unterer Grindelwaldgletscher) is a glacier in the Swiss Bernese Alps, situated to the south-east of Grindelwald. It starts below the Agassizhorn and the Strahlegghörner and is connected with the Finsteraar Glacier via the Finsteraarjoch (3,390 m (11,120 ft)).

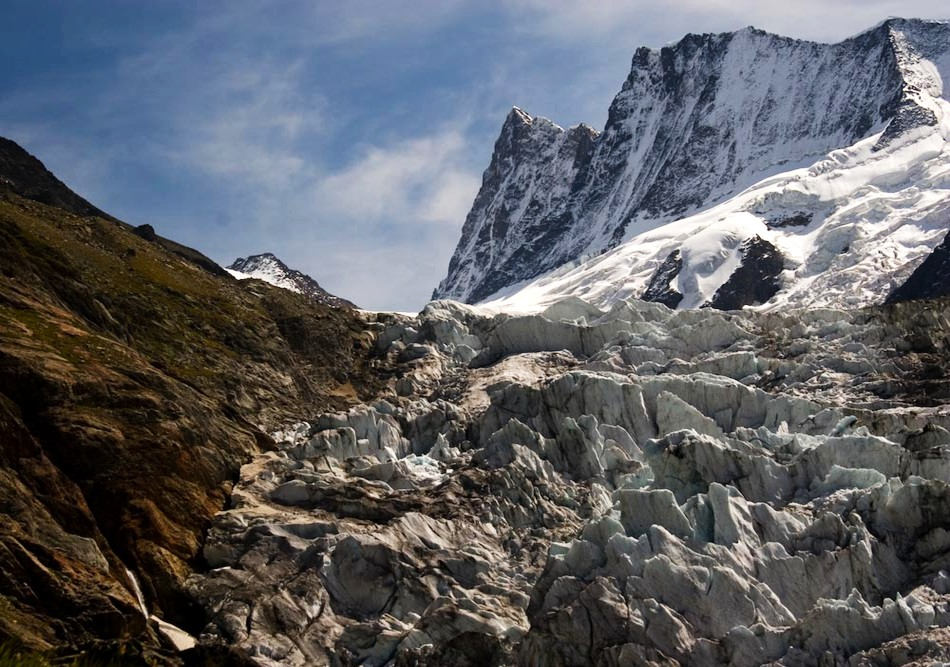
The top of the glacier below the Finsteraarhorn in the back and Agassizhorn to the right (August 2008)

The Lower Grindelwald Glacier yet has a major tributary, the Ischmeer (Swiss German for Ice Sea, formerly known as Grindelwald-Fiescher Glacier, German: Grindelwald-Fieschergletscher), which is the glacier overlooked by the Jungfrau Railway's Eismeer railway station.

The Lower Grindelwald Glacier was about 8.3 kilometres (5.2 mi) long and covered an area of 20.8 km^{2} (8.0 sq mi) in 1973. The glacier has significantly shrunk since, having a length of just 6.2 kilometres (3.9 mi) in 2015, with most of the retreat (1.9 km (1.2 mi)) happening since 2007.

In the middle of the 19th century it clearly reached into the valley of Grindelwald as far as Mettenberg at an altitude of 983 m (3,225 ft), an eastern quarter of Grindelwald, near the conjunction of the Schwarze and Weisse Lütschine. In 1900, it still reached as far as Rote Fluh (1,200 m (3,900 ft)) and filled the entire valley of its current end, the glacier lake, with a thickness of about 300 metres (980 ft) up to an altitude of 1,700 metres (5,600 ft), just below the current hiking path around the Bänisegg. Around 2000 it still reached into the gorge between the Hörnli (Eiger) and Mättenberg.

The Lower Grindelwald Glacier should not be confused with the Upper Grindelwald Glacier, situated to its north-east. The Grindelwald-Fiescher Glacier should not be confused with the like-named Fiescher Glacier, to the south of the Fiescherhorn.

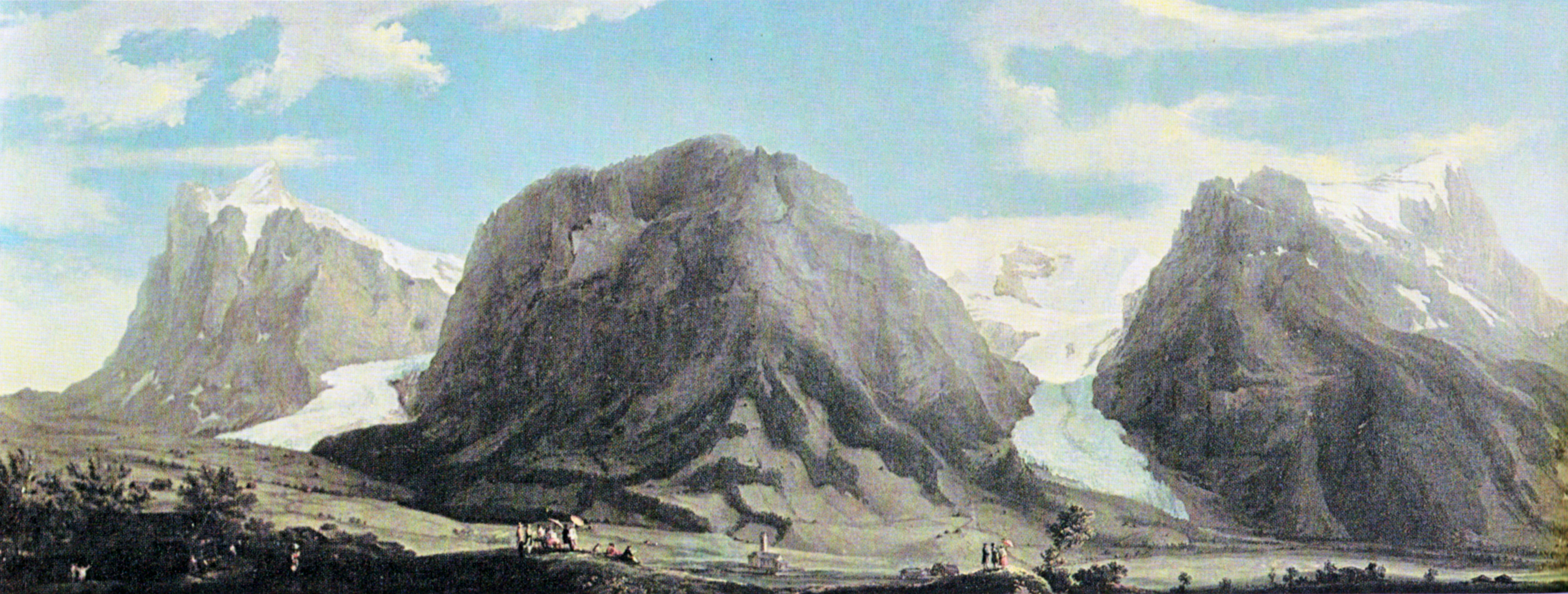
Upper (left) and Lower Grindelwald Glacier with Wetterhorn, Mättenberg, and Hörnli (north-eastern extension of the Eiger) from left to the right (1774, Caspar Wolf)

== See also ==
- List of glaciers in Switzerland
- List of glaciers
- Retreat of glaciers since 1850
- Swiss Alps
