= Wetterhorn =

Mountain in Switzerland

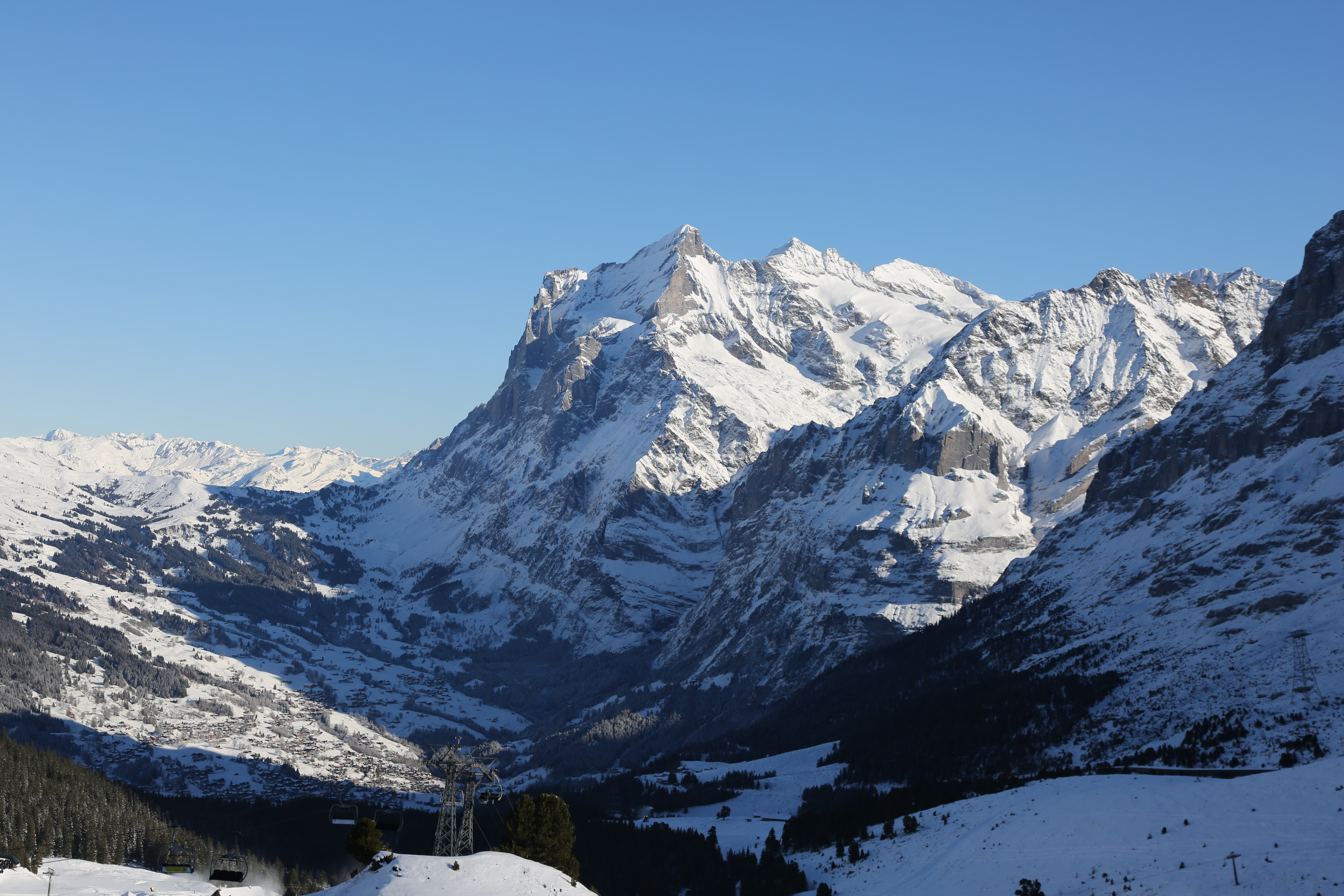
- Wetterhorn, Mittelhorn and Rosenhorn from Kleine Scheidegg

Highest point
- Elevation: 3,690 m (12,110 ft)
- Prominence: 211 m (692 ft)
- Parent peak: Mittelhorn
- Coordinates: 46°38′19.5″N 8°6′55.9″E

Geography
- Location within Switzerland
- Location: Bern, Switzerland
- Parent range: Bernese Alps

Climbing
- First ascent: 31 August 1844 by Melchior Bannholzer and Hans Jaun
- Easiest route: rock/snow/ice climb

The Wetterhorn (Swiss Standard German pronunciation: [ˈvɛtərˌhɔrn]; 3,690 m) is a peak in the Swiss Alps towering above the village of Grindelwald. Formerly known as Hasle Jungfrau, it is one of three summits on a mountain named the "Wetterhörner", the highest of which is the Mittelhorn (3,702 m) and the lowest and most distant the Rosenhorn (3,689 m). The latter peaks are mostly hidden from view from Grindelwald.

The Grosse Scheidegg Pass crosses the col to the north, between the Wetterhorn and the Schwarzhorn.

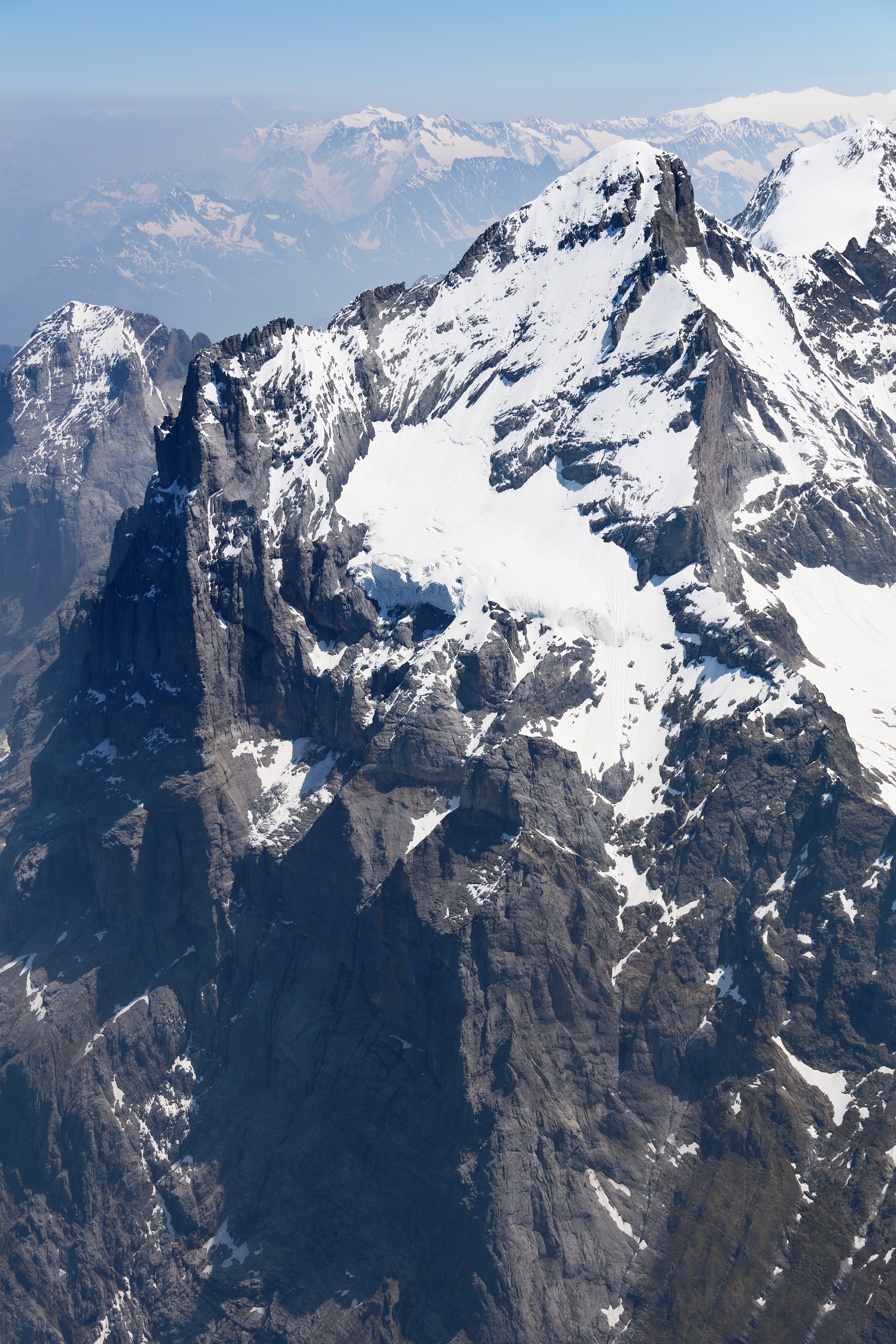
Aerial view from the southwest

== Ascents ==
The Wetterhorn summit was first reached on August 31, 1844, by the Grindelwald guides Hans Jaun and Melchior Bannholzer, three days after they had co-guided a large party organized by the geologist Édouard Desor to the first ascent of the Rosenhorn. The Mittelhorn was first summited on 9 July 1845 by the same guides, this time accompanied by a third, Kaspar Abplanalp, and by British climber Stanhope Templeman Speer. The son of a Scottish physician, Speer lived in Interlaken, Switzerland.

A September 1854 summit ascent by a party that included Alfred Wills, who apparently believed he had made the first ascent, was much celebrated in Great Britain. Wills' description of this trip in his book "Wanderings Among the High Alps" (published in 1856) helped make mountaineering fashionable in Britain and ushered in the so-called golden age of alpinism, the systematic exploration of the Alps by British mountaineers. Despite several by then well-documented earlier ascents and the fact that he was guided to the top, Willis was lauded in his 1912 obituary as "Certainly the first who can be said with any confidence to have stood upon the real highest peak of the Wetterhorn proper" (i.e. the 3,692 m summit) In a subsequent corrigendum, the editors admitted two earlier ascents, but considered his still "the first completely successful" one.

In 1866, Lucy Walker was the first documented woman to summit the peak.

The 24-year-old English mountaineer William Penhall and his Meiringen guide Andreas Maurer were killed by an avalanche high on the Wetterhorn on 3 August 1882.

The famed guide and Grindelwald native Christian Almer climbed the mountain many times in his life, including on his first of many trips with Meta Brevoort and her nephew W. A. B. Coolidge in 1868. His last ascent was in 1896 at the age of 74 together with his 75-year-old wife Margaritha ("Gritli") to celebrate their golden anniversary on the summit.

Winston Churchill climbed the Wetterhorn in 1894.

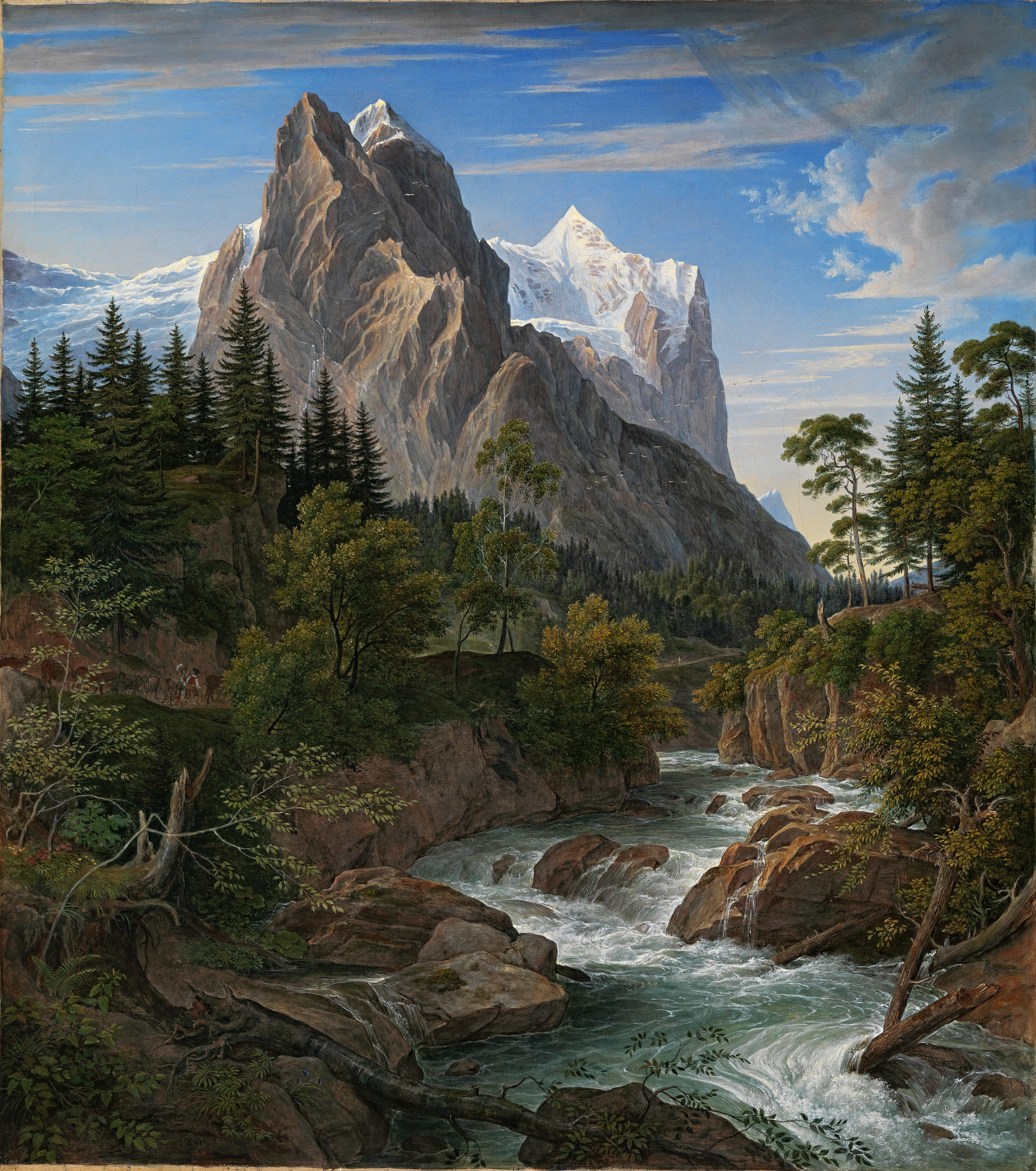
Joseph Anton Koch, The Wetterhorn with the Reichenbachtal, 1824

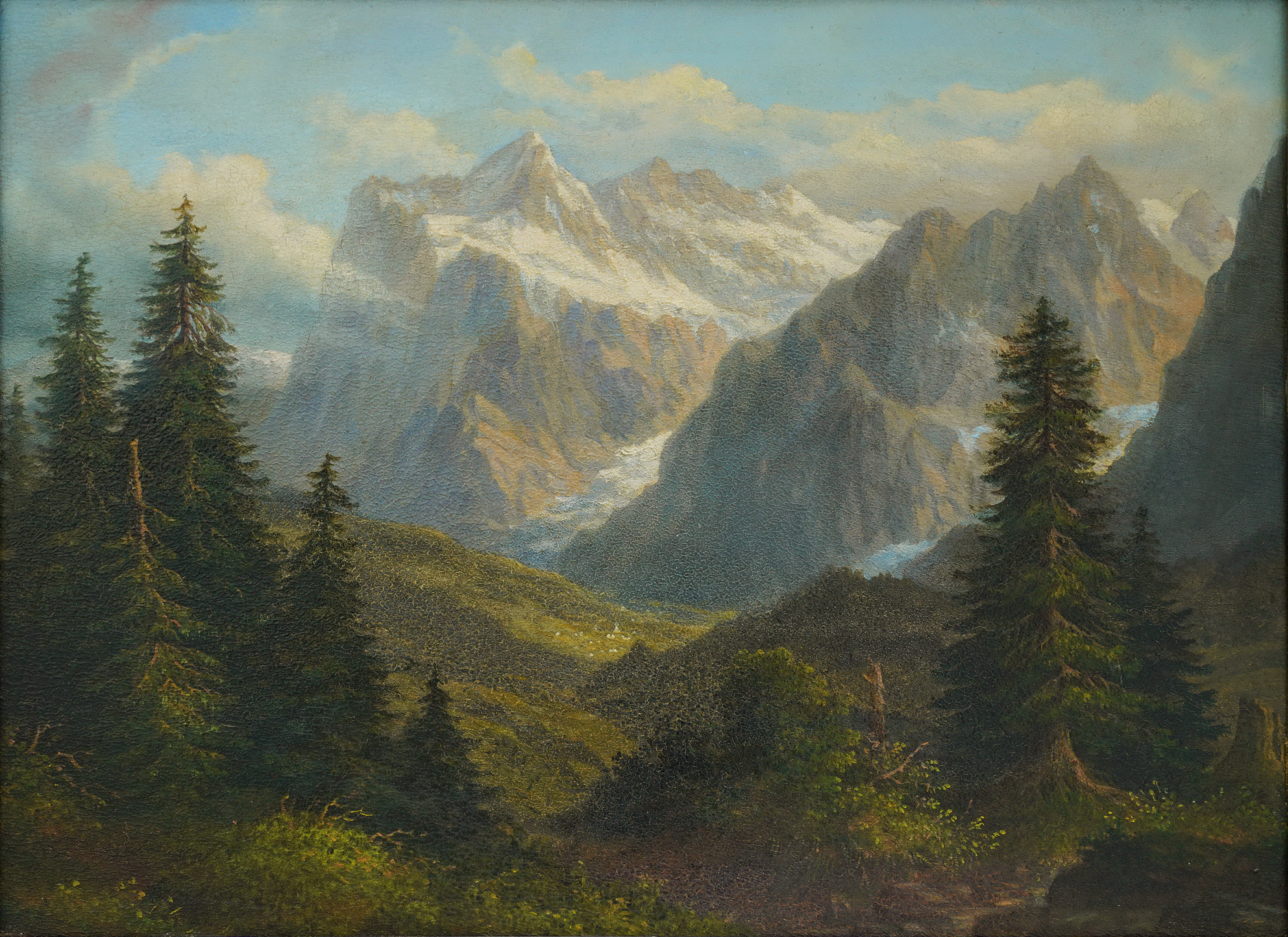
Heinrich Müller: Wetterhorn, Mettenberg, Upper and Lower Grindelwald Glacier from the west, c. 1870

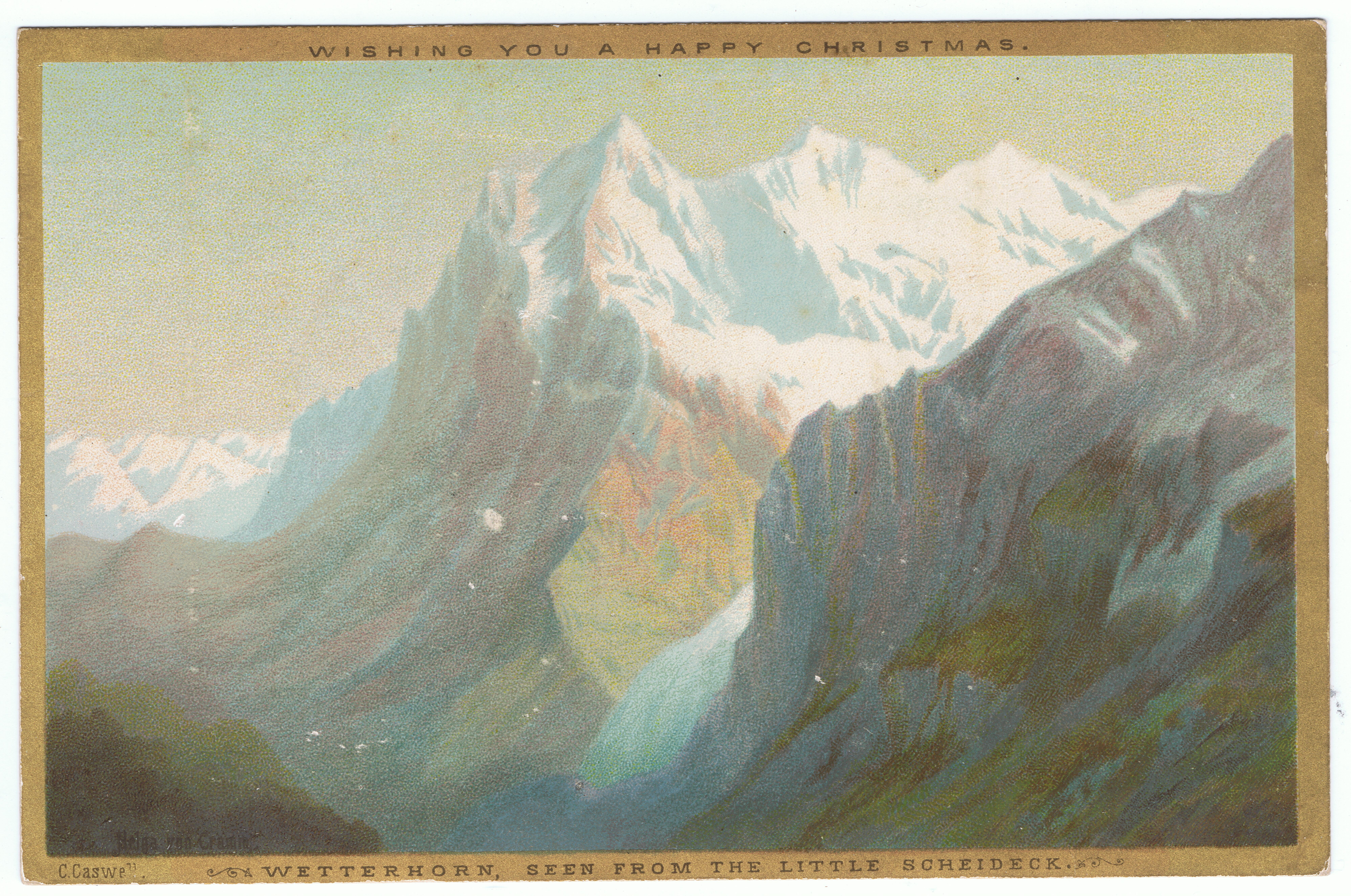
Chromolithograph Christmas card, of the Wetterhorn, seen from the Little Scheideck, by Helga von Cramm, c. 1880

== Aerial tramway ==
The Wetterhorn summit was the intended terminal for the world's first passenger-carrying aerial tramway, but only the first quarter was built. It was in operation until the beginning of World War I.
