= Mettenberg =

Mountain in Switzerland

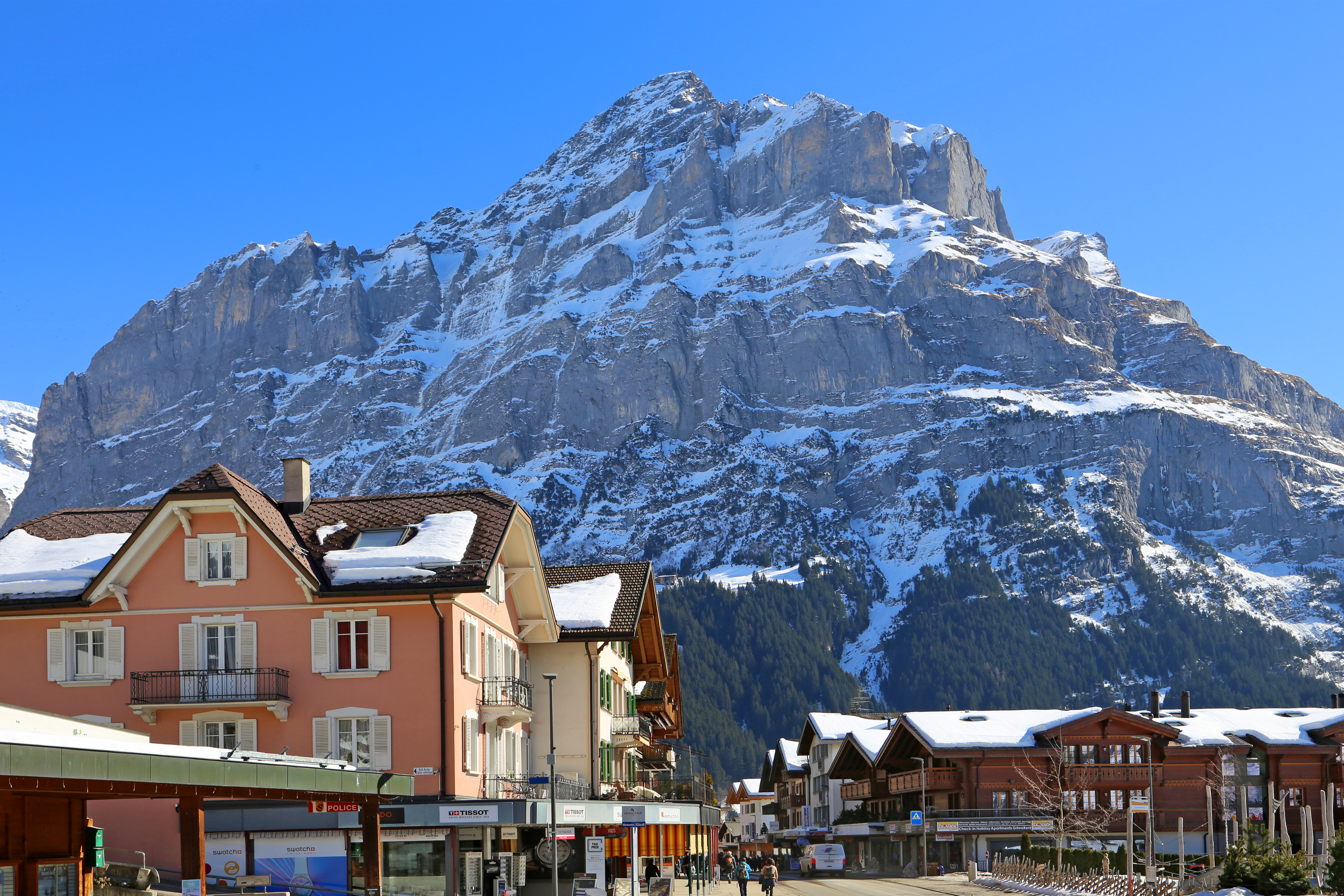
- The Mettenberg from Grindelwald Dorfstrasse. The station of Pfingstegg is visible between the forest and the cliffs.

Highest point
- Elevation: 3,104 m (10,184 ft)
- Prominence: 54 m (177 ft)
- Parent peak: Finsteraarhorn
- Coordinates: 46°36′30.7″N 8°4′44″E

Geography
- Location within Switzerland
- Location: Bern, Switzerland
- Parent range: Bernese Alps

The Mettenberg (also spelled Mättenberg) is a mountain of the Bernese Alps, overlooking Grindelwald in the Bernese Oberland. It lies north of the Schreckhorn and forms a huge buttress of the Schreckhorn range.

From Grindelwald, an aerial tramway goes as high as Pfingstegg (1,387 m), which is situated below the first cliffs of the mountain.
