= Upper Grindelwald Glacier =

Glacier in Switzerland

- Oberer Grindelwaldgletscher
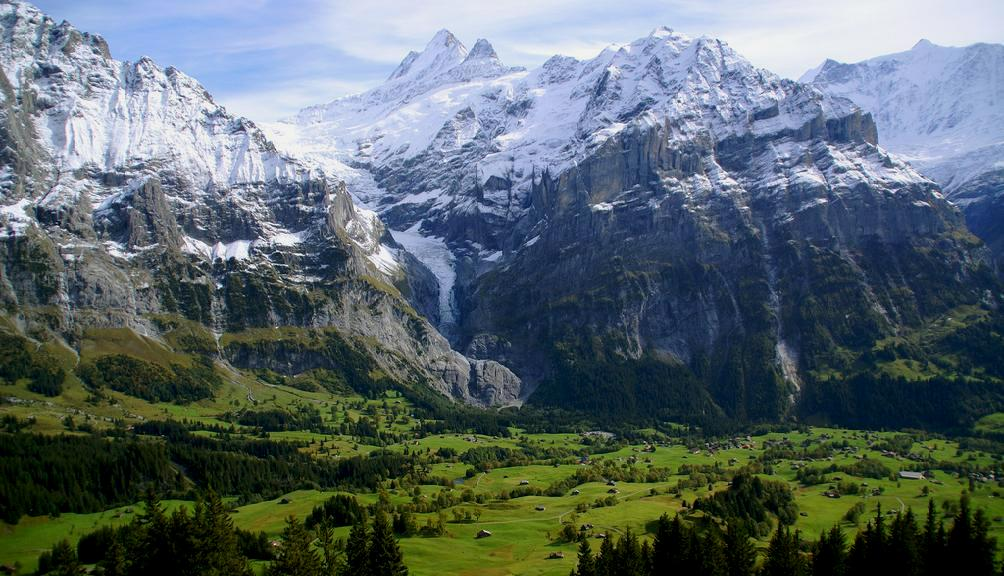
- Oberer Grindelwaldgletscher (center)

- Location within Switzerland Location within Alps
- Interactive map of Upper Grindelwald Glacier
- Location: Canton of Bern, Switzerland
- Coordinates: 46°36′48″N 8°6′26″E
- Length: 6 km (3.7 mi)

The Upper Grindelwald Glacier (German: Oberer Grindelwaldgletscher) is one of the two valley glaciers near Grindelwald on the northern side of the Bernese Alps, in the canton of Bern (the other being the Lower Grindelwald Glacier). It had a length of about 6.6 km (4.1 mi) and covered an area of 9.6 km^{2} (3.7 sq mi) in 1973.

The Upper Grindelwald Glacier arises from a vast snow field north of the Schreckhorn and south of the Wetterhorn. In 2008, the glacier tongue was around 1,400 metres (4,600 ft) above sea level, making it one of the lowest glaciers in the Alps.

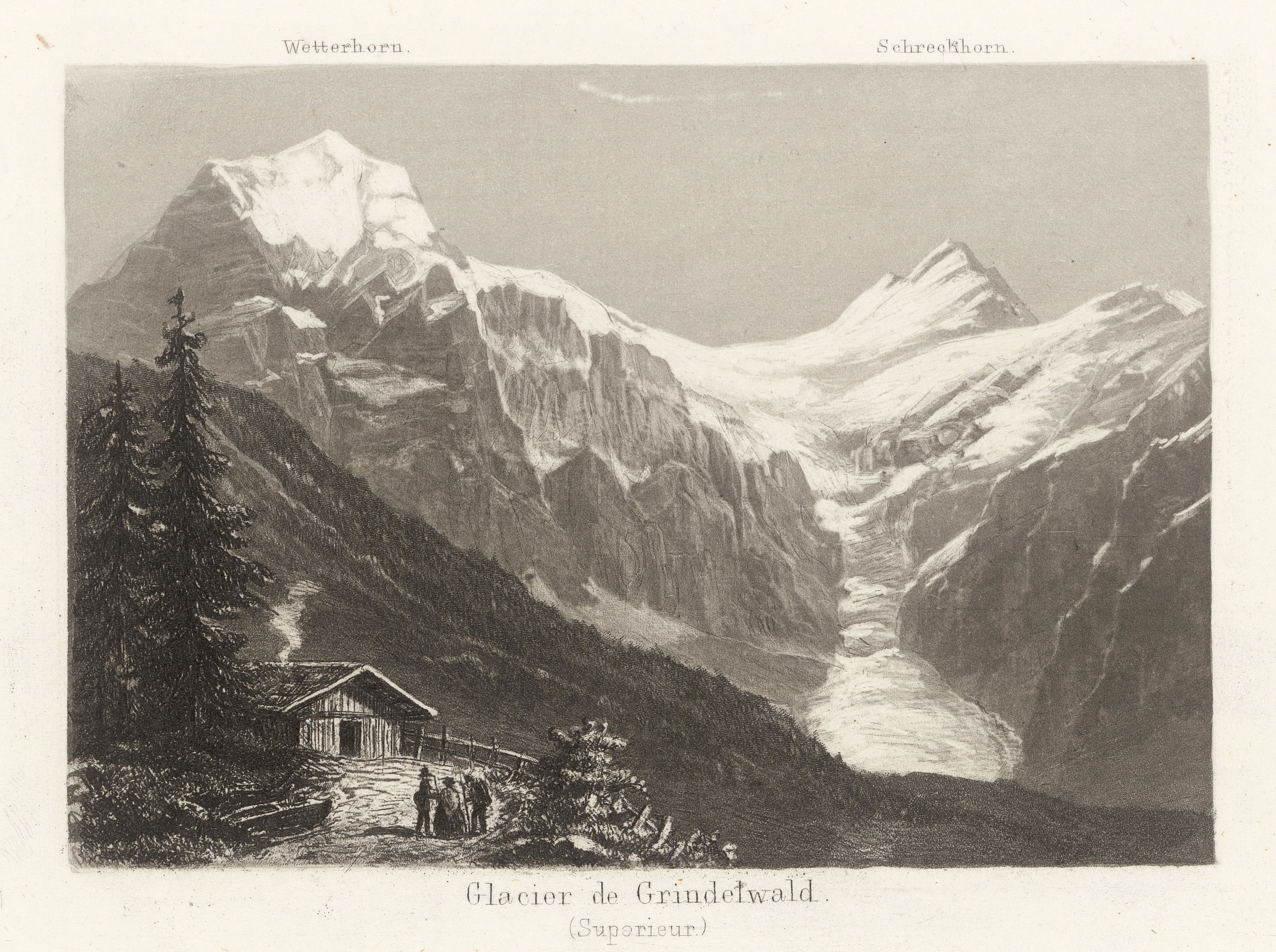
Upper Grindelwald Glacier c. 1870/80. Etching by Heinrich Müller

== See also ==
- List of glaciers in Switzerland
- List of glaciers
- Retreat of glaciers since 1850
- Swiss Alps
