= Grindelwald =

Municipality in Canton of Bern, Switzerland

- Municipality
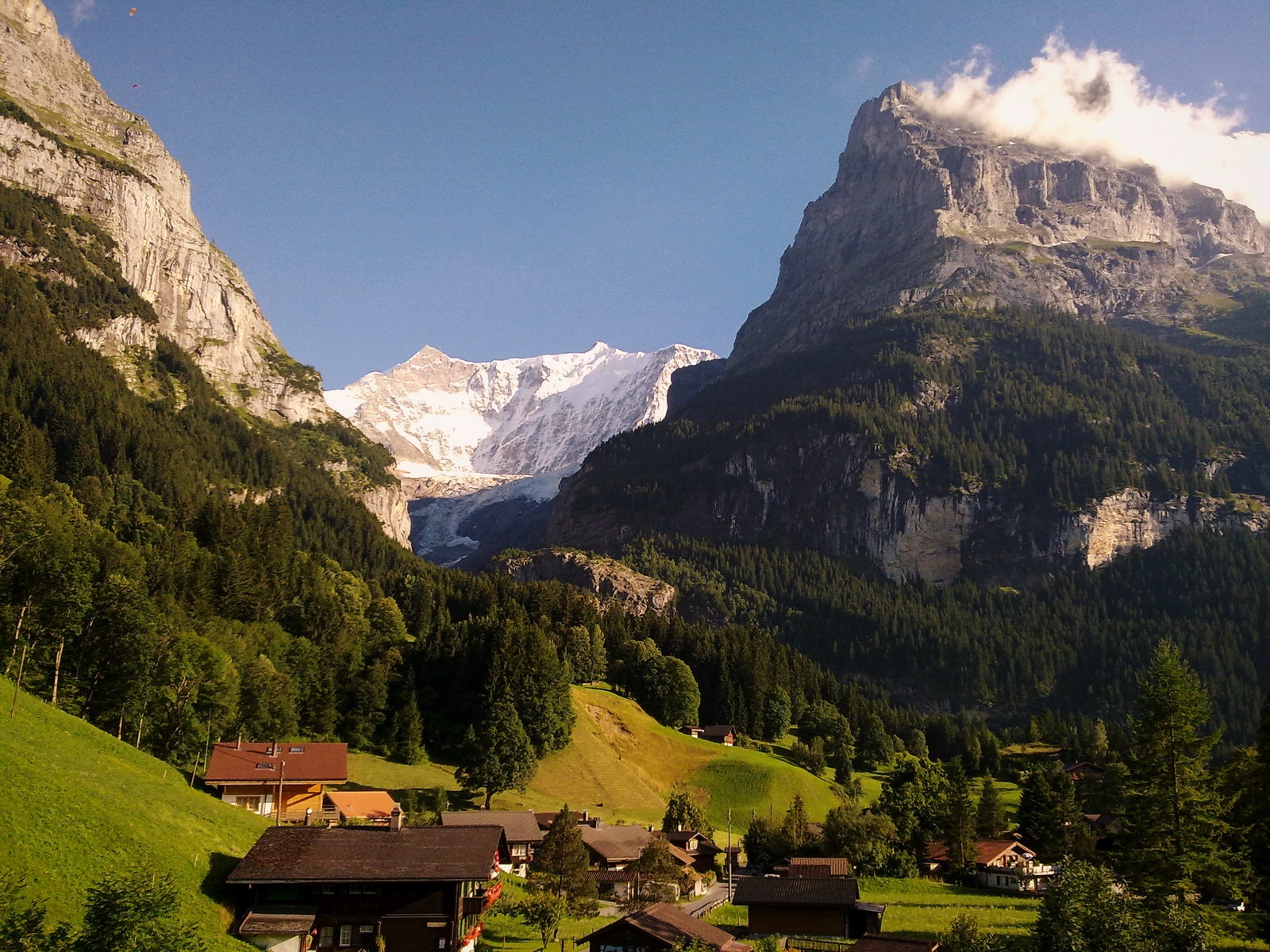
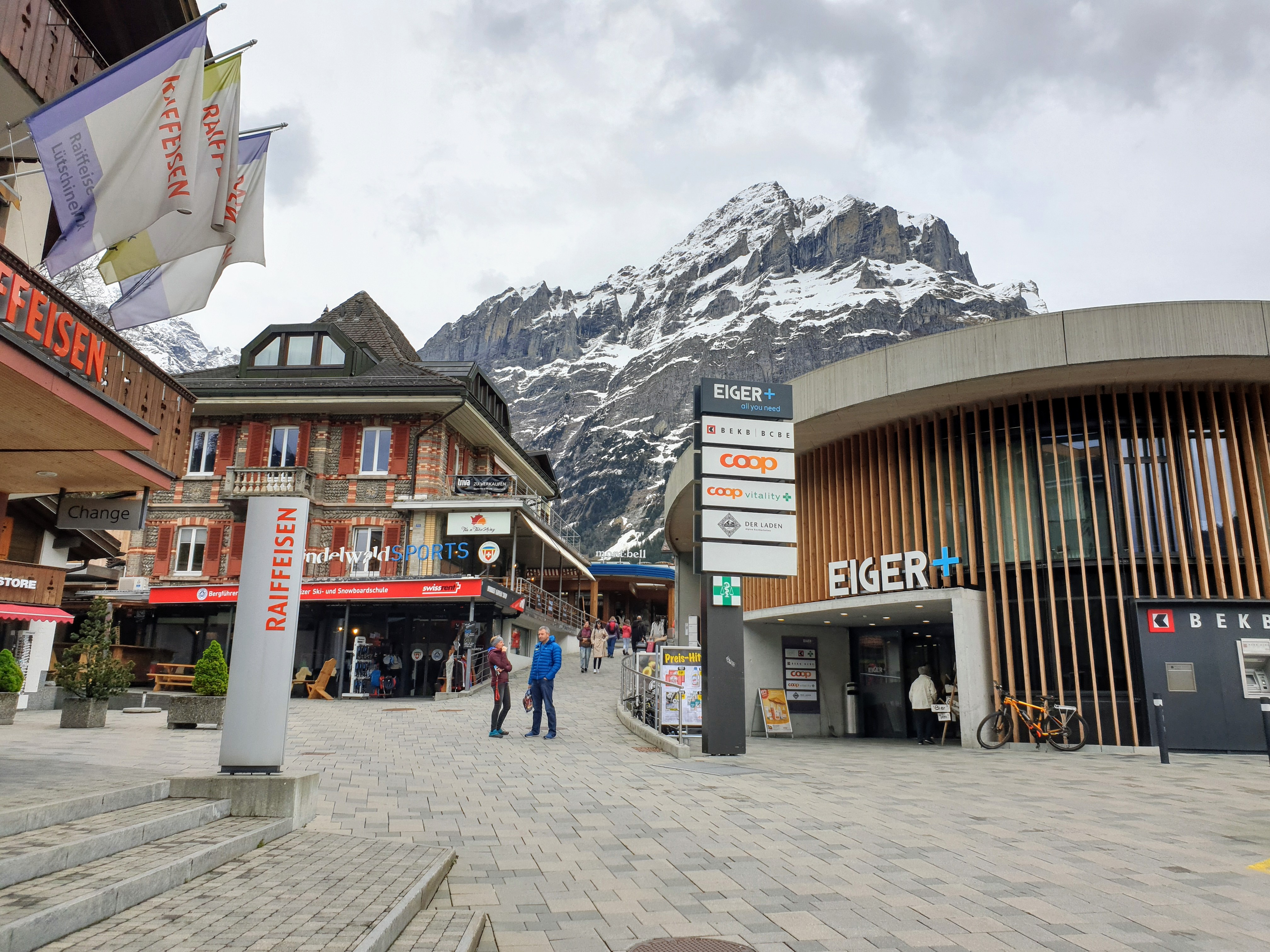
- View to southeast to the disappearing Lower Grindelwald Glacier with parts of the Mättenberg to the left, the Hörnli (2710 m a.s.l.) to the right, and the Fiescherhorn (4049 m a.s.l.) in the back Grindelwald center

- Flag Coat of arms
- Location of Grindelwald
- Location within Switzerland Location within Canton of Bern
- Coordinates: 46°37′N 8°02′E
- Country: Switzerland
- Canton: Bern
- District: Interlaken-Oberhasli

Government
  - Executive: Gemeinderat with 7 members
  - Mayor: Gemeindepräsident(in); Beat Bucher Ind. (as of 2026)

Area
  - Total: 171.3 km^{2} (66.1 sq mi)
- Elevation (Railway station Grindelwald): 1,034 m (3,392 ft)

Population (December 2020)
  - Total: 3,800
  - Density: 22/km^{2} (57/sq mi)
- Demonym: German: Grindelwaldner(in)
- Time zone: UTC+01:00 (CET)
  - Summer (DST): UTC+02:00 (CEST)
- Postal codes: 3818 Grindelwald, 3816 Burglauenen,
- SFOS number: 576
- ISO 3166 code: CH-BE
- Localities: Alpiglen, Burglauenen, Grund, Itramen, Isch, Mühlebach, Mettenberg, Schwendi, Tschingelberg, Wärgistal, Büössalp, Burg, Alp Grindel, First, Grosse Scheidegg, Pfingstegg
- Surrounded by: Brienz, Brienzwiler, Fieschertal (VS), Guttannen, Innertkirchen, Iseltwald, Lauterbrunnen, Lütschental, Meiringen, Schattenhalb
- Twin towns: Azumi, now Matsumoto (Japan)
- Website: www.gemeinde-grindelwald.ch

Grindelwald (Swiss Standard German pronunciation: [ˈɡrɪndl̩ˌvald]) is a village and municipality in the Interlaken-Oberhasli administrative district in the canton of Berne. In addition to the village of Grindelwald, the municipality also includes the settlements of Alpiglen, Burglauenen, Grund, Itramen, Mühlebach, Schwendi, Tschingelberg and Wargistal.

Grindelwald village is 1,034 m (3,392 ft) above sea level. Mentioned for the first time in 1146, it has become an important tourist destination of both Switzerland and the Alps since the golden age of alpinism in the 19th century. It is overlooked by a section of the Bernese Alps from the Wetterhorn to the Eiger, which creates a natural barrier. Together with the adjacent valley of Lauterbrunnen, the valley of Grindelwald forms part of the Jungfrau Region of the Bernese Oberland, between Interlaken and the main crest of the Bernese Alps.

Similarly to Lauterbrunnen, Grindelwald is connected to Interlaken by the Bernese Oberland Railway and is the start of the Wengernalp Railway, leading to Kleine Scheidegg. The latter resort is the start of the Jungfrau Railway, the highest railway in Europe and a gateway to the Jungfrau-Aletsch protected area.

== History ==
Grindelwald was first mentioned in 1146 as Grindelwalt. This designation is probably derived from the Old High German words "grintil" (bar, barrier) and "walt" (forest), thus describing the nature of the valley. According to a legend, the name Grindelwald comes from two monks of the Interlaken Monastery. After exploring the Lütschinen valleys, they are said to have reported about "Grinden" and "Wald", i.e. "stones" and "forests". This was initially the explanation for the origin of the name.

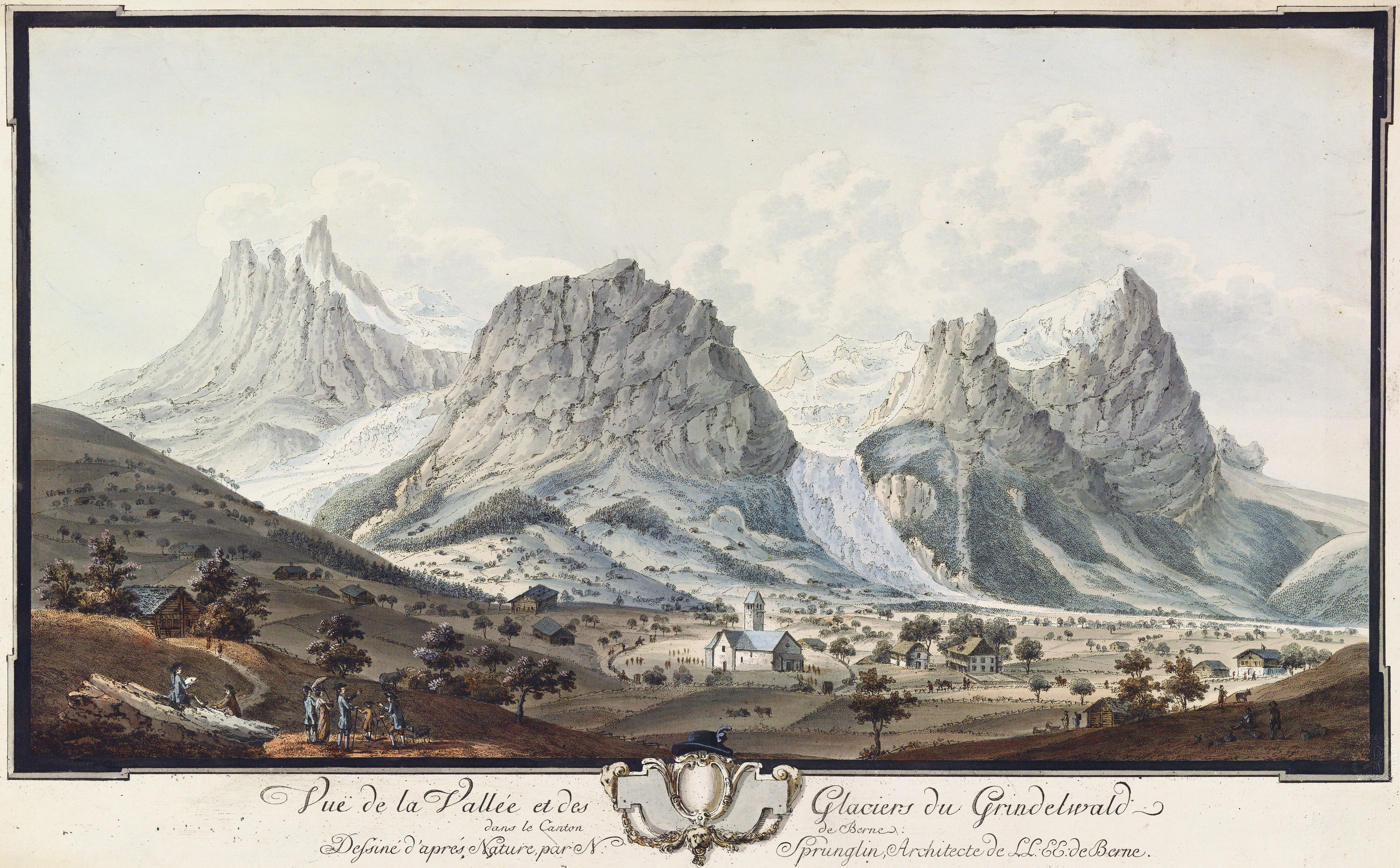
A depiction of Grindelwald in the 18th century by Niklaus Sprüngli

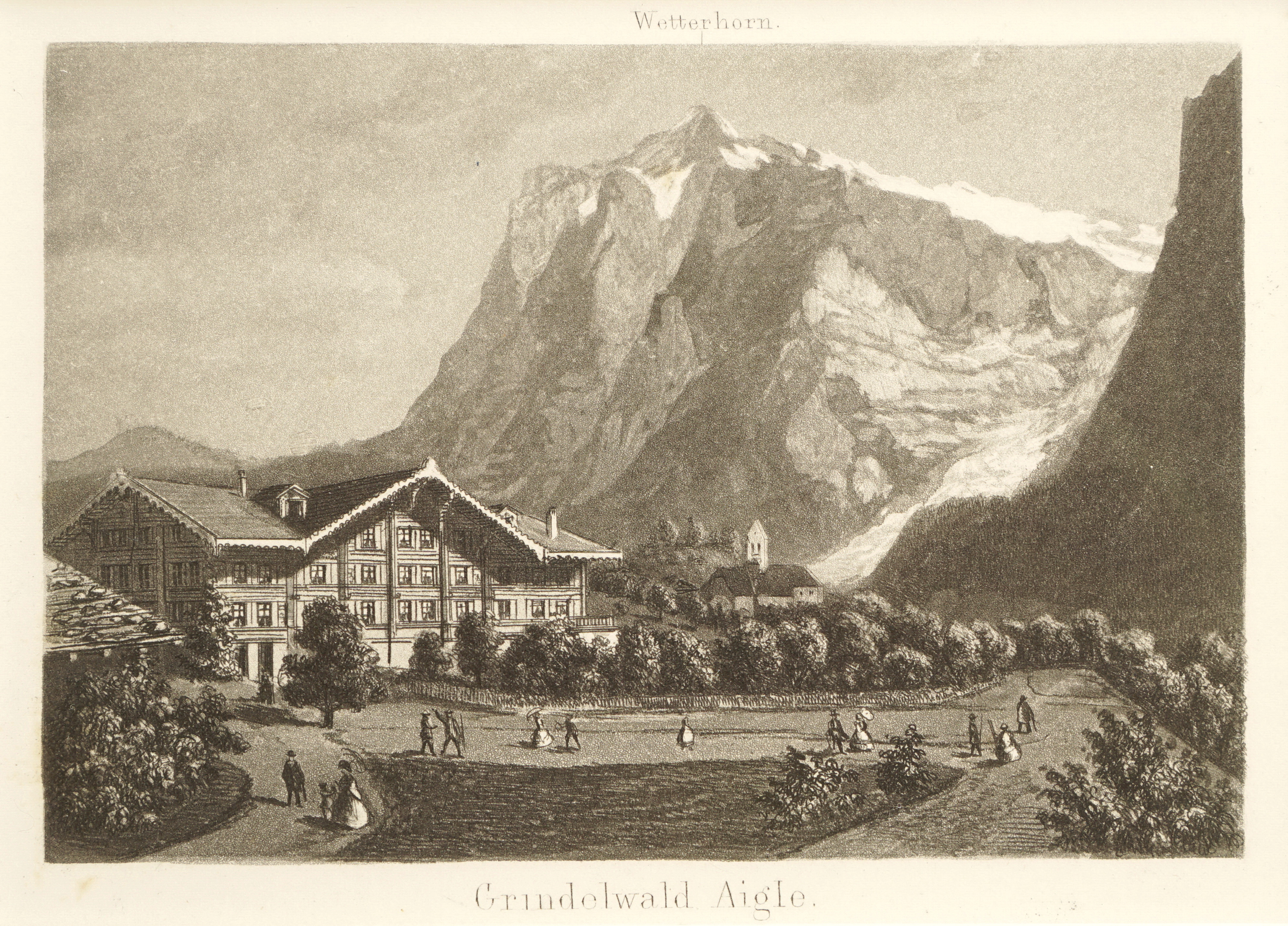
Grindelwald's first hotel, the "Black Eagle", with Wetterhorn and Upper Grindelwald Glacier, c. 1870. Etching by Heinrich Müller

The oldest traces of a settlement in the area are scattered neolithic tools which have been discovered around Grindelwald village. Several Roman era coins have also been found in the municipality. A castle was built on the Burgbühl hill above the village during the High Middle Ages.

In 1146, King Conrad III granted estates in Grindelwald to Interlaken Monastery. In the late 12th century, the barons of the alpine valleys in what became the Berner Oberland went to war against the expansionist Duke Berthold V of Zähringen. The Duke defeated a coalition of nobles in the Grindlewald valley in 1191. His victory allowed him to expand Zähringen power into Oberland, expand the city of Thun, and found the city of Bern. Beginning in the 13th century, Interlaken Monastery began to purchase rights and land in Grindelwald and eventually forced the local nobles out of the valley. The Monastery continued to exert influence in the village and in 1315 and again in 1332 ordered the villagers to raid Unterwalden to further the political ambitions of the Abbot's patrons. In response to the raids, in 1342, Unterwalden attacked Grindelwald. A few years later, in 1348–49, the villagers joined in an unsuccessful rebellion against ecclesiastical power. In 1528, the city of Bern adopted the Protestant Reformation and proceeded to spread the new faith in Grindelwald against the populations' wishes. Berne was able to impose its will, converted the village and secularized Interlaken Abbey and the Abbey's lands. Grindelwald became part of the bailiwick of Interlaken, under a Bernese bailiff.

The first village church was a wooden building from the mid-12th century. The wooden building was replaced with the stone St. Mary's Church in 1180. This church was replaced in the 16th century, and the present church was built in 1793. On August 18, 1892, a large part of the village was destroyed by a fire. That day, which followed a drought period, a violent foehn storm was raging. Within two hours, 116 buildings in the Grindelwald valley were destroyed and 412 residents became homeless.

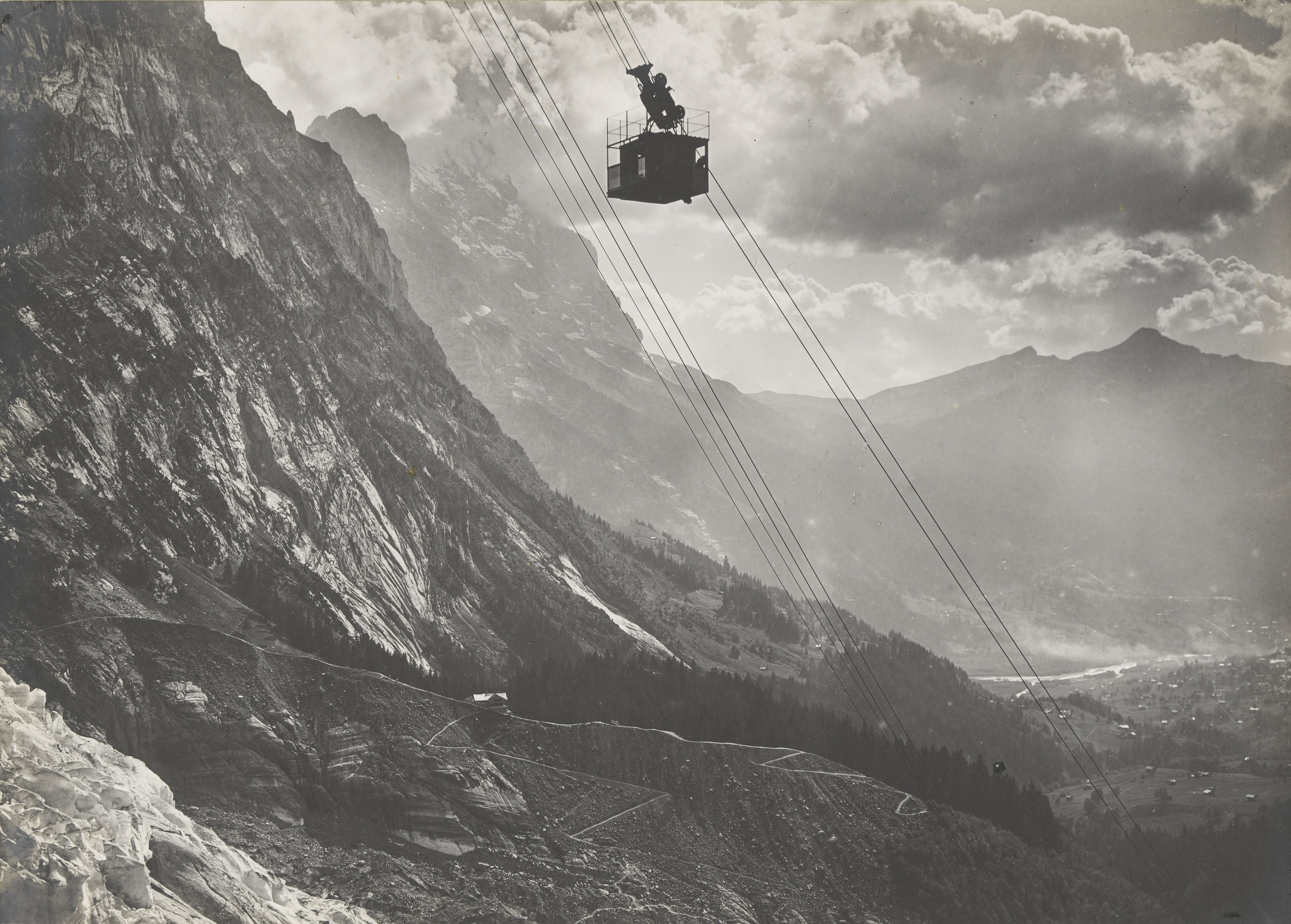
1909 view of the valley from the Wetterhorn Elevator

The tourism industry began in Grindelwald in the late 18th century as foreigners discovered the scenic town. Pictures of the vistas were widely reprinted, quickly making the village internationally famous. In the 19th century many Englishmen came to the village to climb the alpine peaks around the valley. The Finsteraarhorn (4,274 m [14,022 ft]), the Wetterhorn (3,692 m [12,113 ft]), the Eiger (3,967 m [13,015 ft]), the Schreckhorn (4,078 m [13,379 ft]) and the Gross Fiescherhorn (4,049 m [13,284 ft]) were all climbed during the 19th century, an ascent of the Wetterhorn marking the beginning of the golden age of alpinism. The ascent of the north face of the Eiger, in 1938, was also a milestone in mountaineering history.

The Grindelwald road was built in 1860–72, and the Bernese Oberland railway reached the village in 1890, both of which transformed an arduous journey into a simple trip and allowed tourists to flood into the village. In 1888, Grindelwald was the first resort in the Bernese Oberland to also become a winter destination, attractions being sleigh rides, curling, skating and, from 1891, skiing. The first resort opened in 1888, there were 10 hotels in 1889, and by 1914 there were 33 in Grindelwald. A rack railway was built to Kleine Scheidegg in 1893, and it was expanded to the Jungfraujoch in 1912. Numerous ski lifts, cable cars, hiking trails and alpine huts were built in the late 19th and 20th centuries to allow tourists to explore the mountains, notably the Wetterhorn Elevator, one of the first modern aerial tramways. Today, almost the entire economy of Grindelwald is based on tourism. The V-cableway, inaugurated in 2020, is the last major development in the valley.

The Grindelwald region has been the subject of scientific investigations, including in the "Alpine Studies" by the English alpinist W. A. B. Coolidge (1912) and in the Unesco research program Man and Biosphere of the Geographical Institute of the University of Bern on the effects of tourism (1979–1984).

== Flag and coat of arms ==
Grindelwald's current flag and coat of arms was introduced in 1994. The one the municipality had used before, dating from the 14th century, was the same as Austria's: three horizontal stripes of red-white-red.

The blazon of the new coat of arms is: Gules, on a bar argent a semi chamois rampant issuant sable between seven (4-3) mullets of the second.

== Geography ==
The municipality is quite large and is divided into seven mountain communities. However the municipality is dominated by the large tourist center of Grindelwald, slightly above the Black Lütschine, the main river of the valley, the latter converging with the White Lütschine. The village is surrounded by the mountains of the Faulhorn, Schwarzhorn, Wellhorn, Wetterhorn, Mettenberg, Schreckhorn, Lauteraarhorn, Agassizhorn, Fiescherhorn, Mönch (the highest), Eiger, Lauberhorn and Männlichen, all of which are either within or on the border of the municipality. The Kleine Scheidegg and the Grosse Scheidegg, respectively "minor watershed" and "major watershed" are the two main passes of the valley.

Grindelwald has an area of 171.33 km^{2} (66.15 sq mi). Of this area, 49.47 km^{2} (19.10 mi^{2}) or 28.9% is used for agricultural purposes, while 28.02 km^{2} (10.82 mi^{2}) or 16.4% is forested. Of the rest of the land, 3.06 km^{2} (1.18 mi^{2}) or 1.8% is settled (buildings or roads), 1.37 km^{2} (0.53 mi^{2}) or 0.8% is either rivers or lakes, and 89.21 km^{2} (34.44 mi^{2}) or 52.1% is unproductive land.

Of the built up area, housing and buildings made up 1.0% and transportation infrastructure made up 0.6%. Out of the forested land, 12.9% of the total land area is heavily forested, and 2.3% is covered with orchards or small clusters of trees. Of the agricultural land, 5.1% is pastures and 23.8% is used for alpine pastures. All the water in the municipality is flowing water. Of the unproductive areas, 6.6% is unproductive vegetation, 24.0% is too rocky for vegetation, and 21.6% of the land is covered by glaciers.

The highest peaks of the valley, from the Wellhorn and Wetterhorn to the Eiger and Mönch, are part of the Jungfrau-Aletsch protected area, a world heritage site.

On 31 December 2009, Amtsbezirk Interlaken, the municipality's former district, was dissolved. On the following day, 1 January 2010, it joined the newly created Verwaltungskreis Interlaken-Oberhasli.

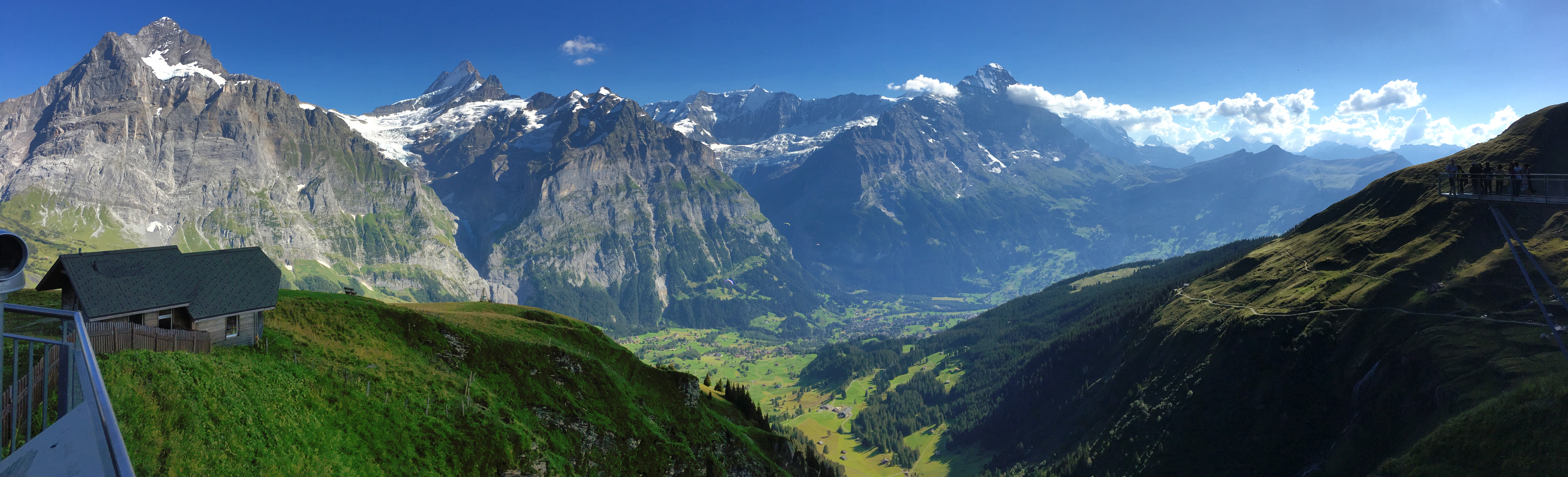
The valley of Grindewald from First, with the major peaks (from left to right) of Wetterhorn, Schreckhorn, Gross Fiescherhorn and Eiger. Grindelwald is visible on the center right.

== Demographics ==
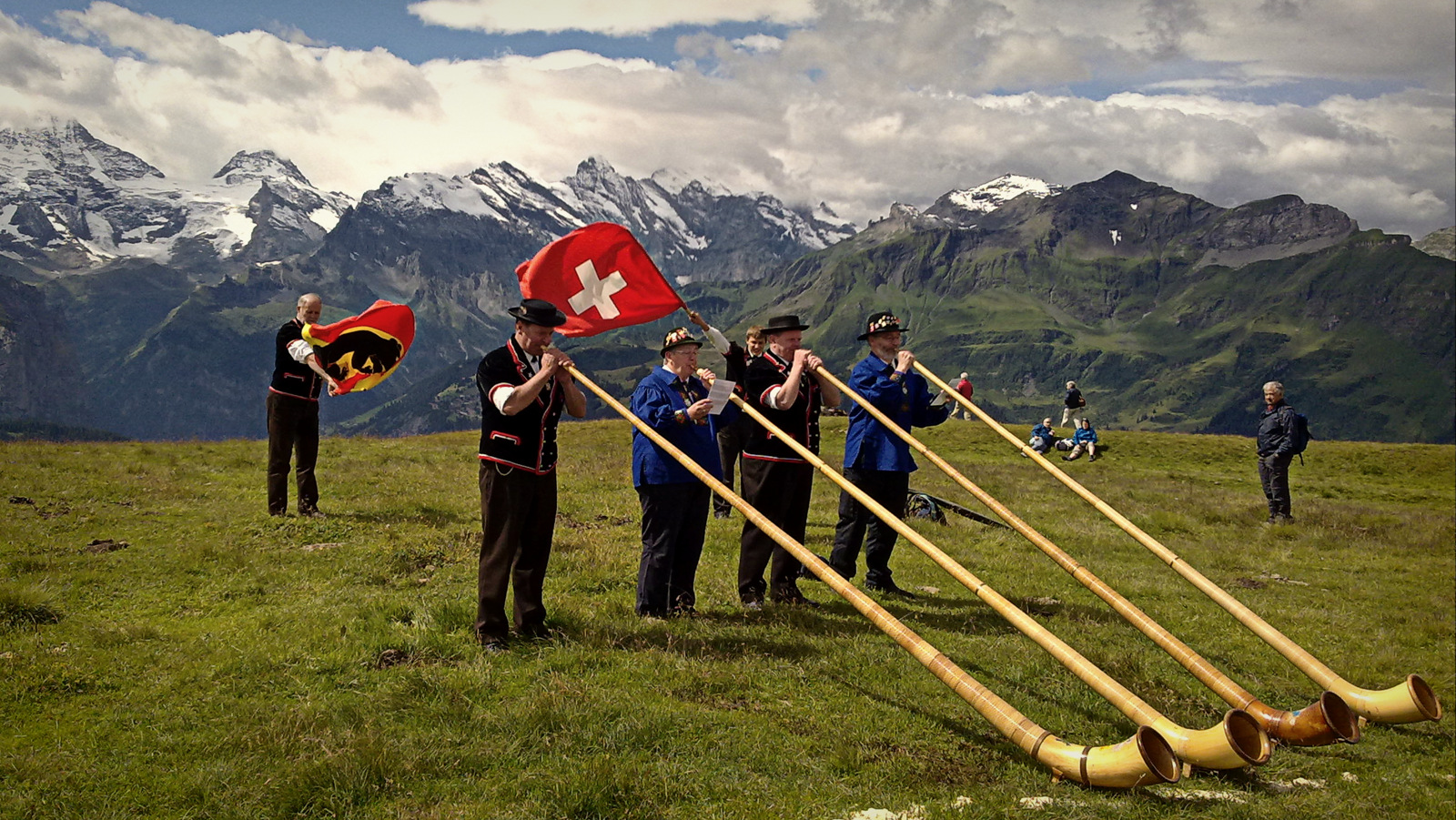
Alphorn Festival in Grindelwald area

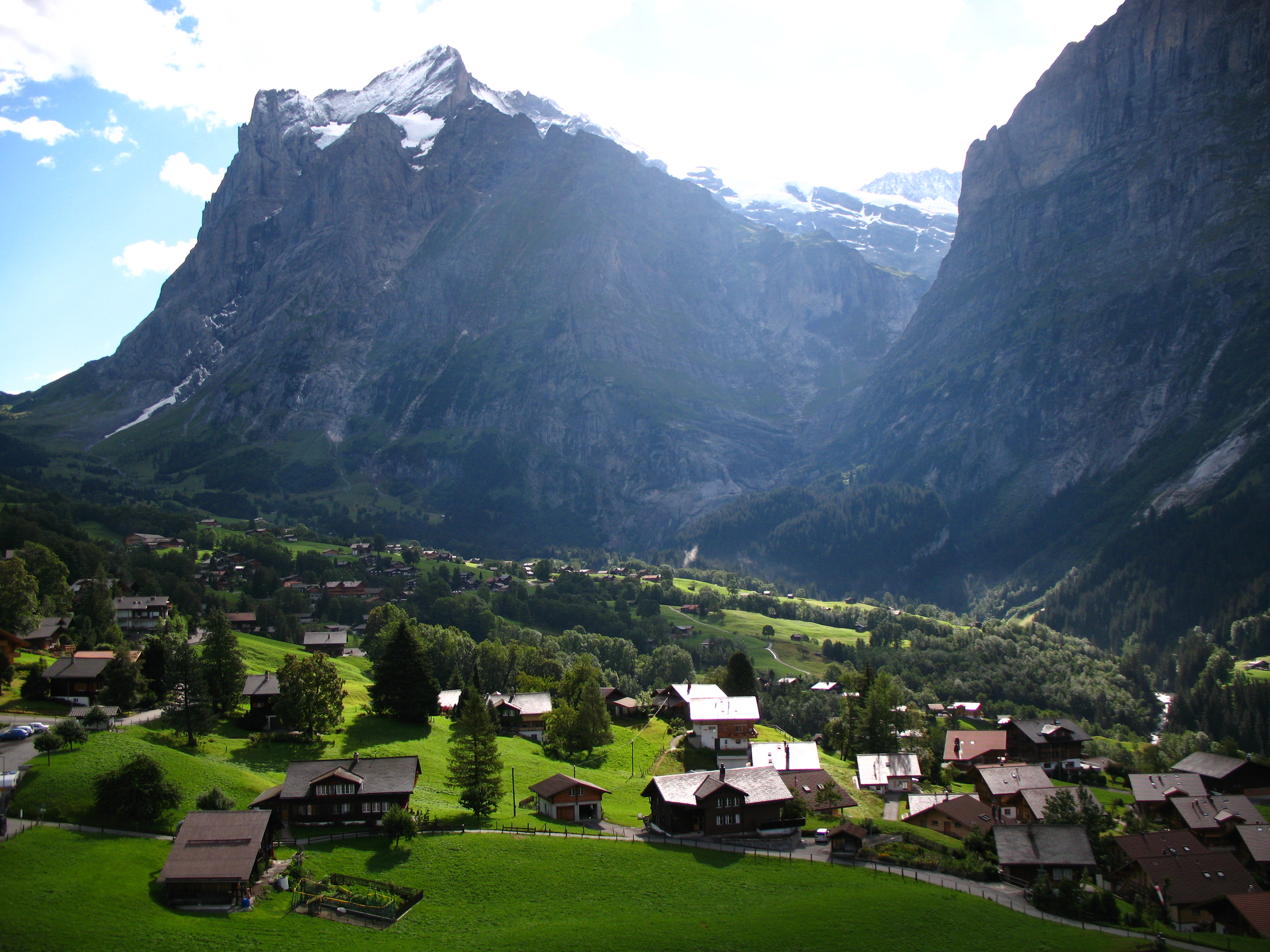
Typically dispersed chalets with the Wetterhorn in background

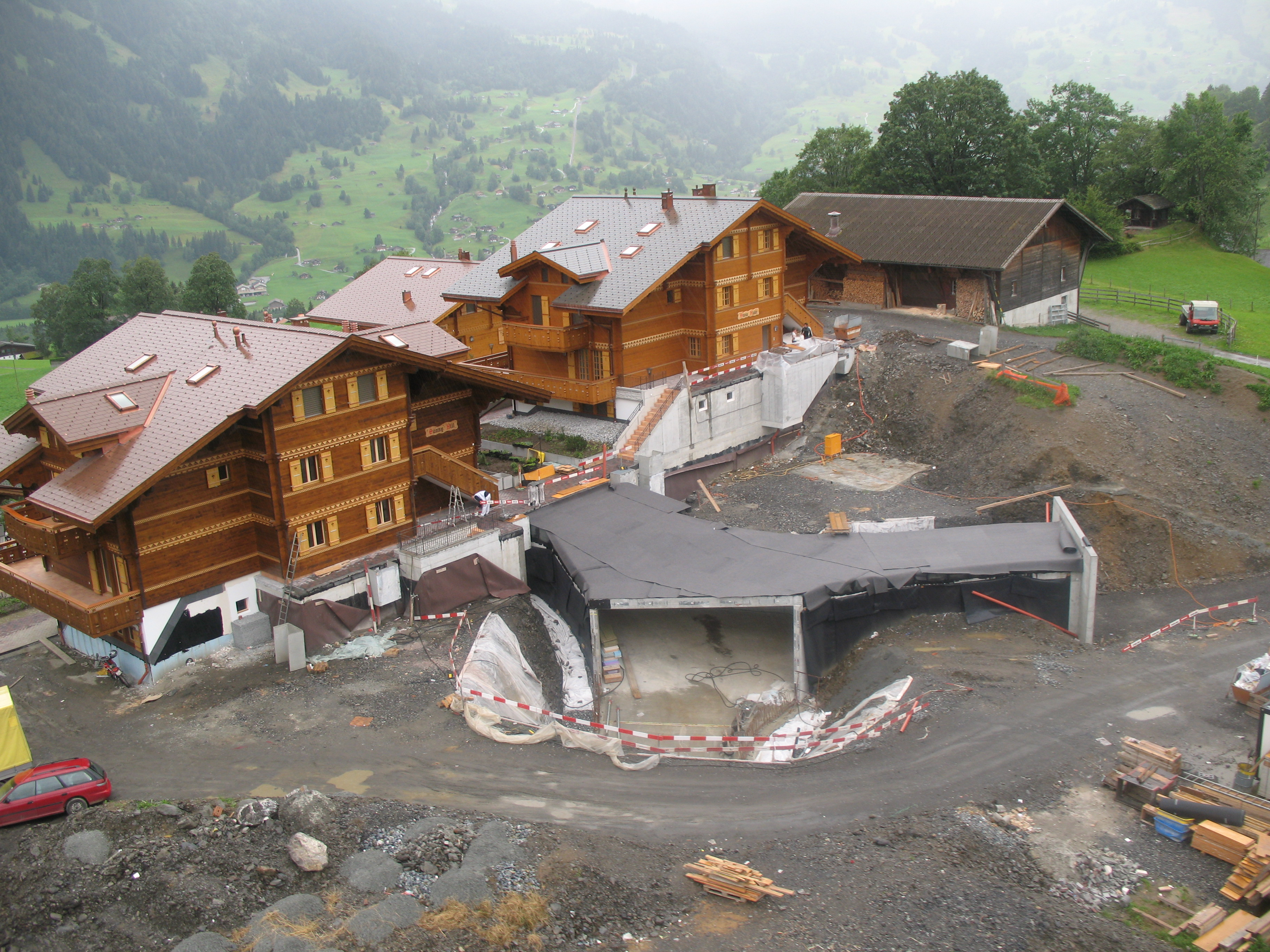
New houses with buried garages under construction in Grindelwald

Grindelwald has a population (as of December 2020) of 3,800. As of 2010, 18.0% of the population are resident foreign nationals. In the period from 2000 to 2010, the population changed at a rate of −1.3%. Migration accounted for 0.2%, while births and deaths accounted for −1.7%.

Most of the population (as of 2000) spoke German (3,531 or 86.8%) as their first language, Portuguese is the second most common (183 or 4.5%) and French was the third (69 or 1.7%). There were 60 people who speak Italian and four people who spoke Romansh.

As of 2008, the population was 50.1% male and 49.9% female. The population was made up of 1,556 Swiss men (40.9% of the population) and 354 (9.3%) non-Swiss men. There were 1,568 Swiss women (41.2%) and 331 (8.7%) non-Swiss women. Of the population in the municipality, 1,846 or about 45.4% were born in Grindelwald and lived there in 2000. There were 847 or 20.8% who were born in the same canton, while 510 or 12.5% were born somewhere else in Switzerland, and 679 or 16.7% were born outside of Switzerland.

As of 2010, children and teenagers (0–19 years old) made up 17.5% of the population, while adults (20–64 years old) made up 62.5% and seniors (over 64 years old) make up 20%.

As of 2000, there were 1,750 people who were single and never married in the municipality. There were 1,971 married individuals, 221 widows or widowers and 127 individuals who were divorced.

As of 2000, there were 679 households that consisted of only one person and 82 households with five or more people. In 2000, a total of 1,581 apartments (44.9% of the total) were permanently occupied, while 1,750 apartments (49.6%) were seasonally occupied and 194 apartments (5.5%) were empty. As of 2010, the construction rate of new housing units was 13.1 new units per 1000 residents.

The historical population is given in the following chart:

== Heritage sites of national significance ==
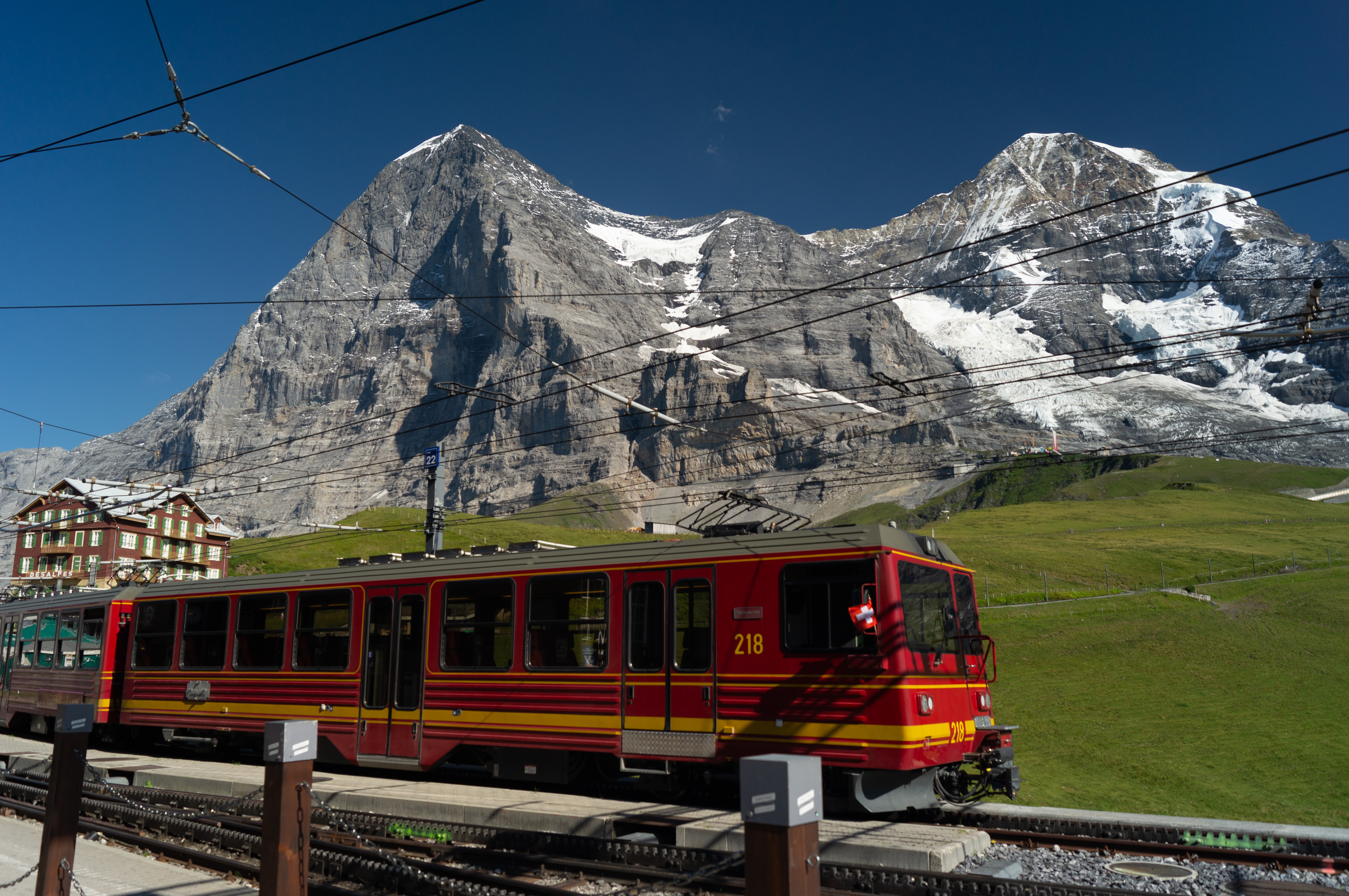
Jungfraubahn at Kleine Scheidegg with the Eiger and Mönch

The Jungfraubahn, a mountain railway up the Jungfrau mountain, is listed as a Swiss heritage site of national significance. The land around the Kleine Scheidegg is part of the Inventory of Swiss Heritage Sites. Both Jungfraubahn and Kleine Scheidegg are shared between the municipalities of Grindelwald and Lauterbrunnen.

== Politics ==
In the 2011 federal election, the most popular party was the Swiss People's Party (SVP) which received 54.2% of the vote. The next three most popular parties were the Conservative Democratic Party (BDP) (14.8%), the FDP.The Liberals (8.8%) and the Green Party (6.9%). In the federal election, a total of 1,194 votes were cast, and the voter turnout was 44.4%.

== Economy ==
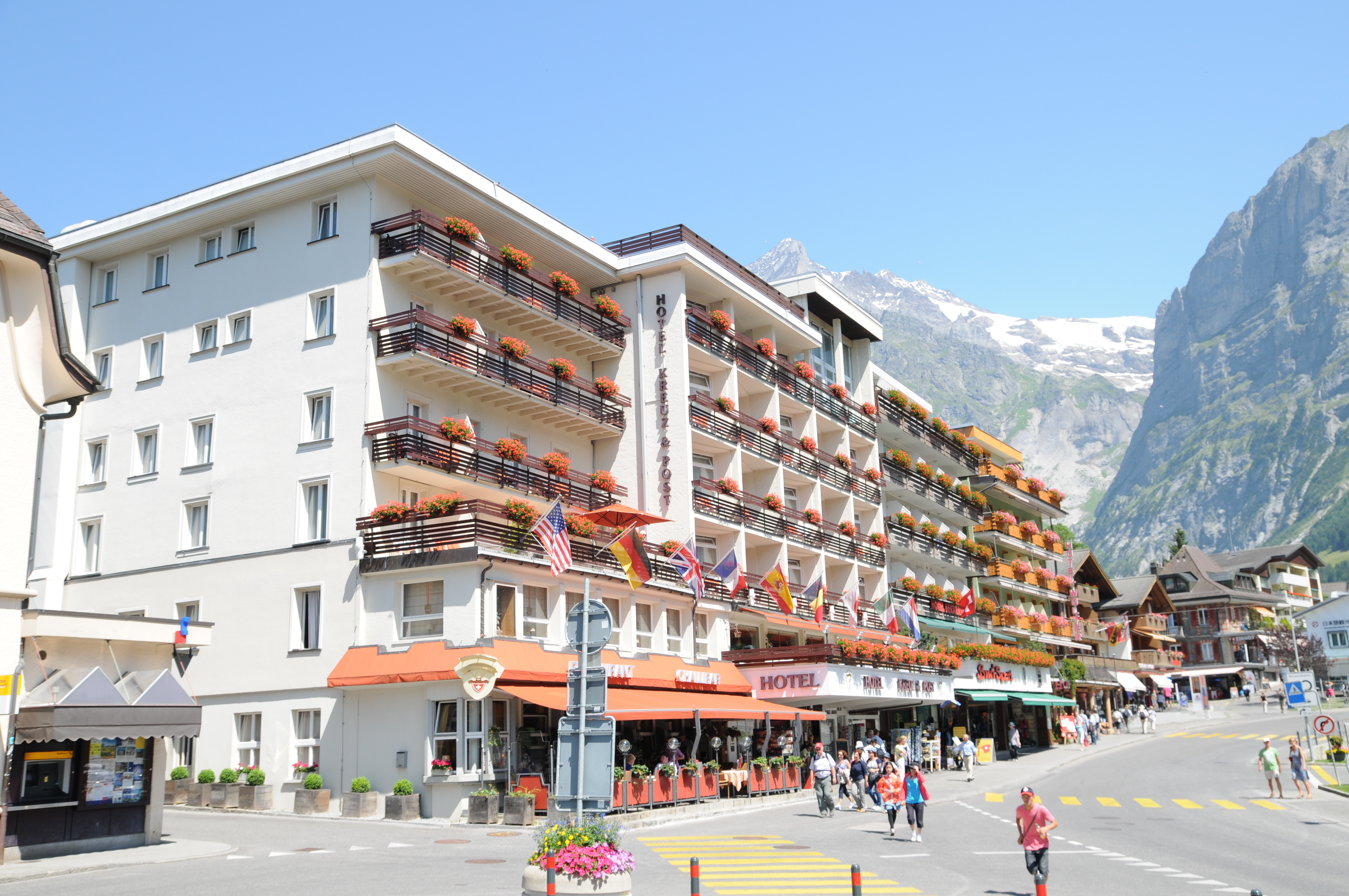
Hotels on the Dorfstrasse. The local economy mostly depends on tourism.

The principal commercial artery of Grindelwald is the Dorfstrasse, which is the prolongation of the Grindelwaldstrasse, the main access road of the village.

As of 2011, Grindelwald had an unemployment rate of 1.48%. As of 2008, there were a total of 2,714 people employed in the municipality. Of these, there were 334 people employed in the primary economic sector and about 130 businesses involved in this sector. 393 people were employed in the secondary sector, and there were 51 businesses in this sector. 1,987 people were employed in the tertiary sector, with 229 businesses in this sector. There were 2,403 residents of the municipality who were employed in some capacity, of which females made up 45.4% of the workforce.

In 2008 there were a total of 2,265 full-time equivalent jobs. The number of jobs in the primary sector was 165, of which 159 were in agriculture and seven were in forestry or lumber production. The number of jobs in the secondary sector was 365, of which 42 or (11.5%) were in manufacturing, six or (1.6%) were in mining and 292 (80.0%) were in construction. The number of jobs in the tertiary sector was 1,735. In the tertiary sector; 241 or 13.9% were in wholesale or retail sales or the repair of motor vehicles, 193 or 11.1% were in the movement and storage of goods, 1,022 or 58.9% were in a hotel or restaurant, 27 or 1.6% were the insurance or financial industry, 45 or 2.6% were technical professionals or scientists, 46 or 2.7% were in education and 58 or 3.3% were in health care.

In 2000, there were 432 workers who commuted into the municipality and 265 workers who commuted away. The municipality is a net importer of workers, with about 1.6 workers entering the municipality for every one leaving. Of the working population, 9.2% used public transportation to get to work, and 36.2% used a private car.

== Religion ==
From the 2000 census, 690 or 17.0% were Catholic, while 2,874 or 70.6% belonged to the Swiss Reformed Church. Of the rest of the population, there were 31 members of an Orthodox church (or about 0.76% of the population), there were two individuals (or about 0.05% of the population) who belonged to the Christian Catholic Church, and there were 105 individuals (or about 2.58% of the population) who belonged to another Christian church. There was one individual who was Jewish, and 32 (or about 0.79% of the population) who were Muslim. There were 14 individuals who were Buddhist and one individual who belonged to another church. One hundred forty-four (or about 3.54% of the population) belonged to no church, were agnostic or atheist, and 227 individuals (or about 5.58% of the population) did not answer the question.

== Climate ==
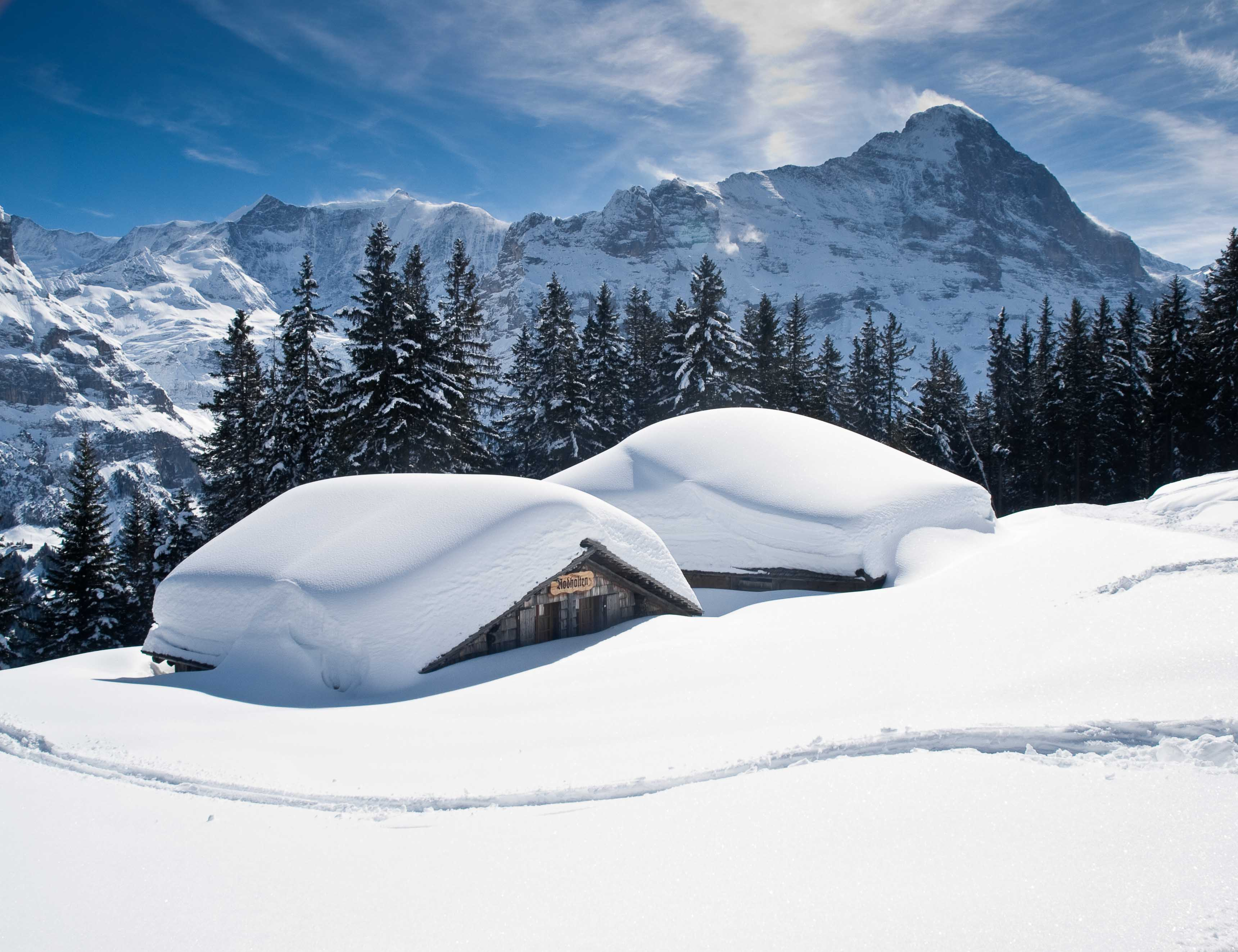
Winter in Grindelwald

Between 1981 and 2010, Grindelwald had an average of 145.4 days of rain or snow per year and on average received 1,450 mm (57 in) of precipitation. The wettest month was August during which time Grindelwald received an average of 165 mm (6.5 in) of rain or snow. During this month there was precipitation for an average of 14.4 days. The month with the most days of precipitation was June, with an average of 14.8, but with only 151 mm (5.9 in) of rain or snow. The driest month of the year was February with an average of 89 mm (3.5 in) of precipitation over 9.7 days.

As the municipality territory stretches from Lütschental (approx. 730 metres (2,400 ft) above sea level) to the summit of the Mönch (4,110 metres (13,480 ft)), huge differences in average temperature are naturally found. The Montane zone and the Subalpine zone extend from the bottom of the valley to the tree line, at approx. 2,000 metres (6,600 ft). There, coniferous trees and snowfall progressively replace deciduous tree and rainfall. Above that is the Alpine zone, consisting of Alpine tundra. The last region, above 3,000 metres (9,800 ft), is the Ice cap climate zone.

== Transport ==
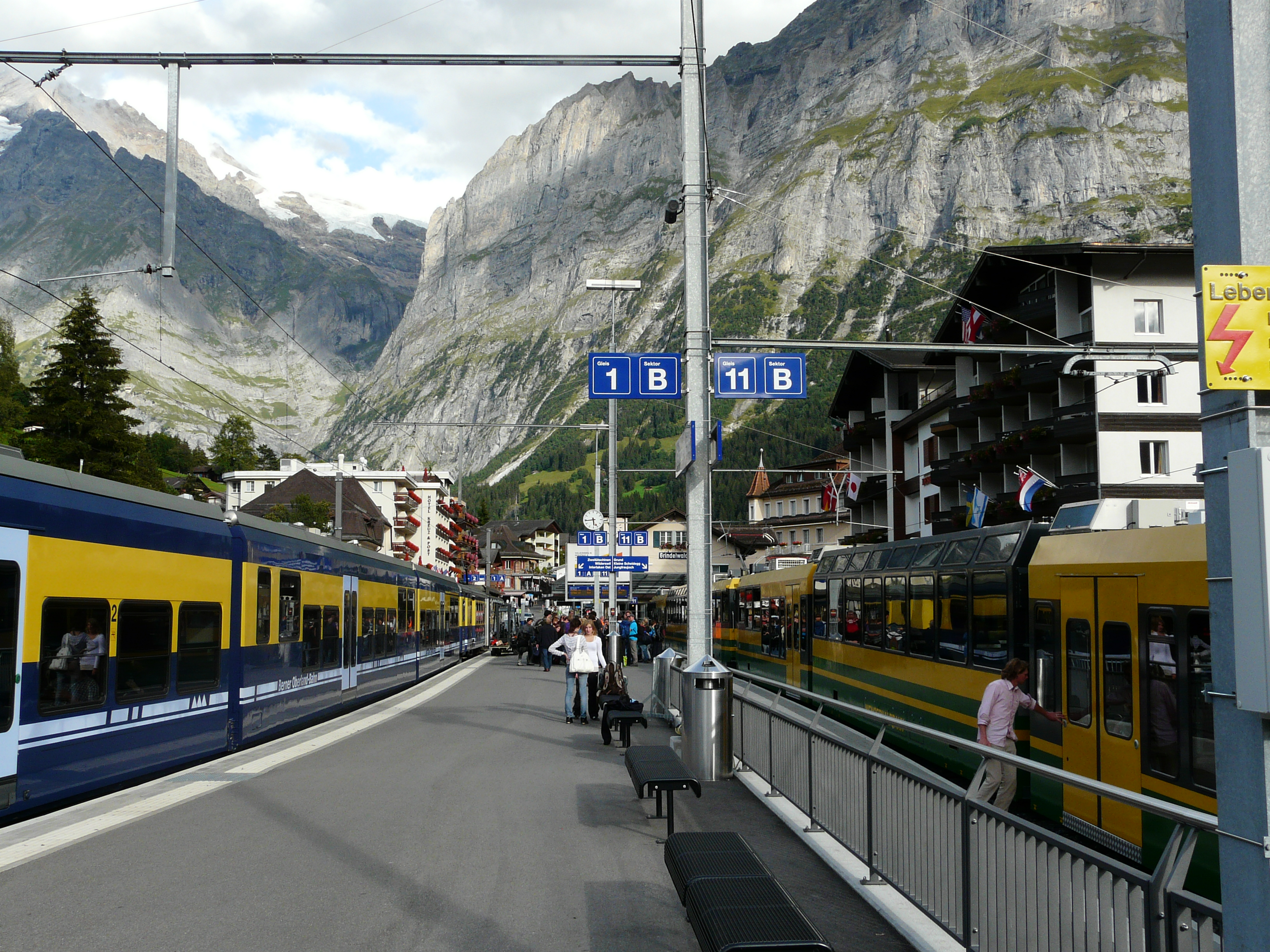
Grindelwald railway station with a BOB train (left) and a WAB train (right), looking towards the terminus

Grindelwald railway station, in the centre of Grindelwald village, is served by trains of the Berner Oberland Bahn (BOB), which run to Interlaken, and by trains of the Wengernalpbahn (WAB), which run to Kleine Scheidegg and on to Wengen and Lauterbrunnen. At Kleine Scheidegg, a connection can be made with the Jungfraubahn, which ascends inside the Eiger to the Jungfraujoch.

Besides Grindelwald station, there are eight other railway stations within the municipality of Grindelwald. These are Burglauenen, Grindelwald Terminal, and Schwendi on the BOB; Grindelwald Grund, Brandegg and Alpiglen on the WAB; and Eigerwand and Eismeer on the Jungfraubahn.

The Grindelwald–Männlichen gondola cableway connects Grindelwald with the Männlichen, and onward via the Wengen–Männlichen aerial cableway, which offers an alternative route to Wengen. The recently built Eiger Express gondola cableway directly connects Grindelwald to Eigergletscher, along the Jungfraubahn. Both the Männlichen and the Eiger Express start at Grindelwald Terminal.

Both mountain locations of First and Pfingstegg are also accessible by cable transport. In addition, during the summer season, buses run from Grindelwald to Meiringen via the Grosse Scheidegg, at nearly 2,000 metres (6,600 ft) above sea level.

== Winter sports ==
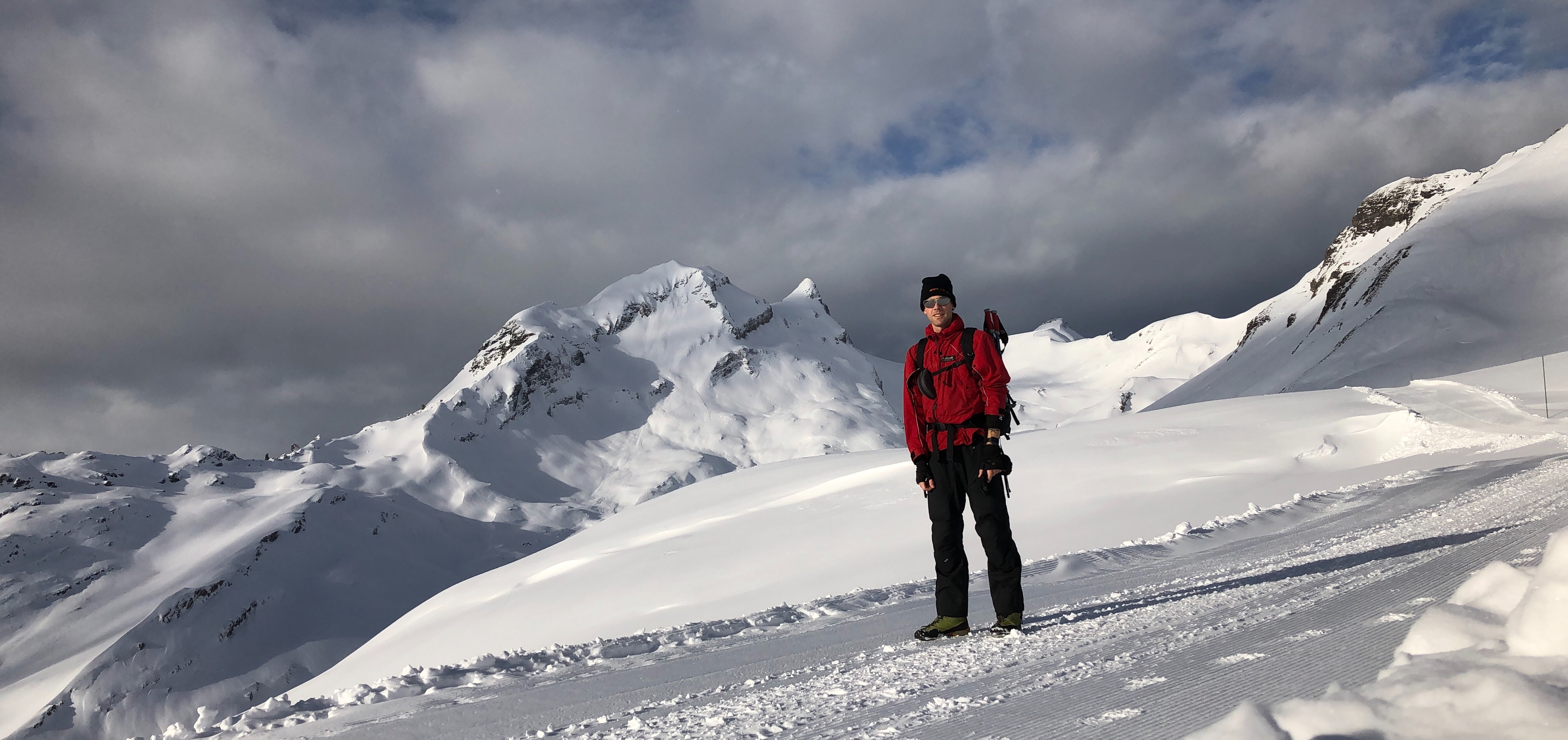
Winter hiking in the First area

This winter tourist destination has slopes appropriate for all levels of skiers, from beginner slopes, to the challenging Eiger glacier. There are activities for the non-skiers as well, such as tobogganing and groomed winter hiking trails. Grindelwald has also become a popular summer activity resort with many miles of hiking trails across the Alps. Mountaineers often start their ascents of the Eiger and the Wetterhorn at Grindelwald.

The first person to ski there was Englishman, Gerald Fox (who lived at Tone Dale House) who put his skis on in his hotel bedroom in 1881 and walked out through the hotel bar to the slopes wearing them.

== Education ==
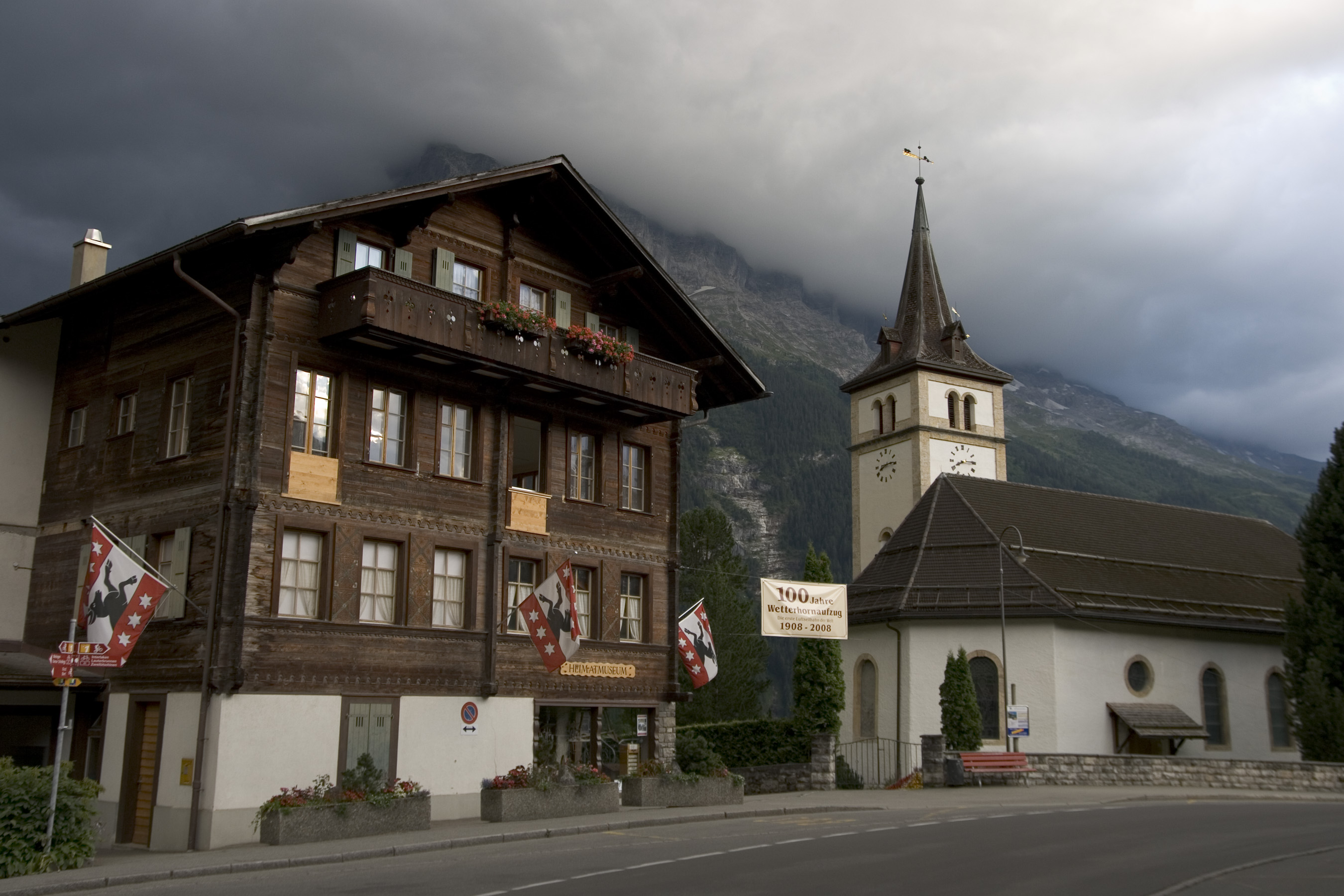
Heimatmuseum and Reformierte Kirche

In Grindelwald, about 1,647 or (40.5%) of the population have completed non-mandatory upper secondary education, and 302 or (7.4%) have completed additional higher education (either university or a Fachhochschule). Of the 302 who completed tertiary schooling, 57.9% were Swiss men, 24.5% were Swiss women, 9.3% were non-Swiss men and 8.3% were non-Swiss women.

The Canton of Bern school system provides one year of non-obligatory kindergarten, followed by six years of primary school. This is followed by three years of obligatory lower secondary school where the students are separated according to ability and aptitude. Following the lower secondary, students may attend additional schooling, or they may enter an apprenticeship.

During the 2010–11 school year, there were a total of 341 students attending classes in Grindelwald. There were three kindergarten classes with a total of 55 students in the municipality. Of the kindergarten students, 27.3% were permanent or temporary residents of Switzerland (not citizens) and 20.0% had a mother language different from the classroom language. The municipality had 12 primary classes and 187 students. Of the primary students, 15.0% were permanent or temporary residents of Switzerland (not citizens) and 12.8% had a mother tongue different from the classroom language. During the same year, there were six lower secondary classes with a total of 99 students. There were 8.1% who were permanent or temporary residents of Switzerland (not citizens) and 5.1% who had a mother tongue different from the classroom language.

As of 2000, there were 20 students in Grindelwald who came from another municipality, while 39 residents attended schools outside the municipality.

Grindelwald is home to the Bibliothek Grindelwald library. The library has (as of 2008) 6,144 books and other media, and loaned out 10,777 items in the same year. It was open a total of 136 days with average of 6.5 hours per week in 2008.

== Famous residents ==
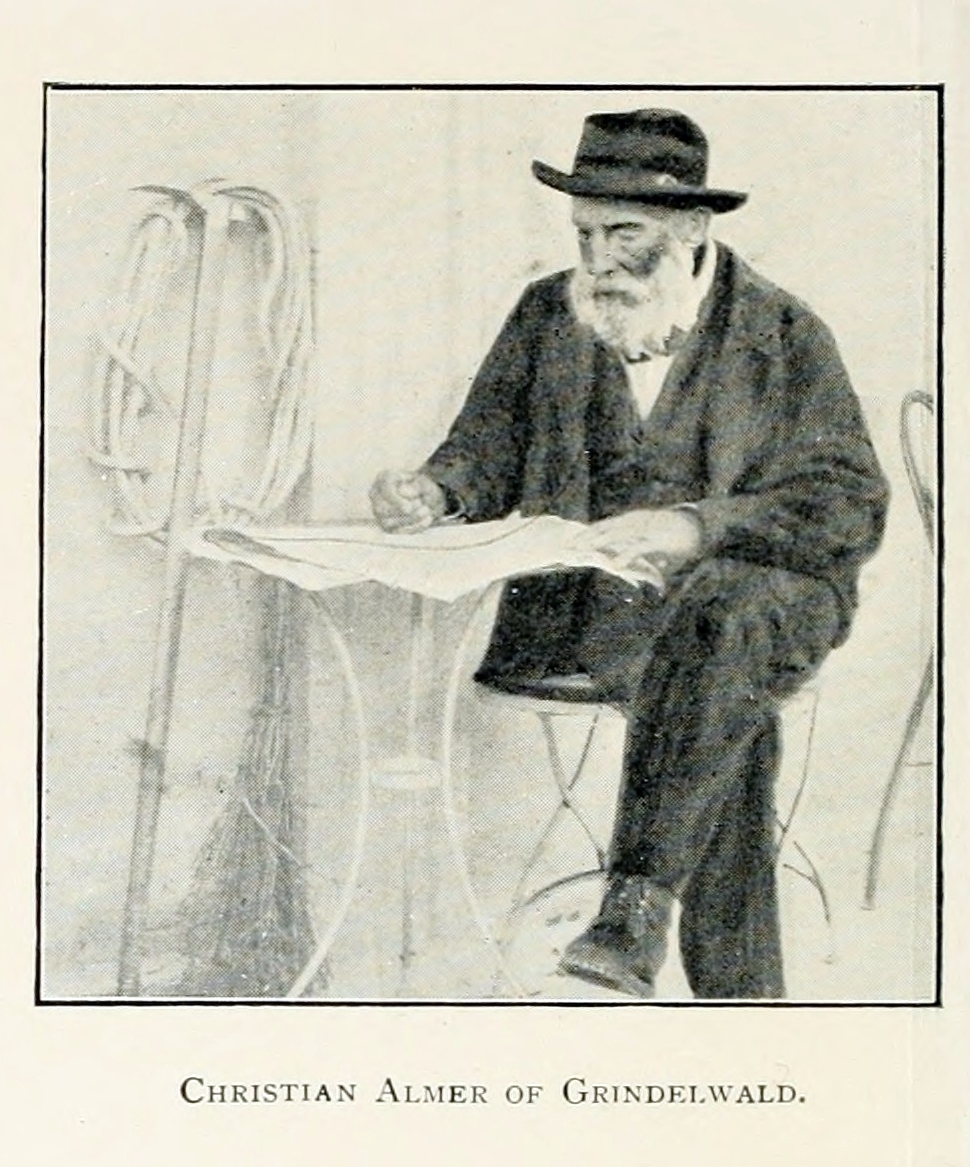
Christian Almer

- Richard Wagner (1813–1883), German composer.
- Christian Almer (1826–1898), mountain guide, first to ascend Eiger and many other mountains.
- Ulrich Almer (1849–1940), a Swiss mountain guide who made many premieres in the Alps.
- W. A. B. Coolidge (1850–1926), an American historian, theologian and mountaineer, lived here from 1885.
- Gottfried Strasser (1854–1912), a Swiss Protestant pastor, poet and writer.
- Fritz Steuri (1879–1950), a Swiss mountain climber and Nordic and alpine skier.
- Peter Kaufmann-Bohren (1886–1971), a Swiss ski instructor and mountain guide in the Swiss Alps and the Canadian Rockies.
- Hedy Schlunegger (1923–2003), gold medalist in the 1948 Winter Olympics for downhill skiing; the first gold medal ever awarded to a woman in downhill skiing.
- Oleg Protopopov (1932–2023) & Ludmila Belousova (1935–2017), the 1964 and 1968 Olympic figure skating champions.
- Martina Schild (born 1981), alpine skier, silver medalist in the 2006 Winter Olympics women's downhill race.
- Daniel Hofmann (born 1996), natural luger.

== In media and movies ==
- The 1969 James Bond movie On Her Majesty's Secret Service includes a chase through a skating rink and a Christmas festival in Grindelwald.
- The 1972 movie and television series George were filmed in the village. The show features a large St. Bernard that grew up in New York and comes for a permanent stay with his new owner in the Swiss Alps. Zsa Zsa Gabor appeared in an episode.
- The 1975 movie The Eiger Sanction (starring Clint Eastwood) featured the Hotel Bellevue des Alpes at Kleine Scheidegg as the film location where the group of climbers stayed during their attempt on the summit of the Eiger. In the summer of 1974, Clint Eastwood and his cast and crew stayed at the Hotel Bellevue des Alpes during filming.
- Grindelwald's mountains were used as the basis for the view of Alderaan in Star Wars: Episode III – Revenge of the Sith (2005).
- Many scenes of the IMAX documentary film The Alps (2007) were shot in the region of Grindelwald, particularly on the north face of the Eiger.
- Some of the action scenes in The Golden Compass (2007) were shot in Grindelwald.
- The Beckoning Silence, a British 2007 television movie, retraced the 1936 Eiger north face climbing disaster. It was filmed on location.
- North Face (2008, international), another movie retracing the 1936 disaster, was partially filmed on location.
- The character Gellert Grindelwald features in the Harry Potter universe.
- Grindelwald is where one of the Gran Turismo 2 circuits is set.
- Grindelwald is featured in a live performance by monologist and performance artist Joe Frank called Joe Frank in Concert which aired on NPR Playhouse & Pacifica FM station WBAI in 1981, and has been repeated in the years since.
