= Eiger =

Mountain in the Bernese Alps, Switzerland

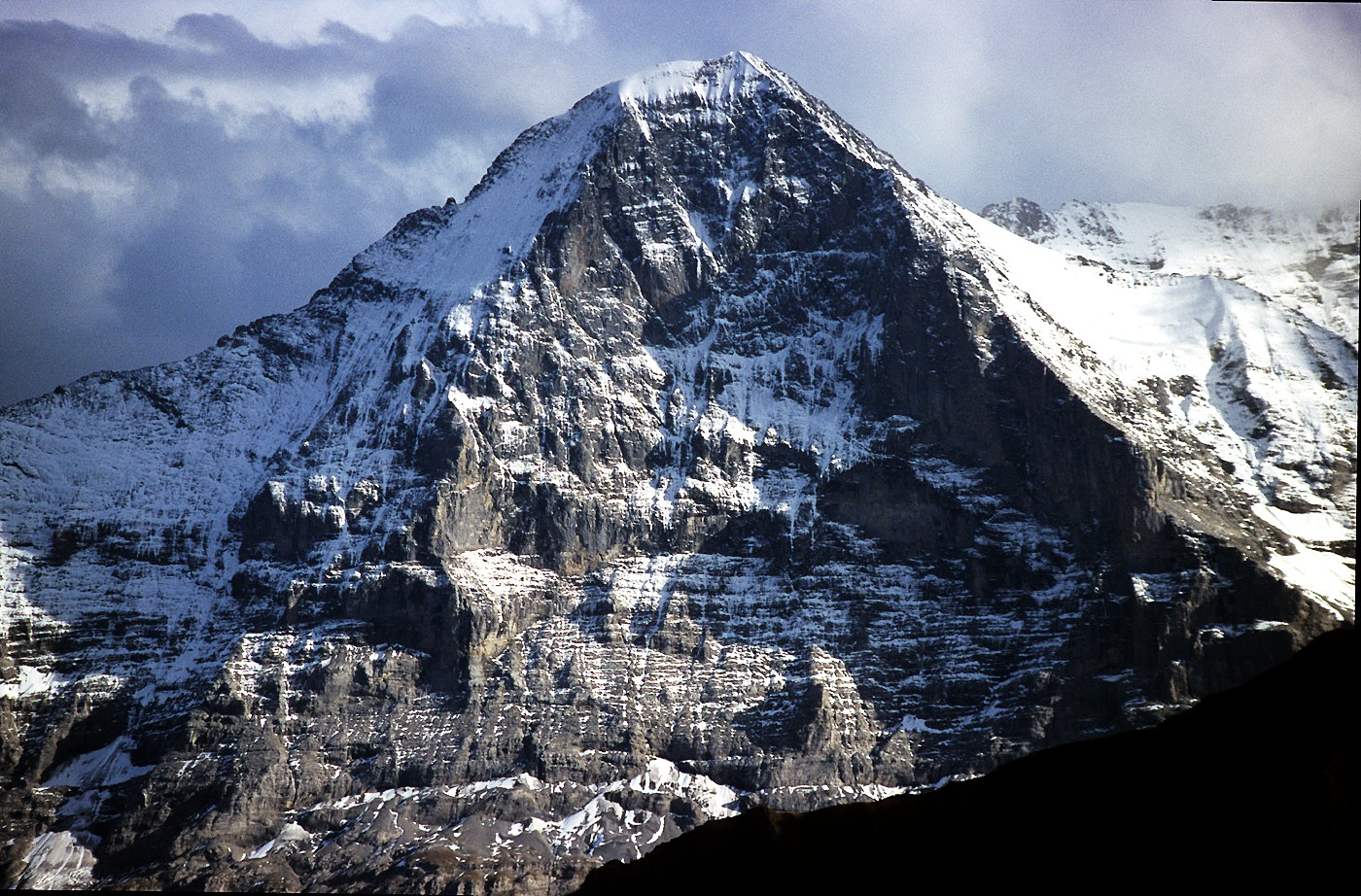
- The north face of the Eiger

Highest point
- Elevation: 3,967 m (13,015 ft)
- Prominence: 361 m (1,184 ft)
- Parent peak: Mönch
- Isolation: 2.0 km (1.2 mi)
- Listing: Great north faces of the Alps; Alpine mountains above 3000 m
- Coordinates: 46°34′39″N 8°0′19″E

Naming
- English translation: Ogre

Geography
- Location within Switzerland
- Location: Canton of Bern, Switzerland
- Parent range: Bernese Alps
- Topo map: Swisstopo 1229 Grindelwald

Geology
- Mountain type: Limestone

Climbing
- First ascent: 11 August 1858
- Easiest route: basic rock/snow/ice climb (AD)

The Eiger (Swiss Standard German pronunciation: [ˈaɪɡər]) is a 3,967-metre (13,015 ft) mountain of the Bernese Alps, overlooking Grindelwald and Lauterbrunnen in the Bernese Oberland of Switzerland, just north of the main watershed and border with Valais. It is the easternmost peak of a ridge crest that extends across the Mönch to the Jungfrau at 4,158 m (13,642 ft), constituting one of the most emblematic sights of the Swiss Alps. While the northern side of the mountain rises more than 3,000 m (10,000 ft) above the two valleys of Grindelwald and Lauterbrunnen, the southern side faces the large glaciers of the Jungfrau-Aletsch area, the most glaciated region in the Alps. The most notable feature of the Eiger is its nearly 1,800-metre-high (5,900 ft) north face of rock and ice, the biggest north face in the Alps. This substantial face towers over the resort of Kleine Scheidegg at its base, on the eponymous pass connecting the two valleys.

The first ascent of the Eiger was made by Swiss guides Christian Almer and Peter Bohren and Irishman Charles Barrington, who climbed the west flank on August 11, 1858. The north face, the "last problem" of the Alps, considered amongst the most challenging and dangerous ascents, was first climbed in 1938 by an Austrian-German expedition. The Eiger has been highly publicized for the many tragedies involving climbing expeditions. Since 1935, at least 64 climbers have died attempting the north face, earning it the German nickname Mordwand, literally "murder(ous) wall"—a pun on its correct title of Nordwand (North Wall).

Although the summit of the Eiger can be reached by experienced climbers only, a railway tunnel runs inside the mountain, and two internal stations provide easy access to viewing-windows carved into the rock face. They are both part of the Jungfrau Railway line, running from Kleine Scheidegg to the Jungfraujoch, between the Mönch and the Jungfrau, at the highest railway station in Europe. The two stations within the Eiger are Eigerwand (behind the north face) and Eismeer (behind the south face), at around 3,000 metres. The Eigerwand station has not been regularly served since 2016.

== Etymology ==
The first mention of Eiger, appearing as "mons Egere", was found in a property sale document of 1252, but there is no clear indication of how exactly the peak gained its name. The three mountains of the ridge are commonly referred to as the Virgin (German: Jungfrau – translates to "virgin" or "maiden"), the Monk (Mönch), and the Ogre (Eiger; the standard German word for ogre is Oger).

== Geographic setting and description ==
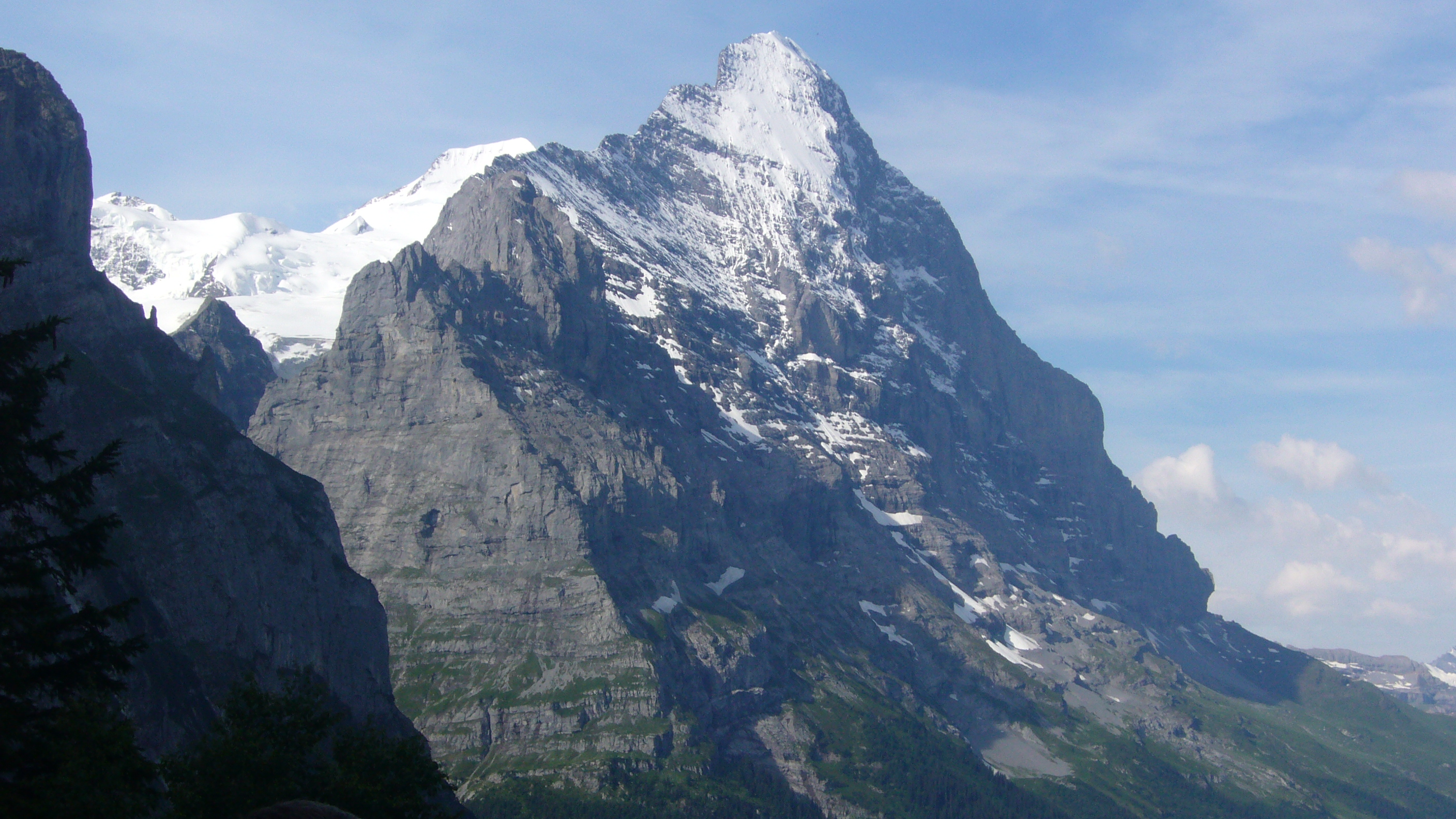
The northeast side of the Eiger

Aerial view of the south face of the Eiger with the Mittellegi ridge to the right of the summit

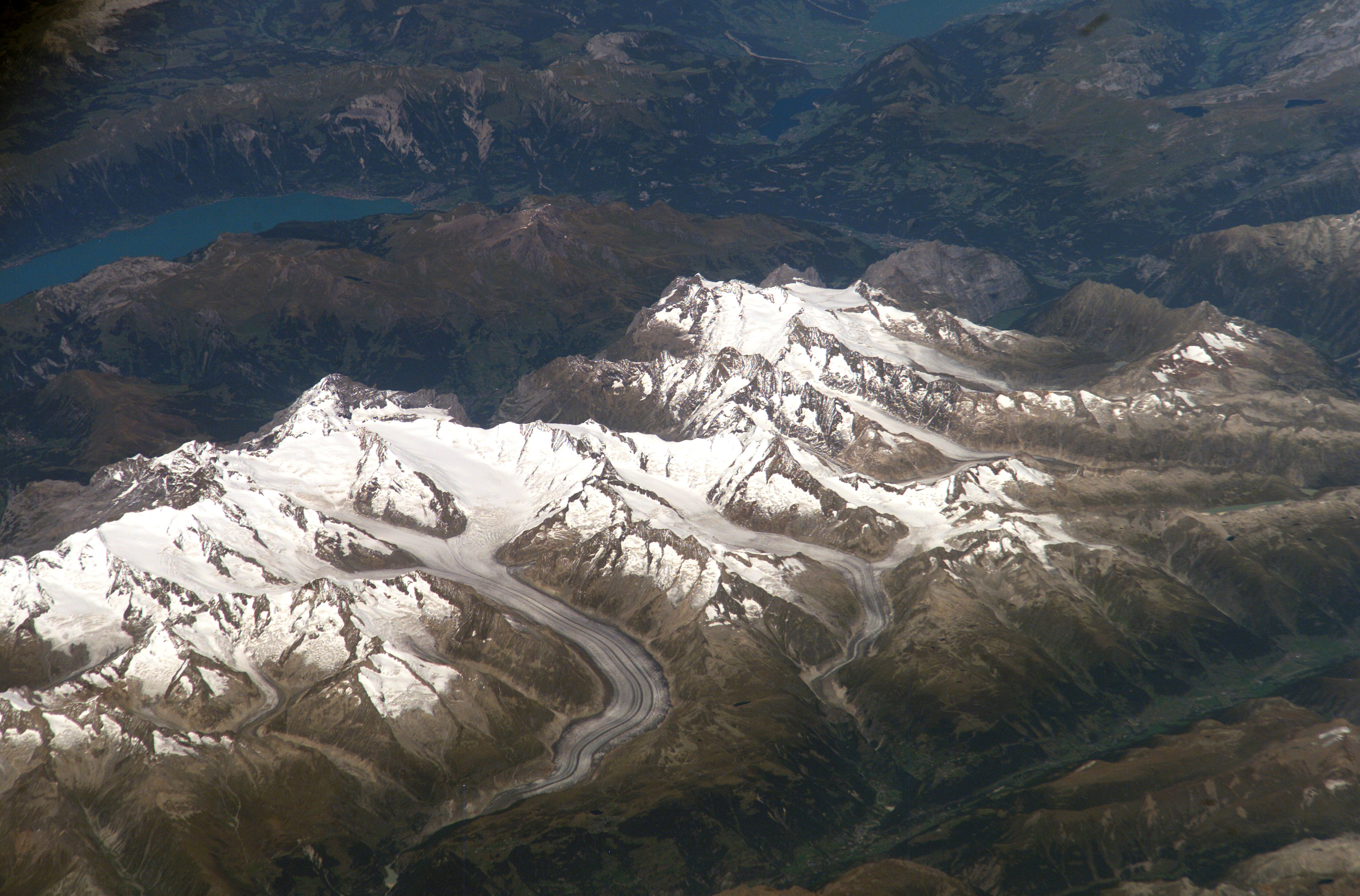
ISS image of the Bernese Alps showing the Wetterhorn (right), Eiger (centre), Jungfrau (left), Lake Brienz (background) and Aletsch glacier (foreground).

The Eiger is located above the Lauterbrunnen Valley to the west and Grindelwald to the north in the Bernese Oberland region of the canton of Bern. It forms a renowned mountain range of the Bernese Alps together with its two companions: the Jungfrau (4,158 m (13,642 ft)) about 5.6 kilometres (3.5 mi) southwest of it and the Mönch (4,107 m (13,474 ft)) about in the middle of them. The nearest settlements are Grindelwald, Lauterbrunnen (795 m (2,608 ft)) and Wengen (1,274 m (4,180 ft)). The Eiger has three faces: north (or more precisely NNW), east (or more precisely ESE), and west (or more precisely WSW). The northeastern ridge from the summit to the Ostegg (lit.: eastern corner, 2,709 m (8,888 ft)), called Mittellegi, is the longest on the Eiger. The north face overlooks the gently rising Alpine meadow between Grindelwald (943 m (3,094 ft)) and Kleine Scheidegg (2,061 m (6,762 ft)), a mountain railways junction and a pass, which can be reached from both sides, Grindelwald and Lauterbrunnen/Wengen – by foot or train.

Politically, the Eiger (and its summit) belongs to the Bernese municipalities of Grindelwald and Lauterbrunnen. The Kleine Scheidegg (literally, the small parting corner) connects the Männlichen-Tschuggen range with the western ridge of the Eiger. The Eiger does not properly form part of the main chain of the Bernese Alps, which borders the canton of Valais and forms the watershed between the Rhine and the Rhône, but constitutes a massive limestone buttress, projecting from the crystalline basement of the Mönch across the Eigerjoch. Consequently, all sides of the Eiger feed finally the same river, namely the Lütschine.

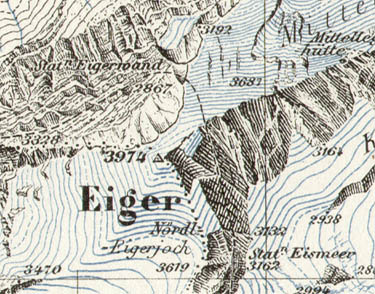
The Eiger on the Siegfried Map

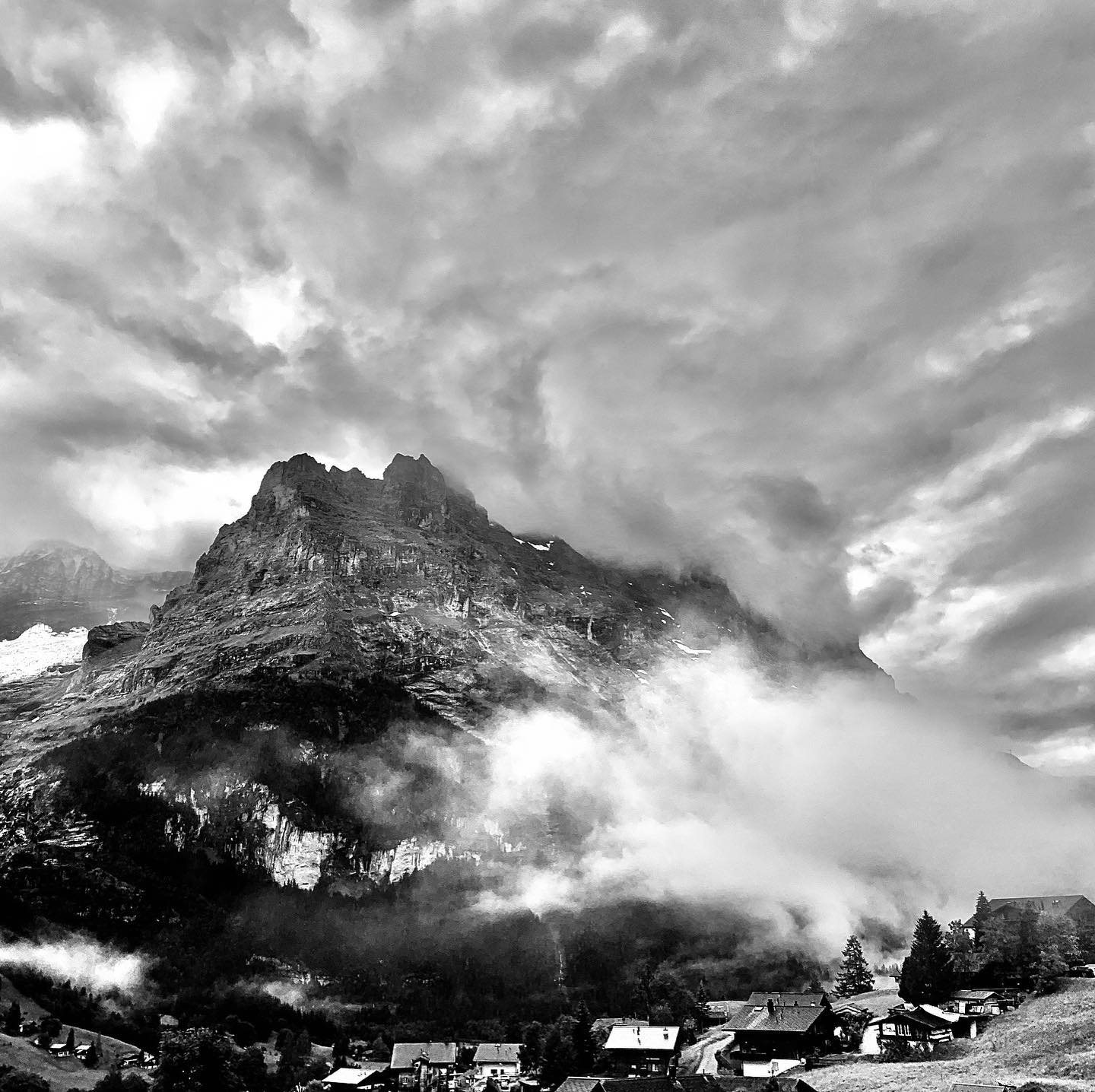
Eiger

Eiger's water is connected through the Weisse Lütschine (the white one) in the Lauterbrunnen Valley on the west side (southwestern face of the Eiger) and through the Schwarze Lütschine (the black one) running through Grindelwald (northwestern face), which meet each other in Zweilütschinen (lit.: the two Lütschinen) where they form the proper Lütschine. The east face is covered by the glacier called Ischmeer (Bernese German for Ice Sea), which forms one upper part of the fast-retreating Lower Grindelwald Glacier. These glaciers' water forms a short creek, which is also confusingly called the Weisse Lütschine, but enters the black one already in Grindelwald together with the water from the Upper Grindelwald Glacier. Therefore, all the water running down the Eiger converges at the northern foot of the Männlichen (2,342 m (7,684 ft)) in Zweilütschinen (654 m (2,146 ft)), about 10 kilometres (6.2 mi) northwest of the summit, where the Lütschine begins its northern course to Lake Brienz and the Aare (564 m (1,850 ft)).

Although the Eiger's north face is almost ice-free, significant glaciers lie on the other sides of the mountain. The Eiger Glacier flows on the southwestern side of the Eiger, from the crest connecting it to the Mönch down to 2,400 m (7,900 ft), south of Eigergletscher railway station, and feeds the Weisse Lütschine through the Trümmelbach. On the east side, the Ischmeer–well visible from the windows of Eismeer railway station–flows eastwards from the same crest then turns to the north below the impressive wide Fiescherwand, the north face of the Fiescherhörner triple summit (4,049 m (13,284 ft)) down to about 1,600 m (5,200 ft) of the Lower Grindelwald Glacier system.

The massive composition of the Eiger, Mönch, and Jungfrau constitutes a symbolic sight of the Swiss Alps and is visible from many places on the Swiss Plateau and the Jura Mountains in the northwest. The higher Finsteraarhorn (4,270 m (14,010 ft)) and Aletschhorn (4,190 m (13,750 ft)), which are located about 10 kilometres (6.2 mi) to the south, are generally less visible and situated in the middle of glaciers in less accessible areas. As opposed to the north side, the south and east sides of the range consist of large valley glaciers extending for up to 22 kilometres (14 mi), the largest (beyond the Eiger drainage basin) being those of Grand Aletsch, Fiesch, and Aar Glaciers, and is thus uninhabited. The whole area, the Jungfrau-Aletsch protected area, comprising the highest summits and largest glaciers of the Bernese Alps, was inscribed as a UNESCO World Heritage Site in 2001.

In July 2006, a piece of the Eiger fell from the east face, amounting to approximately 700,000 cubic metres of rock. As it had been noticeably cleaving for several weeks and fell into an uninhabited area, no injuries or buildings were hit.

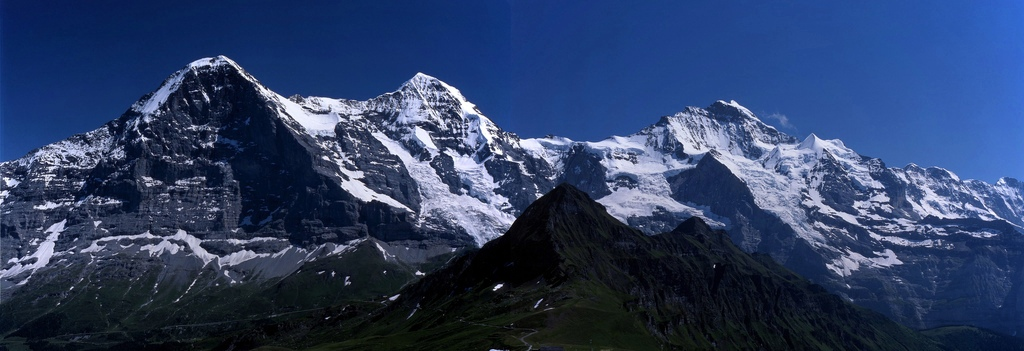
The Eiger with the Mönch and the Jungfrau

== North face ==
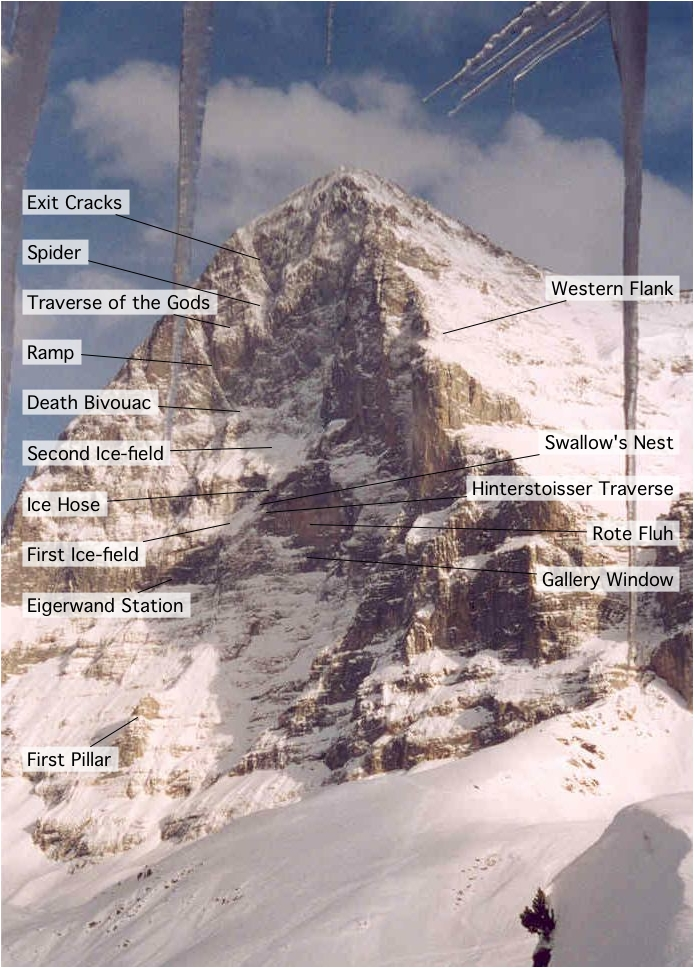
North face

The Nordwand, German for "north wall" or "north face", is the north face of the Eiger (also known as the Eigernordwand: "Eiger north wall" or Eigerwand). It is one of the three great north faces of the Alps, along with the north faces of the Matterhorn and the Grandes Jorasses (known as 'the Trilogy') and also one of the biggest sheer faces in Europe, between 1,600 m and 1,800 m (over a mile) high. The face overlooks Kleine Scheidegg and the valley of Grindelwald. At 2,866 metres inside the mountain lies the Eigerwand railway station. The station is connected to the north face by a tunnel opening at the face, which has sometimes been used to rescue climbers. The Eiger Trail, at the base of the north face, runs from Eigergletscher to Alpiglen railway stations. The approach hike to the base of the face takes less than an hour from Eigergletscher.

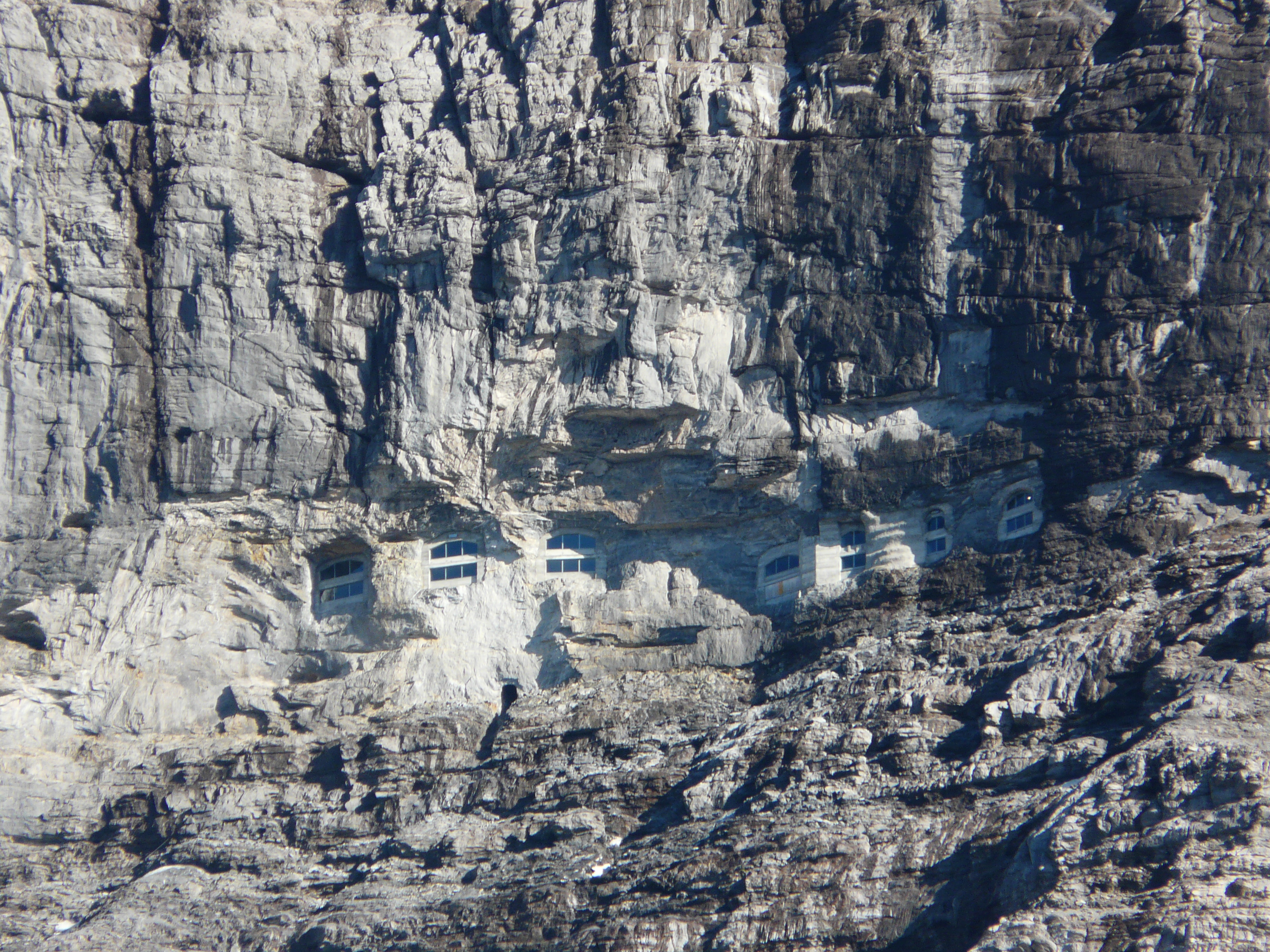
The windows of the Eigerwand Station

Some of the notable features on the north face are (from the bottom): First Pillar, Eigerwand Station, First Ice-field, Hinterstoisser Traverse, Swallow's Nest, Ice Hose, Second Ice-field, Death Bivouac, Ramp, Traverse of the Gods, Spider and Exit Cracks.

In 1938, Alpine Journal editor Edward Lisle Strutt called the face "an obsession for the mentally deranged" and "the most imbecile variant since mountaineering first began." In the same year, however, the north face was finally climbed on 24 July by Andreas Heckmair, Ludwig Vörg, Heinrich Harrer and Fritz Kasparek, a German–Austrian group.

A portion of the upper face is called "The White Spider", as snow-filled cracks radiating from an ice field resemble the legs of a spider. Harrer used this name for the title of his book about his successful climb, Die Weisse Spinne (translated into English as The White Spider: The Classic Account of the Ascent of the Eiger). During the first successful ascent, the four men were caught in an avalanche as they climbed the Spider, but all had enough strength to resist being swept off the face.

Since then, the north face has been climbed many times. Today, it is regarded as a formidable challenge, not only because of its technical difficulties, exceeding those of some of the 8,000 m peaks in the Himalaya and Karakoram but also because of the increased rockfall and diminishing ice-fields. Climbers are increasingly electing to challenge the Eiger in winter when the crumbling face is strengthened by ice.

Since 1935, at least sixty-four climbers have died attempting the north face, earning it the German nickname, Mordwand, or "murderous wall", a play on the face's German name Nordwand.

== Climbing history ==
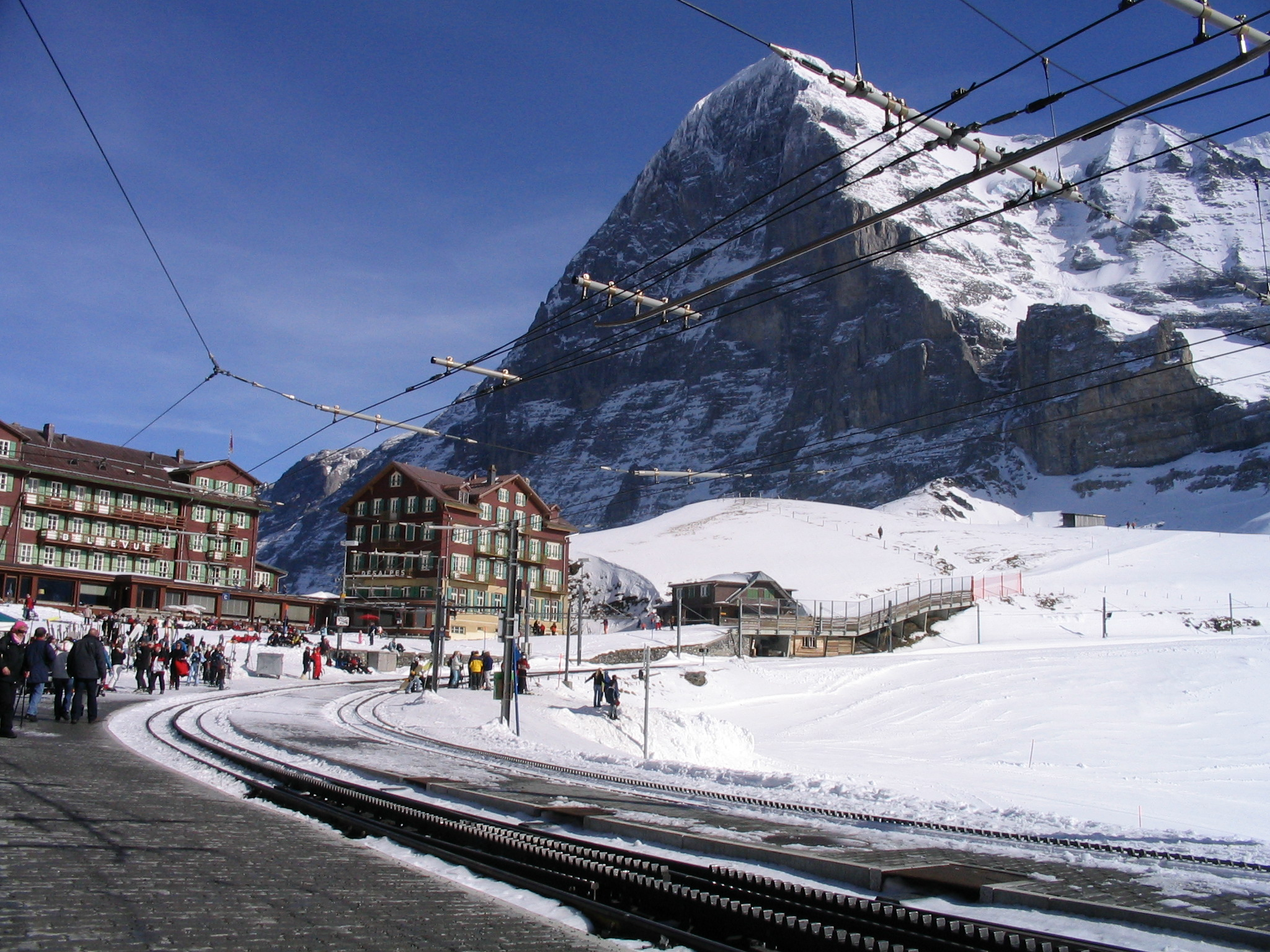
View from the railway station of Kleine Scheidegg, close enough to allow people to watch the climbers on the Eiger.

While the summit was reached without much difficulty in 1858 by a complex route on the west flank, the battle to climb the north face has captivated the interest of climbers and non-climbers alike. Before it was successfully climbed, most of the attempts on the face ended tragically, and the Bernese authorities even banned climbing it and threatened to fine any party that should attempt it again. However, the enthusiasm that animated the young talented climbers from Austria and Germany finally vanquished its reputation of unclimbability when a party of four climbers successfully reached the summit in 1938 by what is known as the "1938" or "Heckmair" route.

The climbers that attempted the north face could be easily watched through the telescopes from the Kleine Scheidegg, a pass between Grindelwald and Lauterbrunnen, connected by rail. The contrast between the comfort and civilization of the railway station and the agonies of the young men slowly dying a short yet uncrossable distance away led to intensive coverage by the international media.

After World War II, the north face was climbed twice in 1947, first by a party of two French guides, Louis Lachenal and Lionel Terray, then by a Swiss party consisting of H. Germann, with Hans and Karl Schlunegger.

=== First ascent ===
In 1857, the first recorded attempt was made by Christian Almer, Christian Kaufmann, Ulrich Kaufmann guiding the Austrian alpinist Sigismund Porges. They did manage the first ascent of neighboring Mönch instead. Porges, however, successfully made the second ascent of the Eiger in July 1861 with the guides Christian Michel, Hans and Peter Baumann.

The first ascent was made by the western flank on August 11, 1858, by Charles Barrington with guides Christian Almer and Peter Bohren. On the previous afternoon, the party walked up to the Wengernalp hotel. From there, they started the ascent of the Eiger at 3:30 a.m. Barrington describes the route much as it is followed today, staying close to the edge of the north face much of the way. They reached the summit at about noon, planted a flag, remained for 10 minutes, and descended in about four hours. Barrington describes reaching the top, saying, "The two guides kindly gave me the place of the first man up." After the descent, the party was escorted to the Kleine Scheidegg hotel, where their ascent was confirmed by observation of the flag left on the summit. The hotel owner then fired a cannon to celebrate the first ascent. According to Harrer's The White Spider, Barrington was originally planning to make the first ascent of the Matterhorn, but his finances did not allow him to travel there as he was already staying in the Eiger region.

=== Mittellegi ridge ===
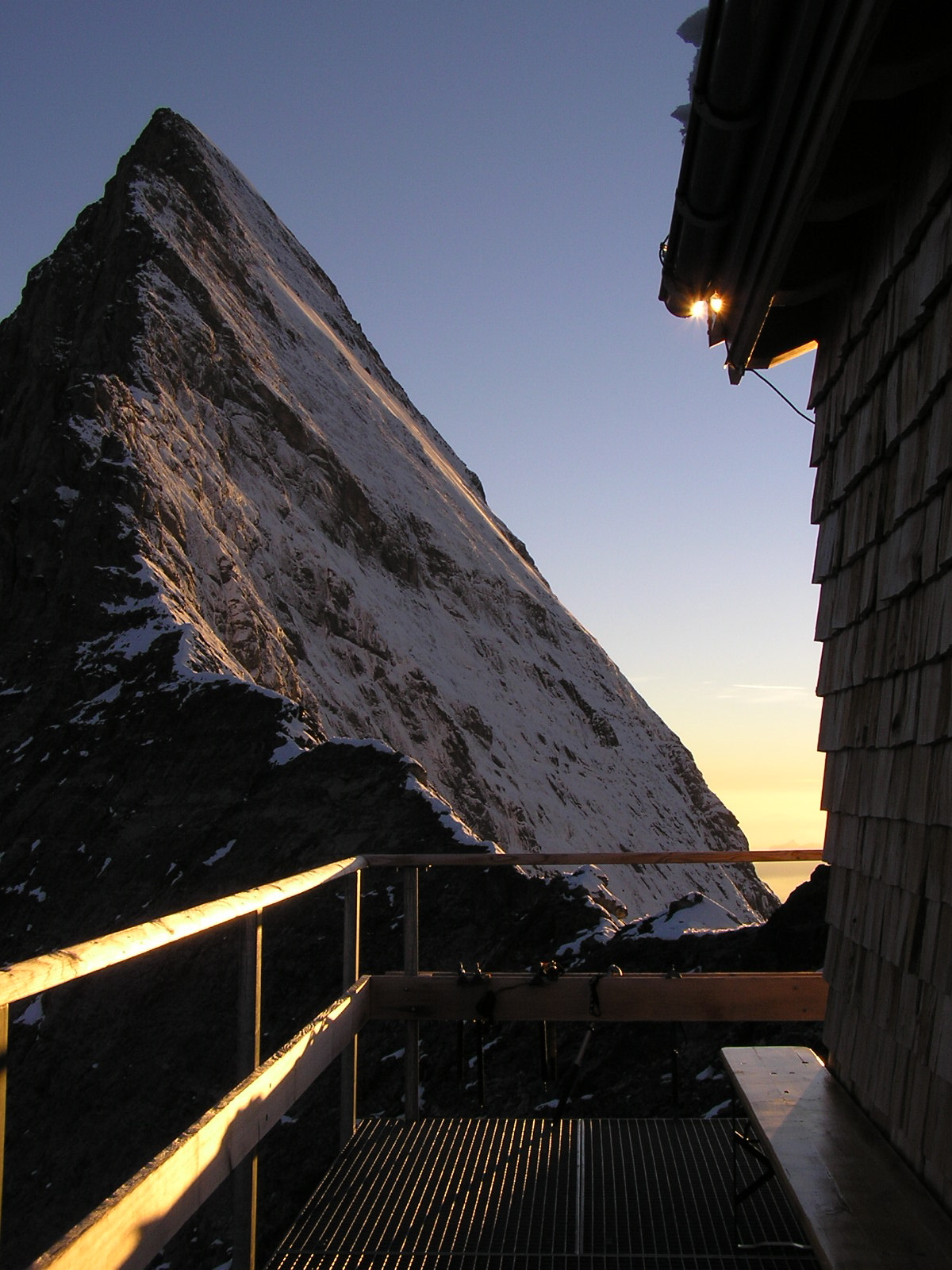
The ridge from the Mittellegi Hut

Although the Mittellegi ridge had already been descended by climbers (since 1885) with ropes in the difficult sections, it remained unclimbed until 1921. On the 10th of September of that year, Japanese climber Yuko Maki, along with Swiss guides Fritz Amatter, Samuel Brawand, and Fritz Steuri, made the first successful ascent of the ridge. The previous day, the party approached the ridge from the Eismeer railway station of the Jungfrau Railway and bivouacked for the night. They started the climb at about 6:00 a.m. and reached the summit of the Eiger at about 7:15 p.m., after an over 13 hours gruelling ascent. Shortly after, they descended the west flank. They finally reached Eigergletscher railway station at about 3:00 a.m. the next day.

=== Attempts on the north face ===
==== 1935 ====
In 1935, two young German climbers from Bavaria, Karl Mehringer and Max Sedlmeyer, arrived at Grindelwald to attempt the ascent of the north face. After waiting some time for the weather to improve, they set off, reaching the height of the Eigerwand station before stopping for their first bivouac. The following day, facing greater difficulties, they gained little height. On the third day, they made hardly any vertical gain. That night, the weather deteriorated, bringing snow and low clouds that shrouded the mountain from the observers below. Avalanches began to sweep the face. Two days later, the weather briefly cleared, and the two men were glimpsed a little higher and about to bivouac for the fifth night before clouds descended again. A few days later, the weather finally cleared, revealing a completely white north face. Weeks later, the German World War I ace Ernst Udet went searching for the missing men with his aircraft, eventually spotting one of them frozen to death in what became known as the "Death Bivouac". Sedlmeyer's body was found at the foot of the face the following year by his brothers Heinrich and Martin Meier, who were part of a group looking for the victims of the 1936 climbing disaster. Mehringer's remains were found in 1962 by Swiss climbers below the "Flat Iron" (Bügeleisen) at the lefthand end of the second ice field.

==== 1936 ====
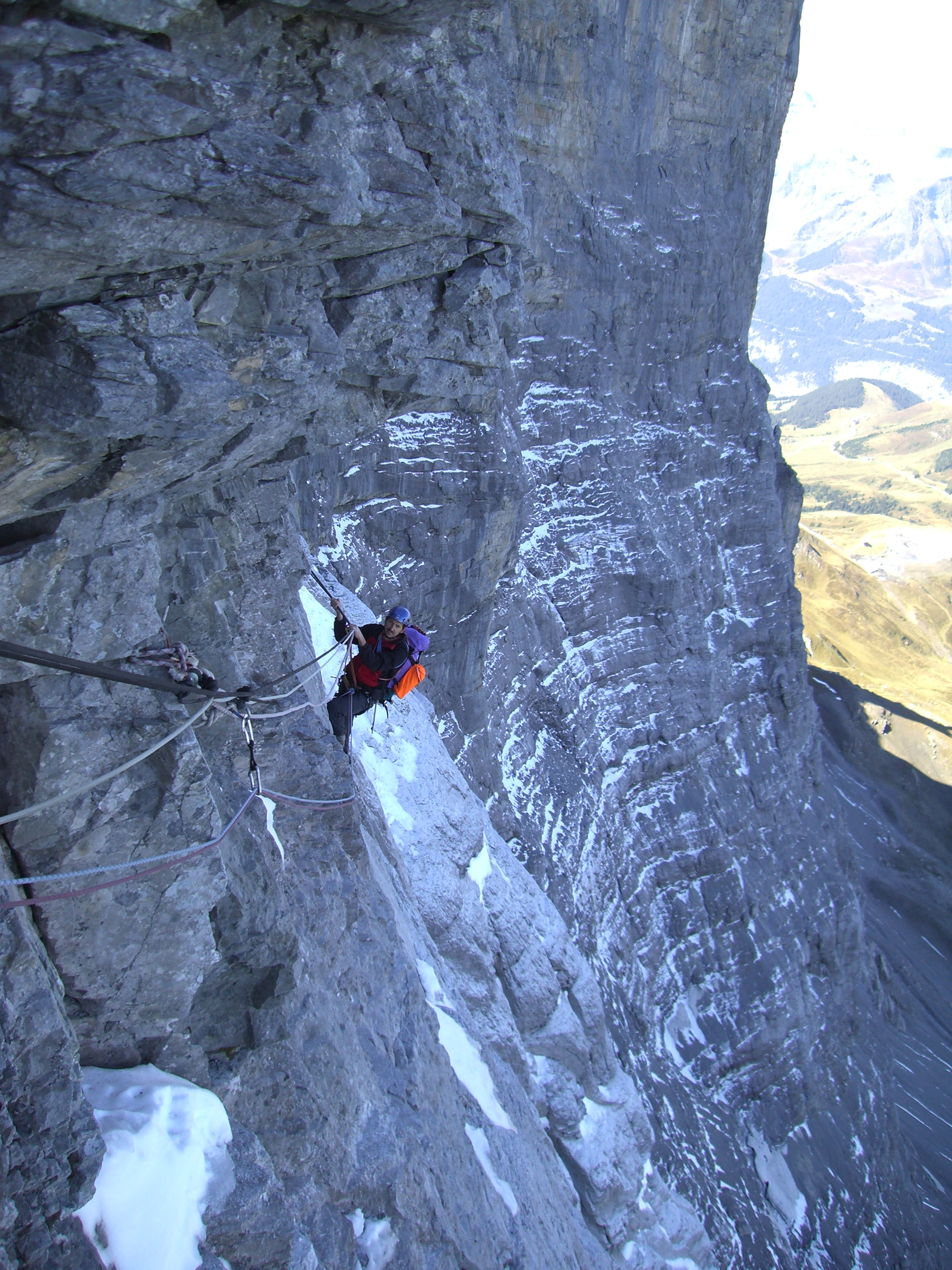
A climber on the Hinterstoisser traverse

Ten young climbers from Austria and Germany came to Grindelwald and camped at the foot of the mountain the following year. Before their attempts started, one of them was killed during a training climb, and the weather was so bad during that summer that, after waiting for a change and seeing none on the way, several members of the party gave up. Of the four that remained, two were Bavarians, Andreas Hinterstoisser and Toni Kurz, and two were Austrians, Willy Angerer and Edi Rainer. When the weather improved, they preliminarily explored the lowest part of the face. Hinterstoisser fell 37 metres (121 ft) but was not injured. A few days later, the four men finally began the ascent of the face. They climbed quickly, but on the next day, after their first bivouac, the weather changed; clouds came down and hid the group from the observers. They did not resume the climb until the following day, when, during a break, the party was seen descending, but the climbers could be seen only intermittently from the ground. The group had no choice but to retreat since Angerer had suffered serious injuries from falling rock. The party became stuck on the face when they could not recross the difficult Hinterstoisser Traverse, from which they had taken the rope they had first used to climb it. The weather then deteriorated for two days. They were ultimately swept away by an avalanche, which only Kurz survived, hanging on a rope. Three guides started on a precarious rescue attempt. They failed to reach him but came within shouting distance and learned what had happened. Kurz explained the fate of his companions: one had fallen down the face, another was frozen above him, and the third had fractured his skull in falling and was hanging dead on the rope.

In the morning, the three guides returned, traversing the face from a hole near the Eigerwand station and risking their lives under constant avalanches. Toni Kurz was still alive but almost helpless, with one hand and one arm wholly frozen. Kurz hauled himself off the cliff after cutting loose the rope that bound him to his dead teammate below and climbed back onto the face. The guides could not pass an unclimbable overhang that separated them from Kurz. They gave him a rope long enough to reach them by tying two ropes together. While descending, Kurz could not get the knot to pass through his carabiner. He tried for hours to reach his rescuers, who were only a few metres below him. Then he began to lose consciousness. One of the guides, climbing on another's shoulders, could touch the tip of Kurz's crampons with his ice axe but could not reach higher. Kurz was unable to descend further and, wholly exhausted, died slowly.

==== 1937 ====
An attempt was made in 1937 by Mathias Rebitsch and Ludwig Vörg. Although the effort was unsuccessful, they were nonetheless the first climbers who returned alive from a serious attempt on the face. They started the climb on 11 August and reached a high point of a few rope lengths above Death Bivouac. A storm broke, and after three days on the wall, they had to retreat. This was the first successful withdrawal from a significant height on the wall.

=== First ascent of the north face ===
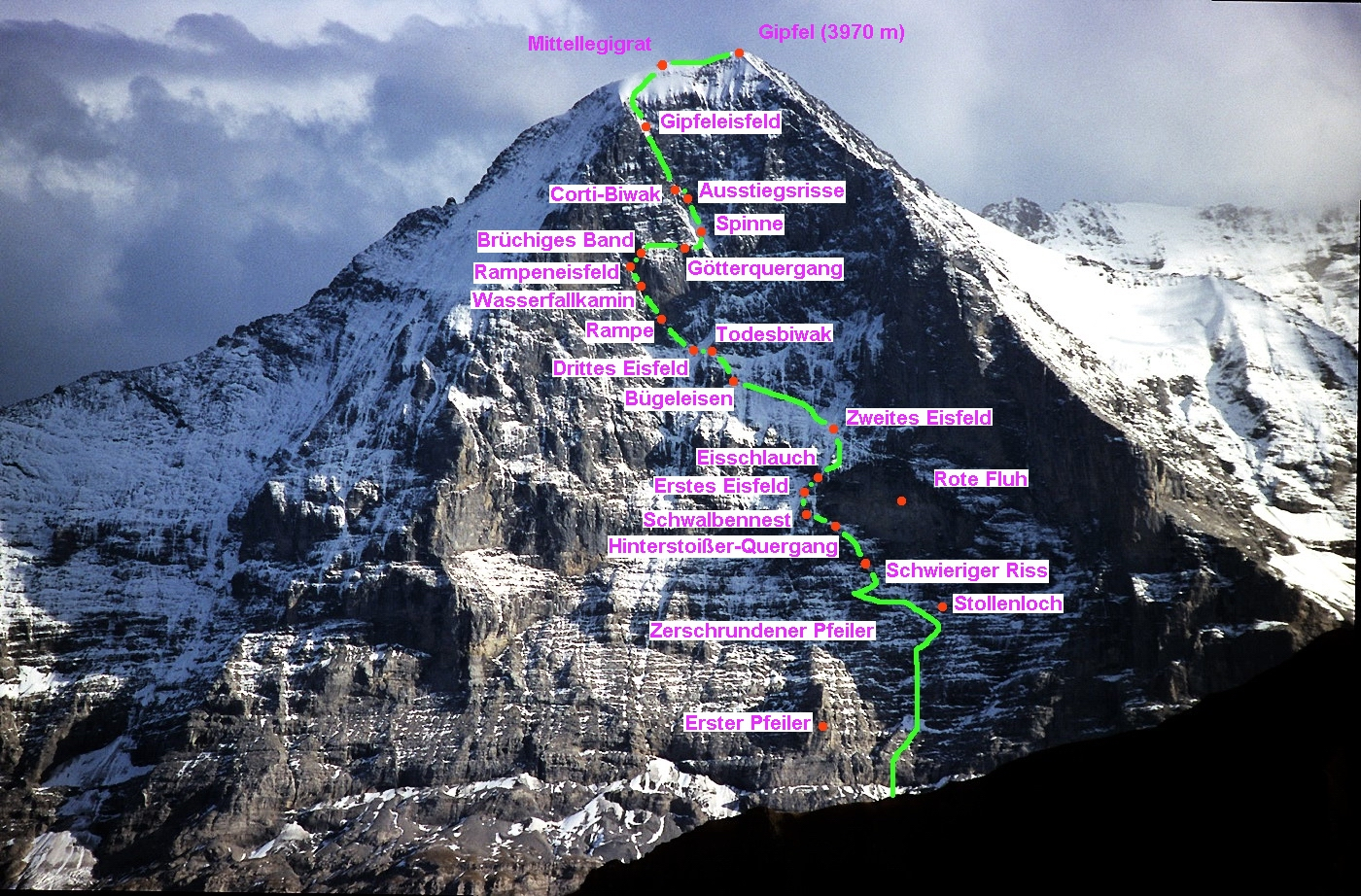
The Heckmair route (ED2, V−, A0, 60°).

The north face was first climbed on July 24, 1938, by Anderl Heckmair, Ludwig Vörg, Heinrich Harrer and Fritz Kasparek in a German–Austrian party. The party had initially consisted of two independent teams: Harrer (who did not have a pair of crampons on the climb) and Kasparek were joined on the face by Heckmair and Vörg, who had started their ascent a day later and had been helped by the fixed rope that the lead team had left across the Hinterstoisser Traverse. The two groups, led by the experienced Heckmair, decided to join their forces and roped together as a single group of four. Heckmair later wrote: "We, the sons of the older Reich, united with our companions from the Eastern Border to march together to victory."

Snow avalanches constantly threatened the expedition. They climbed as quickly as possible between the falls. On the third day, a storm broke, and the cold was intense. The four men were caught in an avalanche as they climbed "the Spider", the snow-filled cracks radiating from an ice-field on the upper face, but all possessed sufficient strength to resist being swept off the face. The members successfully reached the summit at four o'clock in the afternoon. They were so exhausted that they only had the strength to descend by the regular route through a raging blizzard.

=== Other notable events ===
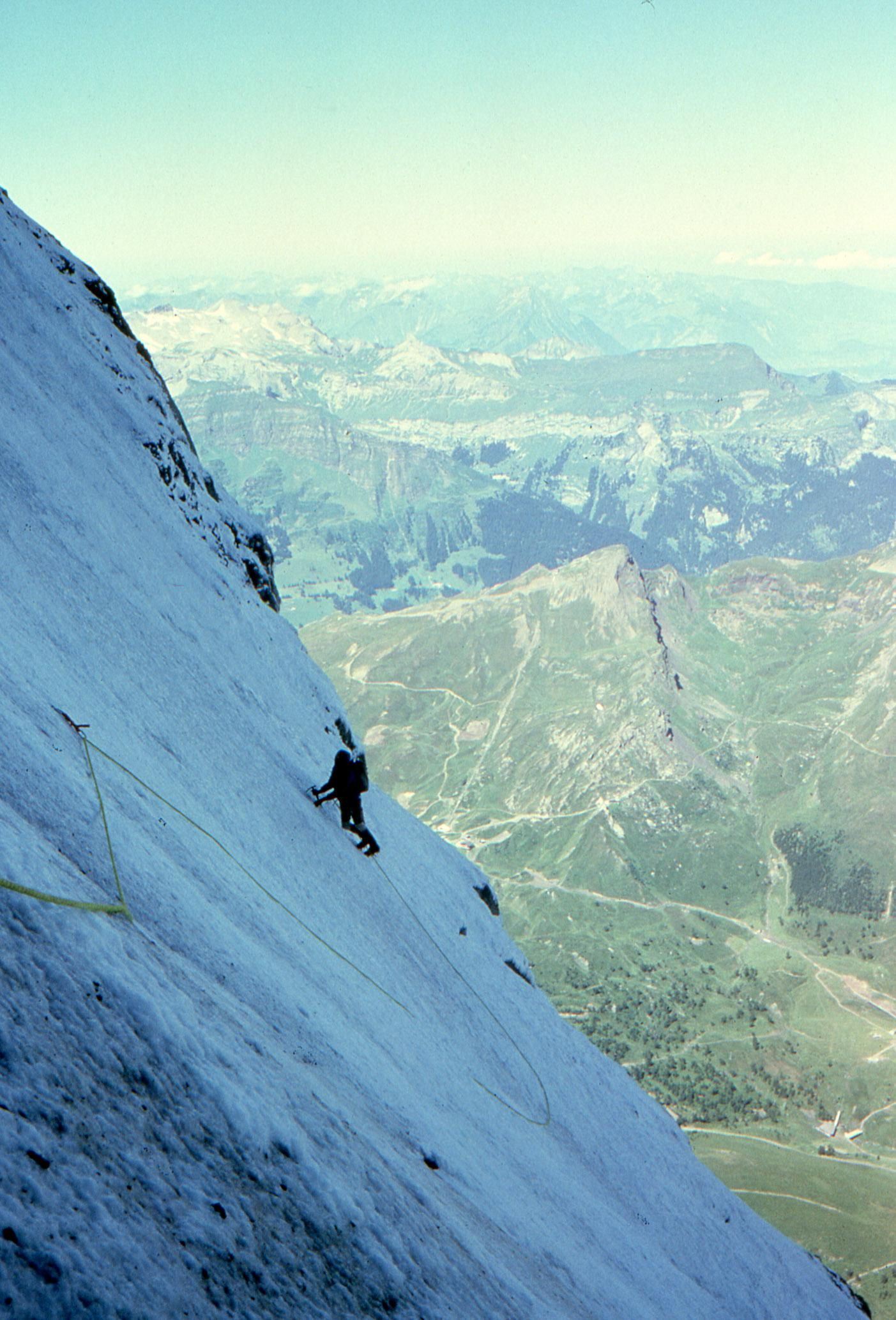
A climber on the second ice-field

- 1864 (Jul 27): Fourth ascent, and first ascent by a woman, Lucy Walker, who was part of a group of six guides (including Christian Almer and Melchior Anderegg) and five clients, including her brother Horace Walker
- 1871: First ascent by the southwest ridge, 14 July (Christian Almer, Christian Bohren, and Ulrich Almer guiding W. A. B. Coolidge and Meta Brevoort).
- 1890: First ascent in winter, Ulrich Kaufmann and Christian Jossi guiding C. W. Mead and G. F. Woodroffe.
- 1924: First ski ascent and descent via the Eiger glacier by Englishman Arnold Lunn and the Swiss Fritz Amacher, Walter Amstutz, and Willy Richardet.
- 1932: First ascent of the northeast face ("Lauper route") by Hans Lauper, Alfred Zürcher, Alexander Graven and Josef Knubel
- 1969 First ascent of the Japanese Direct route, on the North face, by a team of six which was led by Takio Kato, and included his brother Yasuo Kato, Satoru Nigishi, Amano Hirofumi, Susumu Kubo and one woman, Michiko Imai.
- 1970: First ski descent over the west flank by Sylvain Saudan.
- 1986: Welshman Eric Jones becomes the first person to BASE jump from the Eiger.
- 1988: Original Route (ED2), north face, Eiger (3970m), Alps, Switzerland, first American solo (nine and a half hours) by Mark Wilford.
- 1991: First ascent, Metanoia Route, North Face, solo, winter, without bolts, Jeff Lowe.
- 1991 (24 February): First start with a paraglider from the Eiger North Face, Martin Beerli.
- 2006 (14 June): François Bon and Antoine Montant make the first speedflying descent of the Eiger.
- 2006 (15 July): Approximately 700,000 cubic metres (20 million cubic feet) of rock from the east side collapses. No injuries or damage were reported.
- 2015 (23 July): A team of British Para-Climbers reached the summit via the West Flank Route. The team included John Churcher, the world's first blind climber to summit the Eiger, who was sight-guided by the team leader, Mark McGowan. Colin Gourlay enabled the ascent of other team members, including Al Taylor, who has multiple sclerosis, and the young autistic climber Jamie Owen from North Wales. The ascent was filmed by the adventure filmmakers Euan Ryan and Willis Morris of Finalcrux Films.
- 2026 (13 August): British alpinist Fay Manners and Swiss climber Roger Schäli complete a new route on the North Face, named Solar Eclipse, after spending 13 nights on the wall. Manners becomes the first British woman to establish a new route on the face.

== Books and films ==
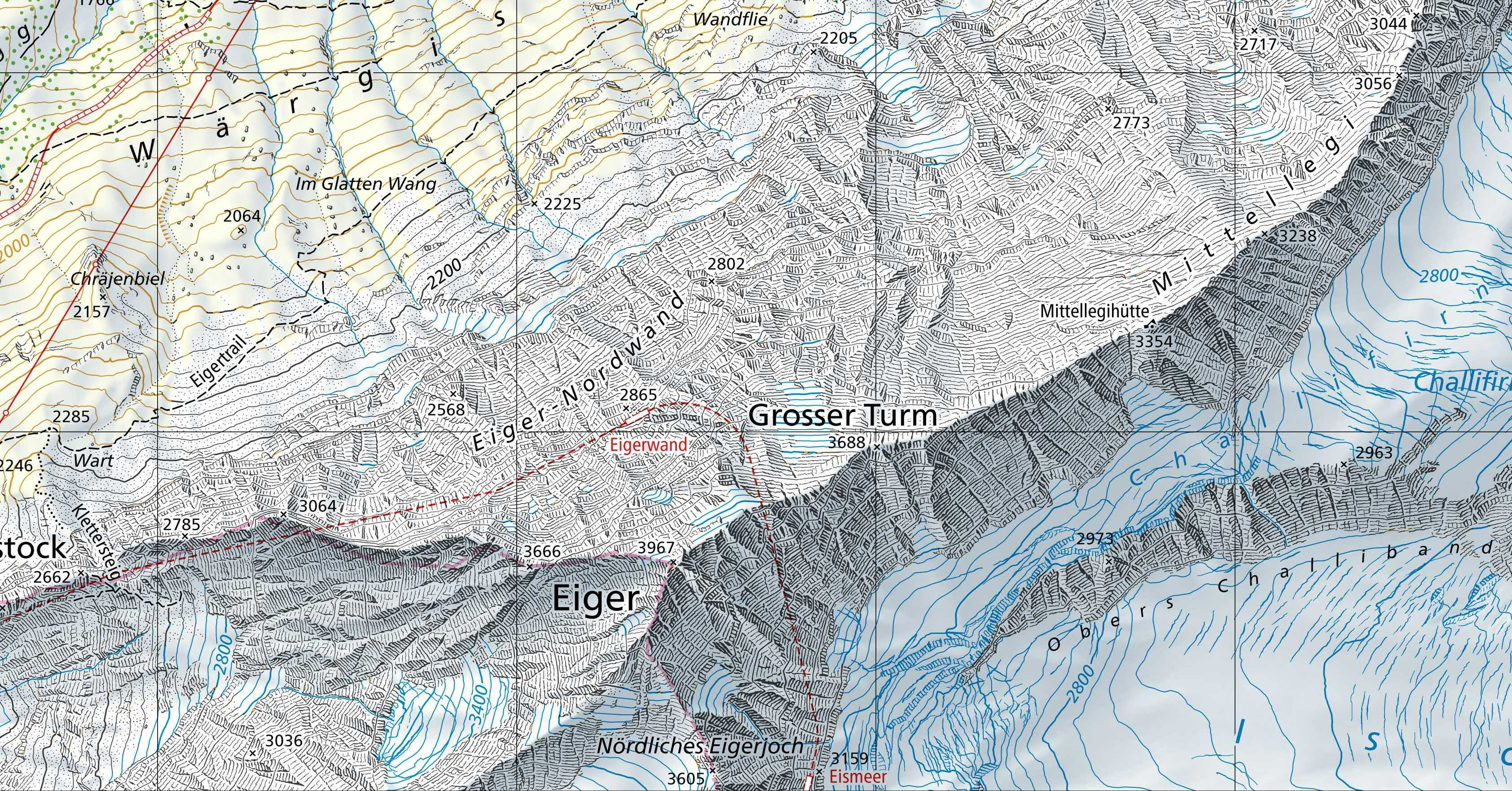
Eiger on the Swiss national map 1:25'000

- The 1959 book The White Spider by Heinrich Harrer describes the first successful ascent of the Eiger north face.
- The Climb Up To Hell, 1962, by Jack Olson, is an account of the ill-fated 1957 attempted climb of the north face by an Italian four-person team and the dramatic rescue of the sole survivor mounted by an international all-volunteer group of rescuers.
- Eiger Direct, 1966, by Dougal Haston and Peter Gillman, London: Collins, also known as Direttissima; the Eiger Assault
- The 1971 novel The Ice Mirror by Charles MacHardy describes the main character's second attempted ascent of the Eiger north face.
- The 1972 novel The Eiger Sanction is an action/thriller novel by Rodney William Whitaker (writing under the pseudonym Trevanian), based around the climbing of the Eiger. This was then made into the 1975 film The Eiger Sanction starring Clint Eastwood and George Kennedy. The Eiger Sanction film crew included very experienced mountaineers (e.g., Mike Hoover, Dougal Haston, and Hamish MacInnes, see Summit, 52, Spring 2010) as consultants, to ensure accuracy in the climbing footage, equipment, and techniques.
- The Eiger, 1974, by Dougal Haston, London: Cassell
- The 1982 book Eiger, Wall of Death by Arthur Roth is a historical account of the first ascents of the North Face.
- The 1982 book Traverse of The Gods by Bob Langley is a World War II spy thriller where a group escaping from Nazi Germany is trapped and the only possible exit route is via the Nordwand.
- Eiger, 1983, a documentary film by Leo Dickinson of Eric Jones' 1981 solo ascent of the North Face.
- Eiger Dreams, 1990, a collection of essays by Jon Krakauer, begins with an account of Krakauer's attempt to climb the north face.
- Eiger: The Vertical Arena (German edition, 1998; English edition, 2000), edited by Daniel Anker, is a comprehensive climbing history of the north face authored by 17 climbers, with numerous photographs and illustrations.
- The IMAX film The Alps features John Harlin III's climb up the north face in September 2005. Harlin's father, John Harlin II, set out 40 years earlier to attempt a direct route (the direttissima) up the 6,000-foot (1,800 m) face, the so-called Harlin route. At 1300 m, his rope broke, and he fell to his death. Composer James Swearingen created a piece named Eiger: Journey to the Summit in his memory.
- The 2007 docu/drama film The Beckoning Silence featuring mountaineer Joe Simpson, recounting—with filmed reconstructions—the ill-fated 1936 expedition up the north face of the Eiger and how Heinrich Harrer's book The White Spider inspired him to take up climbing. The film followed Simpson's eponymous 2003 book. Those playing the parts of the original climbing team were Swiss mountain guides Roger Schäli (Toni Kurz), Simon Anthamatten (Andreas Hinterstoisser), Dres Abegglen (Willy Angerer) and Cyrille Berthod (Edi Rainer). The documentary won an Emmy Award the subsequent year.
- The 2008 German historical fiction film Nordwand is based on the 1936 attempt to climb the Eiger north face. The film is about the two German climbers Toni Kurz and Andreas Hinterstoisser, involved in a competition with an Austrian duo to be the first to scale the north face of Eiger.
- The 2010 documentary Eiger: Wall of Death by Steve Robinson.

== See also ==
- 1936 Eiger climbing disaster
- Eigerwand railway station
- List of deaths on eight-thousanders
- List of mountains of the canton of Bern
- List of highest mountains of Switzerland
- List of mountains of Switzerland
- List of mountains of Switzerland above 3000 m

== Works cited ==
- Anker, Daniel (2000). Eiger: The Vertical Arena. Seattle: The Mountaineers.
- Harrer, Heinrich (1959). The White Spider: The History of the Eiger's North Face (in German) (3rd ed.). London.
- Pagel, David (1999). "My Dinner with Anderl". Ascent. Golden, Colorado: AAC Press: 13–26.
- Simpson, Joe (2002). The Beckoning Silence. London: Jonathan Cape Publishers. ISBN 0-09-942243-3.
