= Eismeer railway station =

Underground railway station in Switzerland

Eismeer
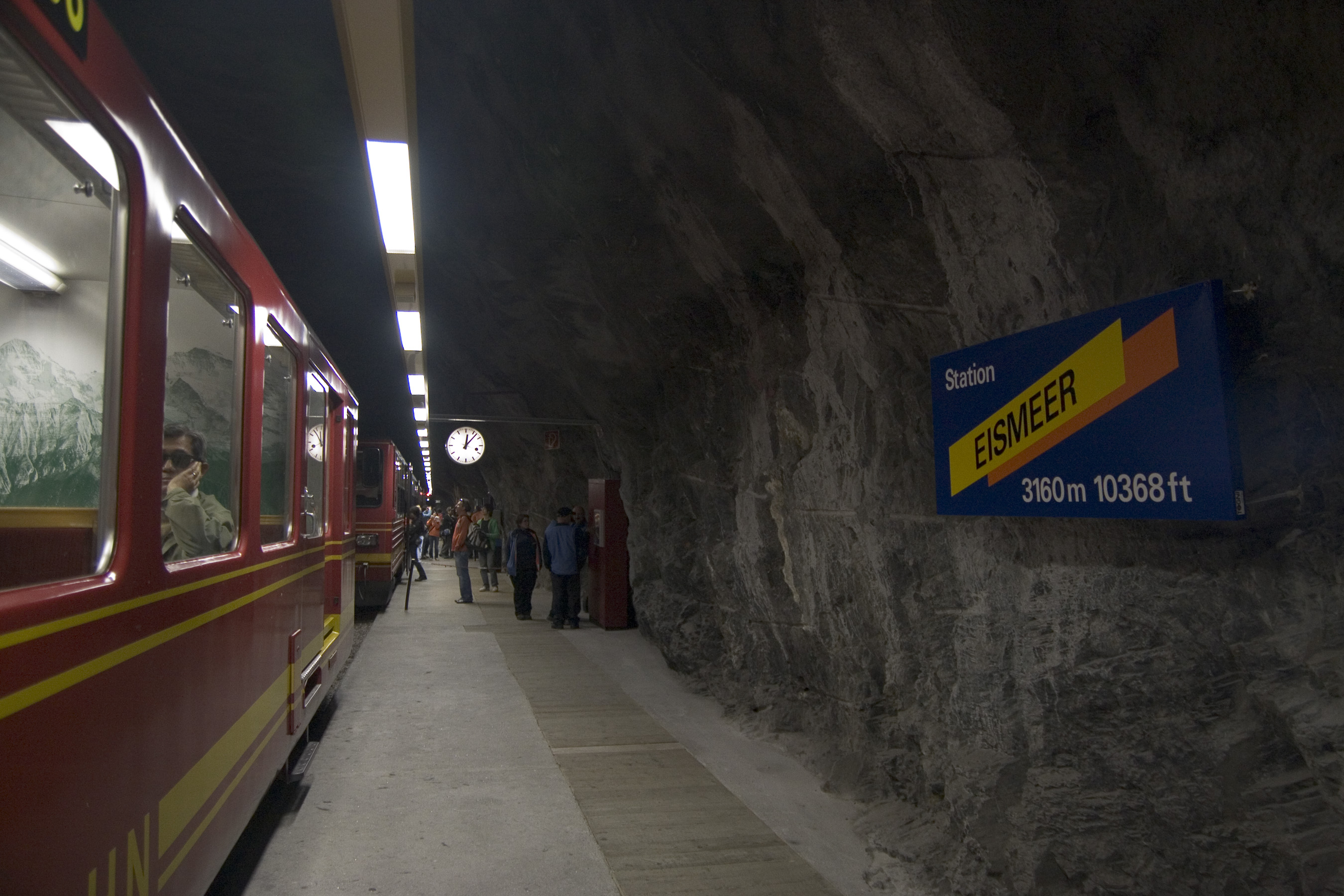

General information
- Location: Eismeer; Grindelwald, Bern; Switzerland
- Coordinates: 46°34′20″N 08°00′37″E
- Elevation: 3,159 m (10,364 ft)
- Owner: Jungfrau Railway (JB)
- Operator: JB
- Line: Jungfraubahn

History
- Opened: 25 July 1905; 121 years ago

Services
Preceding station	Jungfraubahn AG	Following station
Eigergletscher towards Kleine Scheidegg	Jungfrau Railway	Jungfraujoch Terminus
Location
- Location within Switzerland

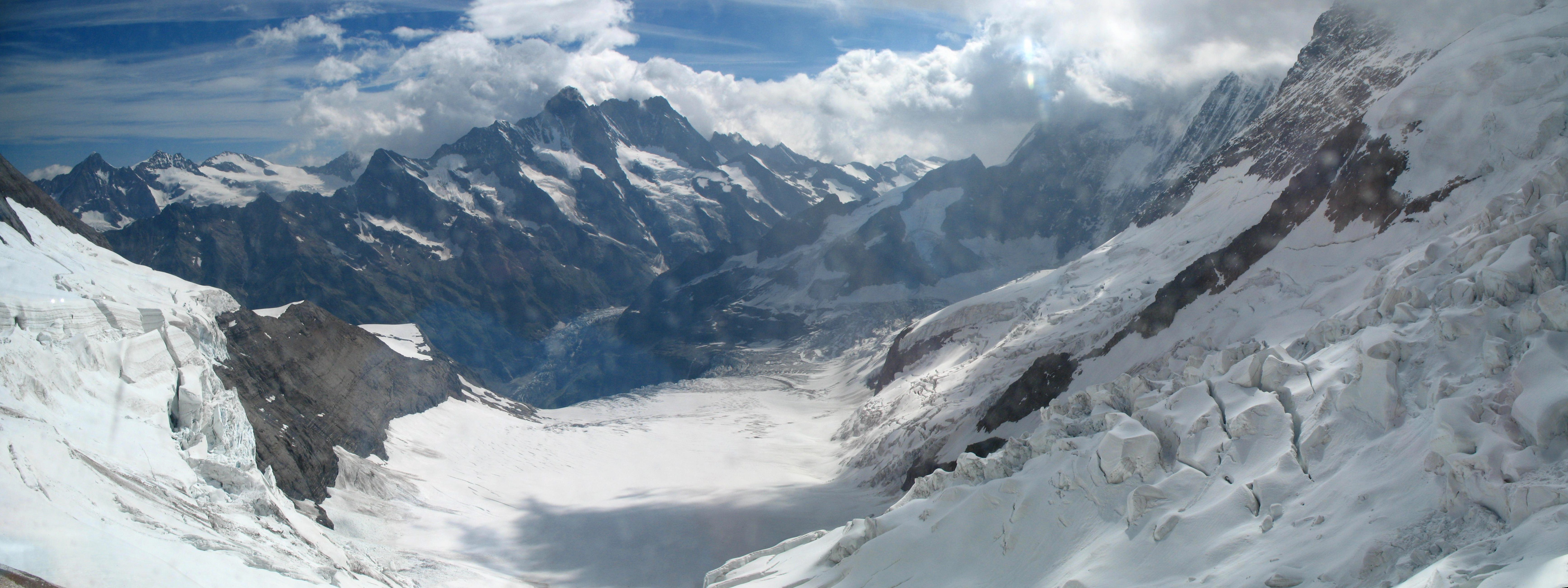
View of the Ischmeer (lit.: Ice Sea) from the station

Eismeer railway station (German for Ice Sea) is an underground railway station bored into the mountain Eiger on the Jungfrau Railway, which runs to the Jungfraujoch from Kleine Scheidegg. It lies at an altitude of 3,159 metres above sea level, which makes it the second highest railway station in Europe. Located just behind the south-east face of the Eiger, the station's principal purpose is to allow passengers to observe the view of the glacier Ischmeer (lit.: Ice Sea, formerly called Grindelwald-Fiescher Glacier). To that end, uphill trains stop at the station for five minutes.

The station opened on 25 July 1905, with the extension of the Jungfraubahn from its previous terminus at the now-closed Eigerwand station. The building of the line this far had depleted the railway company's finances, and for the next seven years, Eismeer was to remain the upper terminus. After further fund-raising and an extended construction period, the line was extended to Jungfraujoch station in 1912 and Eismeer became an intermediate stop.

The station also enables access of the Mittellegi Hut via a tunnel that leads out onto the Challifirn glacier. As a consequence, it is also a frequent starting point for ascents of the Eiger via the Mittellegi Ridge.

Administratively, the station is in the municipality of Grindelwald in the canton of Bern.

The following passenger trains operate:

Operator	Train type	Route	Typical frequency	Notes
Jungfraubahn		Kleine Scheidegg - Eigergletscher - Eismeer - Jungfraujoch	2 per hour	Uphill trains only

== See also ==
- List of highest railway stations in Switzerland
- List of buildings and structures above 3000 m in Switzerland
