= Fay Manners =

British alpinist and skier (born 1987)

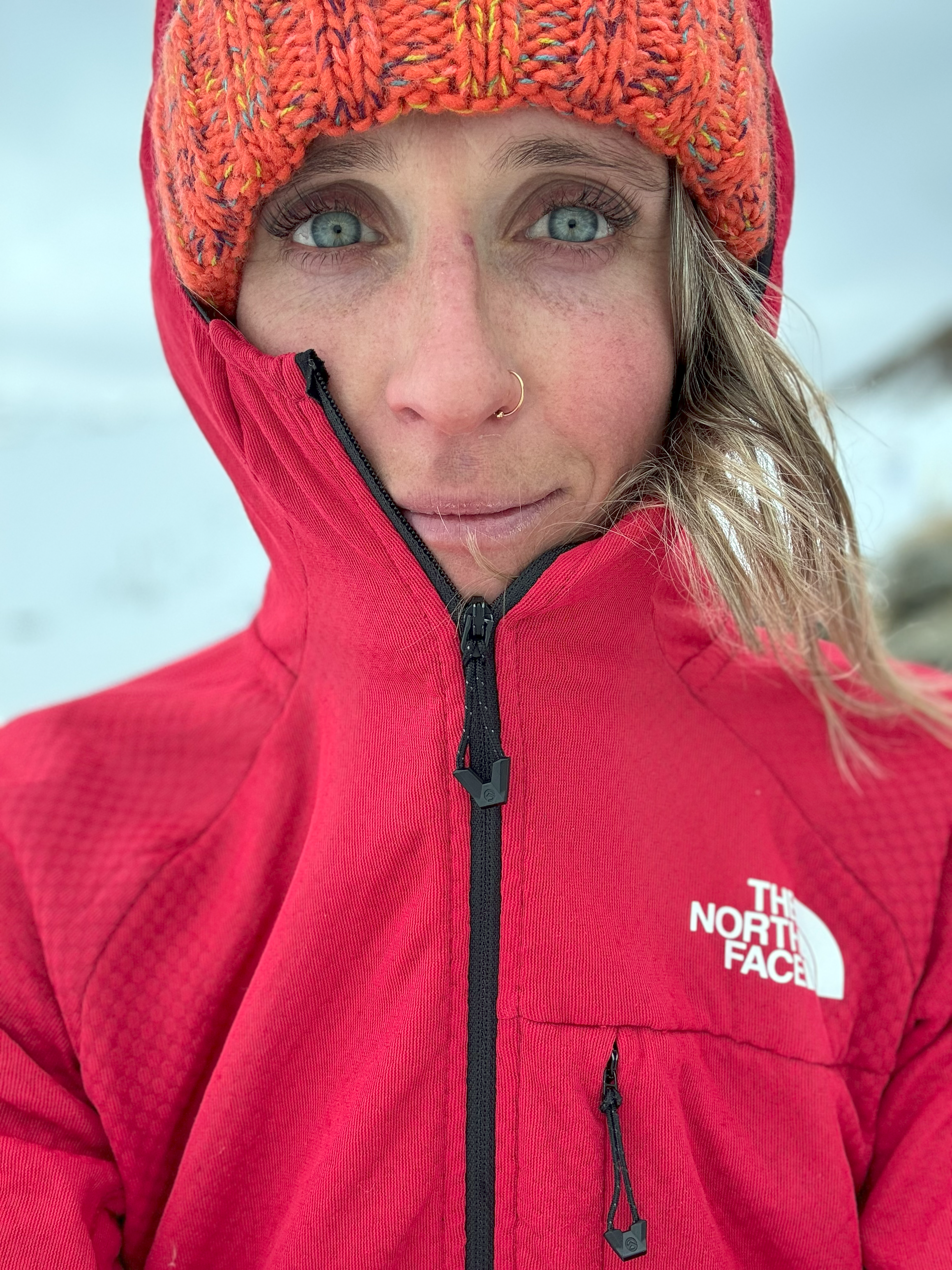
- Fay Manners in Chamonix-Mont-Blanc in February 2024

Personal information
- Nationality: British
- Born: February 1, 1987 (age 39) Bedford, Bedfordshire
- Education: BSc Information Science, Loughborough University, 2008
- Occupations: Professional athlete, predominantly Alpinism and skiing
- Height: 165 cm (5 ft 5 in)
- Weight: 58 kg (128 lb)
- Website: www.faymanners.com

Climbing career
- Type of climber: mountaineering, alpine climbing, mixed climbing, ice climbing, traditional climbing, sport climbing

Fay Manners (born 1 February 1987) is a British alpinist and skier who transitioned from a career in the technology sector to full-time mountain sports. She is a member of The North Face international athlete team and is known for her ski mountaineering and climbing projects in the Alps and internationally.

== Early life and education ==
Manners was raised in Bedford, United Kingdom and attended Dame Alice Harpur School before studying Information Science at Loughborough University, where she also played competitive field hockey.

== Career in technology ==
In 2008, Manners began her career on Unilever's IT Leadership graduate scheme, working in data-focused roles across the UK. In 2010, she relocated to New York City, where she began snowboarding and climbing recreationally.

== Transition to alpinism ==
After returning to the UK in 2014, Manners travelled and climbed across the country. In 2015, she moved to Chamonix, France, where she began training in alpinism, initially focusing on snowboarding before transitioning to skiing in 2017 to access high-altitude terrain more efficiently.

While working as a freelance data consultant, she began to undertake climbing and skiing expeditions. In 2022, Manners and climbing partner Line Van Den Berg completed an ascent of Phantom Direct on the Grandes Jorasses, reported as the first all-women ascent of the route. The climb was included in the Piolets d'Or's list of 53 Significant Ascents of 2022.

Later that year, Manners and Michelle Dvorak completed an ascent of the Cassin Ridge on Denali.

Manners has spoken publicly about encouraging greater participation by women in climbing and mountain sports and has described herself as a potential role model for younger women.

== Climbing and skiing career ==
In 2023, Manners signed with The North Face and paused her technology consulting work to focus on mountaineering and ski projects.

In May 2023, she joined Andres Marin and Iker and Eneko Pou in establishing six new climbing routes on Little Trango in Pakistan. One of the routes, Dommage pas de Fromage, was named in memory of Van Den Berg, who died in an avalanche in the Swiss Alps during the expedition.

In August 2023, Manners and Dvorak established two new climbing routes in the Mythic Cirque region of Greenland. The pair, along with Martin Feistl, climbed The Mental Breakdown, a 765-metre traditional rock route, and later completed The Princess Brides, a 370-metre route on Chastity Tower, accessed by kayak.

In November 2023, the short film Embracing the Grim was released, documenting Manners' trip to Scotland earlier that year with Van Den Berg. The film was selected for 31 international film festivals and was a finalist at the Banff Centre Mountain Film and Book Festival and the Cortomontagna - Premio Leggimontagna. It received the Best Adventure Spirit Documentary award at the International Outdoor Documentary Film Festival of China.

In January 2024, Manners and Tom Lafaille completed what is believed to be the first repeat of a steep ski line variation on the southeast face of Aiguille du Moine, originally skied in 2016. In March 2024, Manners skied three couloirs in Val d'Arpette with Noa Barrau, and later the same month skied three additional couloirs in the Miage Basin, Italy, within a 24-hour period, again with Lafaille.

In spring 2024, she completed several steep ski descents, including Épaule Salière and Le Z on the Grande Fourche, and Stratonsphérique on Aiguille d'Argentière. In May, she undertook a project titled Ride to Steep Lines, in which she cycled from Chamonix and skied three steep lines in Switzerland over 10 days, ascending each from the valley floor.

In February 2025, Manners participated in an expedition to the Turbio IV valley in Patagonia, Argentina, alongside Caro North, Belén Prados, Julia Cassou, and Rocío Guiñazú. The team established a new alpine route, Apollo 13, on El Cohete, a previously unclimbed peak. The ascent involved 13 pitches on granite up to 7b+ difficulty, followed by 650 metres of AD 4a scrambling onto a snow ridge and the summit, with a total elevation gain of approximately 1,250 metres.

In April 2025, Manners returned to the Alps and completed two new steep ski descents with partner Marco Malcangi. The first was from the summit of Becco della Pazienza in Italy, a line they named Navigando fra le spine, graded 5.3. The second was a descent from Col Maquignaz in Switzerland, named Serac Umgehung, also graded 5.3.

In June 2025, Manners and Malcangi with Diego Margiotta established two new multi-pitch traditional rock climbing routes in Italy.

In autumn 2025, Manners returned to Chaukhamba III in the Garhwal Himalaya with climbing partner Michelle Dvorak. Dvorak withdrew from the expedition due to illness, after which Manners continued to advanced base camp and completed two solo ascents of moderate ridges, later named the Asha Traverse and the Anamika Traverse.

In late 2025, Manners undertook climbing trips in the Middle East and North Africa. In November, she established a new 405-metre multi-pitch sandstone route in Jordan with Nicole Berthod, named Mukatila. In December, she travelled to Morocco, where she partnered with Solenne Piret to establish a new bolted route near Zaouia, close to the Taghia region, named Win Oumalou.

== Recent activity ==
At the beginning of 2026, Manners completed the first ascent of a new mixed climbing route on Tête aux Chamois in Switzerland. The route, named Elles Aussi, was established while partnered with Melanie Grünwald. The ascent was notable as the first route opened in the area by an all-female team and their climb received coverage on Swiss television and was presented as an effort to encourage greater female participation in mountain sports.

Returning to Switzerland in March 2026, Manners opened Nostalgie Alpine, a 325m ascent on Roc Noir with Marco Malcangi and Max Kilcoyne. Lacrux magazine noted Manners for being one of the few female first ascensionists actively opening new routes.

In April 2026, Manners completed La Muse du Trient (M7+) on Tête de Biselx, completing a series of three mixed climbing first ascents established in different regions of the Swiss Alps during the 2025-26 winter season. The routes were collectively referred to as the "Winter Mixed Trilogy" and received coverage in alpine climbing media, including Alpin magazine, which discussed its significance within contemporary women's mountaineering.

On 28 May 2026, Manners and Marco Malcangi completed a new ski line on Nevado Ranrapalca (6,162 m) in Peru's Cordillera Blanca. The pair ascended via the mountain's southwest ridge and descended through the col between Ranrapalca and Ocshapalca before skiing a 900-metre, 5.1 E3 line, which they named Acceso Momentáneo.

In June 2026, Manners and Mathilde Badoual completed a new alpine route on the northwest face of Nordend in the Monte Rosa massif. The line, was mapped by Manners over the prior 12 months to correspond with the present morphology of the face rather than the configuration encountered during the historic routes established more than fifty years earlier.

In August 2026, Manners and Roger Schäli established Solar Eclipse, a 33-pitch climbing route on the north face of the Eiger in Switzerland. She became the first British woman to establish a new route on the mountain.

== Setbacks and challenges ==
In October 2024, Manners and Michelle Dvorak became the focus of a three-day search and rescue operation while attempting to climb Chaukhamba III in India. The team reportedly lost key equipment and supplies partway through the ascent, resulting in a call for emergency assistance. The incident received attention from both media and the international climbing community. While no injuries were reported, it highlighted the logistical challenges of remote Himalayan expeditions.

As with many alpinists, not all of Manners' objectives have resulted in successful ascents. She has retreated from routes due to conditions, including poor weather and avalanche risk as well as illness, although specific instances have not always been formally recorded.

== Notable ascents and descents ==
The following table lists selected ski descents and alpine ascents by Manners since 2023. Ski grades follow the Toponeige steep skiing rating system.

Date commenced	Ascent/ Descent	Country	Mountain	Route/Descent	Grade	Length	Partner(s)
23 March 2023	Ascent	Norway	Grytetippen	How Not To	M5	250m	Freja Shannon
22 May 2023	Ascent	Pakistan	Little Trango	Dommage pas de Fromage	6c	250m	Eneko Pou, Iker Pou, Andres Marin
29 May 2023	Ascent	Pakistan	The Lady	The Pretty, The Bad and The Ugly	7a	230m	Eneko Pou, Iker Pou
4 June 2023	Ascent	Pakistan	The Lady	The Prime Minister	6c	205m	Eneko Pou, Iker Pou
10 June 2023	Ascent	Pakistan	The Gentleman	More than an Addiction	6b	235m	Iker Pou
12 June 2023	Ascent	Pakistan	Trango II	Waa Shakir	M5 6b	2,200m	Eneko Pou, Iker Pou
17 June 2023	Ascent	Pakistan	The Lady Fay	Always Elurra	7a+	260m	Eneko Pou, Iker Pou
17 August 2023	Ascent	Greenland	Ataatap Tower	The Mental Breakdown	7b+	765m	Michelle Dvorak, Martin Feistl
22 August 2023	Ascent	Greenland	Chastity Tower	The Princess Brides	6c+	370m	Michelle Dvorak
17 February 2024	Descent	France	Aiguille d'Argentiére	Stratonsphérique	5.3 E3	1,000m	Tom Lafaille
12 April 2024	Descent	Switzerland	L'Epaule de la Tour Salière	North East Ramp	5.3 E3	1,000m	Anna Taylor
12 May 2024	Descent	France	Grande Forche	Le Z	5.3 E3	300m	Benjamin Ramos
17 June 2024	Descent	Italy	Mont Blanc West Face	Pierre Tardival Variation	5.2 E3	1,000m	Ross Hewitt
26 November 2024	Ascent	Morocco	Dutronc Buttress	Les Cactus à Dutronc	E2 5c	190m	Daniel Coquoz
27 November 2024	Ascent	Morocco	Dutronc Buttress	Traversée Amoureuse	E5 6b	100m	Daniel Coquoz
29 November 2024	Ascent	Morocco	La Scéne du Belvédère	Promenade Aventureuse	VS 4c	330m	Daniel Coquoz
30 November 2024	Ascent	Morocco	Teapot Crag	Tea, Climb, Repeat	E3 5b	130m	Daniel Coquoz
17 January 2025	Ascent	Argentina	El Cohete	Apollo 13	7b+	1,250m	Caro North, Belen Prados, Julia Cassou, Rocio Guiñazu
26 April 2025	Descent	Italy	Becco Della Pazienza	Navigando fra le Spine	5.3 E4	450m	Marco Malcangi
2 May 2025	Descent	Switzerland	Col Maquignaz	Serac Umgehung	5.2 E3	750m	Marco Malcangi
28 June 2025	Ascent	Italy	Testa Paiaire	Un Ultimo Passo	6c	415m	Marco Malcangi, Diego Margiotta
29 June 2025	Ascent	Italy	Gran Bernardé	Fragile Belleza	6c	245m	Marco Malcangi, Diego Margiotta
5 September 2025	Ascent	Italy	Corno Grande	Eppure Siamo Andati	7a A0	450m	Marco Malcangi
18 October 2025	Ascent	India	Panpatia Cirque	Asha Traverse	AD 5a		Solo
20 October 2025	Ascent	India	Panpatia Cirque	Anamika Traverse	AD 4c		Solo
8 November 2025	Ascent	Jordan	Nassrani South	Mukatila	6a A0	405m	Nicole Berthod
4 December 2025	Ascent	Morocco	Jebel Inslif	Win Oumalou	7a	185m	Solenne Piret
21 January 2026	Ascent	Switzerland	Tête aux Chamois	Elles Aussi	M7+ A0	135m	Melanie Grünwald
3 March 2026	Ascent	Switzerland	Roc Noir	Nostalgie Alpine	M8 A0	325m	Marco Malcangi, Max Kilcoyne
28 May 2026	Descent	Peru	Nevado Ranrapalca	Acceso Momentáneo	5.1 E3	900m	Marco Malcangi
15 June 2026	Ascent	Switzerland	Nordend	Neue Ära	6c ED+	1,308m	Mathilde Badoual
27 July 2026	Ascent	Switzerland	Eiger	Solar Eclipse	7c Prov	900m	Roger Schäli
