= Maki Yūkō =

Japanese mountain climber

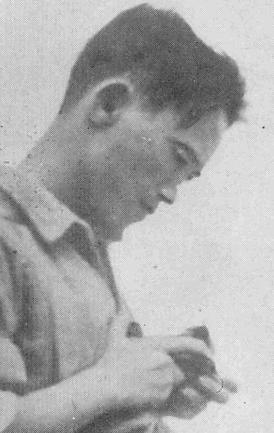
- Born: Maki Aritsune; 5 February 1894; Sendai, Japan
- Died: 2 May 1989 (aged 95); Tokyo, Japan
- Education: Keio University Faculty of Law
- Occupation: Mountaineer

Maki Yūkō (槇 有恒, Maki Yūkō; 5 February 1894 – 2 May 1989), also known as Maki Aritsune (using the native Japanese reading of the characters of his given name;Yūkō is the Sino-Japanese reading), was a Japanese mountain climber. He was born in Sendai and died in Tokyo.

== Early life and education ==
Maki climbed Mount Fuji at the age of ten and made many climbs in his teens, including Mount Aso. He established a climbing club while studying law at Keio University in Tokyo, from which he graduated in 1919. He continued his studies in the United States and Great Britain.

== Climbing career ==
During the period 1919 to 1921, he made numerous climbs in Switzerland, and on 10 September 1921, he made the first ascent of the Eiger by the Mittellegigrat (northeast ridge) with mountain guides Fritz Amatter, Samuel Brawand and Fritz Steuri.

He made a donation of 10,000 Swiss francs toward the construction of the Mittellegi Hut.

In 1922, he made the first winter ascent of Mount Yari (3,180 metres (10,430 ft)) in Japan. In 1925, with five other Japanese mountaineers and three Swiss mountain guides, he made the first ascent of Mount Alberta (3,619 metres (11,873 ft)) in the Canadian Rockies. The expedition was sponsored by Prince Chichibu.

In 1926, he was again in the Alps, making the ascent of the Matterhorn via the Zmuttgrat, and climbing with Prince Chichibu.

Maki's climbing career was interrupted by World War II, preventing him from leading a Japanese expedition to the Himalayas. In 1956, Maki led the third Japanese expedition to the Nepalese mountain Manaslu, where expedition members Toshio Imanishi and Sherpa Gyalzen Norbu made the first ascent of Manaslu on 9 May 1956.

== Publications ==
- Maki, Yuko; Imanishi, T. (1957). "The ascent of Manaslu". Himalayan Journal (20).
- Maki, Aritsune (1956). The ascent of Manaslu. Tokyo: Mainichi.
- Maki, Aritsune, ed. (1957). Manaslu: For Boys and Girls. Tokyo: Mainichi.
