= Brandegg railway station =

Railway station in Bern, Switzerland

Brandegg
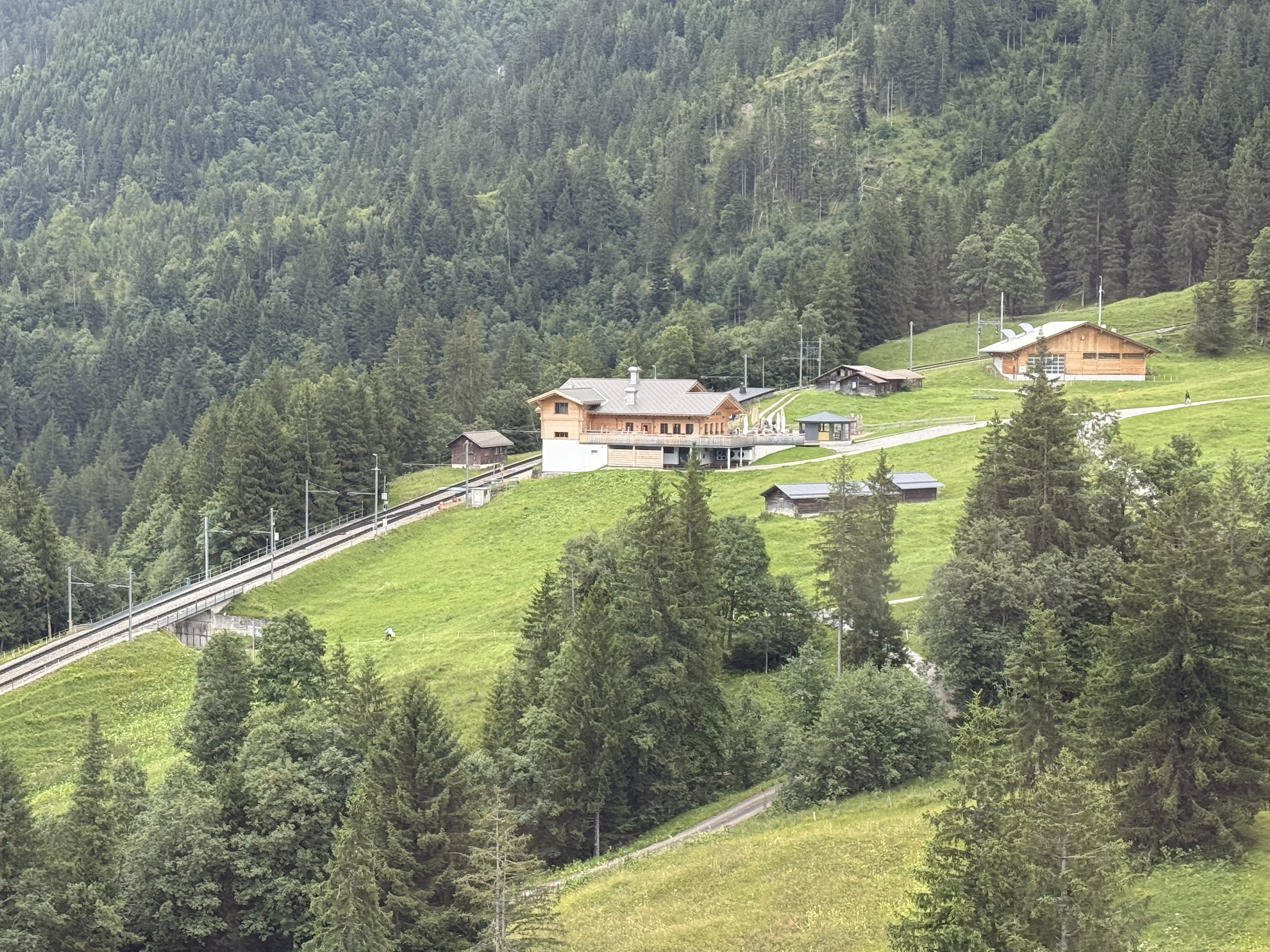

General information
- Location: Brandegg; Grindelwald, Bern; Switzerland
- Coordinates: 46°36′23″N 08°00′37″E
- Elevation: 1,333 m (4,373 ft)
- Lines: Berner Oberland Bahn; Wengernalpbahn

Services
Preceding station	Jungfraubahn AG	Following station
Grindelwald Grund towards Grindelwald	Wengernalp Railway	Alpiglen towards Kleine Scheidegg
Location
- Location within Switzerland

Brandegg is a request stop railway station in the municipality of Grindelwald in the Swiss canton of Bern. The station is served by the Wengernalpbahn (WAB), whose trains operate from Grindelwald to Kleine Scheidegg.

The guide books state that the station buffet serves the best apple fritters in the world. There is an official Apple Fritter Walk - Der Öpfelchüechliweg. The station is served by the following passenger trains:

Operator	Train Type	Route	Typical Frequency	Notes
Wengernalpbahn		Grindelwald - Grindelwald Grund - Brandegg - Alpiglen - Kleine Scheidegg	2 per hour	
