= Samuel Brawand =

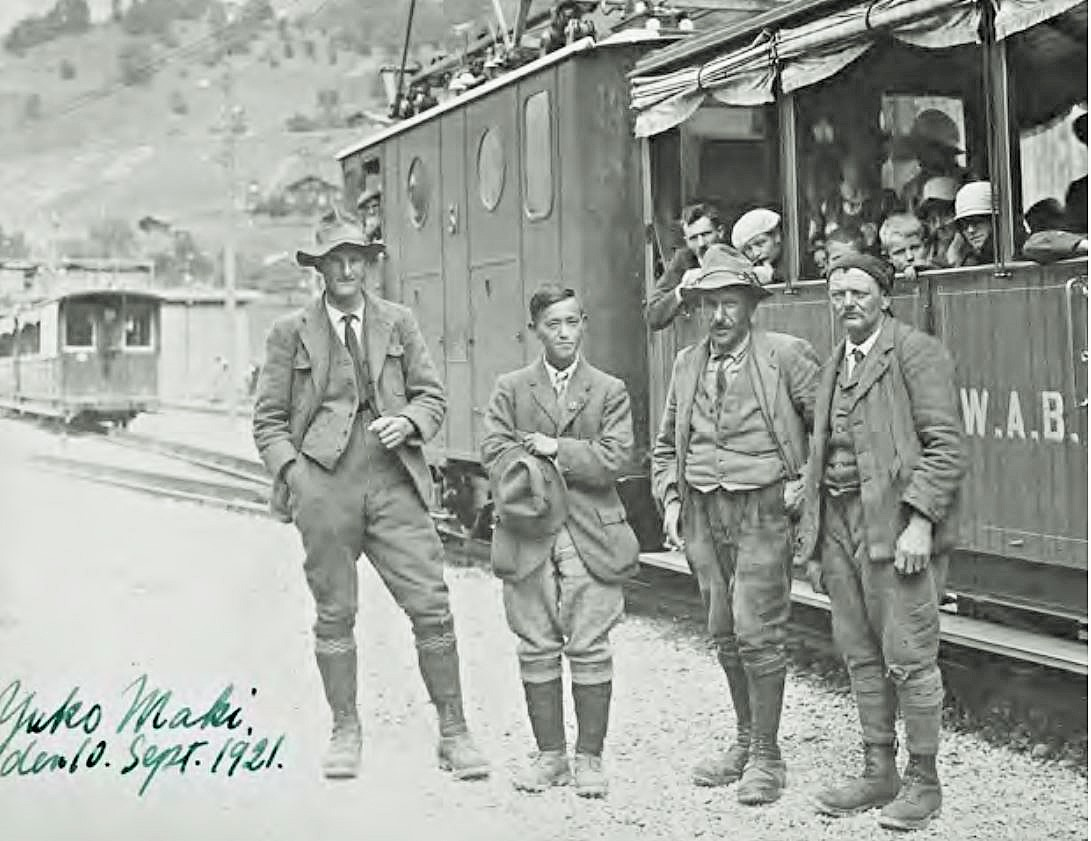

Samuel Brawand (born 18 May 1898 in Grindelwald, Switzerland, died 11 July 2001 in Grindelwald) was a Swiss politician (SP) and mountaineer.

== Life ==
Brawand, who came from a modest background, lost his father, a mountain guide, at the age of four when he was killed by lightning at the top of the Wetterhorn. After Brawand had graduated from the Lehrerseminar (school for teachers) in Hofwil, he worked as a primary school teacher, a small farmer, rancher and cattle breeder, and very intensively as a guide, especially for climbers from Japan. As a mountaineer, he made a name for himself with the first ascent of the Mittellegigrat (the northeast ridge of the Eiger) on 10 September 1921, serving as guide for Maki Yūkō along with fellow guides Fritz Amatter and Fritz Steuri.

Brawand's first political position was a Gemeinderat (municipal council) seat held in Grindelwald. From 1933 to 1935 he belonged to the Grand Council of Bern and from 1935 to 1947 to the National Council (the second chamber of the Federal Assembly). During World War II Brawand presided over the Begnadigungskommission (Clemency Commission) of the National Council. From 1947 to 1962, Brawand was a member of the Conseil d'Etat of the Canton of Bern and headed the governing body for building and railway management. From 1950 to 1951 and from 1961 to 1962 he was President of the Conseil d'Etat (i.e. head of government) of Bern.

From July 1962 to June 1968 Brawand was director of the Bern-Lötschberg-Simplon railway (BLS). From 1955 to 1967 he again served in the National Council. As chairman of the Federal Road Commission Brawand played an important role in the modernization and expansion of roads in Switzerland, including the creation of the Swiss freeways. Brawand served on the administrative boards of several railway companies, was a member of the Internationalen Simplonkommission (International Simplon Commission) and President of Kraftwerke Oberhasli.

On 2 December 1961 Brawand was made an honorary citizen of his home town of Grindelwald. In 1962 he was honored by the University of Bern with an honorary doctorate. Brawand gained fame as a writer and as a scholar of the Grindelwald dialect. He died in Grindelwald on 11 July 2001 at the age of 103.
