= Grindelwald Grund railway station =

Railway station in canton of Bern, Switzerland

Grindelwald Grund
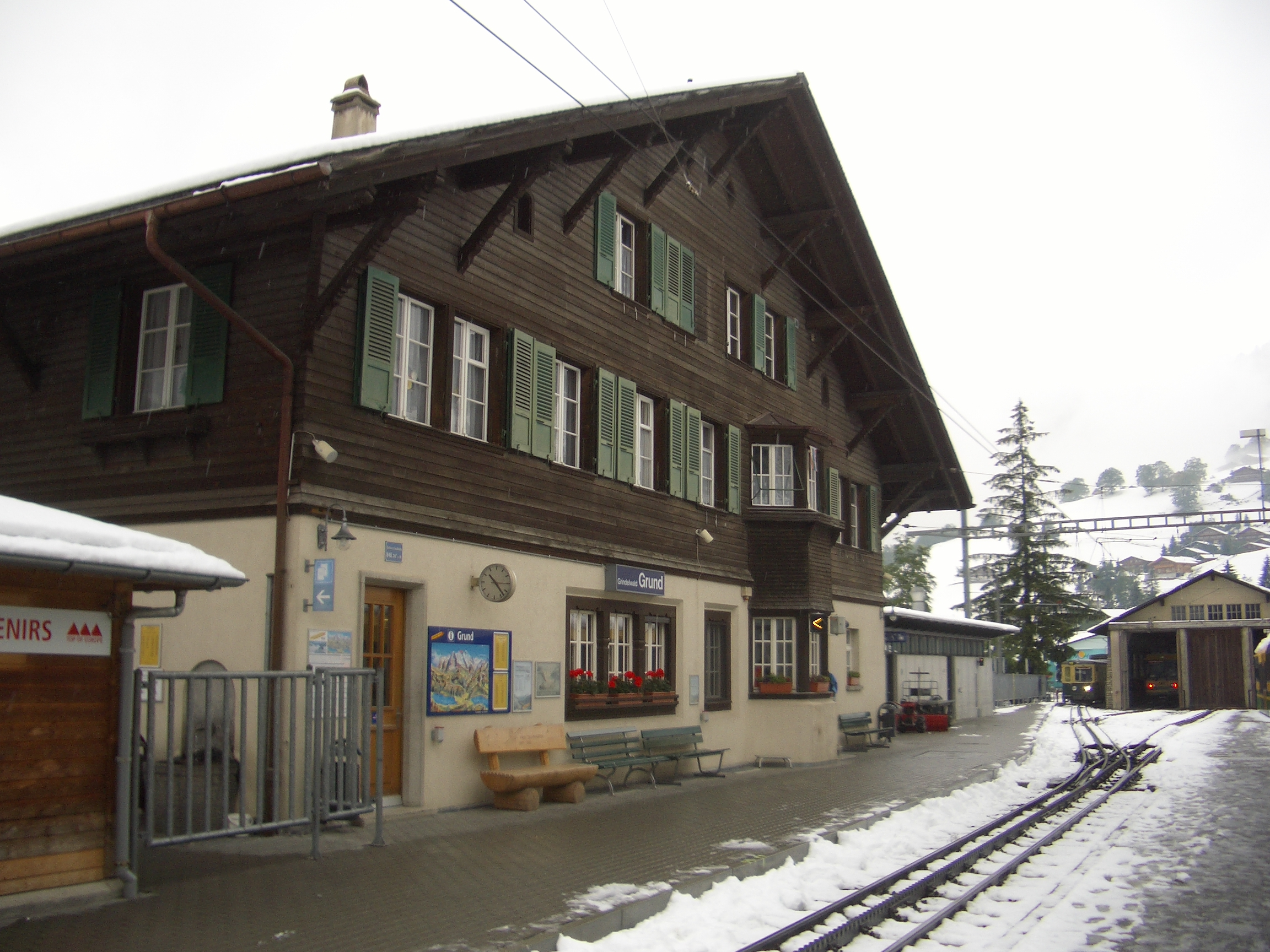
- station building in 2007

General information
- Location: Grundstrasse; Grindelwald, Bern; Switzerland
- Coordinates: 46°37′22″N 08°01′24″E
- Elevation: 944 m (3,097 ft)
- Lines: Berner Oberland Bahn; Wengernalpbahn

History
- Opened: 1893
- Electrified: 24 June 1910

Services
Preceding station	Jungfraubahn AG	Following station
Grindelwald Terminus	Wengernalp Railway	Brandegg towards Kleine Scheidegg
Location
- Location within Switzerland

Grindelwald Grund is a railway station in the village and municipality of Grindelwald in the Swiss canton of Bern. The station is served by the Wengernalpbahn (WAB), whose trains operate from Grindelwald to Kleine Scheidegg. It takes its name from the Grund area of the village, in which it is located.

WAB trains commence their journey at Grindelwald station, where they connect with trains of the Berner Oberland Bahn from Interlaken, and initially descend steeply to Grindelwald Grund station. At Grindelwald Grund they reverse and commence their ascent to Kleine Scheidegg, entering and leaving the station by its southern end. Depots and workshops are situated at both ends of the station.

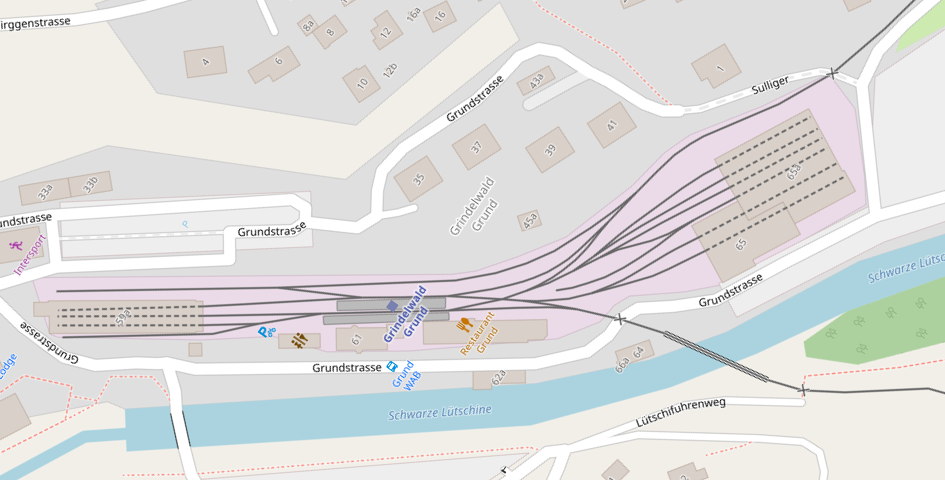
Map of the station

== History ==
The station was opened in 1893. In 1925 the carriage shed at Grindelwald Grund was adapted increasing the length to 40 metres (130 ft) to accommodate new rolling stock. The station building at Grindelwald Grund was rebuilt in 1939. The station restaurant was built in 1980 and at the same time heated waiting rooms were provided.

== Services ==
The station is served by the following passenger trains:

Operator	Train Type	Route	Typical Frequency	Notes
Wengernalpbahn		Grindelwald - Grindelwald Grund - Brandegg - Alpiglen - Kleine Scheidegg	2 per hour	

The station is surrounded by extensive car parking, and is the principal starting point of a journey to Kleine Scheidegg, and onward to the Jungfraujoch, for passengers arriving in Grindelwald by car. It is also the connection to the Grindelwald–Männlichen gondola cableway.

== Gallery ==
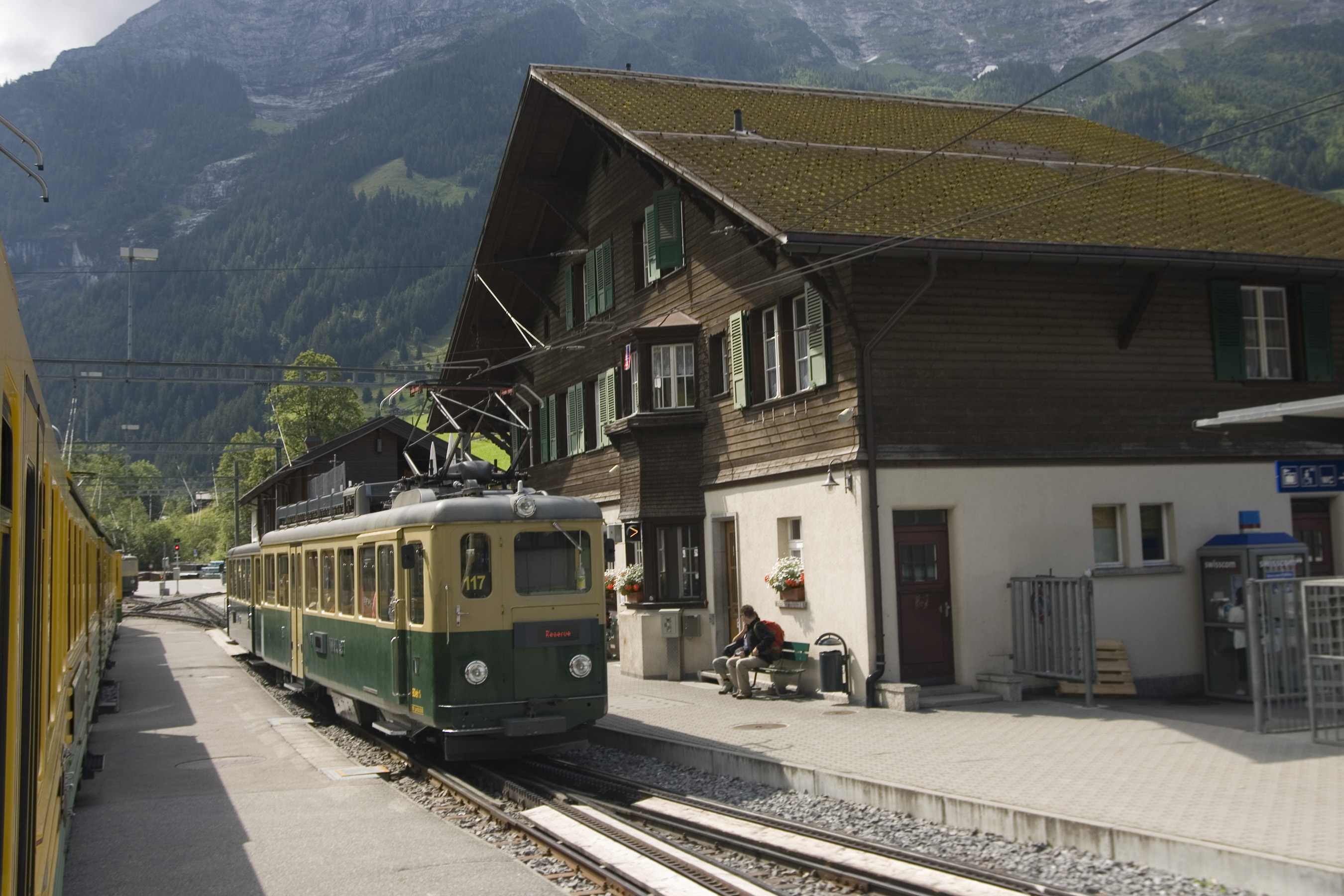
station building in 2008

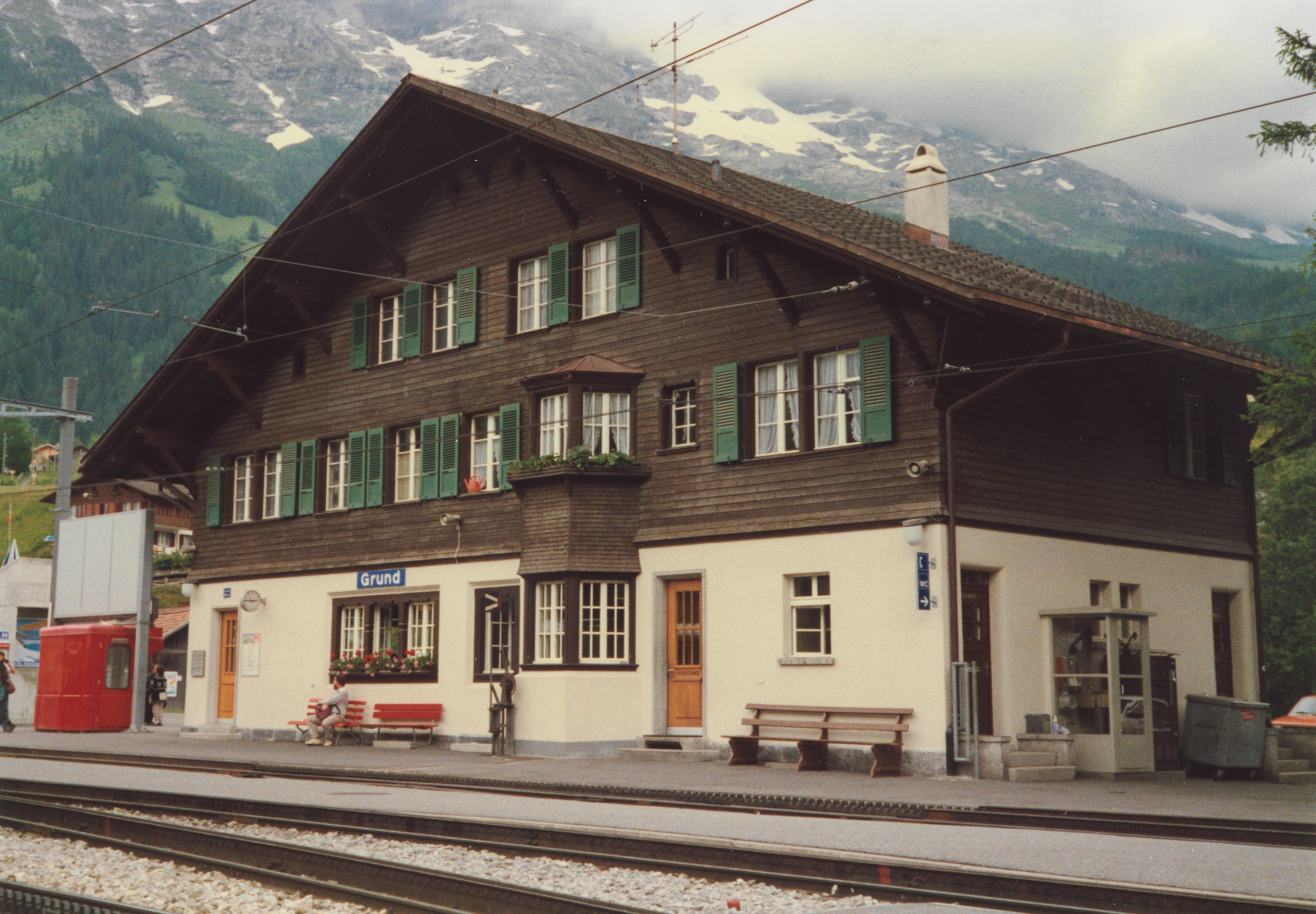
station building in 1988

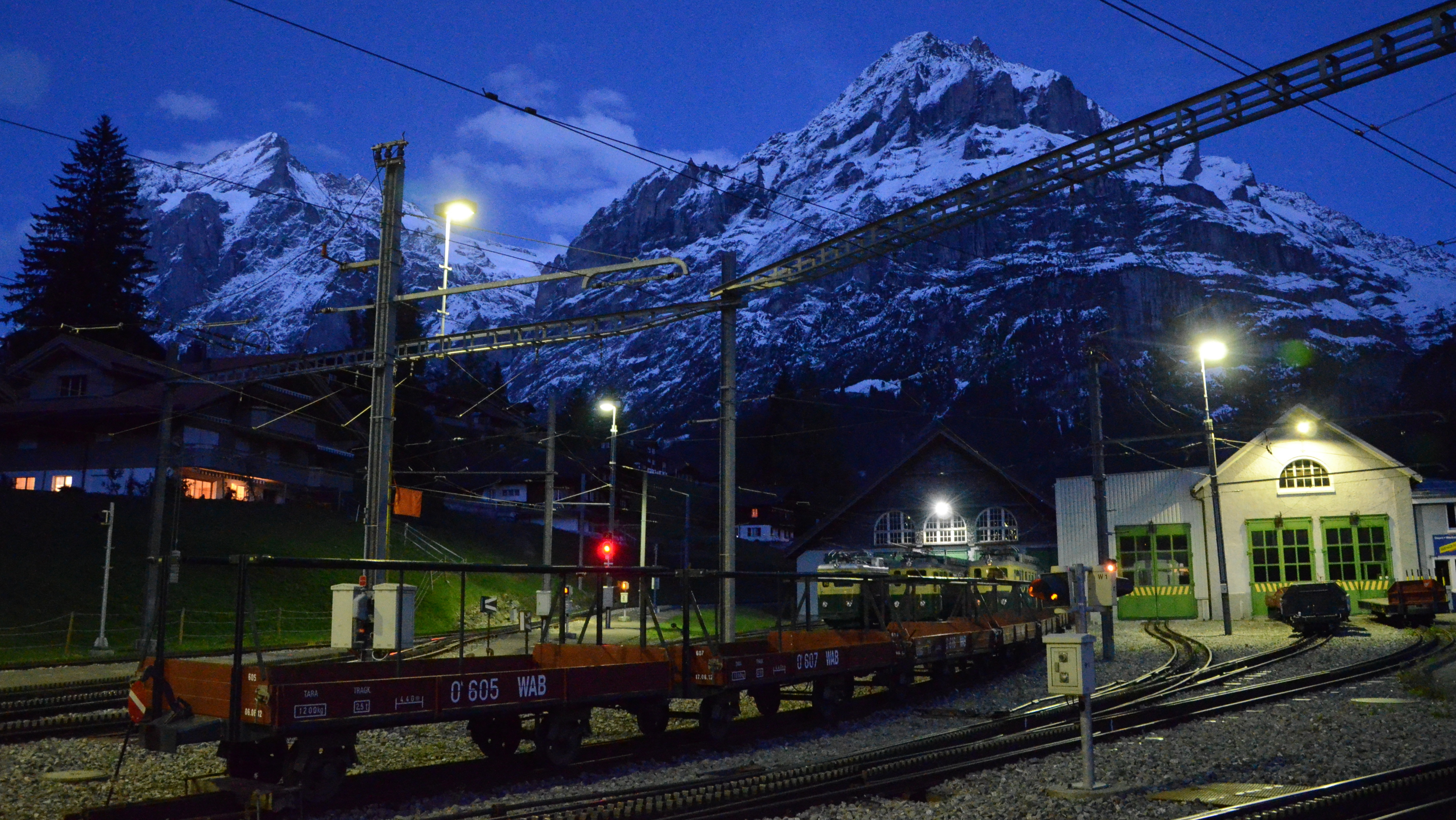
depot in 2013

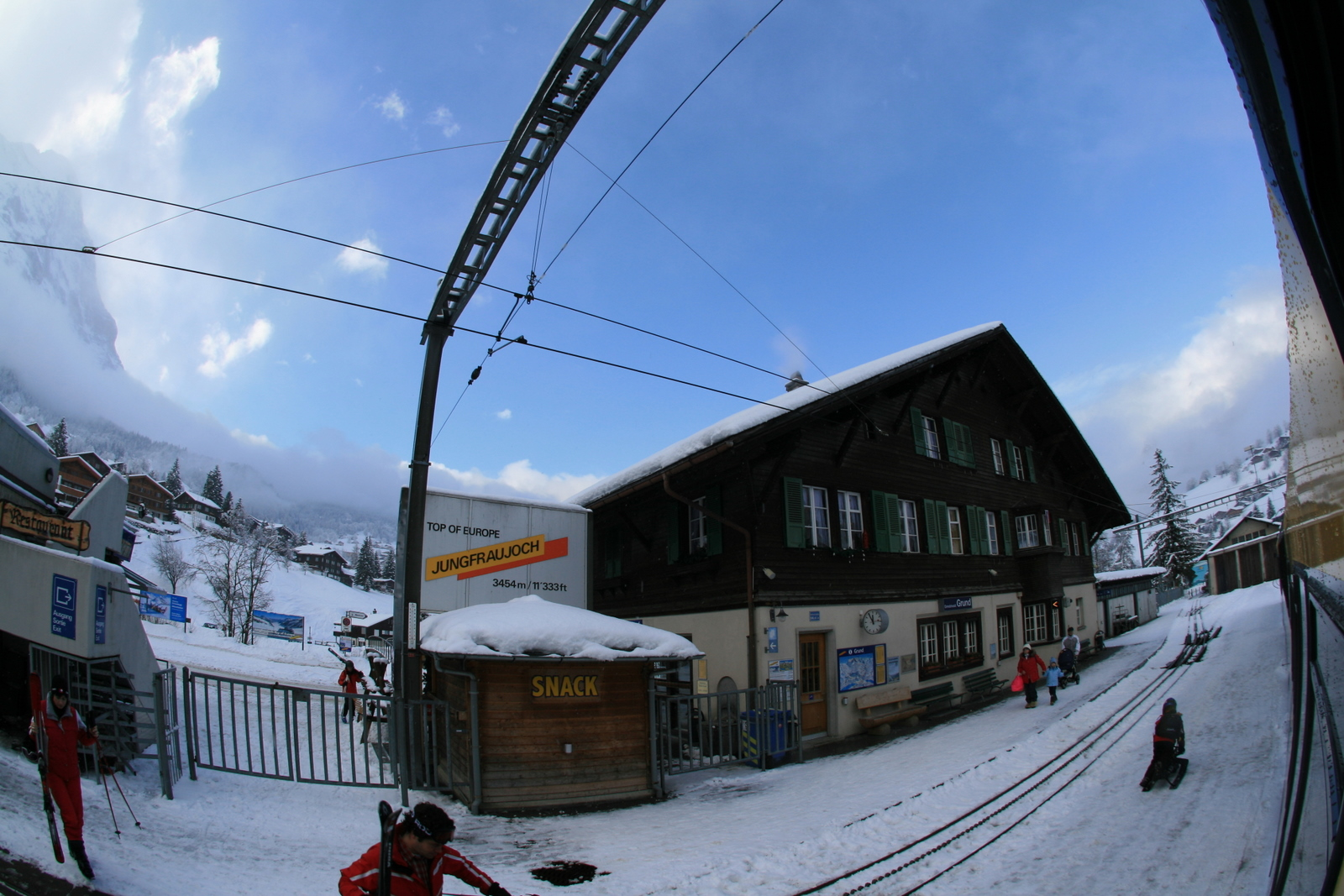
winter view in 2009
