= Grande Fourche =

Mountain in Switzerland

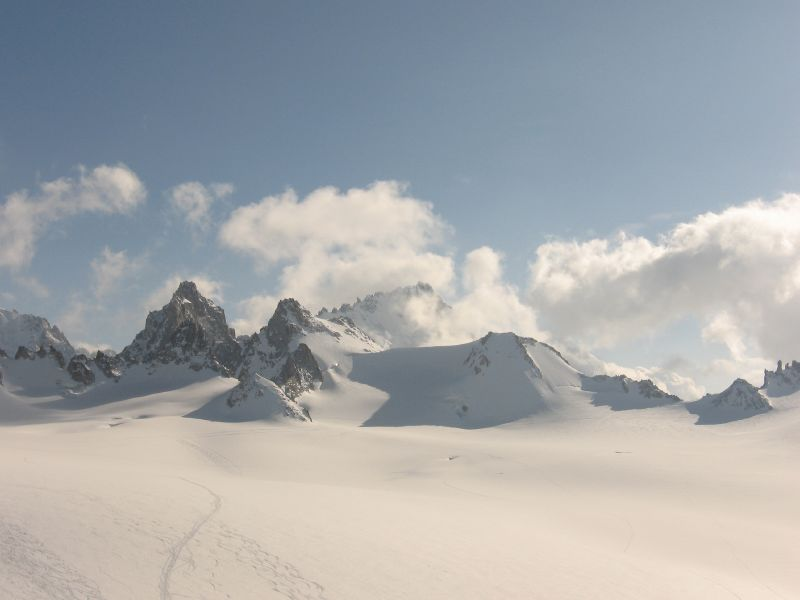
- Grande Fourche (left peak) from the Plateau du Trient

Highest point
- Elevation: 3,610 m (11,840 ft)
- Prominence: 275 m (902 ft)
- Parent peak: Aiguille du Chardonnet
- Coordinates: 45°58′34.7″N 7°01′16.1″E

Geography
- Location within Alps
- Location: Valais, Switzerland; Haute-Savoie, France
- Parent range: Mont Blanc Massif

The Grande Fourche is a mountain in the Mont Blanc Massif, located on the Swiss-French border. It lies between the Glacier de Saleina (Valais) and the Glacier du Tour (Haute-Savoie).
