= Mittellegi Hut =

Mountain hut in the Swiss Alps

Coordinates: 46°35′00″N 8°01′21″E

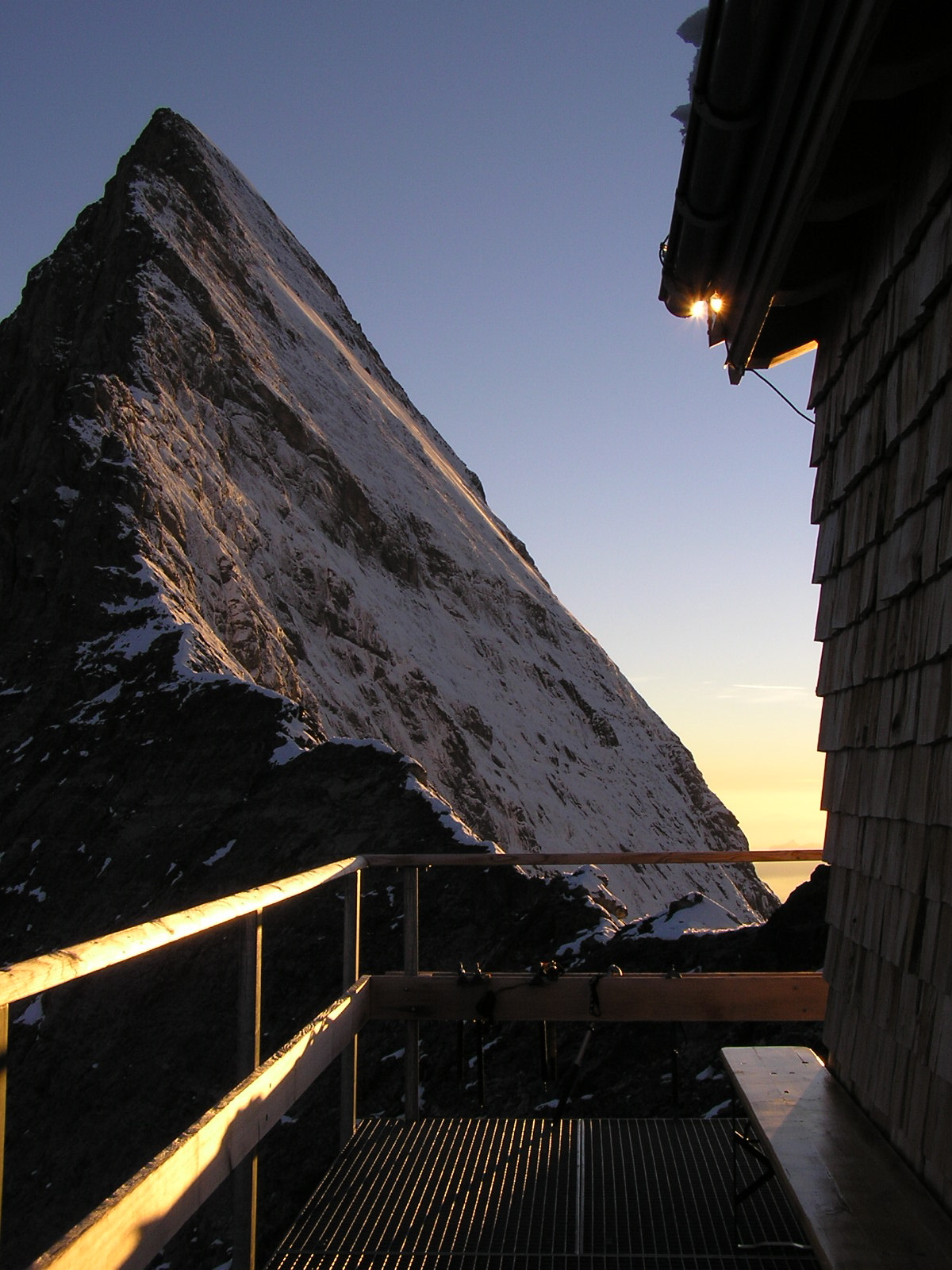
View of the Eiger from the hut

The Mittellegi Hut (German: Mittellegihütte) (3,355 m) is a mountain hut in the Swiss Alps, located on the Mittellegi ridge of the Eiger above Grindelwald. It is the highest mountain hut in the canton of Bern. Its construction was funded by Maki Yūkō, a Japanese climber, in 1924 as a memorial of his world first climb to the Eiger.

== See also ==
- List of buildings and structures above 3000 m in Switzerland
