= Tschuggen (Wengen) =

Mountain in Switzerland

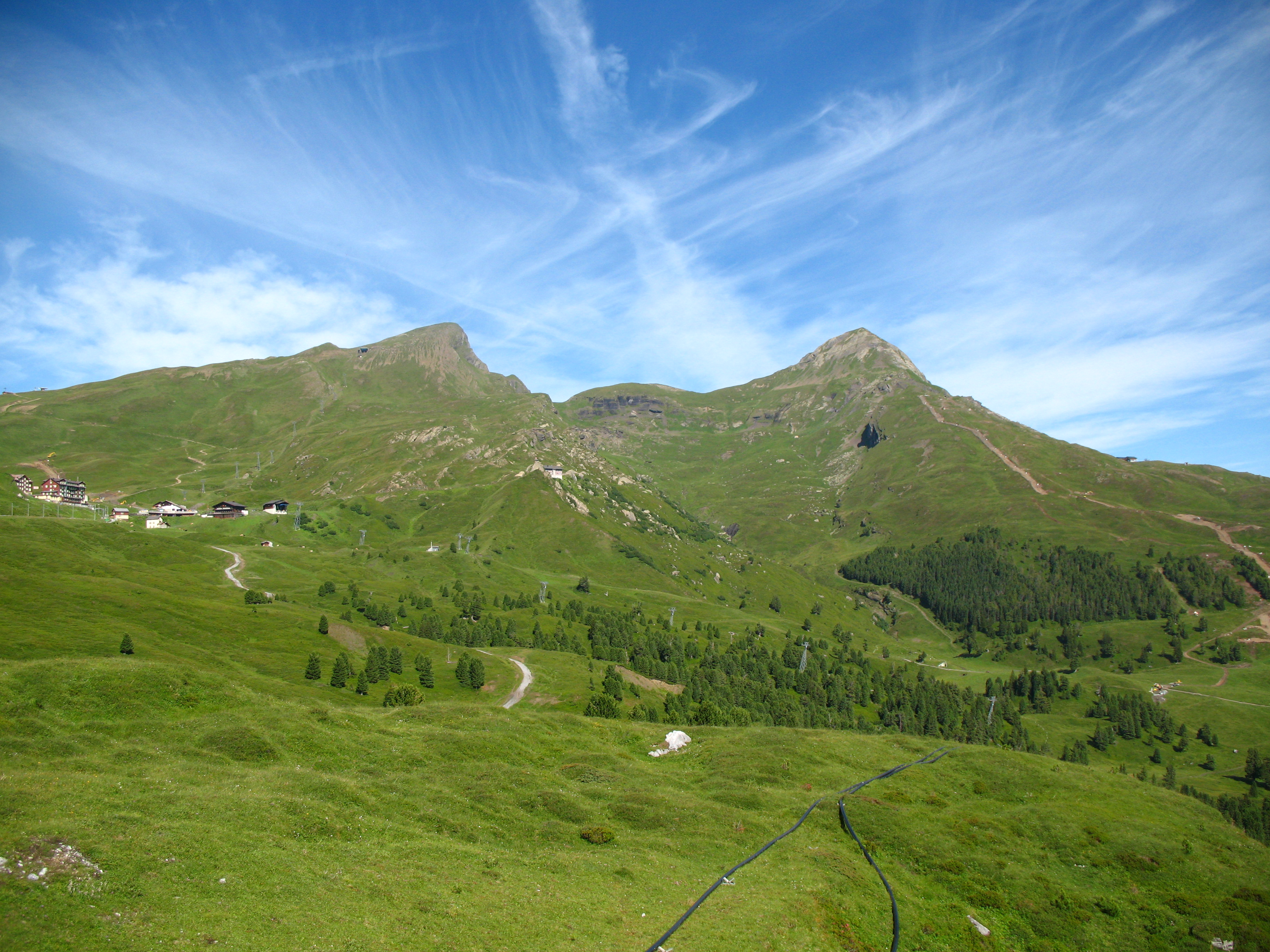
- The Lauberhorn (left) and the Tschuggen (right)

Highest point
- Elevation: 2,521 m (8,271 ft)
- Prominence: 460 m (1,510 ft)
- Parent peak: Finsteraarhorn
- Coordinates: 46°36′0.9″N 7°56′58.2″E

Geography
- Location within Switzerland
- Location: Bern, Switzerland
- Parent range: Bernese Alps

The Tschuggen is a mountain of the Bernese Alps, overlooking Wengen in the Bernese Oberland. It has an elevation of 2,521 metres above sea level and it is the highest summit of the group lying north of the Kleine Scheidegg.
