= Alpiglen railway station =

Railway station in canton of Bern, Switzerland

Alpiglen
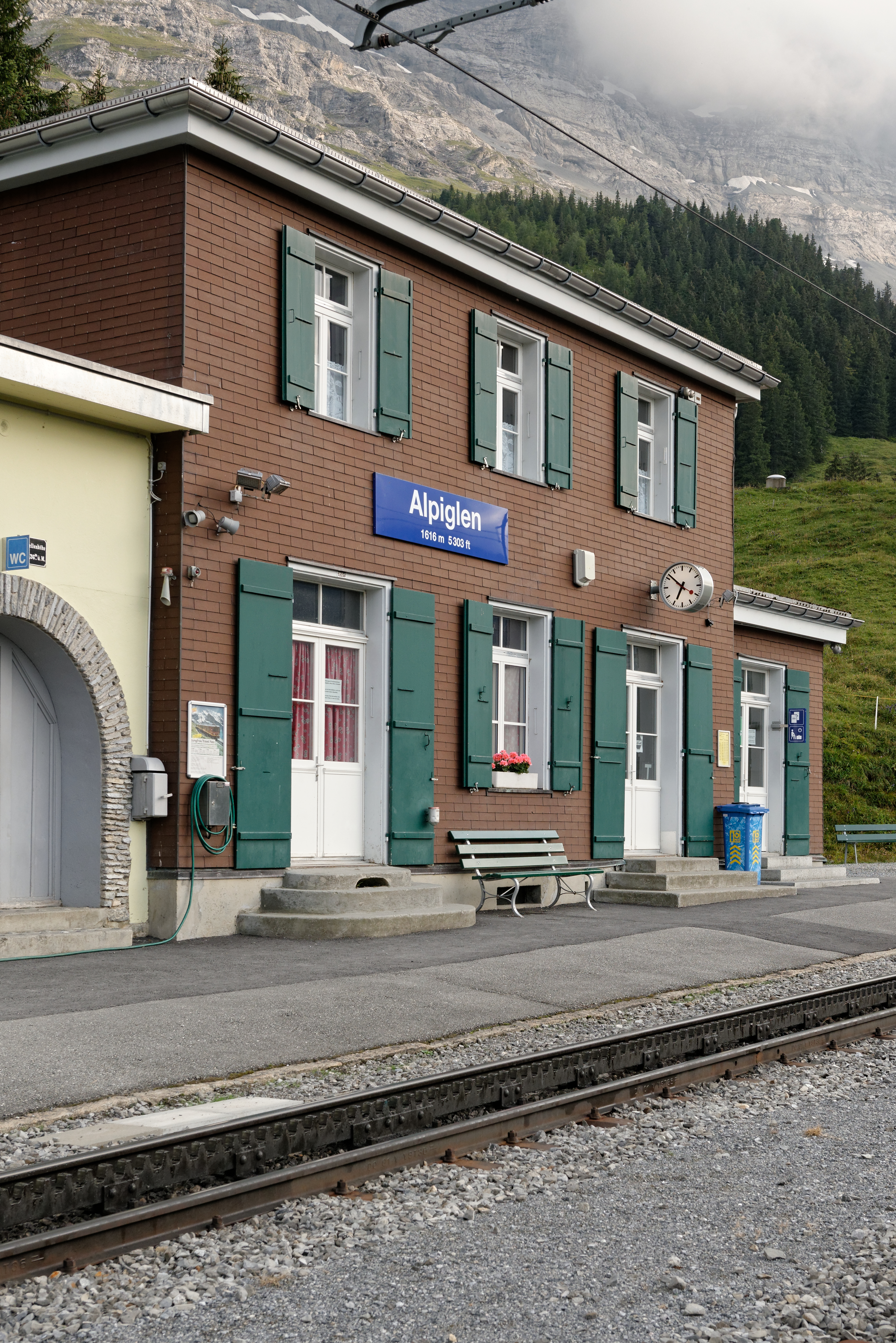
- station building (2016)

General information
- Location: Alpiglen; Grindelwald, Bern; Switzerland
- Coordinates: 46°35′33″N 07°59′29″E
- Elevation: 1,616 m (5,302 ft)
- Lines: Berner Oberland Bahn; Wengernalpbahn

Services
Preceding station	Jungfraubahn AG	Following station
Brandegg towards Grindelwald	Wengernalp Railway	Kleine Scheidegg Terminus
Location
- Location within Switzerland

Alpiglen is a request stop railway station in the municipality of Grindelwald in the Swiss canton of Bern. The station is served by the Wengernalpbahn (WAB), whose trains operate from Grindelwald to Kleine Scheidegg. It takes its name from the nearby settlement of Alpiglen.

The station is served by the following passenger trains:

Operator	Train Type	Route	Typical Frequency	Notes
Wengernalpbahn		Grindelwald - Grindelwald Grund - Brandegg - Alpiglen - Kleine Scheidegg	2 per hour	

== Gallery ==
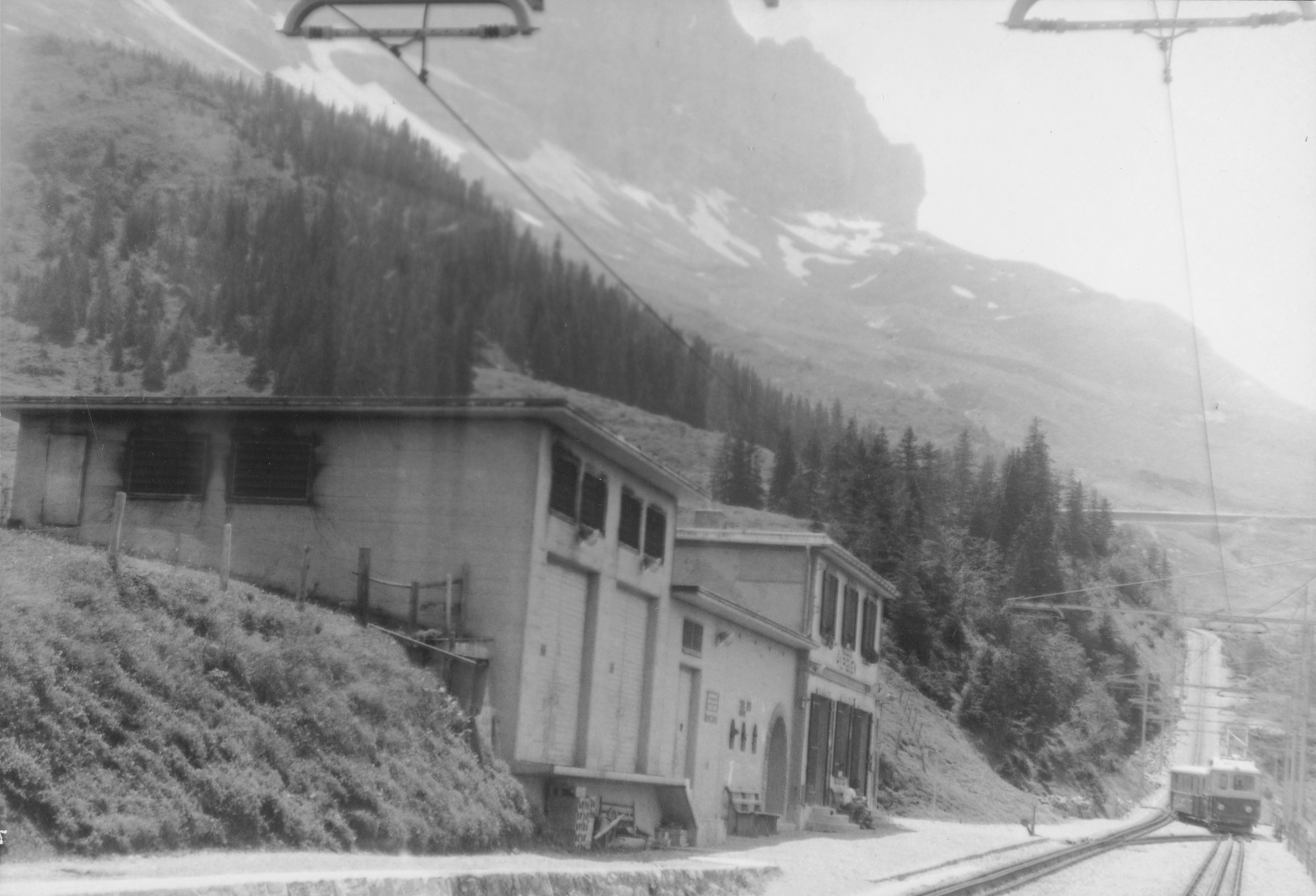
station (1976)

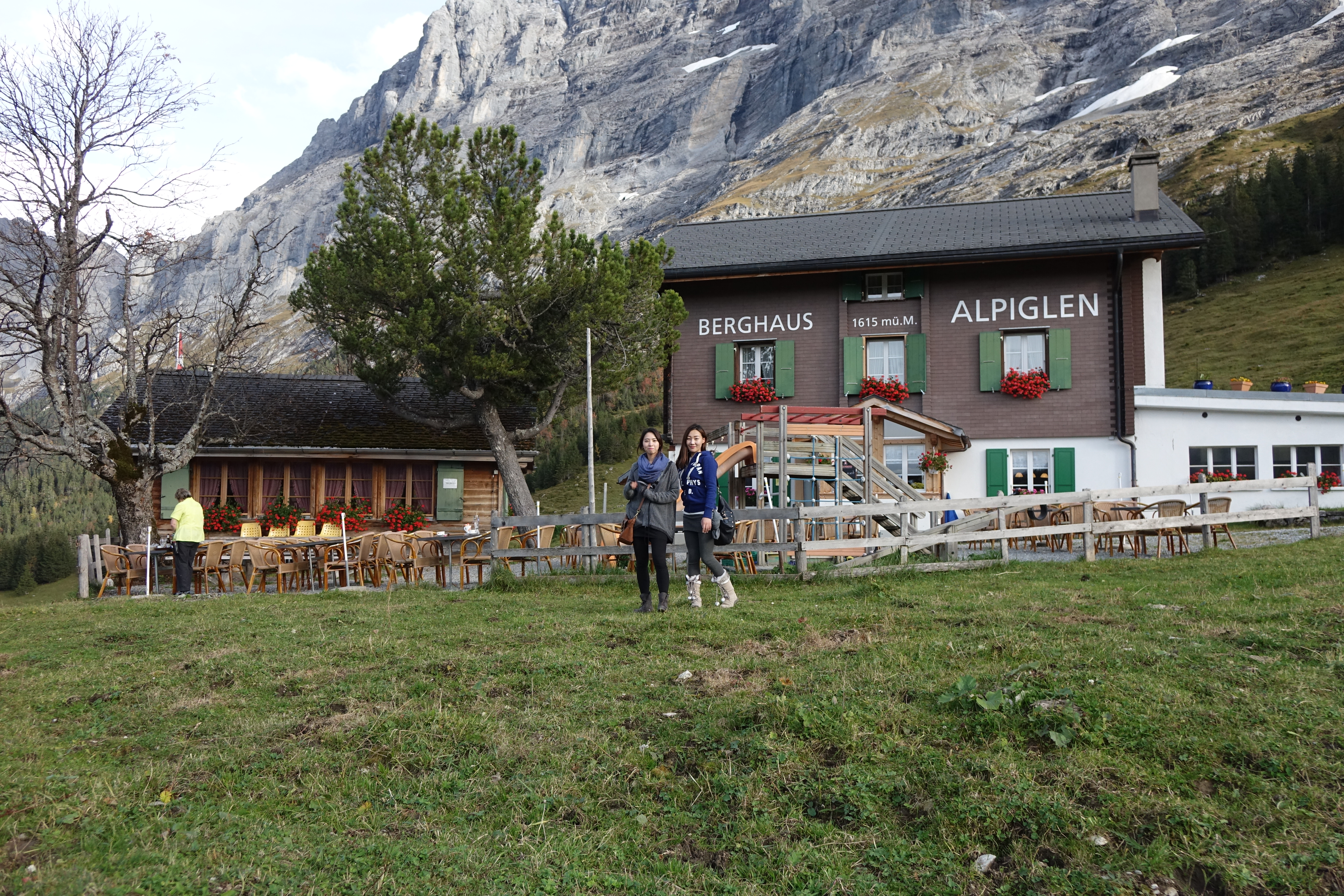
station building, backside (2014)
