= Inga Cadranel =

Canadian actress

- Born: April 30, 1978 (age 48); Toronto, Ontario, Canada
- Occupation: Actress
- Years active: 2000–present
- Spouse: Gabriel Hogan
- Children: 1
- Family: Susan Hogan (mother-in-law); Michael Hogan (father-in-law)

Inga Cadranel (born April 30, 1978) is a Canadian film and television actress. She is best known for playing the roles of Brooke Fairburn on The Eleventh Hour, Liz Santerra on Jeff Ltd., Francesca on Rent-a-Goalie, Aife on Lost Girl, Detective Angela "Angie" Deangelis on Orphan Black, and Lorraine "Harmony" Miller on General Hospital.

== Early life ==
Cadranel was born in Toronto, Ontario, Canada. Her mother is Maja Ardal and her father is Jeff Braunstein.

== Career ==
Cadranel has starred in a number of Canadian television shows since the 2000s. She was a regular cast member of The Eleventh Hour, Jeff Ltd., Rent-a-Goalie, and The Bridge. She also had recurring roles in Lost Girl, Orphan Black and The Strain. In April 2019, Cadranel landed the recurring role of Harmony Miller on General Hospital. She was involved in a major storyline which resulted in the death of her character on May 4, 2022.

== Personal life ==
Cadranel is married to actor Gabriel Hogan; they have one son, Ryder.

== Filmography ==
=== Film ===
Year	Title	Role	Notes
2001	The Art of Woo	Miranda	Comedy film directed by Helen Lee
2003	The Gospel of John	Adulterous Woman	Epic film directed by Philip Saville; Adapted on a word-for-word basis from the American Bible Society's Good News Bible
2008	Killshot	Linda / Barmaid	Thriller film directed by John Madden
2012	The Riverbank	Angie Turner	Mystery film directed by John L'Ecuyer; Based on the novel Tracing Iris by Genni Gunn
2013	The Listener	Margo Furmanek	Short film directed and co–written by Laura Coconato
2019	Polar	Regina	Neo-noir action film directed by Jonas Åkerlund; Based on the 2012 webcomic of the same name by Víctor Santos
2019	The Rest of Us	Jane	Drama film directed by Aisling Chin-Yee

=== Television ===
Year	Title	Role	Notes
2000	Sex & Mrs. X	Mlle. Geddes	Made-for-TV Movie directed by Arthur Allan Seidelman
2000	Relic Hunter	Nadia	Episode: "Gypsy Jigsaw" (S 2:Ep 6)
2000	Dear America: A Line in the Sand	Aunt Esperanza	Made-for-TV Movie directed by William Fruet; Based on the book A Line in the Sand : The Alamo Diary of Lucinda Lawrence : Gonzales, Texas, 1836
2001	Leap Years	Frannie Batista	Recurring
2001	Earth: Final Conflict	Agent Moxsan	Episode: "Entombed" (S 5:Ep 9)
2002	Street Time	Carmen Aviles	Episode: "Pilot: Part 1" (S 1:p 1)
2002–05	The Eleventh Hour	Brooke Fairburn	Recurring
2004	Train 48	Distraught Woman	Episode: "Watch Your Back" (Ep 119)
2004	Degrassi: The Next Generation	Rachel Rhodes	"Time Stands Still: Part 2" (S 4:Ep 8); "Back in Black" (S 4:Ep 9)
2004–05	ReGenesis	Luisa Raposa	"The Secret War" (S 1:Ep 9); "The Source" (S 1:Ep 10)
2005	Kojak	Detective Washburn	Episode: "Pilot" (S 1:Ep 1)
2005–07	Jeff Ltd.	Liz Santerra	Contract role
2006–08	Rent-a-Goalie	Francesca	Contract role Canadian Comedy Award for Best Female Performance (2007); Nominated - Gemini Award for Best Ensemble Performance in a Comedy Series (2007–2009)
2007	Matters of Life and Dating	Extra	Made-for-TV Movie directed by Peter Wellington
2008	M.V.P.	Zita	Recurring
2008	The One That Got Away	Laura Lawton	Made-for-TV Movie directed by Stacey Stewart Curtis
2009	The Dating Guy	Bonnie	Episode: "Bonnie & Mar" (S 1:Ep 1–Pilot)
2010	Republic of Doyle	Terri Bishop	Episode: "Hit and Rum" (S 1:Ep 5)
2010	The Bridge	Jill	Contract role
2010–15	Lost Girl	Aife	Recurring
2011	Silent Witness	Vanessa Ramos	Made-for-TV Movie directed by Peter Markle; Based on the novel of the same name by Richard North Patterson
2012	King	Christine Boise	Episode: "Freddy Boise" (S 2:Ep 6)
2012	Copper	Contessa Popadou	Surviving Death (S 1:Ep 1–Pilot); Husbands and Fathers (S 1:Ep 2)
2013	Cracked	Marcela Houseman	Episode: "Inquest" (S 1:Ep 10)
2013	The Listener	Margo Furmanek	Episode: "Caged In" (S 4:Ep 7)
2013	Fir Crazy	Nanci	Made-for-TV Movie directed by Craig Pryce; Also known as Oh Christmas Tree
2014	The Strain	Diane	Recurring
2014	Only Human	Miriam	Made-for-TV Movie directed by Gavin O'Connor
2013–16	Orphan Black	Detective Angela "Angie" Deangelis	Recurring
2015	Backstrom	Chief Anna Cervantes	Recurring
2016	Dark Matter	Alicia Reynaud	Recurring
2017	Bones	Nancy Alpert	Episode: "The Flaw in the Saw" (S 12:Ep 6)
2018	Designated Survivor	Monica Van	Episode: "Overkill" (S 2:Ep 17)
2018	The Queen of Sin	Stella	Made-for-TV Movie directed by Jean-François Rivard
2019 – 22	General Hospital	Lorraine "Harmony" Miller	Recurring
2021 – 23	Workin' Moms	Tome	7 episodes
