= The Eiger Sanction =

The Eiger Sanction may refer to

- The Eiger Sanction (novel), a 1972 thriller novel by Trevanian, the pen name of Rodney William Whitaker
- The Eiger Sanction (film), the 1975 film adaptation of Trevanian's novel
