= Hal Dresner =

American screenwriter (1937–2023)

- Born: June 4, 1937; New York City, U.S.
- Died: March 17, 2023 (aged 85); Ashland, Oregon, U.S.
- Occupation: Screenwriter

Hal Dresner (June 4, 1937 – March 17, 2023) was an American screenwriter. He worked on such films as The Eiger Sanction, Zorro, The Gay Blade, and Sssssss. He is credited with writing the line, "What we have here is a failure to communicate" for the film Cool Hand Luke. He died of cancer in Ashland, Oregon, on March 17, 2023, at the age of 85.
