= Not Safe for Work (TV series) =

- Genre: Comedy
- Created by: D. C. Moore
- Written by: D.C. Moore
- Starring: Zawe Ashton; Sophie Rundle; Samuel Barnett; Tom Weston-Jones; Sacha Dhawan; Anastasia Hille; Jo Hartley
- Country of origin: United Kingdom
- Original language: English
- No. of series: 1
- No. of episodes: 6

Production
- Producers: Jemma Rodgers; Andy Baker; Murray Ferguson
- Cinematography: Gary Shaw; Maja Zamojda
- Editor: Sam Williams
- Running time: 45 minutes
- Production company: Clerkenwell Films

Original release
- Network: Channel 4
- Release: 30 June – 4 August 2015

Not Safe for Work is a British comedy-drama series created and written by D. C. Moore, produced by Clerkenwell Films and broadcast by Channel 4. The series, originally called Cut, explores the shattered personal and professional lives of a group of highly dysfunctional civil servants.

Despite being set in Northampton, the show was filmed 340 miles away in Glasgow.

== Plot ==
The series follows civil servant Katherine (Zawe Ashton), who is forced to move from London to a satellite office in Northampton following public sector cuts.

== Cast ==
- Zawe Ashton as Katherine
- Sophie Rundle as Jenny
- Sacha Dhawan as Danny
- Tom Weston-Jones as Anthony
- Sian Brooke as Martine
- Samuel Barnett as Nathanial
- Anastasia Hille as Jeffries
- Jo Hartley as Angela
