= Polar (film) =

2019 action film directed by Jonas Åkerlund

- Official release poster
- Directed by: Jonas Åkerlund
- Written by: Jayson Rothwell
- Based on: Polar: Came From the Cold by Víctor Santos
- Produced by: Jeremy Bolt; Robert Kulzer; Hartley Gorenstein
- Starring: Mads Mikkelsen; Vanessa Hudgens; Katheryn Winnick; Matt Lucas
- Cinematography: Pär M. Ekberg
- Edited by: Doobie White
- Music by: Deadmau5
- Production companies: Constantin Film; JB Pictures; Dark Horse Entertainment
- Distributed by: Netflix
- Release date: January 25, 2019
- Running time: 118 minutes
- Countries: United States; Germany; Canada
- Language: English

Polar is a 2019 neo-noir action thriller film directed by Jonas Åkerlund and written by Jayson Rothwell, based on Víctor Santos's 2013 graphic novel Polar: Came From the Cold. The film stars Mads Mikkelsen, Vanessa Hudgens, Katheryn Winnick, and Matt Lucas. It revolves around an aging assassin on the verge of retirement who becomes targeted by his employer wanting to cash in on his pension. Polar was released worldwide on Netflix on January 25, 2019. A second film, The Black Kaiser, is in development.

== Plot ==
In Chile, Michael Green, a retired former employee of assassin organization Damocles, is killed by a specialist hit squad consisting of decoy Sindy, sniper Facundo, and an assault team of Alexei, Karl, and Hilde, all of whom are also Damocles employees.

Duncan Vizla, "The Black Kaiser", is a Damocles employee nearing mandatory retirement on his 50th birthday. By making sizable contributions to his company retirement fund, he is owed over $8 million when he retires. Duncan is pressured into accepting one final contract by Vivian, a common associate of Damocles.

He travels to Belarus to fulfill the mission, but finds it was a setup to have him killed. Unknown to him, Mr. Blut, owner of Damocles, plans to sell the company and is inflating its value by murdering its retired operatives, receiving their retirement benefits by way of a clause in their contract that lists Damocles as a beneficiary.

Duncan, living in a remote Montana town, is haunted by flashbacks of his violent past. He begins to build a friendship with his troubled new neighbor, Camille. One day, after giving an ill-fated talk at a school about foreign countries and combat, he gives Camille a gun as a gift. While trying to teach her how to shoot, she breaks down, seemingly disturbed by the weapon.

Meanwhile, Facundo's squad works to locate Duncan's residence. While beating his accountant, Lomas, they receive a list of his current property holdings. They work through the list without any success, killing the residents of each property. They finally manage to track Duncan's location through recurring donation receipts to a Montana bank.

While coming home from stopping at the nearby town, Duncan finds Sindy broken down on the side of the road. The pair return to his house and start having sex. They are, however, interrupted by the kill squad. Duncan kills Sindy and all of the would-be assassins except for Alexei, who activates "Plan B.".

Alexei's girlfriend, Junkie Jane, while high on heroin, tells Duncan that "Plan B" was to kidnap Camille. Duncan seeks the help of his old friend Porter. Porter instead betrays and drugs Duncan.

Duncan awakens in Blut's mansion, chained to the ceiling. He is tortured for three days by Blut for killing Hilde, whom Blut was in a relationship with. Meanwhile, Camille is kept in a heroin-induced state by Junkie Jane.

On the third day of torture, Blut breaks off the blade of his favorite knife on metal fragments inside Duncan's body. In anger, Blut stabs Duncan in the left eye. Overnight, Duncan uses the broken blade to pick the locks on his shackles and, by morning, escapes the mansion, killing many of Blut's henchmen. He travels to see Jazmin, an old friend, who treats his wounds and supplies him with weapons.

Duncan calls Vivian and offers himself in exchange for Camille. She accepts, but on Blut's orders, she double-crosses Duncan and arrives with Alexei and more of Blut's henchmen. Duncan gives Vivian a chance to walk away, but she refuses; Duncan then uses remote-controlled machine guns to kill everyone, leaving only a critically wounded Vivian.

Duncan returns to the mansion, where the few remaining henchmen flee rather than face him. Now alone, Blut awaits Duncan but ends up decapitated while calling for someone to bring him Camille. Rescuing Camille, Duncan returns to Montana and treats her inside her cabin.

Duncan awakens one morning inside the cabin to find newspaper clippings of the murder of a family spread around Camille's bed. He recognizes the images as a hit that he carried out, albeit with bad intel, something that has haunted him ever since. The only survivor of the family was a daughter, who grew up to be Camille.

To assuage his guilty conscience he has been making anonymous donations to her ever since, and she tracked him down by following the money trail. Held at gunpoint by Camille, Duncan apologizes and tells her to close her mind and pull the trigger. However, she spares him, asking if they can determine who ordered her father dead, and he commits to help her.

== Cast ==
- Mads Mikkelsen as Duncan Vizla
- Vanessa Hudgens as Camille
- Katheryn Winnick as Vivian
- Matt Lucas as Blut
- Ruby O. Fee as Sindy
- Fei Ren as Hilde
- Anthony Grant as Facundo
- Josh Cruddas as Alexei
- Robert Maillet as Karl
- Lovina as Junkie Jane
- Julian Richings as Lomas
- Johnny Knoxville as Michael
- Richard Dreyfuss as Porter
- Anastasia Marinina as Evalina

== Crew ==
- Mateo Castaño-Suárez Spanish dialect coach for Mads Mikkelsen (uncredited).

== Production ==
The film was first announced in October 2014 as a live action adaptation of Dark Horse Comics' Polar, developed by Dark Horse Entertainment and Constantin Film. A spec script for the film by Jayson Rothwell was purchased. In October 2017, Mads Mikkelsen signed on to star in the film. In February 2018, Vanessa Hudgens, Katheryn Winnick and Matt Lucas joined the cast with Netflix onboard to distribute the film.

Filming began early February 2018 in Orono, Ontario, Canada, and continued around February 23 in Toronto, Ontario, with Swedish director Jonas Åkerlund at the helm. Among various filming locations used was the residence of musician Deadmau5, for the opening scene.

In September 2018, Deadmau5 announced that he was in the process of producing the film's original score.

Netflix started streaming the film on January 25, 2019, with Deadmau5 releasing the soundtrack on the same day.

== Soundtrack ==
The film's soundtrack album was released by Deadmau5 on January 25, 2019, through his record label Mau5trap. The soundtrack's release details were announced on January 8, 2019, along with the film's initial trailer. A single from the soundtrack album, "Midas Heel" was released on January 11, 2019, followed by the vocal version called "Drama Free" featuring Lights which was previously released on Mau5ville: Level 2. Several tracks of the score (such as "Somb", "Wilhelm" and "End") feature elements from Deadmau5's previous tracks from his seventh studio album While(1<2), as well as two new tracks named "Nosedive" and "Camilla", the former being a remake of his unreleased track "Rio", the latter being known previously as "Suite 02". Elements of "Nosedive" would later be reused in his 2023 track "Input Output" as well.

== Reception ==
=== Critical response ===
On Rotten Tomatoes, the film has an approval rating of 18% based on 50 reviews, with an average of 3.4/10. The website's critical consensus reads, "An action thriller starring Mads Mikkelsen as the world's most dangerous assassin should be terrifically entertaining, but Polar proves it's possible to ruin anything if you try." On Metacritic, the film has a weighted average score of 19 out of 100, based on reviews from 12 critics, indicating "overwhelming dislike".

== Accolades ==
Year	Award	Category	Nominee	Result	Ref.
2020	Leo Awards	Best Supporting Performance by a Female in a Motion Picture	Fei Ren	Nominated	

== Future ==
In May 2022, The Hollywood Reporter confirmed that Åkerlund would return to direct another film adaptation, The Black Kaiser, which its producers said would not be "a sequel or a prequel". Mikkelsen was set to reprise his role and co-write the screenplay with Jayson Rothwell, though it was later reported that only Rothwell was writing the film.

One year later, Variety reported that Derrick Borte had replaced Åkerlund as director and that Hudgens would appear in the film. Filming was set to begin in the third quarter of 2023.
