= List of Copper episodes =

Copper is an American crime drama television series created for BBC America by Tom Fontana and Will Rokos, who serve as executive producers along with Barry Levinson. The series stars Tom Weston-Jones as Kevin "Corky" Corcoran, a New York police officer in the Five Points area, Kyle Schmid as his friend and former commanding officer, the wealthy Robert Morehouse, Ato Essandoh as African-American physician Dr. Matthew Freeman, and Franka Potente as Five Points madam Eva Heissen. The series is set in the waning days of the Civil War, in the poor, largely Irish areas of the city. A total of 23 episodes aired over two seasons.

== Series overview ==
Season	Episodes	Originally released	
Season	Episodes	First released	Last released
1	10	August 19, 2012	October 21, 2012
2	13	June 23, 2013	September 22, 2013

== Episodes ==
=== Season 1 (2012) ===
No. overall	No. in season	Title	Directed by	Written by	Original release date	U.S. viewers (millions)
1	1	"Surviving Death"	Jeff Woolnough	Will Rokos and Tom Fontana	August 19, 2012	1.107
September 17, 1864. Kevin Corcoran ("Corky") is an Irish immigrant who becomes a police detective after he rotates out of the Union Army. Detective Corcoran's years in the Union Army included battles like Gettysburg (the bloodiest one in the Civil War). In the dangerous and crime-ridden slum, Five Points of New York City, Kevin meets a young girl named Annie while he is staking out a gang of bank robbers. Later that night, he is called to a murder scene and sees her body. He takes the body to Matthew Freeman, an African-American doctor who served with Kevin in the Union Army. Matthew tells him she died of a blow to the head and sketches the shape of the wound left by the weapon. Then Kevin meets Annie, alive, as the dead girl is her twin sister, Kate; Annie tells him how she and Kate were forced into child prostitution at Contessa Pompidou's brothel. Meanwhile, Matthew finds out the murder weapon is a cane with a wolf's head handle. Kevin discovers that the cane's owner is Winfred Haverford, an acquaintance of his wealthy friend and war companion, Robert Morehouse. Haverford likes young girls and frequents an uptown brothel run by Contessa Pompidou to satisfy his pleasures. Kate died there by his hands, but his wealth buys him immunity, so Haverford's wife, Elizabeth, asks Kevin to give Winfred the punishment he deserves.
2	2	"Husbands and Fathers"	Jeff Woolnough	Story by : Will Rokos and Tom Fontana; Teleplay by : Will Rokos	August 26, 2012	0.874
Corky is in The Tombs, in the basement of the Hall of Justice, inquiring about a golden locket belonging to his lost wife. He is summoned to the Morehouse's 23rd Street dwelling by Winfred Haverford, who tries to coerce Corky into revealing where he has hidden Annie. Pinkerton detectives, sent by Haverford, try unsuccessfully to do the same by using force, and eventually break Corky's thigh bone. John Reilly is also trying to find Annie, claiming she's his daughter. However, Annie reveals that Reilly is her abusive husband who forced her as a child to marry him. Then she ran off and ended up in Contessa Pompidou's brothel. Corky decides he has to act and devises a trap. Meanwhile Norbert, Robert's father, reveals a plan to covertly buy up all of Five Points and recruits Winfred to buy a church. Seeing this, Robert then recruits a very willing Elizabeth as a proxy to buy the same church to beat his father and Winfred to it. Molly returns Annie to Contessa Pompidou. Winfred comes to see Annie, but she left the window open to let Corky in. He overpowers Winfred, and Annie stabs Winfred to death, then lures the Contessa in, and Corky kills her. Corky flees, with Matthew's help, after making sure Annie is ready with a cover story. Sergeant Byrnes suspects Corky's involvement but is satisfied he could not have been involved after a doctor confirms Corky's injury. Robert comes to tell Corky that Elizabeth is adopting Annie.
3	3	"In the Hands of an Angry God"	Clark Johnson	Story by : Will Rokos and Tom Fontana; Teleplay by : Frank Pugliese	September 2, 2012	0.901
Corky is at a fancy dinner in the Haverford mansion where Robert reveals to him the plan to have "Irish" Jake McGinnis run for alderman. Outside the orphanage, two Irish immigrants start a ruckus but get chased away by Matthew. Not long afterward, one of them is found hanging at the stables he owned. It's determined the man was dead before being strung from the banisters. His friend names Rev. Garland as a suspect. Garland neither confirms or denies his innocence. Corky takes the body to Matthew and the doctor determines the stabler died of a needle pushed from the base of the skull into his brain before hanging. The crowd wants Garland to hang, but Corky wants more proof. He finds out that the stabler's friend is involved with the stabler's daughter. Then he is called to the stabler's house, where the body lies on the floor in his long johns. Someone has ripped off the suit and taken it with them. After a tip from Matthew, Corky ends up at a seamstress' house, where Corky finds her brother Jasper, who reveals the stabler had not paid for the suit, and Jasper's sister killed him; but she is long gone. To keep the peace, the police captain makes up a story to satisfy the daughter, and Francis buys the stables, having secretly been recruited by Robert to do so as his proxy, so the stabler's daughter can go and live with her lover in Greenwich Village. Matthew takes Jasper to live with him and Matthew's wife Sara. Molly is at a pawnshop where she finds the locket Corky is looking for. She shows it to Eva, who takes it from her. Eva goes back to the pawnshop, and the owner tells her he got the locket from Madame Grindel, an abortionist. When she goes to see this woman, Eva finds her murdered.
4	4	"The Empty Locket"	Clark Johnson	Story by : Will Rokos and Tom Fontana; Teleplay by : Kyle Bradstreet	September 9, 2012	0.837
As Robert is fighting other patrons in the brothel, Eva returns the Ellen's locket to Molly, upstairs. Later, Molly gives the locket to Corky and tells him Madam Grindel had pawned it. Now, Corky is forced to discover who killed Madam Grindel. Corky enters The Tombs to get some clues. One of the prisoners reveals the existence of a ledger that contains all of her clients' names, payments, and services provided. The detectives find the abortionist's sister, Mary Lockwood, who claims she has not found the ledger. Marcus Freeman, Matthew's uncle, comes to visit him. He sees a boxer in Jasper and eventually arranges an exhibition fight with Robert. At Madam Grendel's home, Corky does not find the ledger, either. However, he does find a burnt letter he brings to Matthew, who manages to make a legible copy. Captain Sullivan is not interested; however, the Morehouses are, especially since the letter implicates the very same Episcopal priest who is extorting them with the threat of exposing their scheme to buy up Five Points. Corky confronts the Reverend, who denies everything. Corky then leaks his knowledge to a reporter. This leads to two goons the Reverend used to search Grendel's house, but not closer to the murderer or the ledger. So, the murder remains unsolved. When the captain reprimands Corky for pursuing the case against his order, the Morehouses come in commending the captain for his good work on the case, thus bringing Corky back in the clear. Corky and Francis end up at the pawnshop, where the shopkeeper tells Corky that Madam Grendel bought the locket from Ellen out of pity, so Ellen could feed their daughter, and the abortionist later sold the locket to him. As Corky leaves, Francis remains to buy a ring for Molly, with which to properly propose to her. At the brothel, Eva kills Molly in anger, faking a suicide. As Francis is pondering married life later in the evening, when with Corky, Andrew comes to tell them that Molly is dead. Mary Lockwood, meanwhile, has kept the ledger a secret and is using it as a means of extortion.
5	5	"La Tempête"	Jeff Woolnough	Story by : Will Rokos and Tom Fontana; Teleplay by : Brant Englestein	September 16, 2012	0.704
Corky is refereeing a boxing match at the stables when he runs into a kingpin of the notorious Five Points Roderick gang, recently released from prison and coming for revenge. Elizabeth is at the Morehouses' persuading them to host a charity event. Francis, Andrew, and Andrew's brother-in-law are playing poker, and Andrew's brother-in-law cleans Andrew out. As Andrew is out to steal his money back, he and Francis uncover a plot by the Roderick gang to steal the charity money. Corky reveals this plot to Elizabeth, and she in turn recruits the sixth precinct as guards for the charity event and its yield. The police strike a deal with the O'Connell gang for safe passage. Nothing of any significance happens during the event. However, as the coppers bring the box with the yield to the bank, they get ambushed by the Roderick gang, and on their retreat they run into the O'Connells, who relieve them of the box. When the two gangs eventually open the box, they find it is empty, which results in a deadly stabbing. Corky finds Robert, and together they walk to the bank with the $50,000+ hidden in Robert's wooden leg. Meanwhile, Mary Lockwood becomes friendly with Francis, and Marcus is training Jasper for the exhibition match. In a drunken haze, Marcus makes a pass at Sara and eventually gets clobbered by Jasper, who comes to Sara's defense. When Matthew comes home, he kicks Marcus out of his house.
6	6	"Arsenic and Old Cake"	Jeff Woolnough	Story by : Will Rokos and Tom Fontana; Teleplay by : Kevin Deiboldt	September 23, 2012	0.624
Andrew is at a dentist's to have a rotten tooth removed, but the wrong one is pulled. The next morning, the dentist is dead. Sergeant Byrnes is first on the scene and eats a piece of fancy fruit cake; he soon afterward dies. The cake turns out to be laced with arsenic. The investigation unravels a string of events that began from the dentist's intending to poison his wife's lover, but the fruit cake was passed on until the dentist got it back, so he is declared to have murdered himself. Meanwhile, Elizabeth tries unsuccessfully to discipline Annie and eventually returns the girl to Reilly, thinking he is Annie's father. Robert and Marcus are at the exhibition fight between Jasper Longfield and Jake McGinnis. Jasper is supposed to take a dive, but refuses to. In the 71st round, Jasper is slugged by the referee, and Jake is declared winner. Robert later visits Jasper and gives him a ticket to leave New York to escape retaliation. Corky is at Elizabeth's house enjoying a glass of brandy, when she tells him Annie was sent to live with a family in California. She then seduces Corky.
7	7	"The Hudson River School"	Larysa Kondracki	Story by : Will Rokos and Tom Fontana; Teleplay by : Frank Pugliese	September 30, 2012	0.404
Reilly has Annie chained in his upstate New York barn; she tricks and kills him, then escapes back to Corky's house. Corky violently breaks up with Elizabeth for giving Annie to Reilly, then returns to Riley's farm upstate and covers up the murder for Annie. Robert meets some "Canadian" traders who he finds are actually Confederates planning to set New York ablaze with Greek fire. The leader is a Confederate and former Union prisoner of war named Kennedy. Later, Robert consoles and seduces Elizabeth, introducing her to opium in the process. Sara is pregnant.
8	8	"Better Times are Coming"	Larysa Kondracki	Story by : Will Rokos and Tom Fontana; Teleplay by : Sara Cooper	October 7, 2012	0.436
Election day, 1864, Lincoln wins. Tammany Hall voting fraud is extensive, especially in Five Points. The Confederates plot to burn the city, but Robert, while pretending to support them, manages to destroy the Greek fire. Mary Lockwood is found dead in Central Park's Sheep Meadow, and Corky suspects Maguire may be the killer. While following Maguire, Corky discovers that Maguire has been keeping Ellen, Corky's missing wife, in an asylum; she seems to have amnesia.
9	9	"A Day to Give Thanks"	Ken Girotti	Story by : Will Rokos and Tom Fontana; Teleplay by : Kyle Bradstreet	October 14, 2012	0.513
Corky tracks down Maguire and finds him in the church they grew up in. Maguire confesses that had an affair with Ellen, she became pregnant, and they paid for the abortion with the locket, but afterward Ellen became mentally unstable. Maguire asks Corky to kill him because he can't live with the guilt. Later, Ellen becomes coherent and admits that she pushed and accidentally killed her daughter. The Confederate agents blackmail Robert's father to help them, when Norbert's business records documenting his arms dealing and smuggling deals with a Southern senator fall into their hands. Elizabeth meets the Booth brothers, famous actors, and helps them raise funds for their charity performance at the Winter Garden Theater.
10	10	"A Vast and Fiendish Plot"	Ken Girotti	Story by : Will Rokos and Tom Fontana; Teleplay by : Will Rokos	October 21, 2012	0.523
The Confederates are making a second attempt to burn New York, and Robert alerts Corky and the NYPD. They interrupt a shipment at Spuyten Duyvil Creek, only to learn that transaction is a decoy; Greek Fire is being manufactured in secret in New York City. Later, they are able to prevent the fires from spreading. Maguire asks to help and is shot and wounded by Confederates. Robert's father is charged with treason and exiled to Atlanta. A knock on the door late at night reveals Elizabeth has been conspiring with Kennedy, the leader of the Confederate spy ring. Corky is grieving for his daughter and injecting morphine.

=== Season 2 (2013) ===
No. overall	No. in season	Title	Directed by	Written by	Original release date	U.S. viewers (millions)
11	1	"Home, Sweet Home"	Larysa Kondracki	Thomas Kelly, Will Rokos & Tom Fontana	June 23, 2013	N/A
February 5, 1865. The Sixth Ward gets a new ward boss, General Brendan Donovan, who is determined to hold his men to the highest standards. He sends Corky and his men after "Buzzy" Burke, a violent brothel and gaming parlor owner on a killing spree. Buzzy attacks Eva and carves his initials into her back. Corky eventually manages to arrest Burke, though not before he breaks into Corky's house and terrorizes Ellen. While in jail Buzzy picks a fight with Maguire, who kills Buzzy. At his trial, Maguire is cleared due to evidence having disappeared. Elizabeth Haverford and Robert Morehouse plan their wedding, and Elizabeth hires Sarah as a seamstress. When Robert tells Elizabeth that the Confederate spy Kennedy has been caught in Detroit, Elizabeth becomes disturbed and her opium addiction increases. Eva takes over Burke's stable of prostitutes. Dr. Freeman faces a tough decision when Dr. Hegel, the doctor who trained Freeman, asks Dr. Freeman to return to Five Points and take over his medical practice.
12	2	"Aileen Aroon"	Larysa Kondracki	Kyle Bradstreet	June 30, 2013	N/A
Corky leads the search for the killer and kidnapper of seven boys. Sarah objects to Dr. Freeman returning to Five Points and Ellen is distraught that Corky sent away all the belongings of their dead daughter. Ellen learns of Corky’s attempted desertion from the Union Army to find her and her daughter. Sarah listens to Frederick Douglass speak on slaves' rights at a dinner hosted by Robert Morehouse and Elizabeth Haverford, and Sarah decides to move beyond her past. Elizabeth becomes disturbed when the confederate spy leader Kennedy is drawn through the streets of New York and imprisoned. She visits him in jail, and their conversation reveals that Elizabeth conspired with Kennedy in exchange for very lucrative Southern cotton contracts. Frances Maguire is rapidly rising through the ranks of a counterfeiting ring, the Druids, through violent tactics.
13	3	"The Children of the Battlefield"	Ken Girotti	Kevin Deiboldt	July 7, 2013	N/A
Corky and Andrew capture the suspect in the murder and kidnapping of seven boys press-ganged by Union Army recruiters. In his hunt to find the killer and save the boys, Corky stands up Robert Morehouse as his best man and his wife goes alone to the wedding. Upon Dr. Freeman’s return to Five Points, Sarah confronts her past by knocking down the lamppost on which her brothers were hung in the Draft Riots. Frances Maguire earns acceptance in the criminal organization, the Druids, by killing a young policeman. Elizabeth is passing to and delivering messages from the confederate spy leader Kennedy in prison. On her wedding night, having taken a large dose of opium, Elizabeth confesses her crime to Robert. Corky and Robert Morehouse end up bunking together at Eva’s for the night. The police launch a massive manhunt for the killer of the policeman, but don't yet know that Maguire is the killer.
14	4	"I Defy Thee to Forget"	Ken Girotti	Sara B. Cooper (Teleplay), Tom Fontana, Thomas Kelly	July 14, 2013	N/A
Ellen discovers that Annie has stolen a necklace from the Morehouse home; Corky arrives home during their confrontation, takes Annie's side, and walks out on his wife. Later, however, Annie steals the necklace again from him and runs away. Maguire is caught with plates for printing counterfeit money, and when another member of the gang goes to the cops to accuse him of killing Phinbar, he's arrested for murder. Elizabeth Morehouse, not yet reconciled with her husband, locates Sara Freeman's mother and goes to Virginia to bring her back.
15	5	"A Morning Song"	Larysa Kondracki	Frank Pugliese (Teleplay), Kyle Bradstreet, Will Rokos	July 21, 2013	N/A
Counterfeiter Philomen Keating takes over the precinct in a mad campaign to get his counterfeiting plates back. Several people are killed and Captain Sullivan is shot. Eventually Corky and his supporters storm the station but their efforts are thwarted when Keating seizes Annie, who was waiting at the station for Corky, and threatens her. Keating orders Maguire released from his holding cell, but Maguire unexpectedly shoots Keating, killing him and ending the siege. Afterwards, Donovan reveals that Maguire had joined the Druids on his orders in order to bring them down; Maguire is reinstated and Donovan orders he and Corky to shake hands and make nice.
16	6	"To One Shortly to Die"	Clark Johnson	Story by : Tom Fontana and Kevin Deiboldt; Teleplay by : Kate Erickson	July 28, 2013	N/A
Corky and Maguire are sent to investigate a murder; although it appears the man's son is the killer, Corky isn't convinced and when the son is also found dead he's proved right. Elizabeth Morehouse returns from Virginia bringing Sara's mother Hattie. Hattie asks Sara about her brothers and, rather than upset her mother, Sara tells a story about them dying heroically trying to save passengers on a sinking ferry. Robert Cobb Kennedy's trial begins; rather than testify against him and incriminate Elizabeth, Morehouse persuades his father to give evidence and Kennedy is convicted. Ellen struggles with the knowledge that she's pregnant again.
17	7	"The Hope Too Bright to Last"	Nathan Morlando	Story by : Thomas Kelly; Teleplay by : T Cooper & Allison Glock-Cooper	August 4, 2013	N/A
Corky is still puzzling over the father-and-son murders, but Donovan discourages him from further investigation. Morehouse loses a great deal of money on a railroad deal gone bad and is forced to accept help from his father. Matthew Freeman investigates an epidemic among Five Points' poor. Ellen goes to see Eva, who slyly hints that Corky is the father of her child, and then visits Dr Freeman's home and confesses to Sara and Hattie that she hasn't seen Corky in a month and isn't sure she can bear having another child alone. She does not admit the child is not Corky's. Later, Sara tells Corky about Ellen's pregnancy and Corky hurries home only to find Ellen dead by her own hand.
18	8	"Ashes Denote That Fire Was"	Deborah Chow	Story by : Tom Fontana and Kyle Bradstreet; Teleplay by : Andrea Ciannavei	August 18, 2013	0.395
The greater Copper family - Uptown and Five Points alike - gather around Detective Kevin Corcoran, who is reeling from a shocking loss. In a quest to cure the illness sweeping Five Points on a grander scale, Doctor Matthew Freeman steps beyond his role as physician. Robert Morehouse finds himself fighting to ensure that a tumultuous chapter of his past is dead and buried, and that he and his loved ones lives will continue to thrive.
19	9	"Think Gently of the Erring"	Clement Virgo	Story by : Kevin Deiboldt and Will Rokos; Teleplay by : Theresa Rebeck	August 25, 2013	0.431
Returning to the Precinct, Detective Kevin Corcoran is staggered when he discovers a new investigation has one close to him in chains. Racing to free his friend, Corcoran seeks help from those in power. However, General Brendan Donovan is consumed by an upcoming, major political and business move. Meanwhile, Doctor Matthew Freeman approaches Robert Morehouse to suggest a joint effort to aid the city.
20	10	"The Fine Ould Irish Gintleman"	Larysa Kondracki	Kyle Bradstreet (Teleplay), Will Rokos, Tom Fontana	September 1, 2013	N/A
Detective Kevin Corcoran begins to question the motives behind strongholds of the Five Points community, and he solicits coppers of the Sixth Precinct to suss out the truth. In a collision of public and private spheres, Robert Morehouse’s marriage creates strife in his business ventures. The Freeman family struggles to maintain their freedom and well-being while confronting bigots in their community.
21	11	"Good Heart and Willing Hand"	T.J. Scott	Story by : Kevin Deiboldt and Kyle Bradstreet; Teleplay by : Kevin Deiboldt	September 8, 2013	N/A
Looming devastation to Five Points forces Detective Kevin Corcoran to take drastic, irrevocable action. Injuries old and new push Doctor Matthew Freeman to the breaking point. As Elizabeth Morehouse spirals further into addiction, intervention comes from the unlikeliest of sources.
22	12	"Beautiful Dreamer"	Kari Skogland	Thomas Kelly	September 15, 2013	0.351
On the move, evading retaliation, Detective Kevin Corcoran works to remain hidden while seeing through events he set in motion. Old loyalties are tested and unlikely friends are made as the people of Five Points and uptown struggle to maintain their foothold in a city driven by vengeance. A catastrophic national event shatters the hope of smooth post-war recovery for not only the people of New York City, but also the United States at large.
23	13	"The Place I Called My Home"	Larysa Kondracki	Will Rokos	September 22, 2013	0.445
In the wake of national tragedy, Detective Kevin Corcoran reels like the rest of the country. As Corcoran mourns with Robert Morehouse and Doctor Matthew Freeman, the three men decide to join a national effort once more. For the three friends, the mission elicits memories from the battlefield, resurfaces faces from the past, and creates opportunity for Five Points chaos to continue unabated.
