= Hotel Bellevue des Alpes =

Historic alpine hotel in the Bernese Oberland, Switzerland

Hôtel Bellevue des Alpes
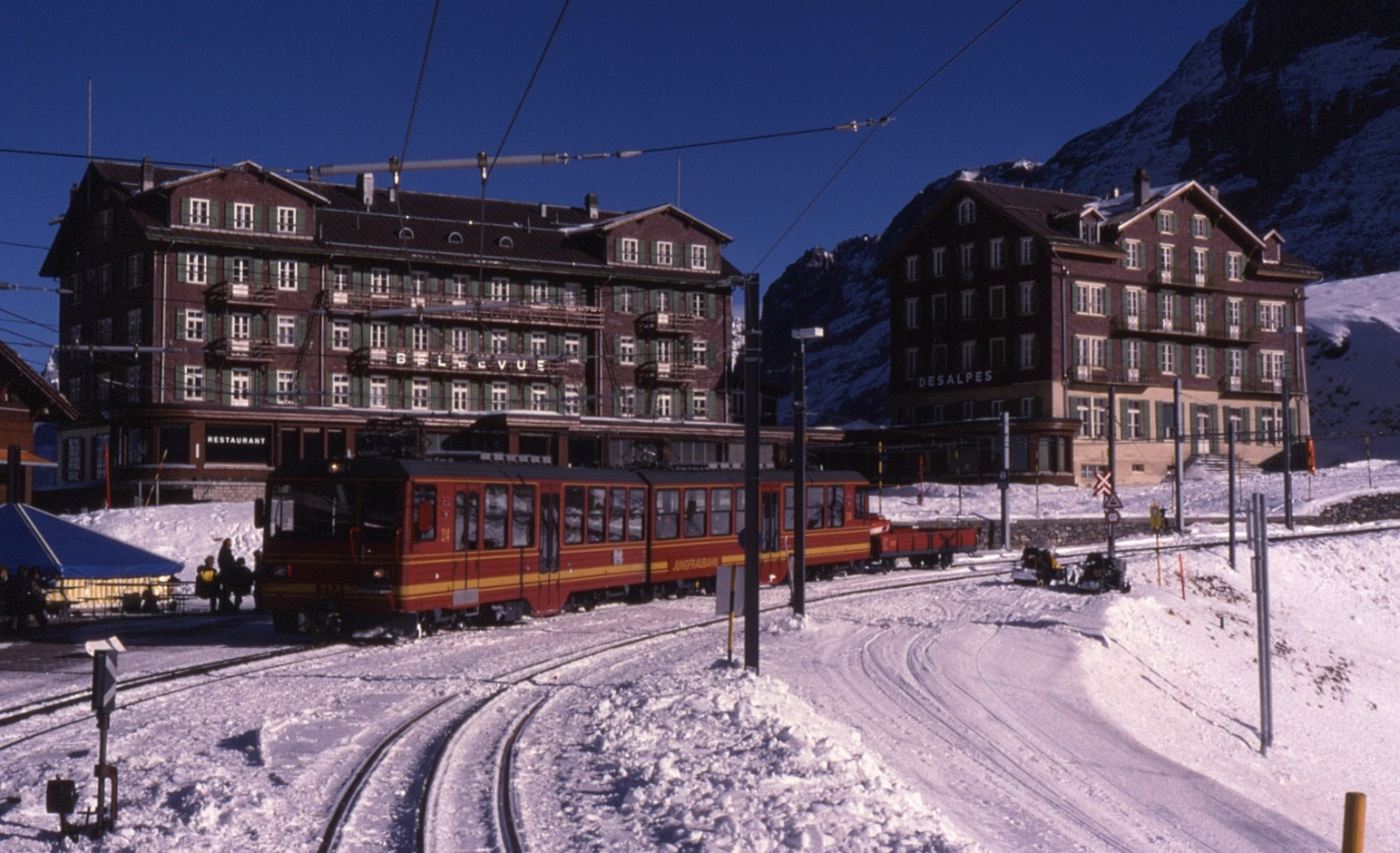
- Hotel Bellevue des Alpes with the Eiger in the background, December 1999

- Location within Switzerland Location within Canton of Bern

General information
- Location: Kleine Scheidegg, Bernese Oberland, Switzerland
- Coordinates: 46°35′7″N 7°57′43″E
- Opening: circa 1840 (as Zur Gemse)
- Owner: Von Almen family (since 1912)

Technical details
- Floor count: 4

Design and construction
- Developer: Christian Seiler

Other information
- Number of rooms: 60
- Parking: None (rail access only)

Hôtel Bellevue des Alpes is a historic alpine hotel in Kleine Scheidegg in the Bernese Oberland, Switzerland. Located at about 2,070 metres (6,790 ft) above sea level, it lies between the valleys of Grindelwald and Wengen, beneath the Eiger, Mönch, and Jungfrau peaks.

The Hôtel Bellevue des Alpes, with 60 rooms and 90 beds, and a restaurant with a capacity for 150 people, is among the few surviving grand hotels from the nineteenth century in the Alps, still operated by the same family across several generations. It is known for its heritage architecture and for serving as a location in films such as The Eiger Sanction (1975), directed by and starring Clint Eastwood and George Kennedy.

== History ==
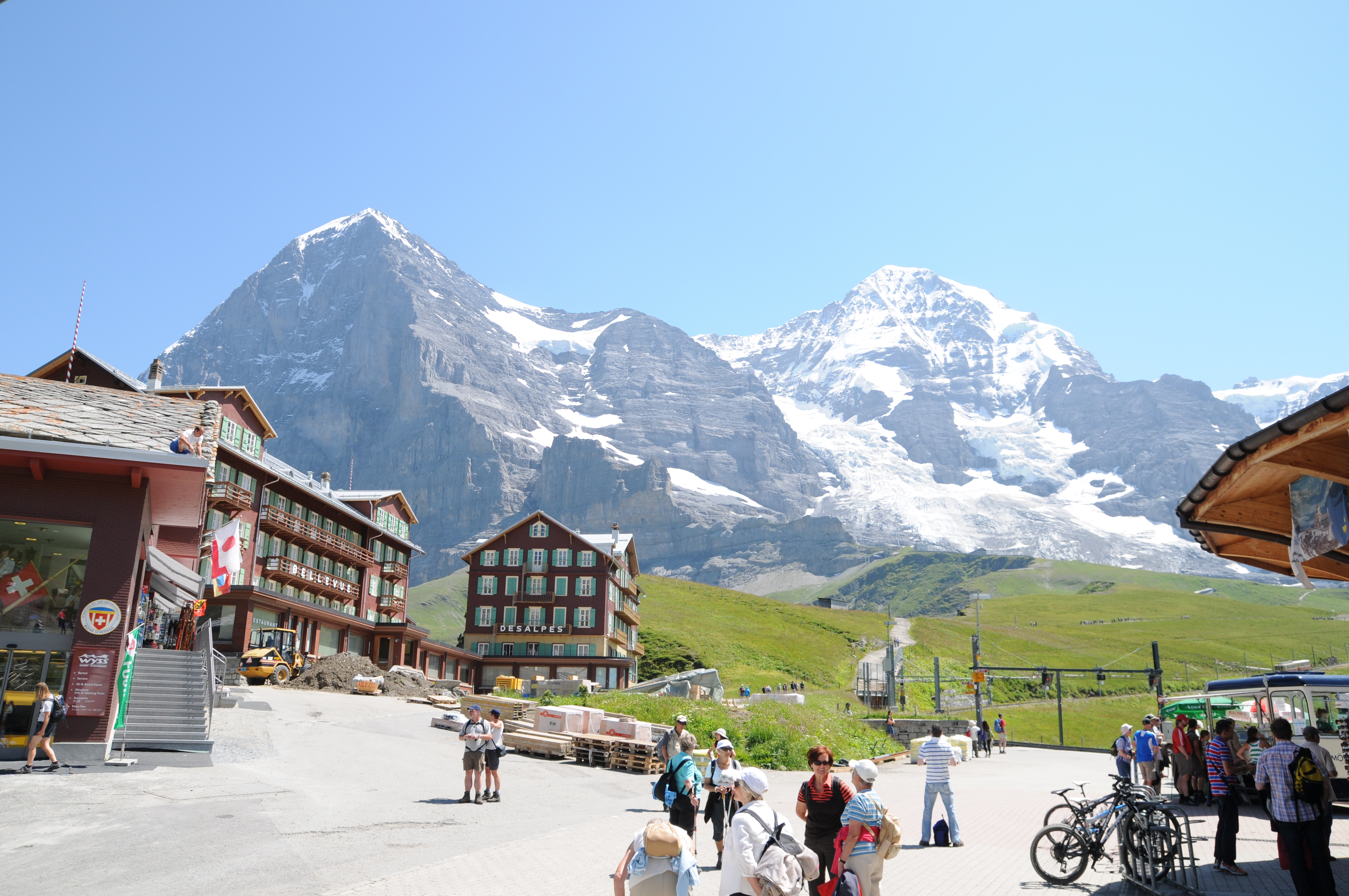
Hotel setting with the Eiger and Mönch mountains in the background

The origins of the hotel date to the early nineteenth century, when travelers crossing Kleine Scheidegg in summer were offered refreshment at Alpine shelters. In about 1835, the Bernese government granted a license for a summer inn in such a shelter to Peter Brawand of Grindelwald. In 1840, Christian Seiler purchased the inn known as Zur Gemse ("Inn of the Chamois") and transformed it into what would become Hotel Bellevue (lit. 'beautiful view').

Following the construction of the Wengernalp Railway in 1893, which connected Grindelwald via Kleine Scheidegg to Wengen and Lauterbrunnen, the hotel’s accessibility improved substantially. Shortly after the railway was built, a nearby establishment called Hotel des Alpes was constructed by the local Alp cooperative as a competitor to Bellevue. That hotel was acquired by Adolf Seiler in 1912. In 1929, the two buildings were formally merged into a single enterprise under the name Bellevue des Alpes, and the first winter season was introduced.

Between 1947 and 1948, the hotel underwent major extension and renovation; among the changes was the addition of a bel étage to the Bellevue building. Since that time, most refurbishments have focused primarily on interior or stylistic restoration rather than structural expansion.

The hotel has remained in the same family. After the death of Fritz von Almen (who had been owner‐manager) in 1974, his wife assumed management. In 1998, the property and the surrounding land were transferred to her nephew Andreas von Almen, who together with his wife Silvia (a flutist) manages the hotel.

Today, Bellevue des Alpes is recognized as a Swiss Historic Hotel, awarded "Historic Hotel of the Year 2011" by the International Council on Monuments and Sites (ICOMOS) for its exemplary preservation of architecture.

== Architecture, facilities and access ==
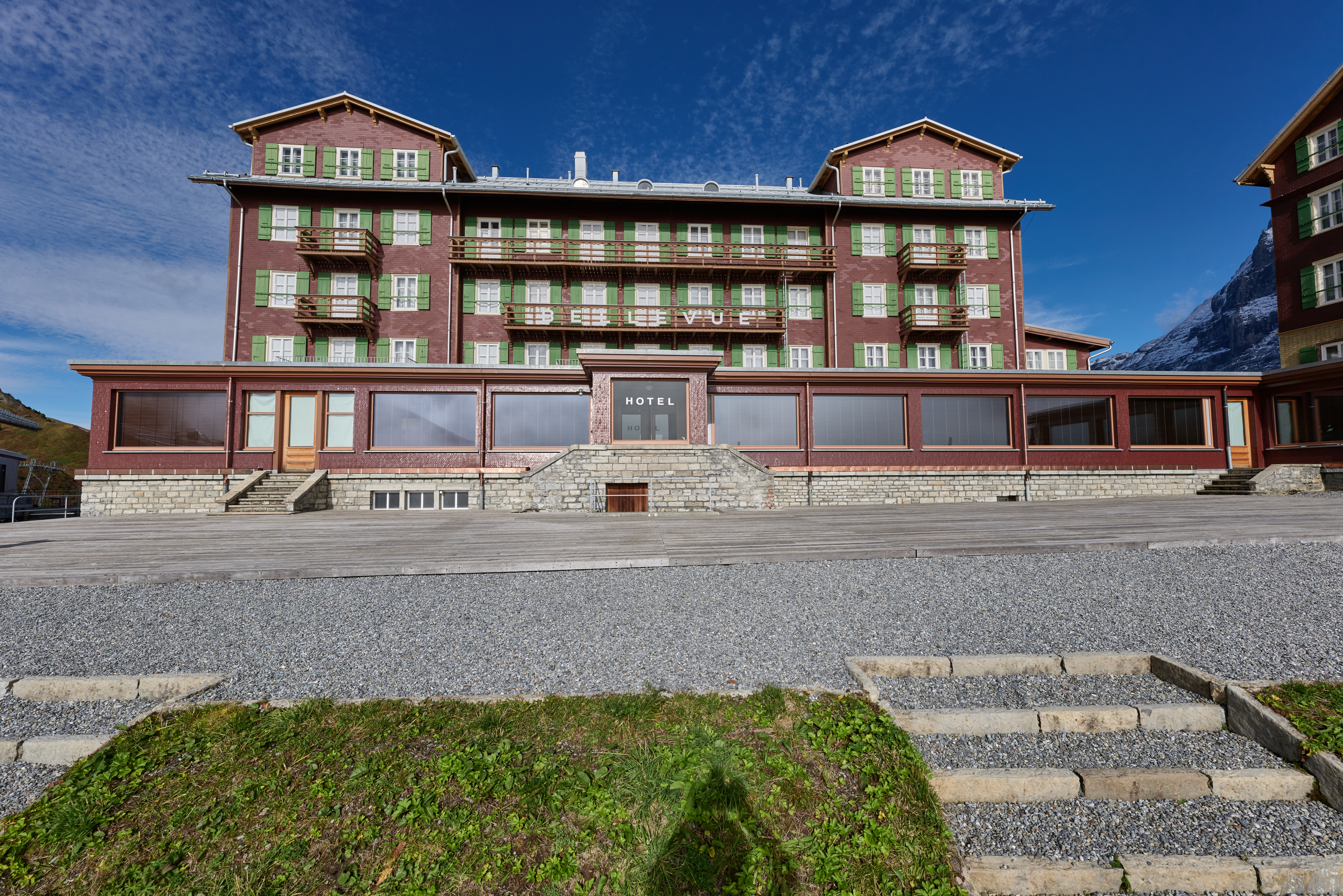
View of the hotel

Hotel Bellevue des Alpes, described by Lonely Planet as "rambling, creaky, and atmospheric", has approximately 90 guest beds, in 60 rooms. When the two hotel were merged in the late 1920s, they were renovated to be winter‑worthy, with many bathrooms were installed, and the English‑style foyer, lounge, bar (decorated with watercolours by Walter Trier), a small banquet room in French style with a view of the Eiger North Face, the restaurant with views toward the Mönch and the Blümlisalp, and a tea terrace were added.

Today, the lounge, bar, dining areas, and vestibule retain decor from the 1920s, and many of the interior furnishings, lighting, wall coverings and public rooms are maintained to evoke that period. Condé Nast Traveller writes of the hotel: "Outside, green shutters, symmetry and the name in a classic font on the L-shaped façade; inside, a sense of Agatha Christie, from the carriage-like wood-panelled dining room to the wallpapered lobby and up the creaky winding stairs to rooms with patterned lampshades and dial-up rotary phones."

The hotel restaurant has a capacity for about 150 people. It serves traditional Swiss cuisine. One hiking and restaurant website review cited the hotel as having "the best pea soup in the Swiss Alps", and described a meal with pea cream soup for starters, followed by burrata and tomatoes, salmon and vegetables and hot mousse for dessert. Afternoon tea is served on the terrace, paying homage to the British mountaineers who arrived and did the same in 1850s. The bar hosts live music in the evenings, often small jazz ensembles or soloists.

The building is accessible only by the Wengernalpbahn railway (no road access), which contributes to its sense of remoteness. The hotel is also television-free, and mobile phone use is discouraged, to further contribute to its isolation.

== In popular culture ==
The hotel is best known in film and popular culture for appearing in The Eiger Sanction (1975) directed by and starring Clint Eastwood and George Kennedy. Eastwood and his cast stayed at Bellevue des Alpes in the summer of 1974 during the shooting and used it as a location. It is also cited by tourism and heritage sources for its role in other mountain films.

== See also ==
- List of hotels
- List of hotels in Switzerland
- List of restaurants in Switzerland
- Tourism in Switzerland
