= The Eiger Sanction (novel) =

Book by Trevanian

- First edition cover
- Author: Trevanian
- Language: English
- Genre: Thriller
- Publisher: Outlet (Crown)
- Publication date: October 1972
- Publication place: United States
- Media type: Print
- Pages: 316 (First edition)
- ISBN: 0-517-50034-5
- OCLC: 508403
- Dewey Decimal: 811/.5/4
- LC Class: PZ4.T8135 Ei PS3570.R44
- Followed by: The Loo Sanction

The Eiger Sanction is a 1972 thriller novel by Trevanian, the pen name of Rodney William Whitaker. The story is about a classical art professor and collector who doubles as a professional assassin, and who is coerced out of retirement to avenge the murder of an American agent. The novel was made into a film of the same name in 1975, directed by and starring Clint Eastwood. Whitaker wrote a sequel entitled The Loo Sanction.

== Plot ==
Dr. Jonathan Hemlock is an art professor and mountaineer. He is also a collector of paintings, most of them obtained from the black market. To finance his collection, Hemlock, who served in the Counter Intelligence Corps during the Korean War, works as a so-called "counter-assassin" for a secret US government agency, the CII.

In order to acquire a Pissarro, Hemlock agrees to carry out a couple of "sanctions" (contract assassinations targeted specifically against killers of American agents). The first one is easily dealt with in Montreal. For the second, he will need to join a group of climbers who are about to attempt the north face of the Eiger, a particularly difficult challenge that Hemlock has tried before and failed. Hemlock goes back into training and eventually climbs the mountain with the team that he believes includes his would-be victim — whose identity he will have to deduce on the mountain itself. Poor climbing conditions disrupt the climb and lead Hemlock to the discovery that his target is someone other than he had expected.

== Notes ==
- The progress of the climb in the book almost exactly mirrors the 1936 attempt on the Eigerwand (North Face of the Eiger) by Bavarian climbers Andreas Hinterstoisser and Toni Kurz and Austrian climbers Willy Angerer and Edi Rainer.
- The title and plot of "The Archer Sanction", the third episode of the sixth season of Archer, were inspired by The Eiger Sanction.
- Victor Santos cited The Eiger Sanction as one of the inspirations for his comic Polar.

== See also ==
- Assassinations in fiction
- Spy fiction
