= Polar (webcomic) =

2012 webcomic and graphic novel series by Victor Santos

- Cover of Polar: Came From the Cold
- Author: Víctor Santos
- Current status/schedule: Ongoing
- Launch date: 2 January 2012
- Publisher: Dark Horse Comics

Polar is a 2012 webcomic and series of graphic novels written and illustrated by Spanish cartoonist Victor Santos. Featuring "international hitman Black Kaiser" from Santos' 2009 graphic novel Black Kaiser, the webcomic is inspired by a variety of action and noir fiction. Polar is characterized by its highly stylized design and complete lack of dialogue, though speech balloons were added in the graphic novel publications by Dark Horse Comics. A live-action film based on the webcomic premiered on Netflix in January 2019, starring Mads Mikkelsen, to which a sequel is in development.

== Content ==
Polar depicts the story of international hitman Black Kaiser, the titular character of Santos' 2009 graphic novel Black Kaiser, as he is forced out of retirement after an assassination attempt is made on his life. The story, described as "bleak", features a femme fatale character and a large amount of gore, and it is set in an icy landscape. The webcomic is notable for its lack of dialogue and speech balloons, and features a somewhat minimalistic style in color, being rendered entirely in stark black, white, and orange.

== Development ==
=== Conception ===
Víctor Santos was known for creating several graphic novels, such as Filthy Rich and The Mice Templar, before he began uploading Polar as a webcomic in 2012. Santos conceived the protagonist of Polar, Black Kaiser, for an action noir comic he published in 2010. Black Kaiser was inspired by Jim Steranko's S.H.I.E.L.D. comics, and Santos described the creation of this story as "mixing classic Marvel books, Trevanian novels, Bourne movies and manga action." The publisher of Black Kaiser eventually lost interest in the comic, though Santos still had various narratives in mind featuring the character.

Santos began working on Polar after finishing his work on Godzilla: Kingdom of Monsters for IDW Publishing in 2011 and while waiting for the script for The Mice Templar. Santos stated that he generally works on his own projects during job breaks, so that he "never [goes] long without drawing."

"I found it fun to do a story weekly and see the readers' reaction with every page."

— –Víctor Santos

Santos got the idea of publishing Polar as a webcomic rather than by traditional means after reading Kathryn and Stuart Immonen's Moving Pictures. The format allows him to follow readers' response for each update and correct mistakes more rapidly, and Santos stated that he loves the widescreen layout that is possible on web pages. As a personal project, Polar allowed him to develop storytelling experiments without limitations, though Santos decided to use a minimal style for the webcomic as each page should not take more than a few hours to complete.

Santos has listed a large number of influences on the Polar website. He states that the minimalistic and "direct" style is inspired by films such as Le Samouraï (1967), Tokyo Drifter (1965), and Point Blank (1967), as well as novels like The Killer Inside Me (1952) and The Eiger Sanction (1972). Santos describes Polar as "a tribute to artists like Jim Steranko, José Antonio Muñoz, Alberto Breccia, Alex Toth and Frank Miller." Santos got caught in the "manga explosion of the '80 and '90s" during his teenage years and came in touch with many United States' comic book artists while at university. In an interview with Comic Book Resources, Santos said that he was introduced to many 1960s films by someone from his cinema class, and that they both were big fans of the works of John Woo during his university years.

=== Production ===
Santos decided to exclude any dialogue in Polar primarily so he did not have to waste time on translating the webcomic from Spanish to English. This stylistic choice was simple to commit to at the start of the webcomic, as Polar begins with an action sequence. However, Santos noted that leaving out any dialogue became more difficult when Black Kaiser started to do investigations, as he had to depict conversations using solely gestures, facial expressions, and repeated imagery.

The story for Polar is improvised, though Santos does have a direction in mind. Santos sketches the pages for Polar with pencils, using a red marker to indicate which places he wants to depict in red. Sometimes, he makes some changes after scanning a new page in order to reach a certain balance of color. When Santos started working on the third "season" of the webcomic, the story started becoming more complex and he needed more colors and art elements to balance the figures out.

== Release and adaptations ==
The first pages of Polar were originally released online in January 2012, which was the start of the long-running webcomic series. At the 2013 San Diego Comic-Con, Dark Horse Comics announced that they would publish Polar as a 160-page hardcover graphic novel. This version, which was released in November 2013 as Polar: Came From the Cold, featured dialogue presented in speech balloons. Dark Horse' Jim Gibbons suggested the change as it would make the book more commercially attractive, and Santos already had a version with dialogue in mind, but initially refrained from creating it due to the challenge writing in English presented him.

A second volume of Polar was published by Dark Horse Comics in April 2015, titled Eye for an Eye. A third volume was released in August 2016, titled No Mercy for Sister Maria, and a fourth and final volume, The Kaiser Falls, was released in April 2019. Each Polar book covers one webcomic "season", corrected and expanded upon. No Mercy for Sister Maria includes thirty pages that were not originally present in the webcomic.

=== Publications ===
- Santos, Víctor (2019-03-19). Polar Volume 0 The Black Kaiser. Dark Horse Comics. ISBN 978-1506712512.
- Santos, Víctor (2013-12-10). Polar Volume 1 Came From the Cold. Dark Horse Comics. ISBN 978-1616552329.
- Santos, Víctor (2015-04-28). Polar Volume 2 Eye for an Eye. Dark Horse Comics. ISBN 978-1616556167.
- Santos, Víctor (2016-08-30). Polar Volume 3 No Mercy for Sister Maria. Dark Horse Comics. ISBN 978-1506700533.
- Santos, Víctor (2019-04-02). Polar Volume 4 The Kaiser Falls. Dark Horse Comics. ISBN 978-1506711171.

=== Films ===
In October 2014, Dark Horse Comics announced that Polar: Came From the Cold would be adapted into a live action film, produced as a collaboration between the publisher's entertainment division and Constantin Film. A spec script for the film was written by Jayson Rothwell, and the companies hoped to be able to begin shooting the feature in spring 2015.

In October 2017 it was announced that Mads Mikkelsen would star in the action-thriller Polar. Swedish director Jonas Åkerlund helmed Jayson Rothwell's adaptation of the Dark Horse graphic novel Polar: Came From the Cold by Victor Santos. Mister Smith Entertainment debut the feature film to international buyers at the American Film Market, which was on November 1, 2017, in Santa Monica, California.

Producers are Constantin Film's Robert Kulzer, Bolt Pictures’ Jeremy Bolt, Dark Horse Entertainment's Mike Richardson, and Keith Goldberg. Martin Moszkowicz is the executive producer.

Netflix eventually picked up the rights to the film and released it on January 25, 2019.

In May 2022, The Hollywood Reporter confirmed Åkerlund would direct another Polar film with the title of The Black Kaiser, a new take of the comics that would be neither "a sequel or a prequel". Mikkelsen is set to reprise his role as Duncan Vizla as well as assisting Rothwell with the writing. In May 2023, Variety reported that Derrick Borte had replaced Åkerlund as director, with Vanessa Hudgens reprising her role from the first film alongside Mikkelsen, and filming being set to commence in Fall 2023.
