= The Loo Sanction =

1973 novel by Trevanian

- First edition
- Author: Trevanian
- Language: English
- Genre: Thriller
- Publisher: Avon
- Publication date: 1973
- Publication place: United States
- Media type: Print
- Pages: 351
- Preceded by: The Eiger Sanction

The Loo Sanction is a 1973 sequel novel to The Eiger Sanction written by Trevanian.

== Plot ==
In London, England, Jonathan Hemlock is blackmailed into performing another "sanction", a top-secret political assassination.

== Critical reception ==
Some critics derided The Loo Sanction and The Eiger Sanction as "pale James Bond derivatives" while Trevanian considered the books intentional Bond spoofs.
