= Tom Weston-Jones =

English actor

- Born: Thomas Weston-Jones; 29 June 1987 (age 39); Burton upon Trent, Staffordshire, England, United Kingdom
- Education: • Royal Holloway University of London • Bristol Old Vic Theatre School • Dubai College
- Occupation: Actor
- Years active: 2010–present

Tom Weston-Jones (born 29 June 1987) is an English actor, known for his role in Copper and for playing Richard Lee in Warrior (2019).

== Early life and education ==
Weston-Jones was born in Burton-upon-Trent, Staffordshire, and was brought up in Dubai, having gone to school at Dubai College. He holds a degree in drama and theatre from Royal Holloway University of London, and has trained at the Bristol Old Vic Theatre School.

== Career ==
Weston-Jones has had success on television. He is best known for portraying Irish immigrant Detective Kevin Corcoran in the BBC America television series Copper. His other roles include Anthony in Not Safe for Work, Meriwether Compeyson in Dickensian and Richard Lee in Warrior.

== Filmography ==
=== Television ===
Year	Title	Genre	Role	Notes
2011	The Night Watch	Drama	Jack Brown	BBC2 drama
2011	Spooks	Drama	Sasha Gavrik	Also known as MI-5
2012	World Without End	Historical Drama	Merthin Fitzgerald	Mini-series
2012–2013	Copper	Historical Drama	Detective Kevin Corcoran	TV series, 23 Episodes
2015	Not Safe for Work	Comedy-drama	Anthony	TV series, 6 Episodes
2015–2016	Dickensian	Drama	Meriwether Compeyson	TV series, 20 Episodes
2018	Troy: Fall of a City	Mini-series	Hector	TV series
2018	The Terror	Mini-series	Lt. Graham Gore	TV series
2021	Grace	Mini-series	Michael	TV series
2019–2023	Warrior	Action	Richard Lee	TV series, 30 episodes
2021	Shadow and Bone	Fantasy	General Zlatan	3 episodes
2022	Sanditon	Drama	Colonel Lennox	TV series

=== Stage ===
Year	Title	Author	Role	Director	Location
2010	Translations	Brian Friel	Doalty	Roger Haines	The Tobacco Factory, Bristol
2010	Enlightenment	Shelagh Stephenson	Adam	Edward Hall	Hampstead Theatre
2014–15	The Merchant of Venice	William Shakespeare	Bassanio	Rupert Goold	Almeida Theatre
2016	Labyrinth	Beth Steel	Charlie	Anna Ledwich	Hampstead Theatre

== See also ==
- List of British actors
- List of people from Dubai
- List of University of London people
