= List of ReGenesis episodes =

This is a list of episodes from the show ReGenesis.

== Series overview ==
Season	Episodes	Originally released	
Season	Episodes	First released	Last released
1	13	October 24, 2004	January 23, 2005
2	13	March 19, 2006	June 11, 2006
3	13	April 1, 2007	June 17, 2007
4	13	March 2, 2008	May 25, 2008

== Episodes ==
=== Season 1 (2004–05) ===
No. overall	No. in season	Title	Directed by	Written by	Original release date
1	1	"Baby Bomb"	John L'Ecuyer	Avrum Jacobson & Jason Sherman	October 24, 2004
It's a race against time to identify the cause of a deadly virus, spreading rapidly and headed straight for the city. It's up to NorBAC to identify patient zero and contain the outbreak. As if a deadly virus wasn't enough, NorBAC's Chief Scientist, David Sandström must deal with the unexpected arrival of his belligerent teenage daughter, Lilith, and arguments with NorBAC's Executive Director Caroline Morrison over the security clearance of the one member of his team he'll need the most, his top virologist.
2	2	"Spare Parts"	Don McBrearty	Jason Sherman	October 24, 2004
Lilith befriends Mick, who is dying and desperate for David to help him discover if he really is a clone and possibly save his life. Meanwhile, NorBAC has managed to locate patient zero and must proceed with the interrogations at "Hazmat City". Was this an act of bioterrorism? Caroline is determined to find out who's responsible as more die and one more is exposed. Mick turns to Lilith, who helps him steal evidence from the scientist who cloned him, his own father.
3	3	"The Face of God"	John L'Ecuyer	Tom Chehak	October 31, 2004
Caroline suggests that Hira has possible terrorist links and shuts her out of NorBAC. David must bring Hira back. But when he does he's confronted with a rally outside NorBAC, led by a fanatical reverend who claims that Christ can be genetically resurrected with a nail from the True Cross. The reverend wants him to prove it, but David isn't interested in playing God. In the frenzy, shots are fired and someone is hit.
4	4	"Prions"	Don McBrearty	Tom Chehak	November 7, 2004
NorBAC investigates an outbreak of prion disease (mad cow) in humans. The victims are spread out across North America. How are the cases connected? In the aftermath of Hiras's death, David is determined to expose the fraudulent reverend from episode 3. David suspects his old friend Danny, a hockey player, is using a dangerous performance-enhancing steroid.
5	5	"The Oldest Virus"	John L'Ecuyer	Avrum Jacobson	November 14, 2004
As the search continues for the source of the deadly prions, NorBAC zeros in on a large agribusiness they suspect of selling infected chickens. David tries to convince Danny to stop playing hockey to protect his heart from the flawed gene therapy drug he has taken. Caroline insists that David interview Jill Langston for the vacated virologist position at NorBAC. His reluctance turns to lust when he meets her.
6	6	"The Trials"	Don McBrearty	Chris Philpott	November 21, 2004
NorBAC reviews an experimental treatment being used on children with leukemia. Just as they are about to declare the cancer therapy safe, another child dies. David disregards the proper channels and goes to Nunavut to get a sample of what he believes is the Spanish flu virus from a frozen corpse. Mick and Lilith go whale-watching in Quebec, but Lilith begins to realize just how sick he is.
7	7	"Faint Hope"	Don McBrearty	Lara McKinnon	November 28, 2004
Carlos Serrano, the Senior Researcher at NorBAC wants to help a friend dying of AIDS participate in cutting edge research. He convinces David to help supply a Houston lab with contraband stem cells in order for his friend to be the first guinea pig for this radical gene therapy. When another child dies, David is determined to find out why the cancer treatment isn't working.
8	8	"Blackout"	John L'Ecuyer	Jason Sherman	December 12, 2004
A major power blackout on the Eastern Seaboard leads to fears of terrorist activity. NorBAC determines that a plastic eating bacterium caused the blackout and they must stop it before more blackouts occur. David and Lilith's mother (Julie Stewart), rekindle old animosities when she comes to town to help Lilith deal with Mick's death. Caroline is worried about the possibility of having breast cancer. Bob tells David he has been approached with another job offer.
9	9	"The Secret War"	John L'Ecuyer	Avrum Jacobson	December 19, 2004
Mayko Tran, NorBAC's bioinformatics researcher, notifies the team at NorBAC about a case of privately contracted civilians who have all returned from Iraq exhibiting a wide range of mysterious illnesses. Meanwhile, Carlos asks NorBAC to investigate multiple cases of hemophilia in a small community in Mexico, where a large multi-national laboratory is working on GMOs. Jill must defend her reputation as a top virologist when a research paper she published is refuted.
10	10	"The Source"	Jerry Ciccoritti	Avrum Jacobson	January 2, 2005
In the continued investigation of the "Iraq War Syndrome", David checks out a theory that the water purification system has malfunctioned. In Mexico, Jill and Carlos make a connection between a hybrid plant designed to detect land mines and the hemophilia epidemic. When that theory fails, David joins them in Mexico and explores the possibility that mosquitoes bred to eliminate malaria might be responsible. Bob quits NorBAC to pursue his love of perfume creation. Caroline receives the diagnosis she's been waiting for.
11	11	"The Promise"	Jerry Ciccoritti	Tom Chehak	January 9, 2005
NorBAC has been taken over by a joint command to deal with a catastrophic smallpox scenario. Bob tries to find a cure for his dog that is suffering from histiocytosis. Jill comes clean with David about taking medication for her panic attacks. David discovers that the earlier "Miranda Virus" outbreak might be linked to the U.S. government's secret bio-chemical lab and that whoever manufactured the "Miranda Virus" may possess another, even more lethal, biological weapon.
12	12	"Resurrection"	John L'Ecuyer	Tom Chehak	January 16, 2005
David and Jill make a trip to Colorado where a rampant SARS-like outbreak is occurring. David is in shock when he discovers that the outbreak is Spanish flu, the virus he dug up in Nunavut. Racked with guilt, he walks into the path of a car and is sent to hospital in a coma before he tells anybody his fears. Mayko heads to Colorado to try to find Patient Zero.
13	13	"The Longest Night"	John L'Ecuyer	Jason Sherman	January 23, 2005
Jill goes to Canada to see if the Spanish flu body is still in the ground. David recovers from his coma and limps back to the office. Daisy recognizes the person who created the Miranda virus and infected her baby. David identifies the vector for the Spanish flu epidemic and tracks it with GPS.

=== Season 2 (2006) ===
No. overall	No. in season	Title	Directed by	Written by	Original release date
14	1	"China"	John L'Ecuyer	Avrum Jacobson	March 19, 2006
After a self-imposed exile to China, David Sandström is kidnapped by the People's Liberation Army and ordered to secretly investigate a deadly outbreak that has killed 19 people in a small village. With the help of three Chinese scientists, David discovers the outbreak has been caused by an ancient bacterium that has seeped into the village's water system. David is horrified when he learns that one of the scientists has decided to test the antidote on herself in order to expedite a cure. While David makes his way back to Canada, Caroline and Carlos are witness to a horrific attack at the site of the International AIDS Conference.
15	2	"Escape Mutant"	Bruce McDonald	Tracey Forbes	March 26, 2006
David Sandström searches for a drug cocktail to save Audrey Graves, a pregnant woman who has been infected with a new strain of HIV from Africa. In an effort to save her baby, Audrey is induced at just 26 weeks; but it is too late, she has progressed to AIDS and her baby has been exposed to the virus. Carlos attempts to trace the new strain of HIV back to Patient Zero and he encounters many painful memories of his own time in Africa. Meanwhile, Mayko recruits Simon Jessup (Darren Boyd), a British neuroscientist, to help her investigate a possible link between IQ spikes and Mad Cow disease. Mayko and Simon begin to develop a personal relationship.
16	3	"The Cocktail"	John L'Ecuyer	Kelly Senecal & Tracey Forbes	April 2, 2006
David has less than two days to discover a drug cocktail that will prevent a premature baby from becoming HIV positive. After he discovers a mixture that will save the baby, he encounters a number of bureaucratic roadblocks because the drug has not been approved. Carlos continues to research the new super strain of HIV with former colleagues in Africa, and realizes that his place is at NorBAC. Mayko and Simon's investigation of dramatic IQ spikes in children who have been exposed to prion-laced chicken takes them to the United States. They make a brilliant finding but the results are devastating. Meanwhile, Mayko is troubled by some news she discovers about Simon.
17	4	"Dim & Dimmer"	Bruce McDonald	Jason Sherman	April 9, 2006
While attending a conference in New York, David chases a petty thief named Owen (Michael Seater) into the city's abandoned subway tunnels where he finds an underground community of homeless people. David discovers that some of the inhabitants share symptoms of a mysterious illness and he begins to investigate. Back at NorBAC, Jill believes that she has discovered a cure for juvenile diabetes from an unsanctioned line of Korean stem cells. Caroline's nephew Glenn who has been lying in a coma is beginning to show some signs of response.
18	5	"Massive Changes"	Clement Virgo	David Young	April 16, 2006
Jill's potential cure for juvenile diabetes is compromised, causing protesters to demonstrate outside NorBAC. To further complicate matters, Jill discovers that the stem cells she used may be infected with a retrovirus; the implications of which would be felt the world over. Carlos and Mayko continue to test two critically ill, homeless people David found living in New York 's subway tunnels. Their symptoms can't be linked to any known disorder; however, they may be connected to a marijuana-growing operation run by the homeless community. Meanwhile, NorBAC is briefed on a strike by the U.S. Government on Cuban labs that may be responsible for the devastation of 1500 acres (6 km^{2}) of orange groves in Florida and David gets devastating news from his father in Vancouver.
19	6	"Our Man in Havana"	John L'Ecuyer	Tom Chehak	April 23, 2006
While dealing with his mother's recent death in British Columbia, David is asked to travel to Florida and Cuba with Carlos. NorBAC has been asked to investigate the claim of exiled Cuban millionaire Salvador Charringa, that his Florida orange groves have been destroyed by a biologically engineered bacterium known as x fastidiosa. When it starts to look like every major institute in Cuba is clean, David speculates that Charringa and the White House are trying to start a conspiracy to justify the invasion of Cuba. Just as tensions between the U.S. and Cuba are about to come to a head, David and Carlos, with the help of Cuban scientist Eva Ramone, discover exactly what the White House and Charringa have been looking for. Believing that Glenn is beginning to emerge from his coma, Bob enlists the help of neuroscientist Simon Jessup to determine a prognosis.
20	7	"Talk to Him"	John L'Ecuyer	David Young	April 30, 2006
While in Cuba investigating the cause of decimated orange groves in Florida, David and Carlos uncover information that points to a possible bio-terrorist plot on the part of the Cubans. The American President jumps the gun and immediately blames Cuba for the damaged crops. In her search for a cure for Juvenile Diabetes, Jill confirms that the Korean stem cell line is contaminated with a virus. Before her ground-breaking results can move forward, she must prove that the virus is harmless. Back in Toronto, Caroline's nephew Glenn fails to respond to his surgery, but does manage to utter one last, devastating message. Owen shows up at David's apartment looking for a place to stay.
21	8	"Haze"	John L'Ecuyer	Tom Chehak	May 7, 2006
Bob's attention turns to the escalating danger in the skies over Mexico City where a massive brown cloud has begun to combine with toxic emissions from a nearby volcano. The new mixture could rain sulfuric acid down on the city and Bob must try to convince the Mexican officials of the gravity of the situation before all of Mexico City is destroyed. Homeland Security is monitoring two scientists in Chicago who they believe are a threat to the U.S. president. After testing samples taken from their lab, David feels the investigation is unwarranted. Caroline, however, can't shake the feeling that something is wrong. Ultimately, there's not enough evidence to detain the brothers and they are set free – but at what cost? Owen shows up at David's office looking for advice on what to do about the people looking for him after he destroyed the marijuana grow-op.
22	9	"Gene in a Bottle"	Ron Murphy	Tracey Forbes	May 14, 2006
NorBAC's investigation into a cluster of suicides occurring in the southern United States uncovers an unnatural enzyme in the brains of the victims. They are receiving something from their environment, and it's causing sudden and severe depression, but where is the enzyme coming from? Meanwhile, the wife of a longtime scientist-friend of David who was killed in a car accident asks David to decipher the secret project her husband had been working on. With the help of Bob and Carlos, David discovers that his friend was genetically engineering mice. They soon deduce that he had discovered the gene that causes homosexuality and had initiated a patent for a drug that would suppress the gene! Bob scrambles to neutralize the Asian Brown Cloud before it dumps a deadly shower of sulfuric acid on Mexico City; and Owen shows up at David's apartment stoned on crystal meth but David decides to give him one more chance to clean up his act.
23	10	"The Wild and Innocent"	John L'Ecuyer	Avrum Jacobson	May 21, 2006
Autopsies on a dead deer lead NorBAC to suspect that worms from parasitic eggs are responsible for a recent spike in depression-related suicides in the Southern U.S. What they can't figure out is if the parasites are coming from the deer, humans or a third source. While working on a retrovirus, Jill becomes contaminated and is forced into quarantine. Owen is charged with criminal negligence when a young girl dies after overdosing on crystal meth. David comes to his defense, arguing that Owen is predisposed to being an addict. The defense sparks a fascinating legal, scientific, and ethical argument.
24	11	"Fishy"	Ken Girotti	Jocelyn Cornforth (idea by Jason Sherman)	May 28, 2006
NorBAC must unravel a genetic mystery when fish bred in an East Coast fish farm start exhibiting unexpected and dangerous mutations. Furthermore, a number of kids in an East Coast village are becoming ill; could deadly radiation be leaking into the Ocean? The team continues to work on a promising anti-parasitic drug after a spike in Arkansas's suicide rate is traced to worms brought into the state on the winds of Hurricane Katrina. Caroline is in Washington being briefed about a new looming crisis – an entire National Guard unit has fallen unconscious and can't be woken up. The illness resembles encephalitis lethargica, but the patients aren't responding to usual treatments. The U.S. military suspects the illness is the work of a radical Muslim group. Meanwhile, Jill is released from quarantine and quickly sent home to rest.
25	12	"Lethargica"	John L'Ecuyer	Avrum Jacobson	June 4, 2006
NorBAC uses innovative scientific methods to track the source of mutating radiation that is affecting fish on the East Coast of Canada to radioactive fuel rods that were dumped into the Ocean in the 1950s. The environmental fall out could be catastrophic. Jill is rushed to the hospital, where doctors struggle to save her life. Meanwhile, National Guardsmen in the U.S. continue to deteriorate. To David's surprise, Jill's symptoms match those of the soldiers. How could the retrovirus Jill found in her stem cells have also infected the soldiers? The U.S. military may have the answer in an untested antidote, but refuse to release it in time to save Jill's life. Once again David is forced to ignore protocol by administering Jill with the untested antidote. David contemplates a radical experiment on his father who is in the early stages of Alzheimer's.
26	13	"The End"	Ken Girotti	Avrum Jacobson	June 11, 2006
Jill and the U.S. National Guardsmen begin to recover after receiving the lethargica antidote; but shortly thereafter, the Guardsmen begin to fall ill again with a secondary more deadly infection. Some Guardsmen begin to die and everyone fears for Jill's life. Caroline believes that her superiors aren't telling her everything about the lethargica outbreak and suspects that Wes, her executive assistant might also be in on it. Out of nowhere, the Manford brothers show up at David's apartment and shed some light onto the recent epidemic. As Caroline continues to dig, she gets dangerously close to unearthing a conspiracy that could go deep into the White House.

=== Season 3 (2007) ===
No. overall	No. in season	Title	Directed by	Written by	Original release date
27	1	"A Spontaneous Moment"	Ken Girotti	Tom Chehak	April 1, 2007
David and Bob investigate simultaneous explosions that incinerated a high tech lab and several of its employees; new virologist Rachel Woods studies the DNA of a gay-basher suspected of killing a fellow student.
28	2	"Dust in the Wind"	Ken Girotti	Tom Chehak	April 1, 2007
David and Bob become ticking time bombs after ingesting the same deadly bacteria combination that incinerated the Greenway scientists; an anomaly in the genetic makeup of gay-basher Julie Henshaw temporarily puts Rachel off track.
29	3	"Strangers in the Night"	John L'Ecuyer	Avrum Jacobson	April 15, 2007
A West Nile-like virus is breaking out in San Francisco, but it's showing some abnormal traits. NorBAC faces budget cuts on the U.S. side; a scientist at the University of Toronto claims to be able to help Owen with his addiction.
30	4	"I Dream of Genomes"	John L'Ecuyer	Avrum Jacobson	April 15, 2007
Outbreaks of a deadly virus in San Francisco and Boston have NorBAC scrambling to find a Patient Zero; Owen wastes away in a jail as David and Angelica argue over his treatment options.
31	5	"The God of Commerce"	Ron Murphy	Kate Miles Melville	April 22, 2007
NorBAC traces the Sinatra virus to an organ donor in the Philippines; massive mercury contamination in Washington State's pristine wilderness leads the team to suspect an underlying cover-up in the government; Mayko experiences phantom limb pain.
32	6	"Phantoms"	Ron Murphy	Tanya Grout	April 29, 2007
Mayko tries to get rid of the pain she's feeling in her phantom limb; the team investigates the high level of mercury contamination found in Lake McGraw.
33	7	"One Hand Washes the Other"	Clement Virgo	Cal Coons	May 6, 2007
NorBAC searches for the source of a resistant strain of c. difficile; despite his limited vision, Bob proves to be an asset to the team.
34	8	"Sleepers"	Clement Virgo	Cal Coons	May 13, 2007
Forest fires in British Columbia are releasing deadly toxins consistent with biological terrorism; Bob struggles to stay useful to NorBAC after a diagnosis of stage three glaucoma; Rachel's charismatic son, Craig, catches the attention of Mayko and Carlos.
35	9	"Let It Burn"	Shawn Alex Thompson	David S. Young	May 20, 2007
A weaponized biological agent was released during fires on the west coast, NorBAC must find the creator of the agent. However, Rachel is more worried about her son who was attacked by a bear while researching a sudden change in their behavior.
36	10	"Unbearable"	Gail Harvey	Jason Sherman	May 27, 2007
NorBAC has been tapped by Riddlemeyer. While trying to discover what caused the bear to attack Craig, a human is discovered with the same behavioral problems. David and Bob make a decision about Bob's eyesight.
37	11	"Adrift"	John L'Ecuyer	Avrum Jacobson	June 3, 2007
Weston is affected by LSD. Bob has his operation but the results are inconclusive. There is an outbreak of an epidemic on a ship and Carlos gets contaminated.
38	12	"Jacobson's Organ"	Ron Murphy	David S. Young	June 10, 2007
Fears arise that Carlos may have been infected with Crimean Congo Hemorrhagic Fever; after experimental surgery that improves his vision, Bob becomes hypersensitive to the emotions of others; Carlton comes under scrutiny when a magnetobacteria threatens the country's electronic infrastructure.
39	13	"Back to the Future"	John L'Ecuyer	Tom Chehak	June 17, 2007
NorBAC discovers a link between the tantalum contamination and the recent smallpox scam; a viral activation of dormant genes evolves Bob into a higher consciousness.

=== Season 4 (2008) ===
No. overall	No. in season	Title	Directed by	Written by	Original release date
40	1	"TB or not TB"	Jerry Ciccoritti	David Young	March 2, 2008
Bob is put into a coma to reduce the risk of infection resulting from the brain surgery; David and Carlos investigate a drug-resistant strain of TB; Rachel and Mayko investigate a rash of horrific injuries due to an inability to feel pain.
41	2	"La Consecuencia"	Jerry Ciccoritti	Meredith Vuchnich	March 9, 2008
David returns to Mexico to find Carlos; Mayko and Rachel get a lead in the mysterious outbreak in Hudson; Bob comes out of a medically induced coma with little memory of what happened to him at Roth's lab.
42	3	"Hep Burn and Melnikov"	John L'Ecuyer	Tom Chehak	March 16, 2008
Wes is accidentally scratched by a needle tainted with a genetically engineered, virulent strain of Hepatitis C.
43	4	"The Kiss"	John L'Ecuyer	Peter Smith	March 23, 2008
Bob continues to be haunted by memories of his time at Roth's lab; Wes insists that Rachel treat him with an experimental drug; a disease that's causing brain inflammation in a small town appears to be contagious.
44	5	"Suspicious Minds"	Clement Virgo	Shelley Eriksen	March 30, 2008
After an experimental treatment nearly kills him, Wes reconsiders his job with NorBAC; a city councilor claims his daughter was poisoned by Muslim extremists.
45	6	"Race Fever"	Clement Virgo	Ian Carpenter	April 6, 2008
NorBAC investigates a mysterious outbreak among cyclists competing in the Tour Cyclo Quebec; Bob embarks on a controversial treatment to deal with his brain infection.
46	7	"Hearts and Minds"	Kelly Makin	Avrum Jacobson	April 13, 2008
A pharmaceutical company comes under fire when its new drug triggers a high incidence of congestive heart failure; David attempts to find a replacement for Wes; Bob suffers a seizure that triggers memories of a woman named Nina.
47	8	"Brood 14"	Kelly Makin	Graham Clegg	April 20, 2008
Bob tracks down Nina, but he makes a discovery that suggests the experiment on Nina is about to go terribly wrong; the team investigates unusual crow attacks.
48	9	"Unbottled"	James Allodi	Avrum Jacobson	April 27, 2008
A terrorist cell takes over the NorBAC lab and forces the scientists to produce a deadly measles mutation.
49	10	"What It Feels Like"	Farhad Mann	Shelley Eriksen	May 4, 2008
David ignores protocol and hires a new virologist, Enuka; Mayko is contacted by the parents of a sick child; as Nina becomes increasingly violent, the scientists try to find a way to deactivate her Jacobson's Organ.
50	11	"Bloodless"	John L'Ecuyer	Tom Chehak	May 11, 2008
When Enuka's nephew is murdered, forensic evidence leads the NorBAC team to investigate the unlikely existence of a prehistoric cat; a dramatic development complicates NorBAC's plans to deactivate Nina's Jacobson's Organ.
51	12	"The Sounds of Science"	Cal Coons	Avrum Jacobson	May 18, 2008
David discovers that Roth has given world leaders a stem cell treatment that leads to violent paranoia; while investigating an outbreak in Moldova, Carlos uncovers a horrific act of atrocity.
52	13	"The Truth"	John L'Ecuyer	Tom Chehak	May 25, 2008
A glimpse into the future renews David's determination to stop the birth of the first human clone.
