= The Eiger Sanction (film) =

1975 film by Clint Eastwood

- Theatrical release poster by John Alvin
- Directed by: Clint Eastwood
- Screenplay by: Hal Dresner; Warren B. Murphy; Rod Whitaker
- Based on: The Eiger Sanction; 1972 novel by Trevanian
- Produced by: Robert Daley
- Starring: Clint Eastwood; George Kennedy; Vonetta McGee; Jack Cassidy
- Cinematography: Frank Stanley
- Edited by: Ferris Webster
- Music by: John Williams
- Production company: The Malpaso Company
- Distributed by: Universal Pictures
- Release date: May 21, 1975
- Running time: 129 minutes
- Country: United States
- Language: English
- Budget: $9 million
- Box office: $14.2 million

The Eiger Sanction is a 1975 American action film directed by and starring Clint Eastwood. Based on the 1972 novel The Eiger Sanction by Trevanian, the film is about Jonathan Hemlock, an art history professor, mountain climber, and former assassin once employed by a secret government agency, who is blackmailed into returning to his deadly profession for one last mission.

Hemlock agrees to join an international climbing team in Switzerland (which is planning an ascent of the Eiger north face) to avenge the murder of an old friend. The Eiger Sanction was produced by Robert Daley for Eastwood's Malpaso Company, with Richard D. Zanuck and David Brown as executive producers, and co-starred George Kennedy, Vonetta McGee, and Jack Cassidy.

Principal photography started on August 12, 1974, and ended in late September 1974. The picture was filmed on location on the Eiger mountain and Zürich in Switzerland, in Monument Valley and Zion National Park in the American Southwest, and in Carmel-by-the-Sea and Monterey in California. Special equipment and handheld cameras were employed to film the climbing sequences. Eastwood did his own climbing and stunt work under dangerous conditions. Twenty-six-year-old British climber David Knowles, a member of the crew, died on the Eiger during the production. The film score was composed by John Williams.

The Eiger Sanction was released in New York City on May 21, 1975, and received mixed reviews. The general reaction among many reviewers offered criticism of the story and screenplay, and praise for the climbing footage and action sequences. The film, which was made with a budget of $9 million, earned $14.2 million at the box office. The Eiger Sanction was first released on DVD in 1998 and on Blu-ray in 2015 by Universal Studios.

== Plot ==
Art professor and mountaineer, Jonathan Hemlock, is a retired government assassin called on to return to work for two more "sanctions", a euphemism for officially approved killings. During his career with a secret government agency called C-2, Hemlock amassed a private collection of 21 rare masterpiece paintings, paid for from his previous sanctions. The director of C-2, Dragon, is an albino ex-Nazi confined to semi-darkness and kept alive by blood transfusions. Dragon requests Hemlock to kill two men responsible for the death of another government agent, code name Wormwood. Insisting he is retired, Hemlock refuses until Dragon threatens to expose Hemlock's art collection to the Internal Revenue Service. Hemlock relents, and travels to Zürich, where he carries out the first sanction by killing two hitmen for $20,000, twice his usual fee (equivalent to $131,000 in 2025), and a letter guaranteeing him that he would receive no trouble from the IRS.

While on his flight from Europe, Hemlock meets air stewardess Jemima Brown, unbeknownst to him a C-2 courier, who seduces him. While he is asleep, she steals his money and IRS exemption letter. Dragon agrees to return them if Hemlock completes the second sanction. Hemlock is reluctant, but accepts the offer when he discovers that the C-2 agent that was killed, Wormwood, was in fact his old friend Henri Baq. Hemlock is an ex-Green Beret, and he and Baq had served together during the Vietnam War, where Baq saved his life. Dragon agrees to pay him $100,000 (equivalent to $653,000 in 2025) plus expenses, and tells him the target is a member of an international mountain-climbing team that will soon attempt an ascent of the north face of the Eiger mountain in Switzerland. Hemlock will be the American member of the team, and must kill one of the climbers; Dragon is uncertain of the target's identity other than the man walks with a limp.

Hemlock travels to Arizona to train at a climbing school run by a close friend, Ben Bowman, who whips him back into shape with the help of an attractive Native American woman named George. Hemlock also encounters an enemy, Miles Mellough, a former ally from the military, who years before had betrayed him in Southeast Asia. Mellough somehow understands a great deal of what Hemlock is planning. He bargains for his life by offering to tell Hemlock which climber is the target. Hemlock rejects, so Mellough tries to kill Hemlock by hiring George to seduce and drug him, but Hemlock survives. Later, Hemlock lures Mellough and his bodyguard miles into the desert, shoots and kills the bodyguard, and leaves Mellough to die in the sun.

Hemlock travels to Switzerland with Bowman, the supervisor for the climb, and meets the other three climbers at the Hotel Bellevue des Alpes, in view of the Eiger. The headstrong and condescending German member, Karl Freytag, presents his proposed route up the mountain, and the team agrees that he will lead the group. The following morning, the men begin their ascent of the Eiger north face, but soon the weather conditions become poor. The older French climber is struck by falling rocks and continues, but dies in his sleep that night. With Hemlock now leading the expedition, the surviving members retreat towards a tunnel window that connects to the Eigerwand railway station, carrying the dead climber between them. At the last moment, climbers Freytag, Meyer, and the body fall off the mountain. Hemlock is saved, dangling alone a few metres from the tunnel window.

Bowman and a rescue crew make their way through the Eiger to the tunnel window, where they attempt to throw a rope to Hemlock. Hemlock notices Bowman is suddenly limping, a sign that identifies him as Hemlock's target. Hemlock says, "You're limping, Ben," reluctant to trust that Bowman will rescue him. Bowman throws him the rope, and Hemlock attaches it, then reluctantly cuts his own rope. He falls onto Bowman's rope, and is pulled safely into the tunnel. On the train ride back, Bowman admits he became involved with "the other side" years earlier, but claims he had no idea that Kruger would kill Henri Baq. Bowman explains he had become involved with Miles Mellough, to whom he was indebted for getting his daughter, George, off drugs.

Back at Kleine Scheidegg, Bowman approaches Hemlock, looking to mend his relationship with him. Hemlock takes a phone call from Dragon, who is convinced that since C-2 was never able to positively identify the target, Hemlock killed all three of the other climbers intentionally to ensure he completed the job. Hemlock tells Bowman that C-2 believes the target froze solid on the mountain, and there is no reason to tell them otherwise. After Bowman leaves, Jemima Brown joins Hemlock and asks him if he really killed all three climbers intentionally. Hemlock just smiles.

== Cast ==
- Clint Eastwood as Jonathan Hemlock
- George Kennedy as Ben Bowman
- Vonetta McGee as Jemima Brown
- Jack Cassidy as Miles Mellough
- Heidi Brühl as Mrs. Montaigne (as Heidi Bruhl)
- Thayer David as Dragon
- Gregory Walcott as Pope
- Reiner Schöne as Karl Freytag (as Reiner Schoene)
- Michael Grimm as Meyer
- Jean-Pierre Bernard as Jean-Paul Montaigne
- Brenda Venus as George
- Candice Rialson as Hemlock's art student
- Elaine Shore as Miss Cerberus
- Dan Howard as Dewayne

== Production ==
=== Development ===
The film is based on the 1972 thriller novel The Eiger Sanction by Trevanian, a pseudonym for Rodney William Whitaker, a University of Texas film professor. It was Trevanian's first novel, and was written as an intentional spoof of James Bond novels. Universal Studios purchased the rights to the film in November 1972, soon after the novel was published. In late November 1972, screenwriter Hal Dresner was hired to adapt the novel with the author Trevanian, credited as Rod Whitaker as a screenwriter. In April 1973, Paul Newman was originally cast in the lead role of Jonathan Hemlock. Dresner and Trevanian prepared two drafts of the screenplay, which were provided to Newman. Disappointed with the results and believing the story was too violent, Newman opted out of the project. In late 1973, Universal producers Richard D. Zanuck and David Brown approached Eastwood with the project.

Eastwood saw serious flaws with the novel and the script, which had gone through three revisions and a rewrite by the time he read it. Eastwood was never interested in espionage as a subject or the spy thriller as a genre, but he was attracted to the project for two reasons. Disappointed with the way Universal handled his first directorial efforts—Play Misty for Me (1971) and Breezy (1973), he was looking to move to Warner Bros, where studio head Frank Wells was offering an open invitation, and Eiger represented a way to close out his contract. More importantly, the project offered Eastwood the opportunity to work in relative isolation on location in Switzerland, away from the distractions of the studio. He was also happy to be surrounded by a small, but efficient cast and crew. On January 31, 1974, Universal announced that Eastwood was contracted to both star in and co-produce The Eiger Sanction with his own Malpaso Productions and Universal Pictures. (Note: At the time, Zanuck said that Eastwood was his "earlier choice" to play Jonathan Hemlock, but scheduling conflicts prevented him from committing to the project. At the time of Eastwood’s official casting, the positions of director and screenwriter were yet unconfirmed.)

In a 1976 interview with author Patrick McGilligan for Focus on Film, Eastwood described the essential problems with the novel: "The book has no ties. In other words, the character that is killed at the beginning has no relationship to anybody else. I just took it and tried to make the guy relate to the hero so the hero had some motivations. The way the book was written, he had no motivations for anything. He just went up there strictly for monetary gain, no other motivation, period."

Believing that improvements could be made to the script, Eastwood contacted novelist Warren B. Murphy — known for his The Destroyer assassin series — in February 1974, and asked for his assistance, despite Murphy never having read the book nor written for a film before. Murphy read the novel and agreed to write the script, but he was unhappy with the novel's tone, which he believed patronized readers. Murphy completed a draft in late March and a revised script a month later. Eastwood also felt that the authenticity of the climbing sequences he envisioned would compensate for the narrative's shortcomings.

From the beginning, Eastwood planned to shoot the mountaineering scenes on location, and that he would do his own climbing without a stunt double. "The challenge of it for me," he would later explain, "was to actually shoot a mountain-type film on a mountain, not on sets. The only ones done in the past were all done on sets; the mountains were all papier-mâché mountains." In late May 1974, Universal announced that Eastwood would also direct the film, and that principal photography was scheduled to start on August 1, 1974, at the Eiger mountain in Switzerland. Universal vice president Jennings Lang would supervise the production.

=== Pre-production ===
As soon as he signed on to the project, Eastwood took complete control of the production. He worked with soundman Peter Pilafian to develop lightweight, disposable batteries to power a specially adapted camera and sound equipment needed to film on the mountain. He also hired Mike Hoover to serve as climbing adviser for the film. Hoover had made an Academy Award-nominated documentary short titled Solo about his lone ascent of El Capitan in Yosemite National Park. Eastwood had seen and admired the documentary, and hired Hoover to train him on how to look professional during the climbing scenes, and to serve as principal cameraman on the more dangerous climbing sequences.

Intent on doing his own climbing for the film, Eastwood accompanied Hoover to Yosemite in early July to train and climb the 1,200-foot (370 m) Lost Arrow Spire, a detached pillar in Yosemite Valley located adjacent to Upper Yosemite Falls. While he had done some rock climbing in his youth, 44-year-old Eastwood was not prepared for the levels of difficulty presented by the climb. Hoover later recalled, "He looked up at me and said, 'Gee, I don't think I can make it.' I said, 'Well, Clint, you really don't have much choice, do you?' Then he reacted characteristically—he got pissed off. He pulled in his chin and gritted his teeth and with absolutely no technique at all, just blood and guts, he mossed his way up. No skill, no brains, just pure muscle."

Meanwhile, George Kennedy, who had recently finished filming Thunderbolt and Lightfoot with Eastwood, was cast as Ben Bowman, Hemlock's friend and former climbing partner. Jack Cassidy was cast as the colorful and flamboyantly gay assassin Miles Mellough. Thayer David was cast as the albino Dragon (named "Yurasis Dragon" in the novel). Just prior to the start of filming, Vonetta McGee was cast as the African-American female C2 operative, Jemima Brown.

In late July 1974, Eastwood, Kennedy, Hoover, and a small crew traveled to Monument Valley—director John Ford's favorite location for his Westerns—on the Arizona-Utah border to film a sequence that would be used in the film to show the main characters doing a practice climb on the Totem Pole, a 640-foot (200 m) rock spire with an 18-foot (5.5 m) diameter. Located within the lands of the Navajo Nation, the Totem Pole has religious significance to the Navajos, who prohibited climbs on the formation.

Nevertheless, Hoover negotiated with the tribal authorities and obtained permission for his team to climb the Totem Pole to remove pitons and other climbing hardware embedded in the structure by previous climbers, restoring the monolith to pristine condition. The ascent was made by two climbers from Moab, Eric Bjornstad and Ken Wyrick, who were tasked with preparing the summit for the helicopter film crew and removing existing hardware. Upon attaining the summit, they were helicoptered off and Eastwood and Kennedy were lowered onto the 18-ft-wide summit for one of Eastwood's happiest moments during the film-making, watching the sun setting over Monument Valley where many classic Westerns were filmed.

=== Filming ===
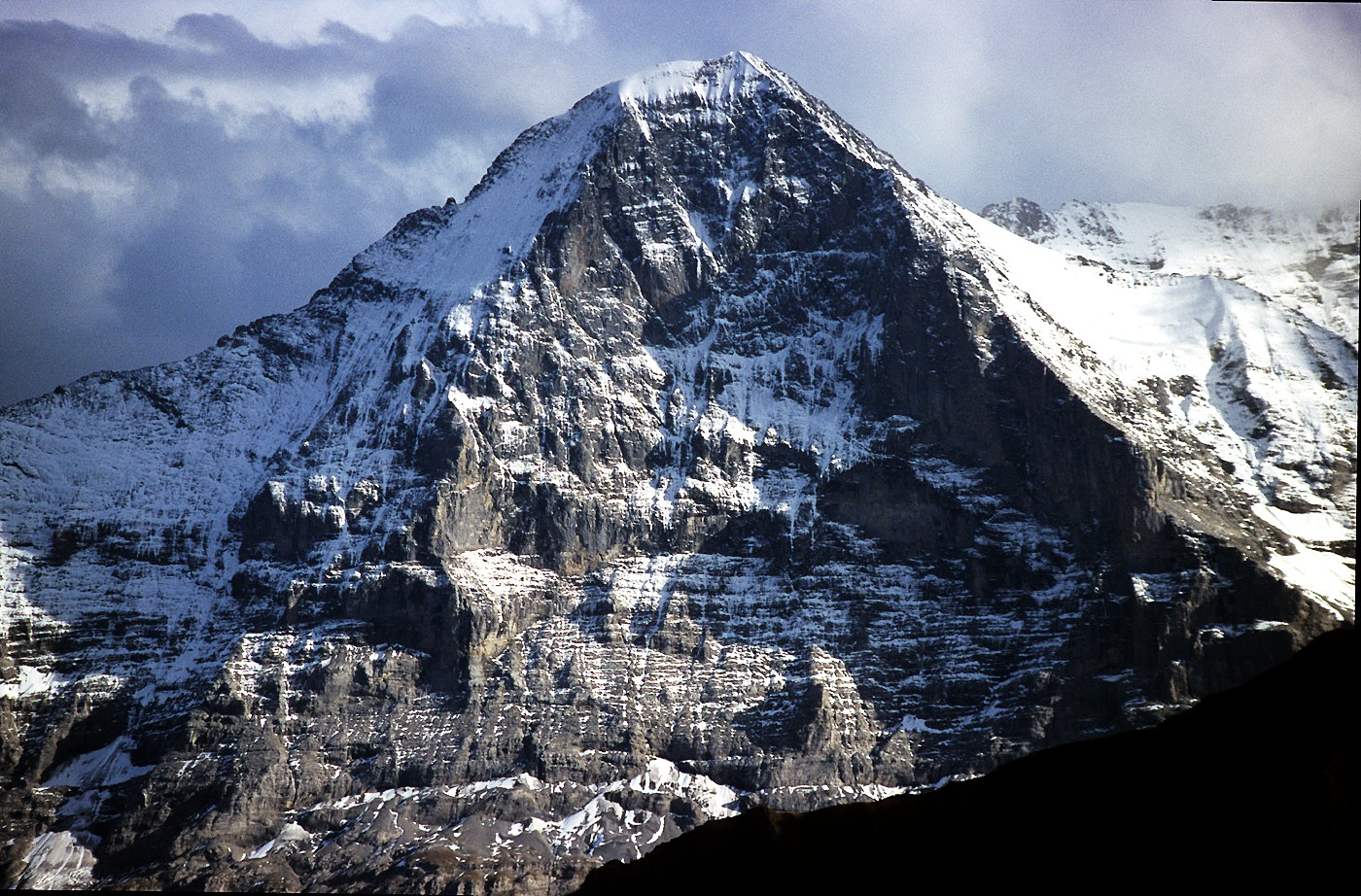
The Eiger north face

Principal photography began on August 12, 1974, in Grindelwald, Switzerland, with a team of climbing experts and advisers from the United States, Canada, Germany, Switzerland, and the United Kingdom. The climbers were based at the Hotel Bellevue des Alpes at Kleine Scheidegg, located below and between the Eiger and Lauberhorn peaks in the Bernese Oberland region. At 13,015 feet (3,967 m) in elevation, the north face of the Eiger, which in one of many interpretations means ogre in German, is renowned for its treacherous climbing, earning the German nickname Mordwand or "murder wall." By 1974, forty one climbers had lost their lives trying to climb the forbidding edifice.

Eastwood decided to take on the most dangerous work during the first two days of shooting. By mid-afternoon on August 13, as light began to fall, a wrap was called after shooting a rock-slide sequence. While the team was preparing to be helicoptered off the north face, Hoover remembered they had not taken any footage from the climbers' point of view of the boulders crashing down on them. With his handheld camera, Hoover and 26-year-old British climber David Knowles rappelled down to the ledge and took the needed footage. As they were gathering their gear, a huge rock broke free and smashed into the climbers, killing Knowles and leaving Hoover with a fractured pelvis and severely bruised muscles. Following an impromptu wake for Knowles, Eastwood considered cancelling the production, but the climbers persuaded him to continue, assuring him that they all knew the risks of their trade and did not want Knowles' death to be meaningless. (Note: Knowles was a skilled climber who worked out of the Dougal Haston International School of Mountaineering in Leysin, Switzerland. He was one of the few crew members who actually climbed the Eiger north face. He was awarded the Royal Humane Society's highest honor for his actions in the 1970 rescue of several stranded climbers in Glencoe, Scotland.)

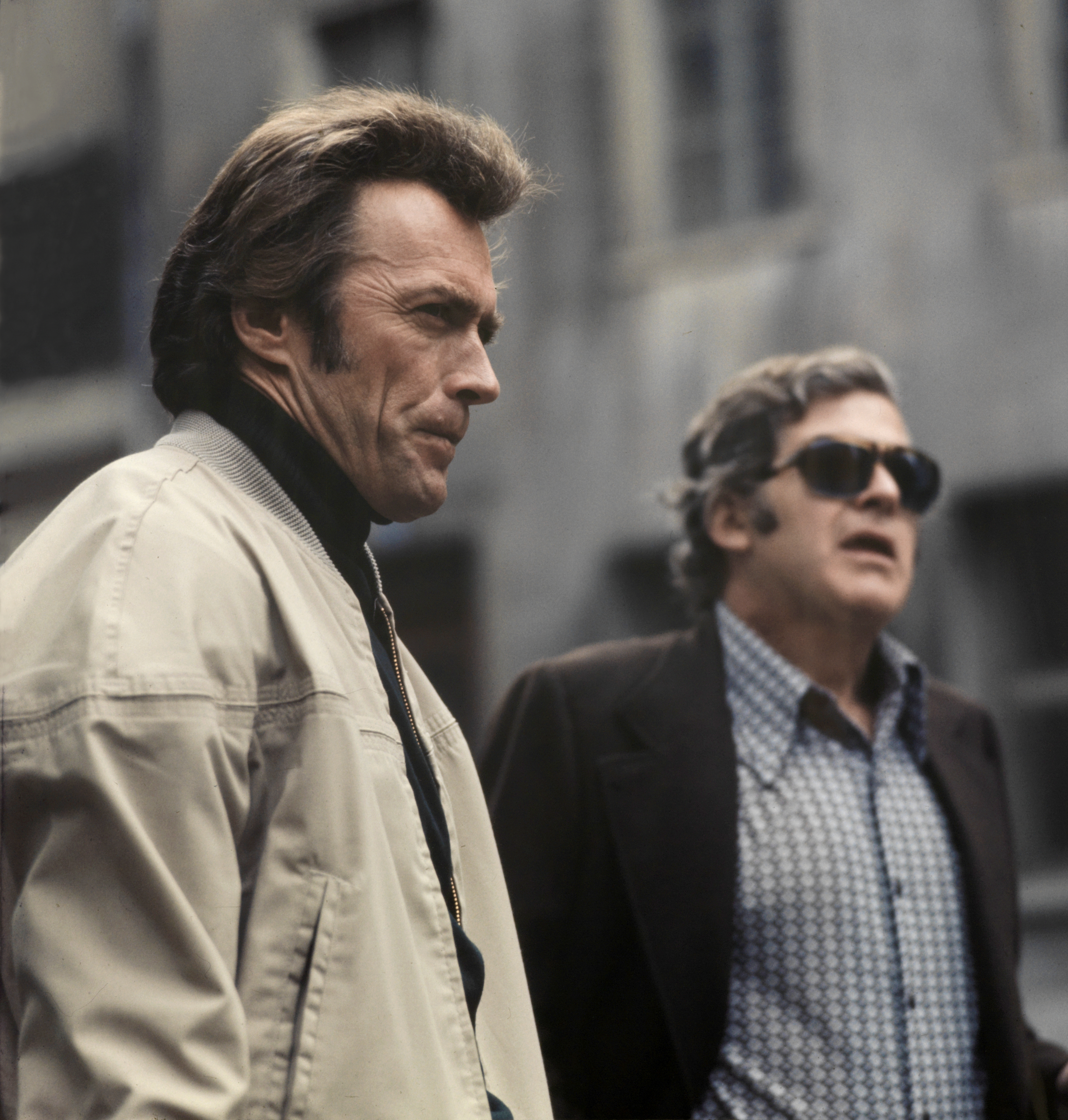
On location in Zürich, Switzerland, September 1974

Eastwood insisted on doing all his own climbing and stunts—a decision met with disapproval by the director of the International School of Mountaineering, Dougal Haston, who experienced the dangers of the Eiger first-hand, having been with American climber John Harlin when he fell to his death. Cameraman Frank Stanley also thought climbing the perilous mountain to shoot a film was unnecessary. While filming on the Eiger, Stanley fell and sustained injuries that forced him to use a wheelchair for some time. Stanley blamed Eastwood for the accident because of lack of preparation, describing him both as a director and actor as a "very impatient man who doesn't really plan his pictures or do any homework."

One of the most dangerous stunts that Eastwood ever attempted involved him hanging from a rope 4,000 feet (1,200 m) above the valley floor in the penultimate scene. The scene required him to cut himself free so he could be pulled to safety by his rescuers. As he cuts the rope supporting his weight, he drops precariously before being saved by a rigged cable. Eastwood later said, "I didn't want to use a stunt man, because I wanted to use a telephoto lens and zoom in slowly all the way to my face—so you could see it was really me." After five weeks at the Eiger, the production unit travelled to Zürich to film the opening scenes of the film around the area of the Grossmünster cathedral and the Limmat River, the Münsterbrücke bridge, the Café Bauschänzli, the Kirchgasse, the Napfgasse, and the Restaurant Karl der Grosse.

Eastwood and company returned to the United States by way of the American Southwest, where filming resumed in Zion National Park in Utah. Scenes were shot at numerous locations including: Zion-Mount Carmel Highway; Zion Lodge; Checkerboard Mesa; the Narrows; the Hanging Gardens; the bridge over the Virgin River, and the Cave Route below the Cerberus Gendarme. Additional scenes were shot in Monument Valley at the Tyrolean Transfer, where a rope had been rigged by climber Eric Bjornstad, who noted that Eastwood was not only very fit, but also very capable when it came to performing physical stunt work. Scenes were also shot at Rock Door Mesa, above Goulding's Lodge, where Eastwood and company stayed. After completing principal photography in late September 1974 in Carmel-by-the-Sea and Monterey in California, Eastwood hosted the cast and crew at his restaurant, the Hog's Breath Inn, for a wrap party. The Eiger Sanction was filmed in Technicolor, and was released to theaters with an aspect ratio of 2.35:1.

== Mountaineering advisors ==
German-Swiss-American mountaineer Norman Gunther Dyhrenfurth was the chief technical advisor for the movie. Other experienced mountaineers who were part of the team included Mike Hoover, Dougal Haston and Hamish MacInnes.

== Soundtrack ==
Eastwood chose John Williams to compose the original music soundtrack for The Eiger Sanction—his only score in the spy thriller genre. A main theme presented initially on piano evokes a sense of sophistication and mystery, then gives a much jazzier or pop rendition reminiscent of Lalo Schifrin's material. The most impressive sections of the score are the grand orchestral cues composed for the mountain scenes—pieces such as "The Icy Ascent" and "The Top of the World" capture both the beauty of the alpine surroundings and the inherent dangers. The latter title presents the kind of rapturous orchestral celebration now commonly associated with Williams' music.

The pseudo-baroque piece "Training with George" presents a string arrangement "demonstrating Williams's remarkable versatility while retaining that musical signature that makes all of his scores so recognizably his," according to writer James Southall. The main theme is reprised in "George Sets the Pace" as a guitar solo with flute harmony. "Microfilm" is a low-key action piece, and "Up the Drainpipe" is pure suspense music—different in tone from the rest of the album. The album concludes with "The Eiger," a triumphant and beautiful finale. Although not considered among Williams' finest scores, The Eiger Sanction soundtrack has a certain stylish allure different from anything else he has done, and is "memorable in some places, beautiful and orchestral in others," according to Southall. The original soundtrack album was released in 1975 on the MCA label. In 1991, it was issued as a CD on the Varèse Sarabande label.

== Reception ==
=== Critical response ===
The Eiger Sanction received mixed reviews upon its theatrical release. The general reaction among many reviewers offered criticism for the story and screenplay, and praise for the climbing footage and action sequences. On Rotten Tomatoes, it holds a score of 68% based on 22 reviews. With a mean of 6.3 of a possible 10. Variety concluded, "Eastwood ... manages fine suspense both in the Swiss and Monument Valley climbs, as well as delineation of character. His direction displays a knowledge that permits rugged action." The New York Times reviewer described the film as "a long, foolish but never boring suspense melodrama" that compensates for its plot shortcomings with "stunning" climbing sequences that look "difficult and very beautiful."

In his review in the Chicago Sun-Times, Roger Ebert gave the film three out of four stars, writing, "It has a plot so unlikely and confused that we can't believe it for much more than 15 seconds at a time, but its action sequences are so absorbing and its mountaintop photography so compelling that we don't care ... and so we get wrapped up in the situations, and we're seduced by the photography, and we enjoy the several pretty girls who happen along in the hero's path, and if the plot doesn't make any sense well, no movie's perfect." Playboy magazine described the film as "a James Bond reject." Some critics were less forgiving, such as Joy Gould Boyum of The Wall Street Journal, who complained that the film "situates villainy in homosexuals and physically disabled men," and Pauline Kael of The New Yorker magazine, who described the film as "a total travesty."

More recent critics have treated the film and Eastwood's direction in a more positive light. Film critic David Sterritt, for example, concluded, "Eastwood's unsubtle directing hammers the story home effectively, with commendable attention to details of performance." In his review on the Combustible Celluloid website, Jeffrey M. Anderson gave the film three and a half out of four stars, calling it "surprisingly effective, even by today's standards." Anderson found the climbing footage "truly gripping" and that the film was "underrated, high-water mark for the great director." Christopher Granger in the Tampa Bay Movie Examiner gave the film four out of five stars, writing, "The scenery in the Alps is breathtaking and the action in this spy thriller is end-of-your-seat viewing." Jason Ivey in the Tea Party Tribune found the later sequences of the film "truly breathtaking" and wrote, "There's simply something more suspenseful, more dramatic, when you know you're watching Clint Eastwood hanging from a rope 1,000 feet above the rocky earth." Ivey concluded:

The images created on screen by Eastwood, his stunt, mountaineering, and camera teams, and the landscapes themselves are incredible. They elevate an otherwise silly plot, marking a moment in movie history when the images committed to film were far more real than today's mix of live action and cartoons. This realness makes films like this compelling in a way today's films can never be.

Professional climber Alex Honnold considers one of the climbing scenes of the film (Eastwood climbing a desert tower) as "the most realistic in all of Hollywood climbing."

=== Box office ===
The film, which was made on a budget of $9 million, earned $14,200,000 at the box office.

== Home media ==
The Eiger Sanction was first released in DVD format on December 15, 1998, by Universal Studios, with subsequent re-releases on April 14, 2003, February 10, 2009, and May 5, 2015. The film was released in Blu-ray format on November 10, 2015, by Universal. In 2024, a 4K Blu-ray was released by Kino Lorber featuring a new HDR/Dolby Vision Master from a 4K scan of the 35mm original camera negative.

== Bibliography ==
- Eliot, Marc (2009). American Rebel: The Life of Clint Eastwood. New York: Harmony Books. ISBN 978-0-307-33688-0.
- Foote, John H. (2008). Clint Eastwood: Evolution of a Filmmaker. Westport: Praeger. ISBN 978-0-313-35247-8.
- Hughes, Howard (2009). Aim for the Heart. London: I.B. Tauris. ISBN 978-1-84511-902-7.
- McGilligan, Patrick (1999). Clint: The Life and Legend. New York: HarperCollins. ISBN 978-0-00-255528-9.
- Schickel, Richard (1996). Clint Eastwood: A Biography. New York: Alfred A. Knopf. ISBN 978-0-679-42974-6.
