= Trevanian =

American film scholar and writer (1931–2005)

- Born: Rodney William Whitaker; June 12, 1931; Granville, New York, U.S.
- Died: December 14, 2005 (aged 74); Somerset, England
- Education: University of Washington; Northwestern University
- Occupation: Novelist
- Writing career
- Genre: Fiction

Rodney William Whitaker (June 12, 1931 – December 14, 2005) was an American film scholar and writer who wrote several novels under the pen name Trevanian. Whitaker wrote in a wide variety of genres, achieved bestseller status, and published under several other names, as well, including Nicholas Seare, Beñat Le Cagot, and Edoard Moran. He published the nonfiction book The Language of Film under his own name.

Between 1972 and 1983, five of his novels sold more than a million copies each. He was described as "the only writer of airport paperbacks to be compared to Zola, Ian Fleming, Poe, and Chaucer." Whitaker adamantly avoided publicity for most of his life, his real name a closely held secret for many years. The 1980 reference book Twentieth-Century Crime and Mystery Writers listed his real name in its Trevanian entry.

== Life ==
Born in Granville, New York, Whitaker became enthralled with stories as a boy. His family struggled with poverty. He lived for several years in Albany, New York, as a youth (a time portrayed in his last published work).

Whitaker earned bachelor's and master's degrees in drama at the University of Washington. While there, he wrote and directed his three-act play Eve of the Bursting, which was his master's thesis production in the UW Playhouse. The company manager and assistant director of the production was Jerry Pournelle. Whitaker went on to earn a doctorate in communications and film at Northwestern University.

He taught at Dana College in Blair, Nebraska, where he was chairman of the communications division. He served in the US Navy during the Korean War. Later, he was awarded a Fulbright scholarship for study in England.

When Whitaker wrote his first two novels, he was chairman of the Department of Radio, TV, and Film at the University of Texas at Austin, where he continued to teach for many years.

Whitaker married the former Diane Brandon, and they had three children: Christian, and daughters Alexandra and Tomasin. They lived for years in the Basque countryside of France. He had a son, Lance, from a previous marriage.

Whitaker died December 14, 2005, in Somerset, England. He was survived by his wife and grown children.

== Literary works ==
Whitaker said his wife chose the pen name Trevanian based on her appreciation of English historian G. M. Trevelyan. Trevanian wrote many bestselling novels in different genres, which received highly favorable critical reviews.

His first novel, published at the age of 40 when he was teaching at the University of Texas, was The Eiger Sanction, a thriller that became a worldwide best seller. In 1974, it was adapted as a movie directed by and starring Clint Eastwood. Trevanian described the movie as "vapid" in a footnote in his later novel Shibumi. He requested (and received) a screenwriting credit as Rod Whitaker. The balance of the script was written by Warren Murphy, the mystery writer perhaps best known for co-writing the Destroyer series of action novels.

Saddened that some critics did not recognize the story as a spoof, Trevanian followed it with a more intense spoof, The Loo Sanction (1973), which depicted an ingenious art theft. Then came The Main (1976), a detective novel set in a poor neighborhood of Montreal, featuring widowed, 50-ish police lieutenant Claude LaPointe. Trevanian originally intended to publish The Main under the pen name Jean-Paul Morin.

Next came Shibumi in 1979, a meta-spy novel, which received the most critical acclaim. In 1983, he published The Summer of Katya, a psychological horror novel. The wide diversity of genres led to a popular theory that "Trevanian" was a collective pen name for a group of writers working together. Under the name Nicholas Seare, Trevanian also published 1339...or So: Being an Apology for a Pedlar (1975), a witty medieval tale of love and courage; and Rude Tales and Glorious (1983), a bawdy retelling of Arthurian tales.

After a 15-year hiatus, Trevanian returned with a Western novel called Incident at Twenty-Mile (1998), and then a collection of short stories, Hot Night in the City (2000). His last published novel, written while he was in declining health, was The Crazyladies of Pearl Street (2005), an autobiographical coming-of-age story of a boy surviving with his mother and sister in the slums of Albany, New York, in the years preceding and during World War II. In November 2005, it was selected as one of 11 Editors' Choice books by the Historical Novel Society.

Street of the Four Winds, Trevanian's tale of Parisian artists caught in the 1848 revolution, based on his research of the era, remains unpublished. An excerpt is posted on Trevanian's web site.

In 2005, Crown Publishers reprinted five of Trevanian's early books—The Eiger Sanction, The Loo Sanction, The Main, The Summer of Katya, and Shibumi—as a trade paperback set.

Whitaker kept his true identity unknown for years. He refused to grant interviews or contribute to the publicity efforts of his publishers. His first known interview was granted to Carol Lawson of The New York Times for a June 10, 1979 article coinciding with the release of Shibumi. In this article, Trevanian stated that "Trevanian is going out of business. Now he can talk."

It was rumored that Trevanian was Robert Ludlum writing under a pen name. Trevanian rejected that idea, stating, "I don't even know who he is. I read Proust, but not much else written in the 20th century."

Trevanian wrote successfully in several genres. In a 1998 interview with Newsweek, he said that with each new book, he first decided what author should tell the story. He used method-acting techniques to imagine himself as the author to work into the story he wanted to tell.

Trevanian said of his fans:

The Trevanian Buff is a strange and wonderful creature: an outsider, a natural elitist, not so much a cynic as an idealist mugged by reality, not just one of those who march to a different drummer, but the solo drummer in a parade of one.

This was another poke at the masses—most notably the United States and Americans in general—since his apparent disillusion with the country led him to abandon it. In later years, Trevanian was more outspoken about the reasons surrounding his voluntary exile from the country of his birth; he cited US material obsession as one of the main reasons behind the declining quality of life in the United States. He said that one day Americans would wake up and realize that cheaper is not necessarily better. Trevanian also addressed the issue of value on his website.

== Non-fiction (as Rod Whitaker) ==
- The Language of Film (1970)
- "Christ on Stage", Dialog 5, Summer 1966, pp. 226–7 (1966).
- "Conversation: On translating Senecan tragedy into film", James Hynd (an interview with Rod Whitaker). Arion (Boston), v. 7 (Spring 1968), pp. 58–67 (1968).
- Stasis. Script to a film by Rod Whitaker and Richard Kooris (1968).
- "The Lawyer, The Lawman, and The Law: Public Image", Texas Law Review: Volume 50, Issue 4. pp. 822–7 (1972).

== Novels ==
=== As Trevanian ===
- The Eiger Sanction (1972)
- The Loo Sanction (1973)
- The Main (1976)
- Shibumi (1979)
- The Summer of Katya (1983)
- Incident at Twenty-Mile (1998)
- Hot Night in the City (2000)
- The Crazyladies of Pearl Street (2005)

=== As Nicholas Seare ===
- 1339...or So: Being an Apology for a Pedlar (1975) (Based on his stage play, Eve of the Bursting)
- Rude Tales and Glorious (1983)

== Short stories ==
- "Switching", Trevanian. Playboy magazine. December 1978. (A revised version of this story appeared in Hot Night in the City as "After Hours at Rick's")
- "Minutes of a Village Meeting", by Beñat Le Cagot, translated by Trevanian. Harper's Monthly. February 1979. pp. 60–63. (A revised version of this story appeared in Hot Night in the City.)
- "That Fox-of-a-Beñat", by Beñat Le Cagot, translated by Trevanian. Yale Literary Magazine. 1984. Vol. 151, No 1, pp. 25–33. (A revised version of this story appeared in Hot Night in the City.)
- "The Secrets of Miss Plimsoll, Private Secretary", by Trevanian. Redbook. March 1984. (A revised version of this story appeared in Hot Night in the City as "The Sacking of Miss Plimsoll".)
- "The Apple Tree", by Trevanian. The Antioch Review, Yellow Springs: Spring 2000. Vol. 58, Iss. 2; p. 195 (14 pages). "The Apple Tree" was also anthologized in the Best American Short Stories collection for 2001.
- "Waking to the Spirit Clock", The Antioch Review, Yellow Springs: Summer 2003. Vol. 61, Issue 3; p. 409.

== Other works ==
- Eve of the Bursting, Rod Whitaker. A drama in three acts, 1959; performed at the University Playhouse at the University of Washington. Whitaker also directed this performance.
- Introduction to the 1998 Re-issue of The Climb Up to Hell by Jack Olsen. 1st Ed. Harper & Row, 1962, New York, 1962. Reprint Edition by Griffin House (St. Martins Press), New York, 1998.
- Editor and Introduction to the short-story mystery collection Death Dance: Suspenseful Stories of the Dance Macabre. Cumberland House, 2002.
- The Crazyladies of Pearl Street Cybernotes Companion (2005)
- The Street of the Four Winds – Part I Internet Edition' (2005)
- Threads for the Emperor, a one-act children's play retelling of The Emperor's New Clothes.
