= Copper (TV series) =

2012 American television drama series

- Genre: Period drama
- Created by: Tom Fontana; Will Rokos
- Starring: Tom Weston-Jones; Kyle Schmid; Anastasia Griffith; Franka Potente; Ato Essandoh; Kevin Ryan
- Composer: Brian Keane
- Country of origin: United States
- Original language: English
- No. of seasons: 2
- No. of episodes: 23 (list of episodes)

Production
- Executive producers: Barry Levinson; Tom Fontana
- Producers: Bran Van Arragon; Glen Salzman
- Production locations: Toronto, Ontario
- Cinematography: Steven Cosens; Paul Sarossy
- Editor: David B. Thompson
- Camera setup: Single-camera
- Running time: 45 minutes
- Production companies: Cineflix Studios; Shaw Media

Original release
- Network: BBC America
- Release: August 19, 2012 – September 22, 2013

Copper is a television drama series created by Tom Fontana and Will Rokos for BBC America. It is set in 1860s New York City, during the American Civil War, and stars Tom Weston-Jones as an Irish immigrant policeman, or "copper", who patrols and resides in the Five Points neighborhood. Other cast members include Kyle Schmid, Ato Essandoh, Anastasia Griffith, Tessa Thompson and Franka Potente.

The series was BBC America's first original scripted program after previously only airing co-productions and shows from the United Kingdom. Fontana, Rokos, Barry Levinson, and Christina Wayne were executive producers of the series.

The first season of 10 episodes premiered on August 19, 2012. The series was renewed for a second season of 13 episodes, which premiered on June 23, 2013. On September 19, 2013, Copper's cancellation was announced, three days before its second-season finale aired.

== Premise ==
The series centers on Kevin "Corky" Corcoran, an Irish immigrant police detective trying to keep the peace in the historical Five Points neighborhood, in 1860s New York City. Initially, he is simultaneously searching for information on his wife, who disappeared, and daughter, who was killed, while he was fighting down south for the Union Army. The show explores the effects of the American Civil War as well as the social stratification involving New York's aristocracy and African American population.

== Cast and characters ==
- Tom Weston-Jones as Detective Kevin "Corky" Corcoran, a rugged Irish immigrant cop in New York City
- Kyle Schmid as Robert Morehouse, the son of a wealthy Fifth Avenue industrialist, formerly Corcoran and Freeman's major in the Union Army
- Ato Essandoh as Matthew Freeman, an African-American physician and runaway slave, who serves as an informal pathologist for Corcoran
- Anastasia Griffith as Elizabeth Haverford, the English wife of a wealthy Fifth Avenue friend of Morehouse's
- Franka Potente as Eva Heissen, a shrewd Prussian businesswoman and madam of a brothel
- Kevin Ryan as Detective Francis Maguire, an Irish immigrant cop working alongside Corcoran
- Dylan Taylor as Detective Andrew O'Brien, an Irish immigrant cop who works with Corcoran and Maguire
- Kiara Glasco as Annie Reilly, a 12-year-old orphaned prostitute
- Tessa Thompson as Sara Freeman, Matthew's wife, a runaway slave whose brothers were lynched by a group of Irishmen
- Alex Paxton-Beesley as Ellen Corcoran, Corky's wife, who disappeared while he served in the Union Army
- Ron White as Captain Ciaran Joseph Sullivan, the commander of the Metropolitan Police Department's Sixth Precinct and Corcoran's boss
- Donal Logue as Brendan Donovan, a Civil War Brigadier General who is the Sixth Ward Tammany Hall boss
- Alfre Woodard as Hattie Lemaster, Sara's mother, a newly freed slave

== Episodes ==
Season	Episodes	Originally released	
Season	Episodes	First released	Last released
1	10	August 19, 2012	October 21, 2012
2	13	June 23, 2013	September 22, 2013

== Production ==
BBC America announced the series during the Television Critics Association (TCA) summer press tour, on July 28, 2011. General Manager Perry Simon said the series is a "great fit" for the network, as it "[captures] the early American multicultural experience in provocative, ground-breaking fashion". Series creators Tom Fontana and Will Rokos are joined as executive producers by Barry Levinson and Cineflix Studios president Christina Wayne. Additional members of the production team include Steven Cosens as director of photography, Delphine White as costume designer, and John Blackie as production designer.

In January 2012, the main cast of the series—comprising Weston-Jones, Schmid, Griffith, and Potente—was unveiled. The actors hail from a variety of backgrounds: Weston-Jones and Griffith are British; Potente is German; and Schmid is Canadian. Irish actor Kevin Ryan and American actress Tessa Thompson also joined as series regulars.

Filming began in January 2012, in Toronto. After naming it their "highest-rated drama series ever", BBC America ordered a second season of 13 episodes, which began airing in June 2013.

== Broadcast ==
Copper premiered August 19, 2012 on BBC America in the United States, and August 26, 2012 on Showcase in Canada. It is also broadcast on FX Australia in Australia and on HBO in the Netherlands. On September 19, 2013, BBC America announced that Copper would end its run after the Season 2 finale, stating that the series had reached "a fitting moment to conclude". A feature film was considered, but so far nothing has happened.

== Soundtrack ==
On May 28, 2013, Valley Entertainment released Copper: Original Soundtrack, with music composed by Brian Keane, worldwide on CD and in digital formats.

== See also ==
- List of fictional portrayals of the NYPD
- List of television shows set in New York City
