= Víctor Santos (author) =

Spanish comics artist (born 1977)

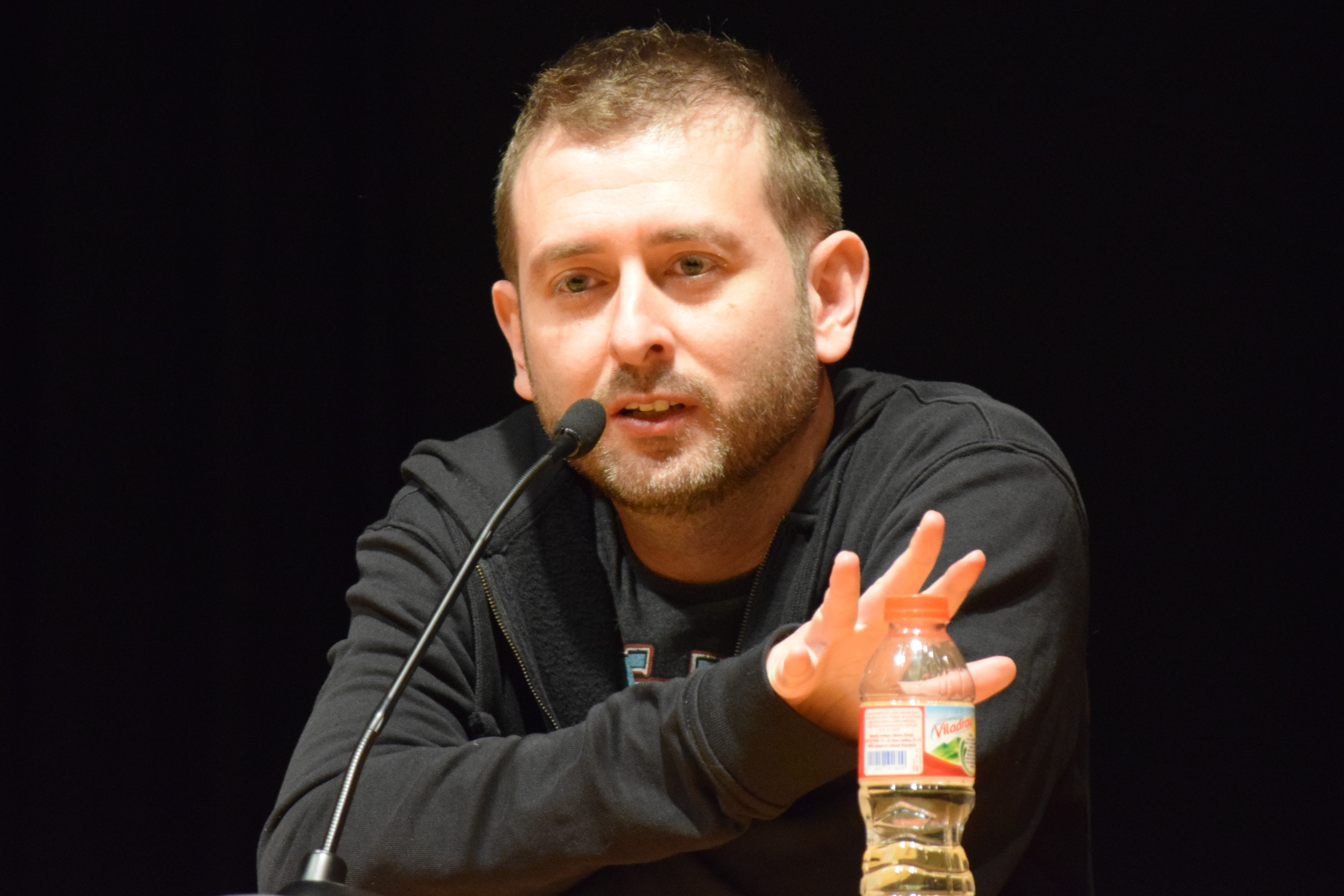
- Born: Víctor Santos Montesinos; 1977 (age 48–49) Valencia
- Areas: Cartoonist, Writer
- Notable works: Los Reyes Elfos; Polar
- Awards: List of awards

Víctor Santos Montesinos (born 1977) is a cartoonist and screenwriter of Valencian comics. In 2002, he won the Prize Josep Toutain a l'Autor Revelació from the Barcelona International Comics Convention. Apart from publishing multiple comics in the Spanish market, he has worked for several American publishers like Image, DC Comics and IDW Publishing. He is one of the most fruitful Spanish authors of his generation and has been highlighted in the fantastic comic and the comic policíac. His largest and emblematic work is the comic series Los Reyes Elfos and is also known for the noir comic series Pulp Héroes. The author usually works as a solo author, but has also worked drawing scripts for other authors (especially for the American market) and as a screenwriter for other cartoonists.

== Early life ==
Santos studied Fine arts and was one of the founding members of the Valencian collective 7 Monos, which included Valencian students of Belles Arts i Arts i Oficis such as Manuel Bartual, Sergio Córdova and Jordi Bayarri.

== Career ==
=== In the Spanish market ===
==== Beginning and Spanish publishers ====
Santos published his first comics as part of the Los 7 Monos collective and immediately his series of fantasy comics Los Reyes Elfos was featured winning the Premi Josep Toutain a Millor Autor Revelació al Saló del Còmic de 2002 i 2003. His first professional publication was this title, first with Dude Comics then Dolmen Editorial, which published the majority of his works until the 2009. Other Spanish publishers that have published his works are Astiberri, Aleta Ediciones, Planet DeAgostini and Recerca Editorial.

Among his published works in the Spanish market, are: Pulp heroes, Protector, Aventuras en el Mundo Jung, Faeric gangs and Lone in heaven. Víctor Santos has screenwritten the three anthologies of Los Reyes Elfos and the albums of comics, LA sangre de las valkirias (drawing from Pere Pérez) and Silhouette (drawn by Jesus Alonso Iglsias).

=== Works in European and United States of America comics ===
In 2006 he began to publish outside Spain: in France (Young Ronins, Ed. Soleil), Italy (Ricca da morire, Black Kaiser and Il sangue delle Valchirie) and in the United States (Image Comics), where he triumphed. To this last market, Víctor Santos published simultaneously three works in 2009, Filthy Rich (Vertigo), Mice Templar: Destiny (Image) and Demon Cleaner (Antarctic Press) and later he worked for the publisher IDW Publishing (Witch & Wizard and Godzila: Kingdom of Monsters) and for Dark Horse Comics (Furious, Dark Horse Present and Polar, Wild Rover).

== Works ==
=== Albums published in Spain ===
Anys	Title	Script	Drawing	Publishing
1999	Gaijin: honor, balas y ex novias	Víctor Santos	Víctor Santos	7 Monos
2000	Los Reyes Elfos	Víctor Santos	Víctor Santos	7 Monos
2001	Los Reyes Elfos: La Doncella y los lobos	Víctor Santos	Víctor Santos	7 Monos
2002	Los Reyes Elfos: Emperatriz del Hielo	Víctor Santos	Víctor Santos	Dude Comics
2003	Pulp Heroes	Víctor Santos	Víctor Santos	Astiberri Ediciones
2003	Los Reyes Elfos: La Espada de los Inocentes	Víctor Santos	Víctor Santos	Dude Comics
2003	Faeric Gangs	Víctor Santos	Víctor Santos	Astiberri Ediciones
2004	Aventuras en el Mundo Jung	Víctor Santos	Víctor Santos	Aleta Ediciones
2004	Protective	Víctor Santos	Víctor Santos	Dolmen Editorial
2005	Los reyes elfos: The doncella y los lobos (re-edición)	Víctor Santos	Víctor Santos	Dolmen/Siurell
2005	Lone in Heaven	Víctor Santos	Víctor Santos	Aleta Ediciones
2005	Los reyes elfos: Hasta los dioses mueren	Víctor Santos	Víctor Santos	Dolmen/Siurell
2005	Pulp héroes 2: Bushido	Víctor Santos	Víctor Santos	Astiberri
2006	Los reyes elfos: Historias de Faerie	Víctor Santos	Víctor Santos	Dolmen/Siurell
2007	Al mejor postor	Víctor Santos	Víctor Santos	Dolmen/Siurell
2007	Works. El Arte de Victor Santos	Víctor Santos	Víctor Santos	Dolmen/Siurell
2008	Young Ronins	Víctor Santos	Víctor Santos	Soleil
2008	Deamon Cleaner	Víctor Santos	Víctor Santos	Dolmen Editorial
2009	Black Kaiser	Víctor Santos	Víctor Santos	Dolmen Editorial
2010	Zombee	Miles Gunter	Víctor Santos	Dolmen Editorial
2010	Silhouette	Víctor Santos	Jesus Alonso Iglesias	Dolmen Editorial
2011	Asquerosamente Rich	Brian Azzarello	Víctor Santos	Panini Comics
2011	Los Reyes Elfos: Dreide	Víctor Santos	Víctor Santos	Dolmen/Siurrell
2012	Ragnarök	Víctor Santos	Pere Pérez	Dolmen Editorial
2012	Ezequiel Himes: Zombie hunter	Víctor Santos	Alberto Hernández	Dolmen Editorial
2012	Silhouette: Arcángeles oscuros	Víctor Santos	Jesus Alonso Iglesias	Panini Comics
2012	Intachable: 30 años de corrupción	Víctor Santos	Víctor Santos	Panini Comics
2012	Rashomon: Un caso del comisario Heigo Kobayashi	Víctor Santos	Víctor Santos	Norma Editorial
2013	Los Reyes Elfos: La saga de Ehren Heldentodsson	Víctor Santos	Víctor Santos	Dolmen Editorial
2013	Los ratones templarios (2)	Brian J. L. Glass, Michael Avon Oeming	Victor Santos, Veronica Gandini	Dolmen Editorial
2014	Los ratones templarios (3)	Brian J. L. Glass	Victor Santos	Dolmen Editorial
2014	Furious Vol. 1	Bryan J.L. Glass	Victor Santos	Aleta Ediciones
2017	Infinity Outrage	Victor Santos	Kenny Ruiz	Corvus Belli

=== Albums published in other countries ===
The albums of comics that Víctor Santos has published to other countries are:

- United States
  - Black Market
  - Polar Came from the cold
  - Furious
  - The Mice Templar. Destiny part 1
  - The Mice Templar. Destiny part 2
  - The Mice Templar. To Mid-Winter Night's Dream
  - The Mice Templar. Legent Childbirth 1
  - Filthy Rich
  - Godzilla. Kingdom of Monsters Wants 2
  - Godzilla. Kingdom of Monsters Wants 3
  - Sleepy Hollow: Providence
  - Witch & Wizard. Battle for Shadowland
  - Witch & Wizard. Operation Zero
  - Zombee
  - Demon cleaner
  - Until My Knuckles Bleed
- Digital publications USES
  - Polar. Came from the Cold
  - Furious
  - The Mice Templar
  - Witch & Wizard
  - Godzila. Kingdom of the Monsters
- France
  - Sale Fric. Filthy Rich
  - Young Ronins. Rentrée des Classes
  - Young Ronins. The offensive Osaki
- Italy
  - Ricca da morire. Filthy Rich
  - Black Kaiser
  - Il sangue delle Valchirie
  - Fahrenheit 451

=== Other works ===
- 1998 - 1999 Gaijin, fascicle of comics of 7 Monos, number 1.
- 1999 - Magia y acero, fascicle of comics of the publisher Anillo of Sirio/Ed. 7 Monos, numbers 1 and 10.
- 1999 - Retales from the Cript, fascicle of comics of 7 Monos, number 1.
- 2000 - 7 Novias para 7 Monos, fascicle of comics of 7 Monos, number 1.
- 2000 - Alien College, fascicle of historietes of 7 Monos, numbers 1 and 2.
- 2000 - Los Reyes Elfos, fascicle of comics of 7 Monos, numbers 1 and 2.
- 2001 - Los Reyes Elfos. La doncella y los lobos, fascicle of historietes of 7 Monos, number 1.
- 2002 - Dude Gold, album of comics of Dude Comics, number 9 (Los Reyes Elfos. The señor of Alfheim).
- 2002 - Mono on the moon, fascicle of historietes, of 7 Monos, nº1.
- 2002 - Extra Dude, fascicle of comics of Dude Comics, numbers 2, 3 and 4.
- 2002 - Les hussards, fascicle of comics of 7 Monos nº2.
- 2002 - Los Reyes Elfos. La emperadriz de hielo, fascicle of comics of Dude Comics, numbers 1, 2, 3 and 4.
- 2003 - Faeric Gangs, album of comics of Astiberri Ediciones, nº1.
- 2003 - Pulp Heroes, album of comics of Astiberri, nº1.
- 2003 - Artículo 20, album of comics of Astiberri/Dolmen Editorial.
- 2003 - Los Reyes Elfos. La espada de los inocentes, album of comics of Dude Comics.
- 2004 - Iberia Book, album of comics of Dolmen Editorial, nº1 (Protective).
- 2004 - Balas perdidas, album of comics of Aleta Ediciones, numbers 5 (Aventuras en el mundo Jung) and 10 (Lone in heaven).
- 2004 - Boom!, fascicle of comics edited by the Asociación de Autores de Cómic de España, nº1.
- 2004 - Fanhunter. The final conflict, album of comics edited by Planet DeAgostini, nº1.
- 2004 - Marzo, en tinta propia, album of comics edited by Marzo, en tinta propia.
- 2005 - Pulp héroes. Bushido, album of comics of Astiberri.
- 2005 - Los Reyes Elfos. La doncella y los lobos, album of comics of Dolmen Editorial, nº1.
- 2005 - Nobanda/Zone Joso, publication with comics edited by Santiago Navarro, numbers 2 (¡Hey Kids!) And 4 (Más que fantásticos).
- 2006 - Los Reyes Elfos. Hasta los Dioses mueren, album of comics of Dolmen Editorial, nº1.
- 2006 - El Mono Maltés, fascicle of comics, of 7 Monos, nº1.
- 2006 - Los Reyes Elfos. Historia de Faerie, albums of comics of Dolmen Editorial, numbers 1, 2 and 3.
- 2006 - Bull Damn City, album of comics of Dolmen Editorial, nº1.
- 2006 - Bull Damn city. El día de la Zarigüeya, album of comics of Dolmen Editorial, nº1.
- 2006 - Agenda FNAC 2007, publication with comics nº1.
- 2007 - GEI (Vol 2), fascicle of historietes of Recerca Editorial, nº1.
- 2007 - Al mejor postor, album of comics of Dolmen Editorial.
- 2007 - Dos veces breve, magazine of comics of Ariadna Editorial, numbers 12 and 18.
- 2007 - Works, publication with comics of Dolmen Editorial, nº2 (Works, el Arte of Víctor Santos).
- 2008 - Los Reyes Elfos. La emperadriz de hielo, album of comics of Dolmen Editorial nº1.
- 2008 - Bull Damn City. Zombies, album of comics of Dolmen Editorial, nº1.
- 2008 - el Manglar, magazine of comics of Dibbuks, numbers 8 and 10.
- 2008 - El Balanzin, fascicle of comics of APIE-EIEP, nº4.
- 2008 - Demon Claner, album of comics of Dolmen Editorial, nº1.
- 2009 - Black Kaiser, album of comics of Planet DeAgostini, nº1.
- 2009 - La sangre de las Valkirias, album of comics of Planet DeAgostini.
- 2009 - Bull DAmn War, album of comics of Dolmen Editorial.
- 2009 - Los Reyes Elfos. Glirenn. La reina de los Elfos Negros, album of comics of Dolmen, nº1.
- 2010 - Zombee, album of comics of Dolmen.
- 2010 - Silhouette, album of comics of Dolmen.
- 2010 - Asquerosamente rich, album of comics of Panini.
- 2011 - Al mejor postor, digital publication of Dolmen/Esdecómic.
- 2011 - TBO4Japan, publication with comics of Dibbuks.
- 2012 - Día del cómic gratis español, fascicle of comics of Zone Comic.
- 2013 - Morirse in Bilbao, fascicle of historietes, nº2.
- Without date - Compa(ñ)ero Leonardo, publication with historietes edited by Semana Black/Pepsi.

== Prizes and success ==
Víctor Santos has won six prizes from Barcelona International Comics Convention, two from Ficomic at Madrid and a prize from Dolmen Editorial's critics as the best cartoonist. As The New York Times states, his works Filthy Rich and Witch & Wizard are bestsellers.

== Sources ==
- PONS, Álvaro, PORCEL, Pedro y SORNÍ, Vicente. Viñetas a la Luna de Valencia. Castalla: Edicions de Ponent, Collection Grey Papers, 2007. Depósito Legal: A-295-2007. ISBN 978-84-96730-04-5.
