= 1859 =

1859 in various calendars
- Gregorian calendar: 1859; MDCCCLIX
- Ab urbe condita: 2612
- Armenian calendar: 1308; ԹՎ ՌՅԸ
- Assyrian calendar: 6609
- Baháʼí calendar: 15–16
- Balinese saka calendar: 1780–1781
- Bengali calendar: 1265–1266
- Berber calendar: 2809
- British Regnal year: 22 Vict. 1 – 23 Vict. 1
- Buddhist calendar: 2403
- Burmese calendar: 1221
- Byzantine calendar: 7367–7368
- Chinese calendar: 戊午年 (Earth Horse); 4556 or 4349 — to — 己未年 (Earth Goat); 4557 or 4350
- Coptic calendar: 1575–1576
- Discordian calendar: 3025
- Ethiopian calendar: 1851–1852
- Hebrew calendar: 5619–5620
- Hindu calendars
- Vikram Samvat: 1915–1916
- Shaka Samvat: 1780–1781
- Kali Yuga: 4959–4960
- Holocene calendar: 11859
- Igbo calendar: 859–860
- Iranian calendar: 1237–1238
- Islamic calendar: 1275–1276
- Japanese calendar: Ansei 6 (安政６年)
- Javanese calendar: 1787–1788
- Julian calendar: Gregorian minus 12 days
- Korean calendar: 4192
- Minguo calendar: 53 before ROC 民前53年
- Nanakshahi calendar: 391
- Thai solar calendar: 2401–2402
- Tibetan calendar: ས་ཕོ་རྟ་ལོ་ (male Earth-Horse); 1985 or 1604 or 832 — to — ས་མོ་ལུག་ལོ་ (female Earth-Sheep); 1986 or 1605 or 833

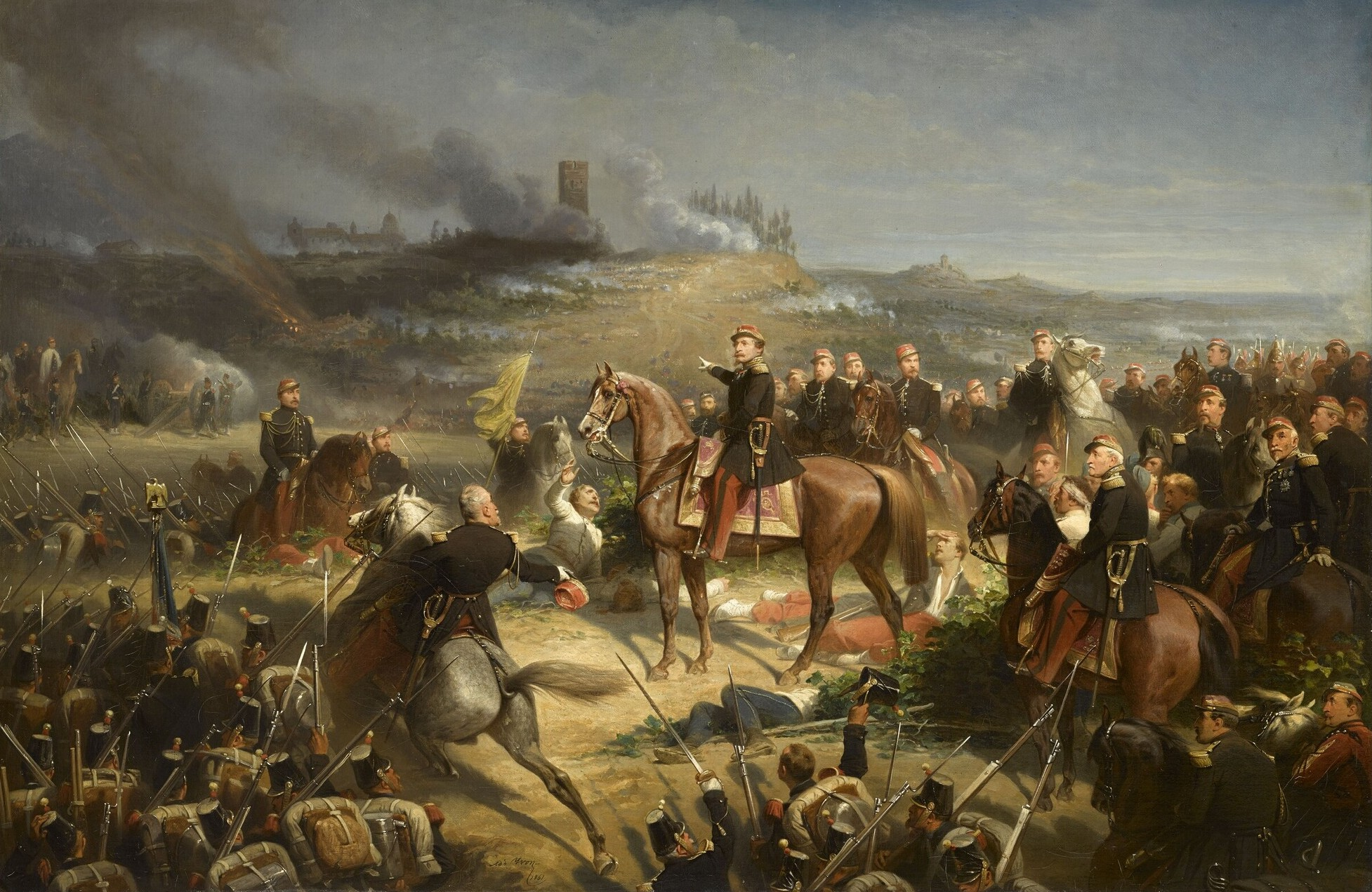
June 24: Napoleon III of France defeats the Austrians at the Battle of Solferino.

1859 (MDCCCLIX) was a common year starting on Saturday of the Gregorian calendar and a common year starting on Thursday of the Julian calendar, the 1859th year of the Common Era (CE) and Anno Domini (AD) designations, the 859th year of the 2nd millennium, the 59th year of the 19th century, and the 10th and last year of the 1850s decade. As of the start of 1859, the Gregorian calendar was 12 days ahead of the Julian calendar, which remained in localized use until 1923.

== Events ==
=== January–March ===
- January 21 – José Mariano Salas (1797–1867) becomes Conservative interim President of Mexico.
- January 24 (O. S.) – Under the rule of Alexandru Ioan Cuza, the provinces of Wallachia and Moldavia are united under the jurisdiction of the Ottoman Empire. It would be a principal step in forming the modern state of Romania.
- January 28 – The city of Olympia is incorporated in the Washington Territory of the United States of America.
- February 2 – Miguel Miramón (1832–1867) becomes Conservative interim President of Mexico.
- February 4 – German scholar Constantin von Tischendorf rediscovers the Codex Sinaiticus, a 4th-century uncial manuscript of the Greek Bible, in Saint Catherine's Monastery on the foot of Mount Sinai, in the Khedivate of Egypt and arranges for its presentation to his patron, Tsar Alexander II of Russia at Saint Petersburg.
- February 14 – Oregon is admitted as the 33rd U.S. state.
- February 12 – The Mekteb-i Mülkiye School is founded in the Ottoman Empire.
- February 17 – French naval forces under Charles Rigault de Genouilly capture the city and Citadel of Saigon in Vietnam, beginning the Siege of Saigon.
- February 27 – United States Congressman Daniel Sickles shoots Philip Barton Key (U.S. District Attorney) for having an affair with his wife.
- March 3 – Construction begins on the first railway in northern India as tracks are laid between the modern-day locations of Allahabad and Kanpur.
- March 9 – The army of the Kingdom of Sardinia mobilizes against Austria, beginning the crisis which will lead to the Austro-Sardinian War.
- March 21 – Pennsylvania issues the charter establishing the Zoological Society of Philadelphia, the first organization of its kind in the United States, and founder of the nation's first zoo.
- March 26 – French amateur astronomer Edmond Modeste Lescarbault claims to have noticed a planet closer to the Sun than Mercury (later named Vulcan).

=== April–June ===
- April 13 – The Cooper Union for the Advancement of Science and Art is founded by Peter Cooper, a New York industrialist, inventor and philanthropist.
- April 18 – Indian Rebellion revolutionary, Tantia Tope is hanged for the 1857 Rebellion
- April 25 – Ground is broken for the Suez Canal, in Egypt.
- April 28 – American ship Pomona is wrecked off the Irish coast, with 424 dead.
- April 29 – Austrian troops begin to cross the Ticino River to Piedmont.
- April 30 – A Tale of Two Cities by Charles Dickens is published in England.
- May 4 – The Cornwall Railway opens across the Royal Albert Bridge, linking the counties of Devon and Cornwall in England.
- May 5 – Border Treaty between Brazil and Venezuela: The two countries agree their borders should be traced at the water divide, between the Amazon and the Orinoco basins.
- May 18 – The 1859 United Kingdom general election concludes. It is the first election fought by the new Liberal Party, in which they win a 28 seat majority, with Liberal leader Viscount Palmerston becoming prime minister.
- May 20 – Austro-Sardinian War: Battle of Montebello – The Austrian army led by Karl von Urban faces the French-Sardinian combined forces.
- May 22 – Ferdinand II of the Two Sicilies is succeeded by his 23-year-old son, Francis II of the Two Sicilies.
- May 26 – Austro-Sardinian War: Battle of Varese – Giuseppe Garibaldi's Hunters of the Alps confront and defeat Austrian forces, led by Field Marshal-Lieutenant Karl von Urban.
- May 26, June 2 – Geologist Joseph Prestwich and amateur archaeologist John Evans report (to the Royal Society and Society of Antiquaries of London, respectively) the results of their investigations of gravel-pits in the Somme valley and elsewhere, extending human history back to what will become known as the Paleolithic Era.
- May 30 – Austro-Sardinian War: Battle of Palestro – The Sardinians defeat the Austrian army.
- May 31 – Big Ben, the Great Clock at the Palace of Westminster, London, is started.
- June 4 – Austro-Sardinian War: Battle of Magenta – The French and Sardinians defeat the Austrians.
- June 6 – The British Crown colony of Queensland in Australia is created, by devolving part of the territory of New South Wales (Queensland Day). Brisbane is declared the capital.
- June 8 – The discovery of the Comstock Lode in the western Utah Territory sets off the Rush to Washoe.
- June 15
  - Austro-Sardinian War: Battle of Treponti – The Austrian Field Marshall Karl von Urban defeats Giuseppe Garibaldi.
  - The so-called Pig War border dispute between the Americans and the British, over the San Juan Islands, begins by the death of the namesake pig.
- June 17 – The only recorded simoom ever in North America hits Goleta and Santa Barbara, California.
- June 18 – Aletschhorn, the second summit of the Bernese Alps, is first ascended.
- June 24 – Austro-Sardinian War – Battle of Solferino: The Kingdom of Sardinia and the armies of Napoleon III of France defeat Franz Joseph I of Austria in northern Italy; the battle inspires Henri Dunant to found the Red Cross.
- June 30 – Charles Blondin crosses Niagara Falls on a tightrope for the first time.

=== July–September ===
- July 1 – The first intercollegiate baseball game is played, between Amherst and Williams Colleges.
- July 8 – Charles XV succeeds his father Oscar I of Sweden and Norway (as Charles IV).
- July 11
  - The chimes of Big Ben ring for the first time in London.
  - Austro-Sardinian War – By the preliminary treaty signed at Villafranca, Italy, Lombardy is ceded to the French (who immediately cede it to Sardinia), while the Austrians keep Venetia, and the French promise to restore the Central Italian rulers expelled in the course of the war. This brings the Austro-Sardinian War effectively to a close.
- July 28 – The Bishop Cotton school (Shimla) (BCS) is founded.
- July 30 – Grand Combin, one of the highest summits in the Alps, is first ascended.
- July
  - Count Camillo Benso di Cavour resigns, as president of Piedmont-Sardinia.
  - Pike's Peak Gold Rush begins in the Colorado Territory.
- August 16 – The Tuscan National Assembly formally deposes the House of Habsburg-Lorraine, ending an ascendancy of 109 years.
- August 27 – Edwin Drake drills the first oil well in the United States, near Titusville, Pennsylvania, starting the Pennsylvania oil rush.
- August 28–September 2 – The solar storm of 1859, the largest geomagnetic solar storm on record, causes the Northern lights to be visible as far south as Montería, Colombia and knocks out telegraph communication (this is also called the Carrington event).
- September 17 – In San Francisco, Joshua Norton proclaims himself to be His Imperial Majesty Emperor Norton I, Emperor of the United States and Protector of Mexico.
- September – British merchant Thomas Blake Glover begins business in Nagasaki, Japan.

=== October–December ===
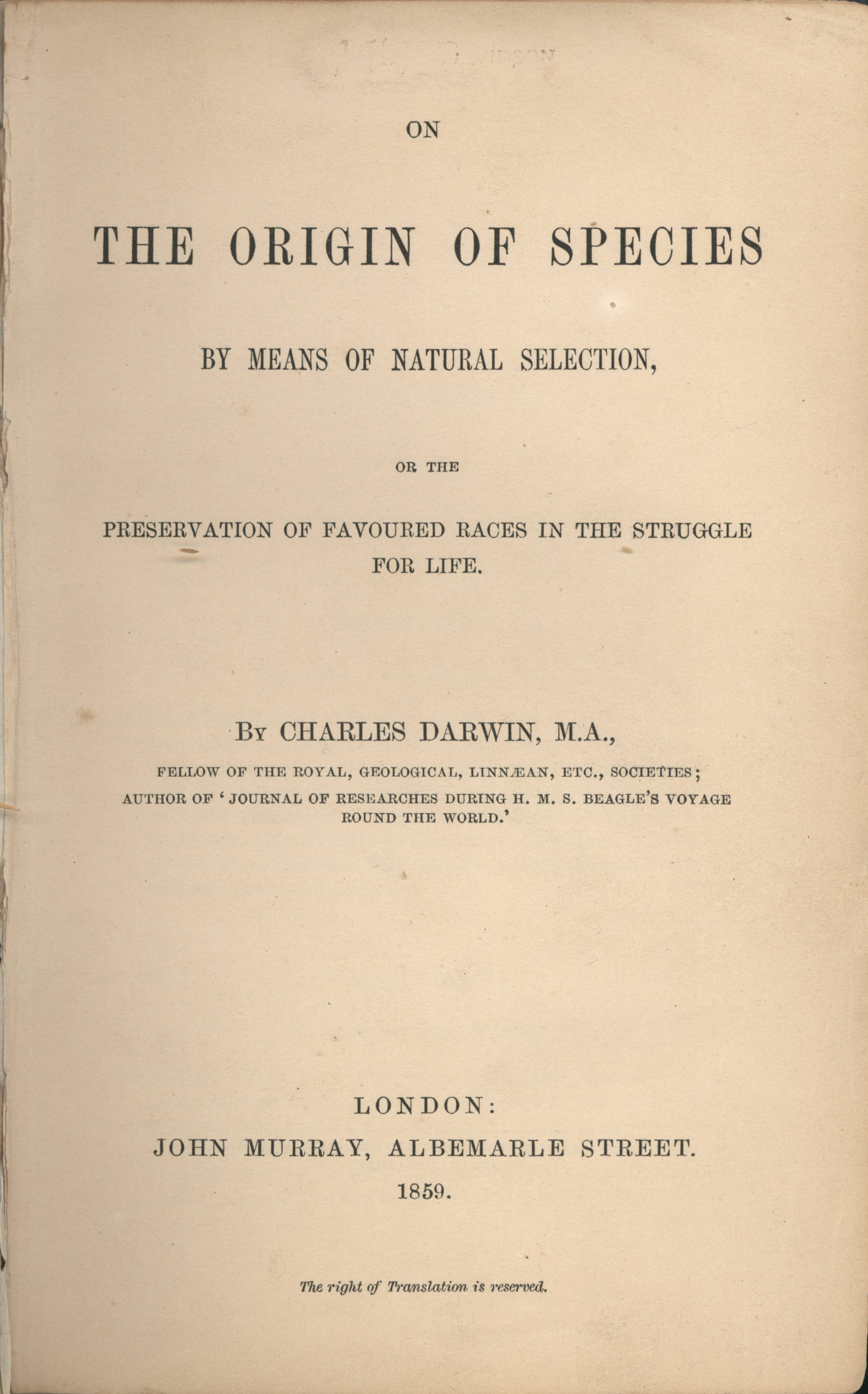

- October 16 – John Brown raids the Harpers Ferry Armory in Harper's Ferry, Virginia, in an unsuccessful bid to spark a general slave rebellion.
- October 18 – Troops under Colonel Robert E. Lee overpower John Brown at the Federal arsenal.
- October 26 – The steamship Royal Charter is wrecked on the coast of Anglesey, Wales, with 454 dead.
- November 1 – The current Cape Lookout, North Carolina, lighthouse is lighted for the first time (its first-order Fresnel lens can be seen for 19 miles).
- November 10 – The Treaty of Zürich, reaffirming the terms of the Treaty of Villafranca, brings the Austro-Sardinian War to an official close.
- November 15 – The first Zappas Olympics open in Greece.
- November 24
  - English naturalist Charles Darwin publishes On the Origin of Species, a book which argues for the gradual evolution of species through natural selection (it immediately sells out its initial print run).
  - The French Navy's La Gloire, the first ocean-going ironclad warship in history, is launched.
- November – Bernhard Riemann publishes On the Number of Primes Less Than a Given Magnitude. In his paper there is an incidental comment that later becomes the Riemann hypothesis, one of the most important unsolved problems in Mathematics.
- December 2 – Militant abolitionist leader John Brown is hanged for his October 16 raid on Harpers Ferry, West Virginia.
- December 10 – The Ateneo de Manila University is founded, as the Escuela Municipal de Manila.

=== Date unknown ===
- District nursing begins in Liverpool, England, when philanthropist William Rathbone employs Mary Robinson to nurse the sick poor in their own homes.
- The island of Timor is divided between Portugal and the Netherlands.
- The Rancho Rincon de Los Esteros Land Grant is confirmed to Rafael Alvisa (part of modern-day Santa Clara County, California).
- The University of Michigan Law School is founded.
- Karl Marx publishes A Contribution to the Critique of Political Economy.
- John Stuart Mill publishes On Liberty.
- George Eliot publishes Adam Bede.
- Alfred, Lord Tennyson publishes the first set of Idylls of the King.
- The Society for Promoting the Employment of Women is founded.
- The Mary Institute is founded in Missouri.
- Tidskrift för hemmet, the first women's magazine in the Nordic countries, begins publication in Sweden.
- Nillmij, a predecessor of Aegon, Dutch-based worldwide insurance company, is founded in the Dutch East Indies (modern Indonesia).

== Births ==
=== January–March ===
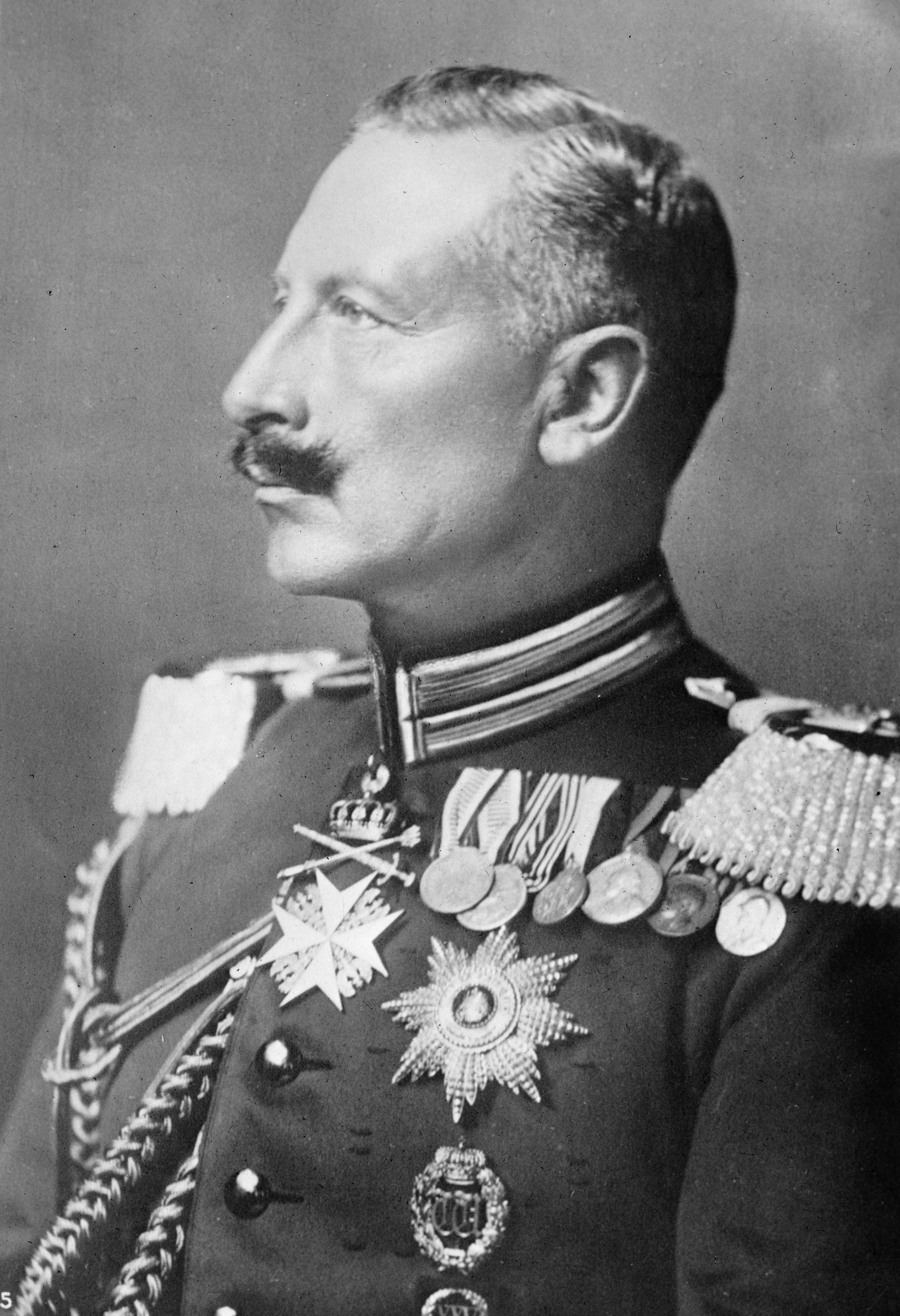
Wilhelm II, German Emperor

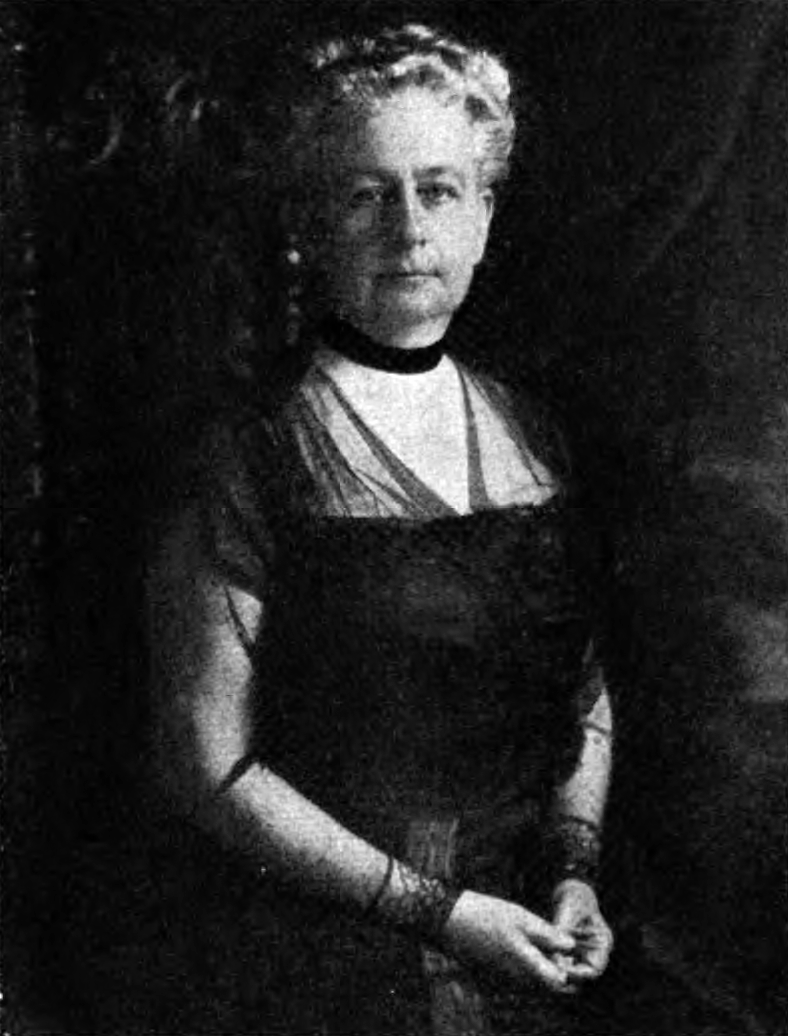
Louise DeKoven Bowen

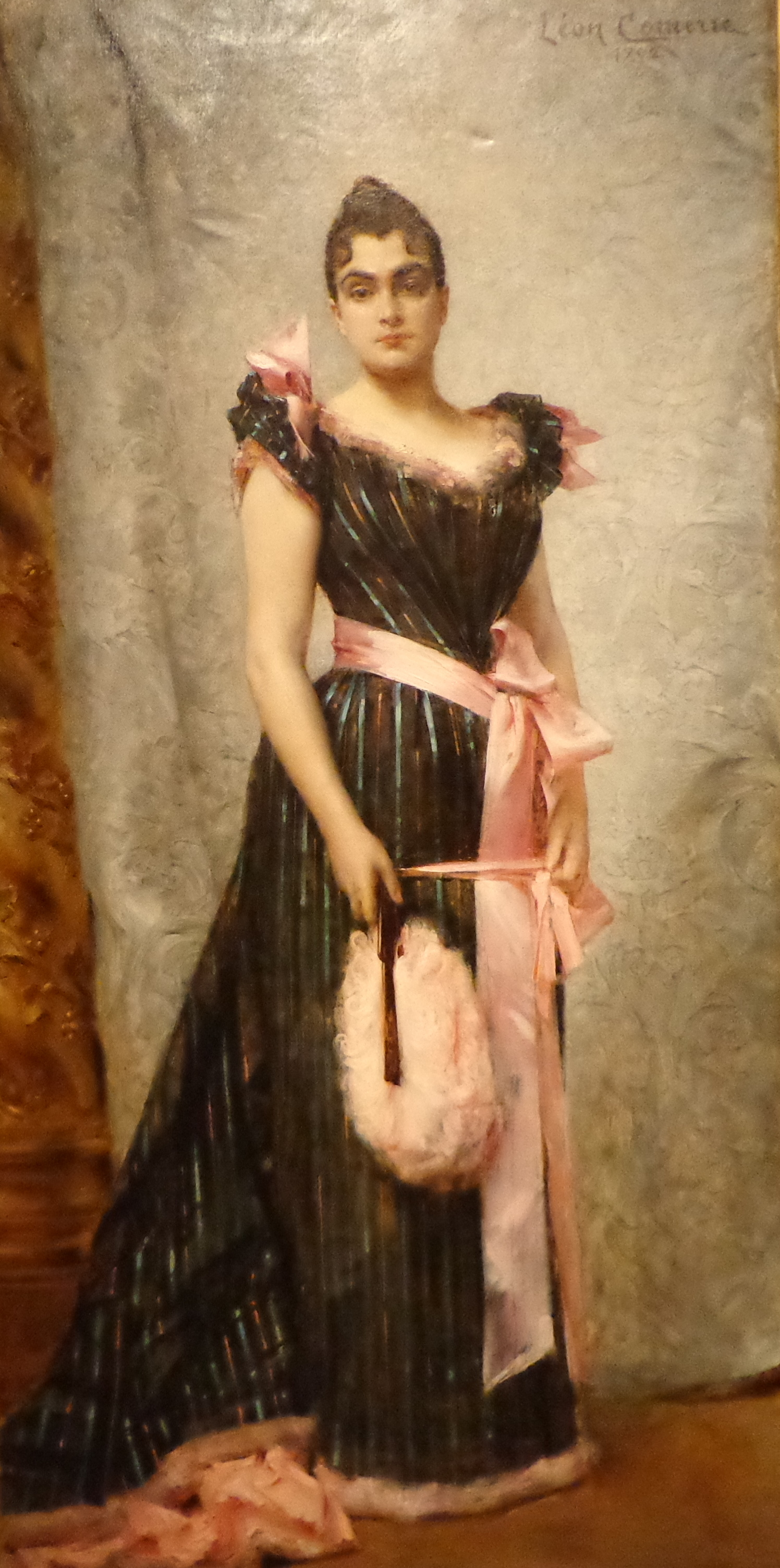
Jacqueline Comerre-Paton

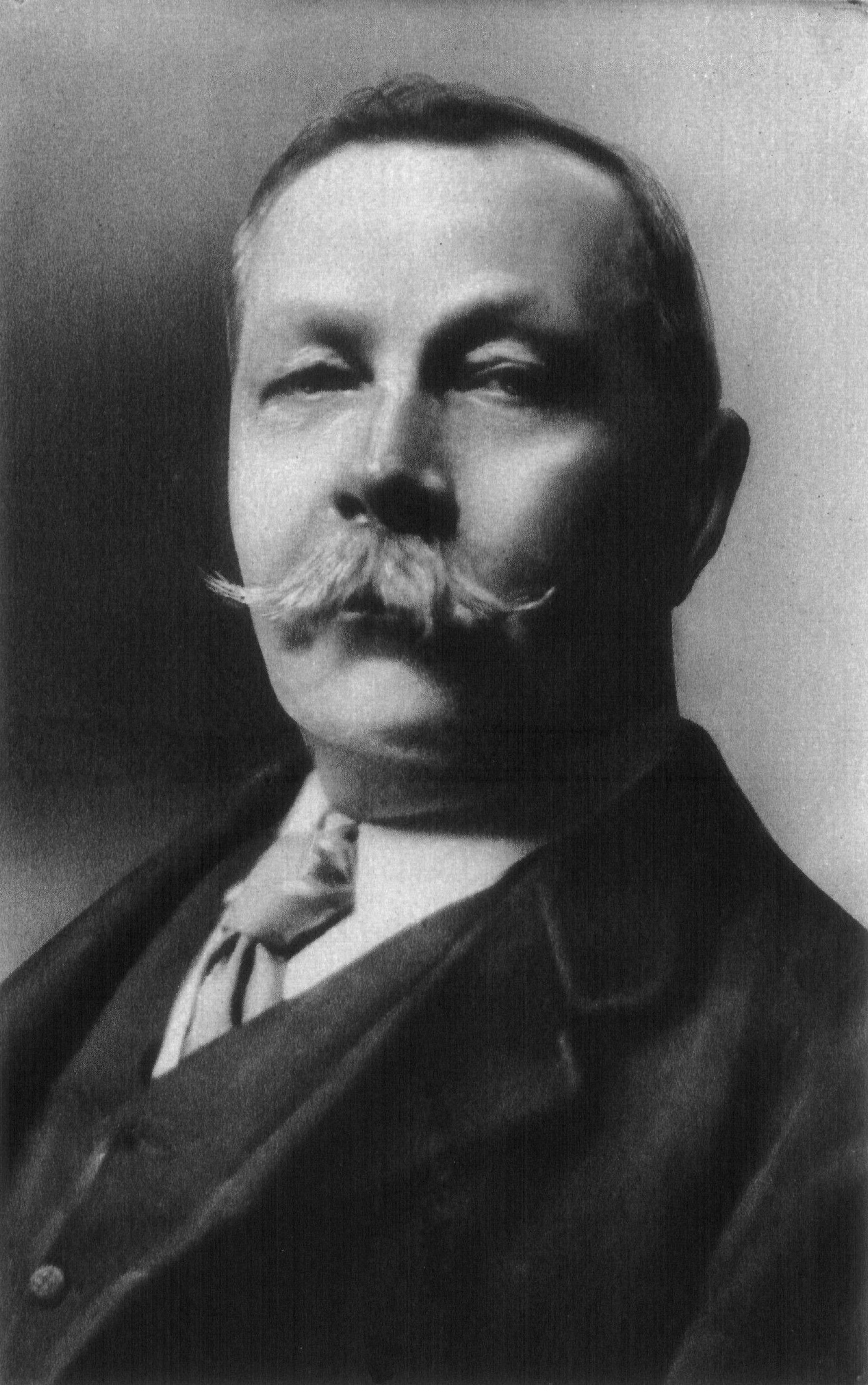
Arthur Conan Doyle

- January 6 – Hugh Rodman, American admiral (d. 1940)
- January 8 – Fanny Bullock Workman, American geographer, writer and mountain climber (d. 1925)
- January 11 – George Curzon, 1st Marquess Curzon of Kedleston, British statesman, Viceroy of India (d. 1925)
- January 27
  - James Grierson, British general (d. 1914)
  - Wilhelm II, last Emperor of Germany and King of Prussia (d. 1941)
- January 29 – Virginie Amélie Avegno Gautreau, American-born Parisian socialite, model for the painting Portrait of Madame X (d. 1915)
- February 1
  - Henry Miller, English-born American stage actor, producer (d. 1926)
  - Victor Herbert, Irish-born composer (Babes In Toyland) (d. 1924)
- February 3 – Hugo Junkers, German industrialist, aircraft designer (d. 1935)
- February 4 – Gus Leonard, American-born movie actor (d. 1939)
- February 5
  - Louis Cheikho, Lebanese Jesuit Chaldean priest and venerable (d. 1927)
  - Ernest Terah Hooley, English fraudster (d. 1947)
- February 9 – Akiyama Yoshifuru, Japanese general (d. 1930)
- February 10 – Alexandre Millerand, President of France (d. 1943)
- February 14
  - Henry Valentine Knaggs, English physician, author (d. 1954)
  - George Washington Gale Ferris Jr., American inventor of the Ferris wheel (d. 1896)
- February 19 – Svante Arrhenius, Swedish chemist, Nobel Prize laureate (d. 1927)
- February 24 – George Edwin Patey, British admiral (d. 1935)
- February 25 – Vasil Kutinchev, Bulgarian general (d. 1941)
- February 26 – Louise DeKoven Bowen, American philanthropist, activist (d. 1953)
- February 28 – Florian Cajori, Swiss historian of mathematics (d. 1930)
- March 2 – Sholem Aleichem, Ukrainian Yiddish novelist (d. 1916)
- March 8 – Kenneth Grahame, English author (d. 1932)
- March 9 – Alexandru Averescu, Romanian general and politician, 24th Prime Minister of Romania (d. 1938)
- March 12 – Abraham H. Cannon, American Mormon apostle (d. 1896)
- March 13 – Alice Bellvadore Sams Turner, American physician (d. 1915)
- March 16 [O.S. March 4] – Alexander Stepanovich Popov, Russian physicist (d. 1906 [O.S. 1905])
- March 25 – Hendrik Wortman, Dutch civil engineer (d. 1939)
- March 26 – A. E. Housman, English poet (d. 1936)

=== April–June ===
- April 3 – Reginald De Koven, American composer, music critic (d. 1920)
- April 7 – Jacques Loeb, German–American physiologist, biologist (d. 1924)
- April 8 – Edmund Husserl, Austrian philosopher (d. 1938)
- April 14 – Luigi Capello, Italian general (d. 1941)
- April 17 – Willis Van Devanter, Associate Justice of the Supreme Court of the United States (d. 1941)
- May 1 – Jacqueline Comerre-Paton, French artist (d. 1955)
- May 15 – Pierre Curie, French physicist, Nobel Prize laureate (d. 1906)
- May 22 – Sir Arthur Conan Doyle, Scottish writer (d. 1930)
- June 5 – Belle Archer, American actress (d. 1900)
- June 9 – Doveton Sturdee, British admiral (d. 1925)
- June 21 – Henry Ossawa Tanner, American artist (d. 1937)

=== July–September ===
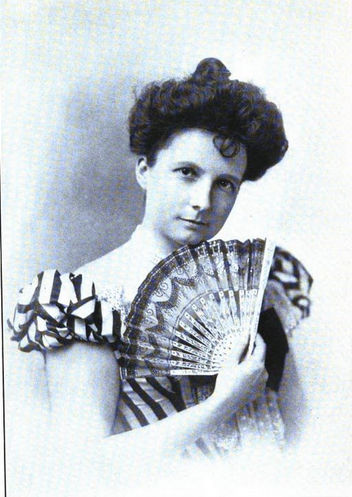
Dora Knowlton Ranous

- July 1 – DeLancey W. Gill, American artist (d. 1940)
- July 6
  - Alexander Hamilton-Gordon, British general (d. 1939)
  - Verner von Heidenstam, Swedish writer, Nobel Prize laureate (d. 1940)
- July 13 – Sidney Webb, 1st Baron Passfield, British co-founder of the London School of Economics (d. 1947)
- July 25 – Albert Parker Niblack, American admiral (d. 1929)
- July 28 – Mary Anderson, American stage actress (d. 1940)
- July 29 – Francisco Rodrigues da Cruz, Portuguese priest (d. 1948)
- August 2 – Auguste Adib Pacha, 2-time prime minister of Lebanon (d. 1936)
- August 4 – Knut Hamsun, Norwegian author, Nobel Prize laureate (d. 1952)
- August 16 – Dora Knowlton Ranous, American actress, author and translator (d. 1916)
- August 18 – Anna Ancher, Danish painter (d. 1935)
- September 3 – Jean Jaurès, French socialist (d. 1914)
- September 6 – Frank H. Spearman, American writer (d. 1937)
- September 7 – Margaret Crosfield, British palaeontologist, geologist (d. 1952)
- September 16 – Yuan Shikai, Chinese dictator (d. 1916)
- September 17
  - William H. Bonney (Billy The Kid), American outlaw, gunfighter (d. 1881)
  - I. L. Patterson, American politician, 18th Governor of Oregon (d. 1929)
- September 18 – Lincoln Loy McCandless, Hawaiian politician, rancher (d. 1940)
- September 19 – Marshall Pinckney Wilder, American actor, humorist, comedian and monologist (d. 1915)
- September 21 – Francesc Macià, Catalan politician (d. 1933)
- September 24 – Radko Dimitriev, Bulgarian and Russian general (d. 1918)
- September 28 – Alfredo Baquerizo, 19th President of Ecuador (d. 1951)

=== October–December ===
- October 6 – Frank Seiberling, American inventor, co-founder of Goodyear Tire & Rubber Company (d. 1955)
- October 9 – Alfred Dreyfus, French military officer, subject of the Dreyfus affair (d. 1935)
- October 12 – Diana Abgar, Armenian diplomat (d. 1937)
- October 15 - Augusta Déjerine-Klumpke, American-born French medical doctor specialising in neuroanatomy, first female medical intern to work in a hospital in Paris (d. 1927)
- October 18 – Henri Bergson, French philosopher, recipient of the Nobel Prize in Literature (d. 1941)
- October 20 – John Dewey, American philosopher, psychologist and educator (d. 1952)
- November 10 – Gustav Globočnik Edler von Vojka, Austro-Hungarian nobleman and field marshal (d. 1946)
- November 11 – Belle Gunness, born Brynhild Paulsdatter Størseth, Norwegian-born serial killer (d. 1908?)
- November 14 – Alexander Samsonov, Russian general (d. 1914)
- November 15
  - Jean César Graziani, French general (d. 1932)
  - Christopher Hornsrud, 11th prime minister of Norway (d. 1960)
- November 19 – Mikhail Ippolitov-Ivanov, Russian composer (d. 1935)
- November 24 – Cass Gilbert, American architect (Woolworth Building, United States Supreme Court building) (d. 1934)
- November 27 – William Bliss Baker, American painter (d. 1886)
- November 29 – Jesse Pomeroy, youngest convicted murderer in Massachusetts (d. 1932)
- December 2 – Georges Seurat, French painter (d. 1891)
- December 5 – John Jellicoe, 1st Earl Jellicoe, British admiral (d. 1935)
- December 15 – L. L. Zamenhof, Polish creator of Esperanto (d. 1917)
- December 17 – Paul César Helleu, French artist (d. 1927)
- December 17 – Wilmer W. MacElree, American lawyer and author (d. 1960)
- December 24 – Olive E. Dana, American author (d. 1904)
- December 29 – Venustiano Carranza, 37th President of Mexico (d. 1920)

=== Date unknown ===
- Vittorio Alinari, Italian photographer (d. 1932)
- Stanisław Roman Lewandowski, Polish sculptor (d. 1940)
- Margaret Manton Merrill, English-American journalist and writer (d. 1893)

== Deaths ==
=== January–June ===
- January 19 – George Schonswar, British politician (b. 1775)
- January 21 – Henry Hallam, English historian (b. 1777)
- January 28 – F. J. Robinson, 1st Viscount Goderich, Prime Minister of the United Kingdom (b. 1782)
- February 13 – Eliza Acton, English poet, cookery writer (b. 1799)
- February 27 – Philip Barton Key, U.S. District Attorney (b. 1818)
- April 8 – Sir Joseph Thackwell, British army general (b. 1781)
- April 16 – Alexis de Tocqueville, French historian (b. 1805)
- May 6 – Alexander von Humboldt, German naturalist and geographer (b. 1769)
- May 13 – Bakht Khan, commander-in-chief of Indian rebel forces in the Indian Rebellion of 1857 (b. 1797)
- June 11 – Klemens Wenzel von Metternich, Austrian diplomat (b. 1773)
- June 13 – Angélique Brûlon, French soldier, first female Knight of the French Legion of Honour (b. 1772)
- June 23 – Maria Pavlovna, Dowager Grand Duchess of Saxe-Weimar-Eisenach (b. 1786)
- June 27 – Jean Chrétien Baud, Governor-General of the Dutch East Indies (b. 1789)

=== July–December ===
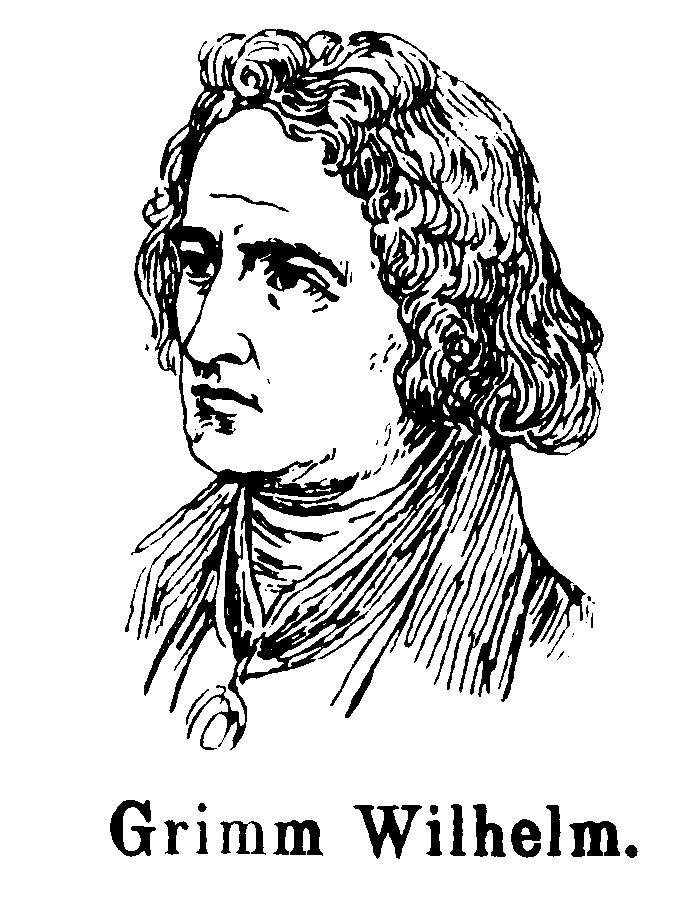
Wilhelm Grimm

- July 8
  - King Oscar I of Sweden and Norway (b. 1799)
  - Charlotte von Siebold, German gynecologist (b. 1788)
- July 16 – Charles Cathcart, 2nd Earl Cathcart, British army general and colonial administrator (b. 1783)
- July 17 – Stephanie of Hohenzollern-Sigmaringen, Queen consort of Portugal (b. 1837)
- July 30 – Richard Rush, United States Attorney General under James Madison, United States Secretary of the Treasury under President John Quincy Adams (b. 1780)
- August 2 – Horace Mann, American educator, abolitionist (b. 1796)
- August 4 – John Vianney, French saint known as the Curé de Ars (b. 1786)
- August 15 – Nathaniel Claiborne, U.S. politician (b. 1777)
- August 28
  - Leigh Hunt, British critic, essayist (b. 1784)
  - Sultan Abd al-Rahman of Morocco (b. 1788)
- September 15 – Isambard Kingdom Brunel, British engineer (b. 1806)
- September 19 – George Bush (biblical scholar), American professor of Asian languages (b. 1796)
- September 28 – Carl Ritter, German geographer (b. 1779)
- October 4 – Karl Baedeker, German author, publisher (b. 1801)
- October 12 – Robert Stephenson, English civil engineer (b. 1803)
- October 22 – Louis Spohr, German violinist, composer (b. 1784)
- November 28 – Washington Irving, American author (b. 1783)
- December 2 – John Brown, American abolitionist (hanged) (b. 1800)
- December 8 – Thomas de Quincey, English writer (b. 1785)
- December 16 – Wilhelm Grimm, German philologist, folklorist (b. 1786)
