= Universal Hungarian encyclopaedia =

Climate Change in our Earth

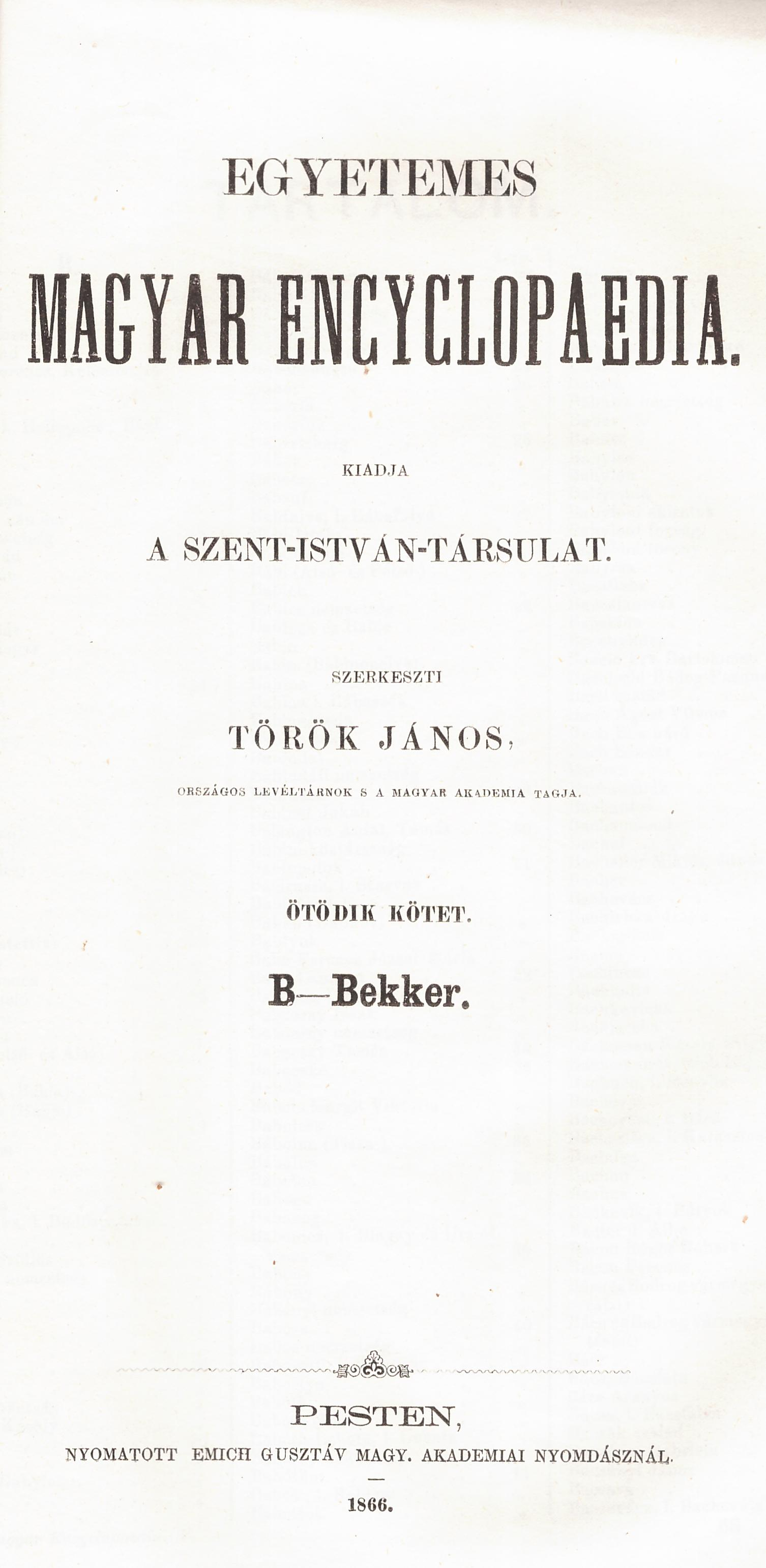

The Universal Hungarian Encyclopaedia (Hungarian "Egyetemes magyar encyclopaedia") is a 13-volume Hungarian lexicon published in the second half of the 19th century.

== History ==
The lexicon, made in 13 large-format (20x27 cm) volumes, was published between 1859 and 1876 in Pest (and then in Budapest after the unification) under the care of the Szent István Society. The editors of the work were János Török (1807–1874), János Pollák (1824–1884), Ferenc Laubhaimer (1833–1888). The interesting thing about the series is that it appeared not with a page, but with column numbering (the text mirror has 2 columns on 1 page), so the page number is equal to half of the column numbers. It is close to 9,300 columns, or about 4,600 to 4,700 pages.

The lexicon does not have a reprint edition, and can be viewed electronically by registration with a subscription on the Arcanum website; or without registration in the - XIII. with the exception of Volume - on the website of the Münchener Digitalisierungs Zentrum Digitale Bibliothek (see individual volumes in the list below).

== Volume Function ==
| Volume Number | Volume title | Year of publication | Number of columns | Electronic access |
|---|---|---|---|---|
| Volume I | A–Ajuga | 1859 | 1059 | |
| Volume II | Aka–Amerika | 1860 | 1130 | |
| Volume III | Amerikai alkotmányok–Asa | 1861 | 1103 | |
| Volume IV | Asaba–Azzolino, Á–Ázsiai társaságok | 1862 | 1086 | |
| Volume V | B–Bekker | 1866 | 528 | V./a és V./b |
| Volume VI | Bél–Cockerill | 1868 | 800 | |
| Volume VII | Codrington–Ercylla y Zuniga | 1869 | 799 | |
| Volume VIII | Érczhegység–Görög nyelv | 1870 | 798 | |
| Volume IX | Görögország története–Joachim | 1871 | 456 | |
| Volume X | Joakáz–Lysias | 1872 | 358 | |
| Volume XI | Maár–Ozon | 1873 | 414 | |
| Volume XII | Pachydermák–Smyrna | 1874 | 334 | |
| Volume XIII | Só–Zwingli | 1876 | 430 | – |

== Sources ==
- Egyetemes Magyar Encyclopaedia 1859-1876 | Arcanum Digitális Tudománytár
- https://opac.pim.hu/record/-/record/PIM1025234
- Egyetemes Magyar Encyklopaedia â Magyar Katolikus Lexikon
