= Globočnik =

Globočnik is a Slovenian surname. Notable people with the surname include:

- Bojan Globočnik (1962–2021), Slovenian ski jumper
- Gustav Globočnik Edler von Vojka (1859–1946), Austrian soldier and nobleman
- Odilo Globocnik (1904–1945), Austrian Nazi and later an SS leader of Slovenian descent
- Tomaž Globočnik, Slovenian biathlete
