= Edgardo Saporetti =

Italian painter (1865–1909)

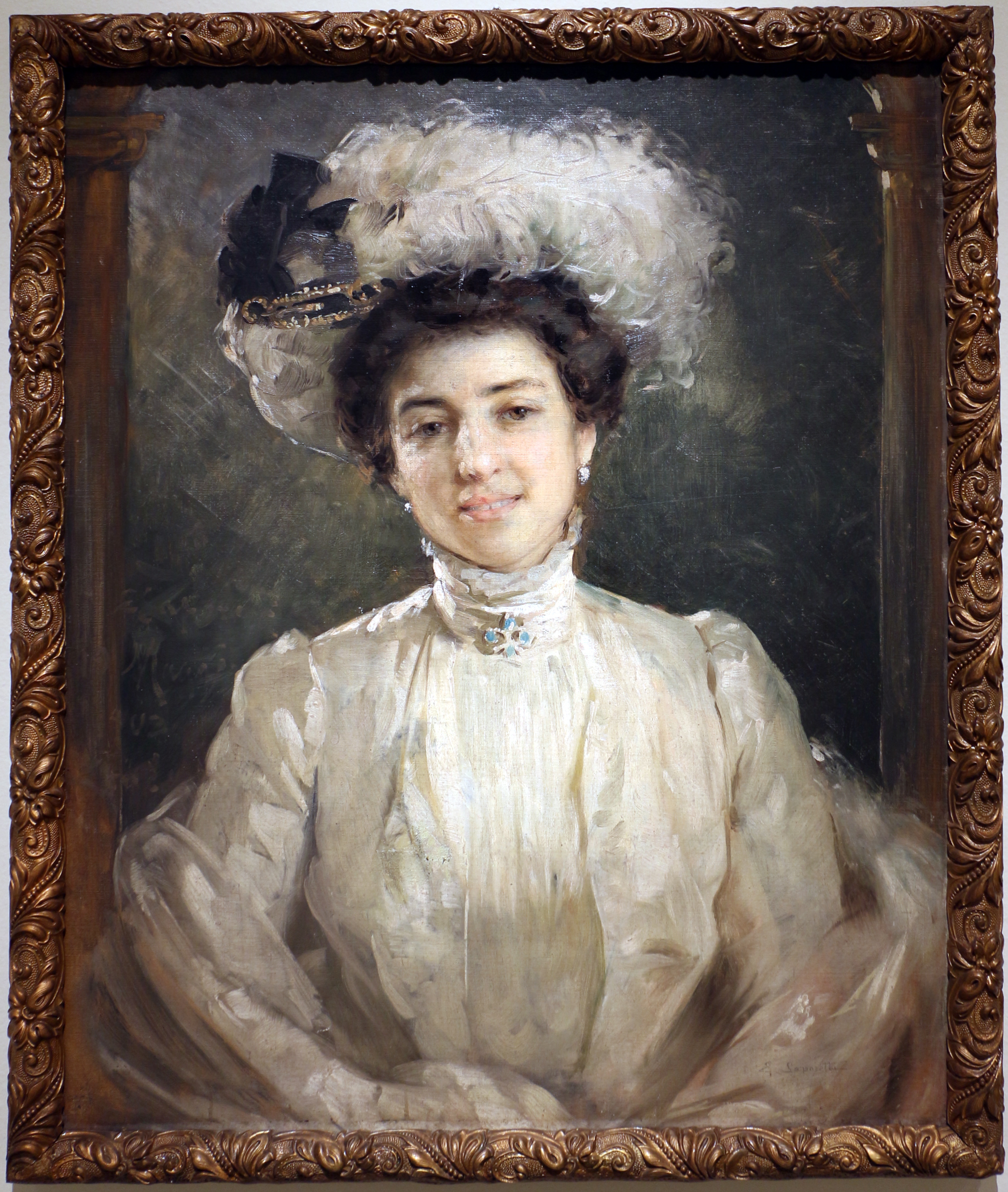
Portrait by Edgardo Saporetti

Edgardo Saporetti (Bagnacavallo, 1865 – Bellaria, 1909) was an Italian painter of eclectic subjects, including portraits, landscapes, and genre subjects.

He was the son of Pietro Saporetti, painter and docent of the Academy of Fine Arts of Ravenna, and initially studied there. At the age of 15 years, he traveled to Rome to work under Cesare Mariani, director of the Accademia di San Luca, then moved to Naples where he worked in the studio of Domenico Morelli. He was commissioned to complete portraits of the King Umberto I, his wife, and son Victor Emmanuel III.

At the 1883 Roman Expositions of Fine Arts, he exhibited several oil paintings: Oh! che gambe!; Occhio alla mamma; Professore in erba; Capannette di Ravenna; and Palude Ravennate. In the next year at the Exhibition of Fine Arts in Turin he exhibited three paintings including Palude Ravennate, Da Villa Borghese, and a third titled A Beggar. He sent to the 1888 Exhibition in Bologna, a portrait of a woman in costume and a Self-portrait (Se ipsum); also a study of a head in costume and two paintings: In the studio and In villa. In the same year he exhibits at the Exhibition of Florence: In Autumn and The Good Enterprise.

His life and career is described as restless and stormy, and financial and other complications, forced him to exile himself to London in 1900. He was to return to Florence in 1903, where he obtained an appointment as adjunct professor of painting at the Academy of Fine Arts, Florence. Among his works there was a series of illustrations of the Divine Comedy for the publisher and photographer Vittorio Alinari. He also completed a Via Crucis in Florence.

In 2010, there was an exhibit at the Museo Civico delle Cappuccine at Bagnacavallo, curated by Diego Galizzi, titled Edgardo Saporetti. Sguardo sul tramonto dell'Ottocento.
