= Dreieckhorn =

Mountain in Switzerland

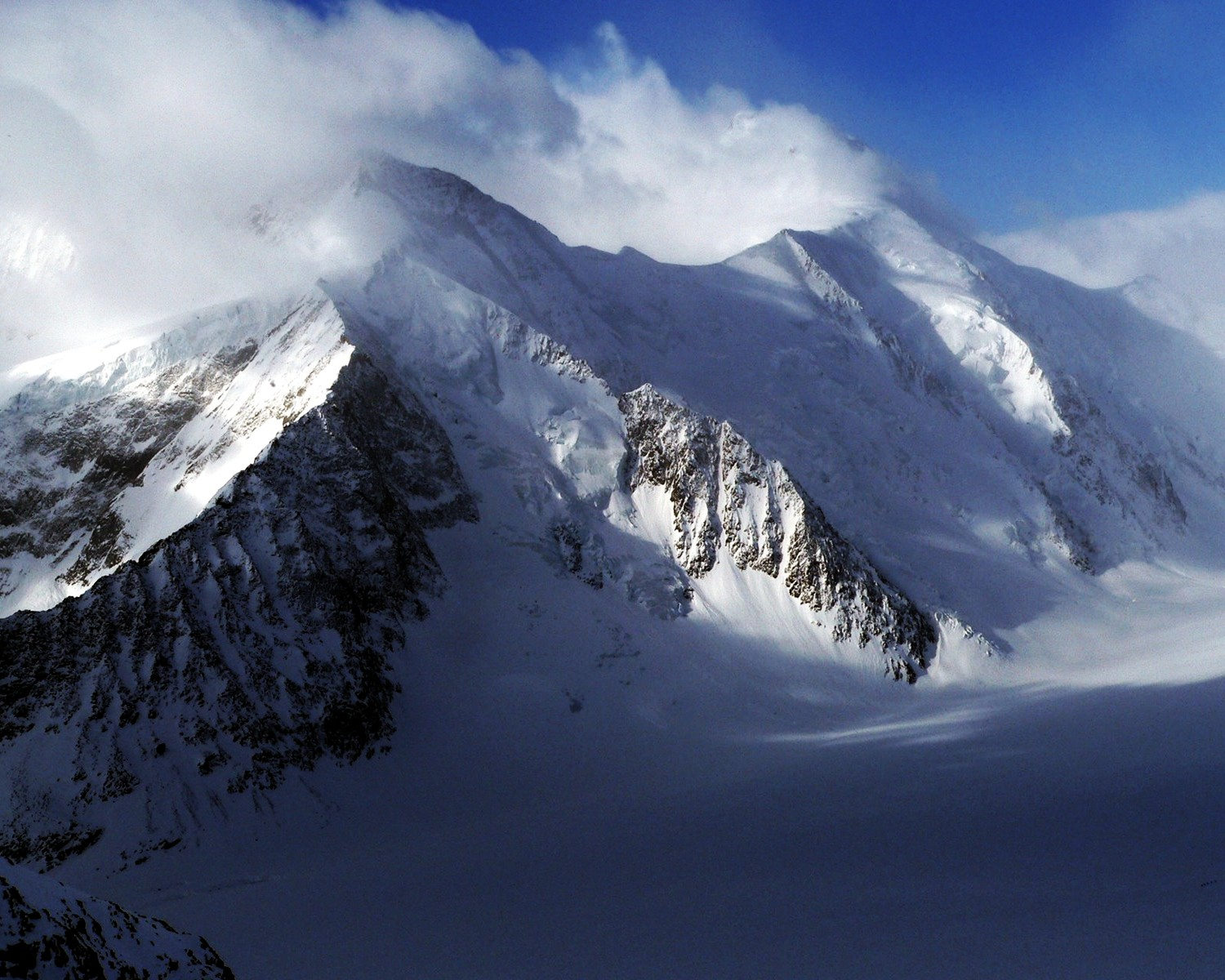
- Dreieckhorn (left) and Aletschhorn (right), from the Aletsch Glacier

Highest point
- Elevation: 3,811 m (12,503 ft)
- Prominence: 192 m (630 ft)
- Parent peak: Aletschhorn
- Coordinates: 46°28′40.8″N 8°1′11.9″E

Geography
- Location within Switzerland
- Location: Valais, Switzerland
- Parent range: Bernese Alps

The Dreieckhorn is a mountain of the Bernese Alps, overlooking Konkordiaplatz in the canton of Valais. In the southeast-ridge of the Dreieckhorn, which is leading to the Olmenhorn, is located the subpeak Kleines Dreieckhorn (3639 m).
