= Brestanica railway station =

Railway station in Brestanica, Slovenia

Brestanica
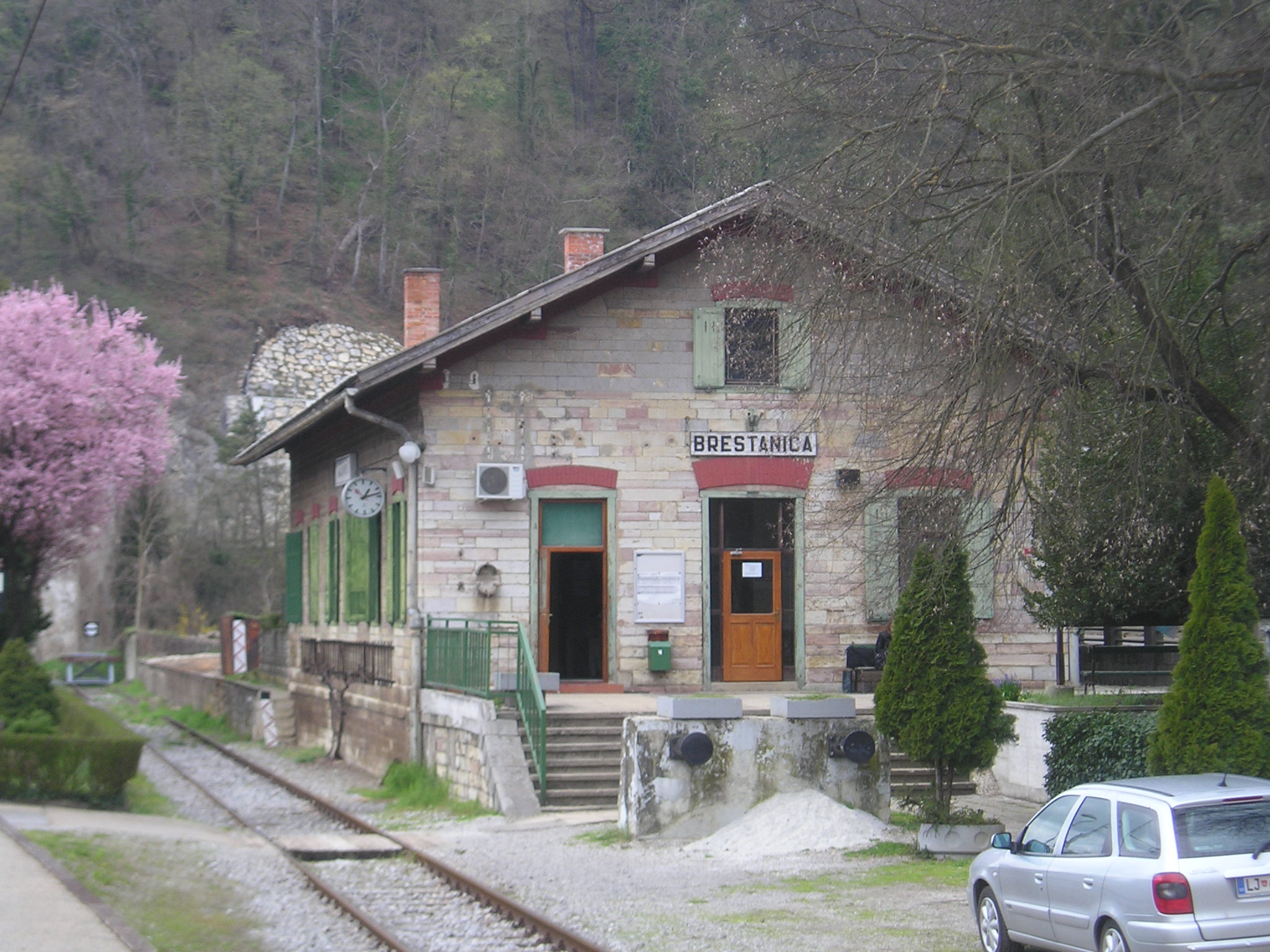

General information
- Location: 8280 Brestanica; Slovenia
- Coordinates: 45°59′16″N 15°28′10″E
- Owner: Slovenian Railways
- Operator: Slovenian Railways
Location
- Location within Slovenia

Brestanica railway station (Slovene: Železniška postaja Brestanica) is the principal railway station in Brestanica, Slovenia.
