= Mittelaletsch Glacier =

Glacier in Switzerland

- Mittelaletschgletscher
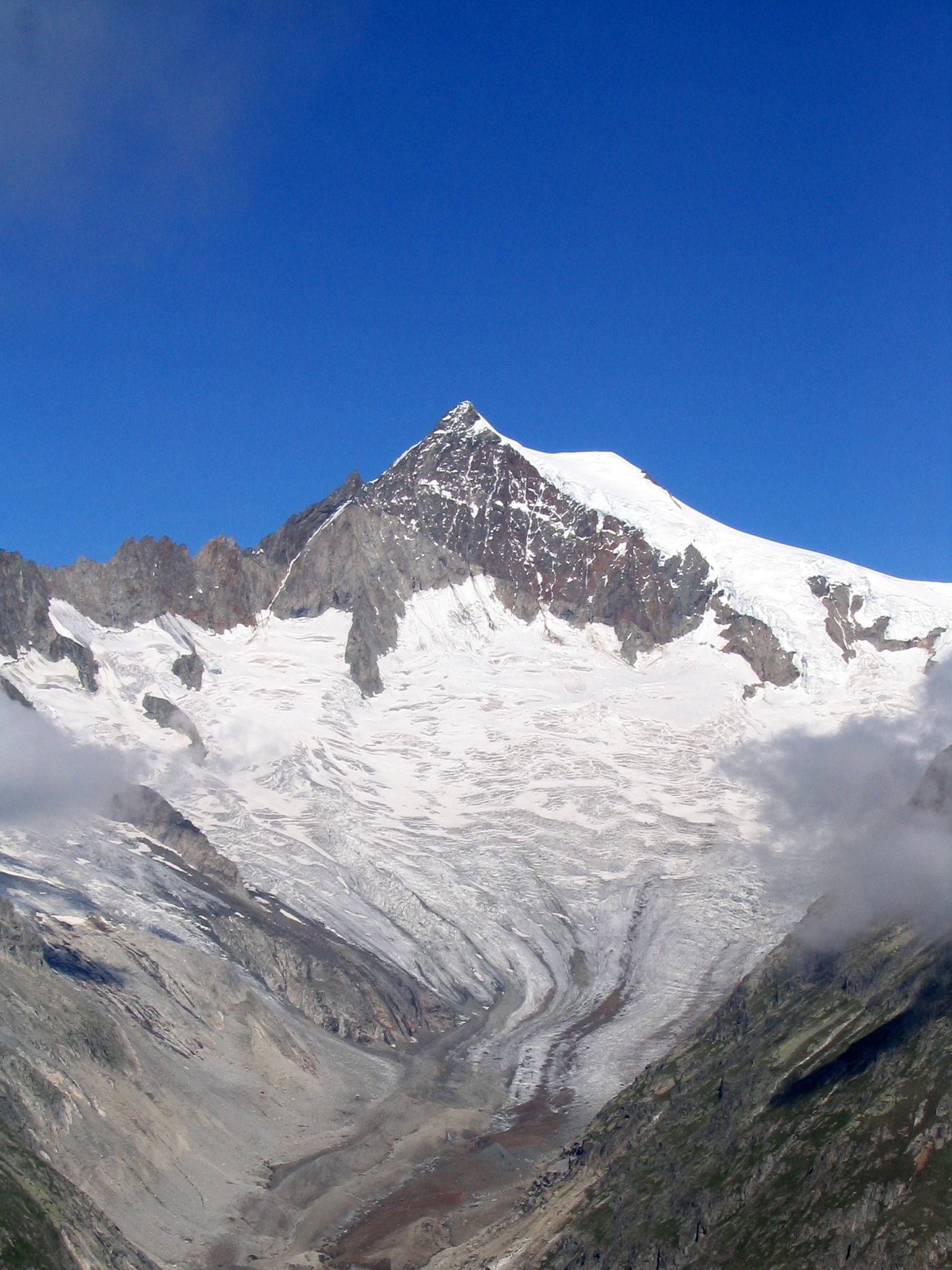
- Mittelaletschgletscher and Aletschhorn
- Interactive map of Mittelaletsch Glacier
- Location: Valais, Switzerland
- Coordinates: 46°27′24″N 8°1′19″E
- Length: 5 km

The Mittelaletsch Glacier (German: Mittelaletschgletscher) is a 5 km long glacier (2005) situated in the Bernese Alps in the canton of Valais in Switzerland. In 1973 it had an area of 8.31 km^{2}.

== See also ==
- List of glaciers in Switzerland
- Swiss Alps
