= Léon Comerre =

French painter (1850–1916)

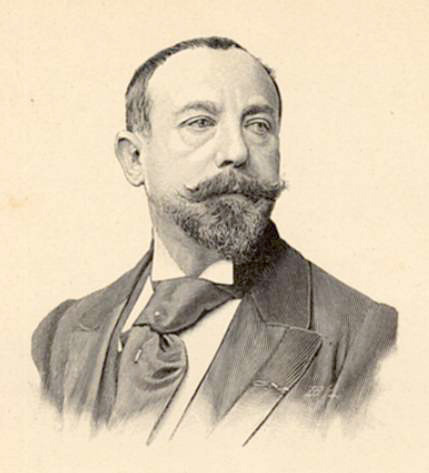
- Born: Léon François Comerre; 10 October 1850; Trélon, France
- Died: 20 February 1916 (aged 65); Vésinet, France
- Education: École des Beaux-Arts in Lille
- Movement: Orientalist

Léon François Comerre (10 October 1850 – 20 February 1916) was a French academic painter, famous for his portraits of beautiful women and Oriental themes.

== Life ==
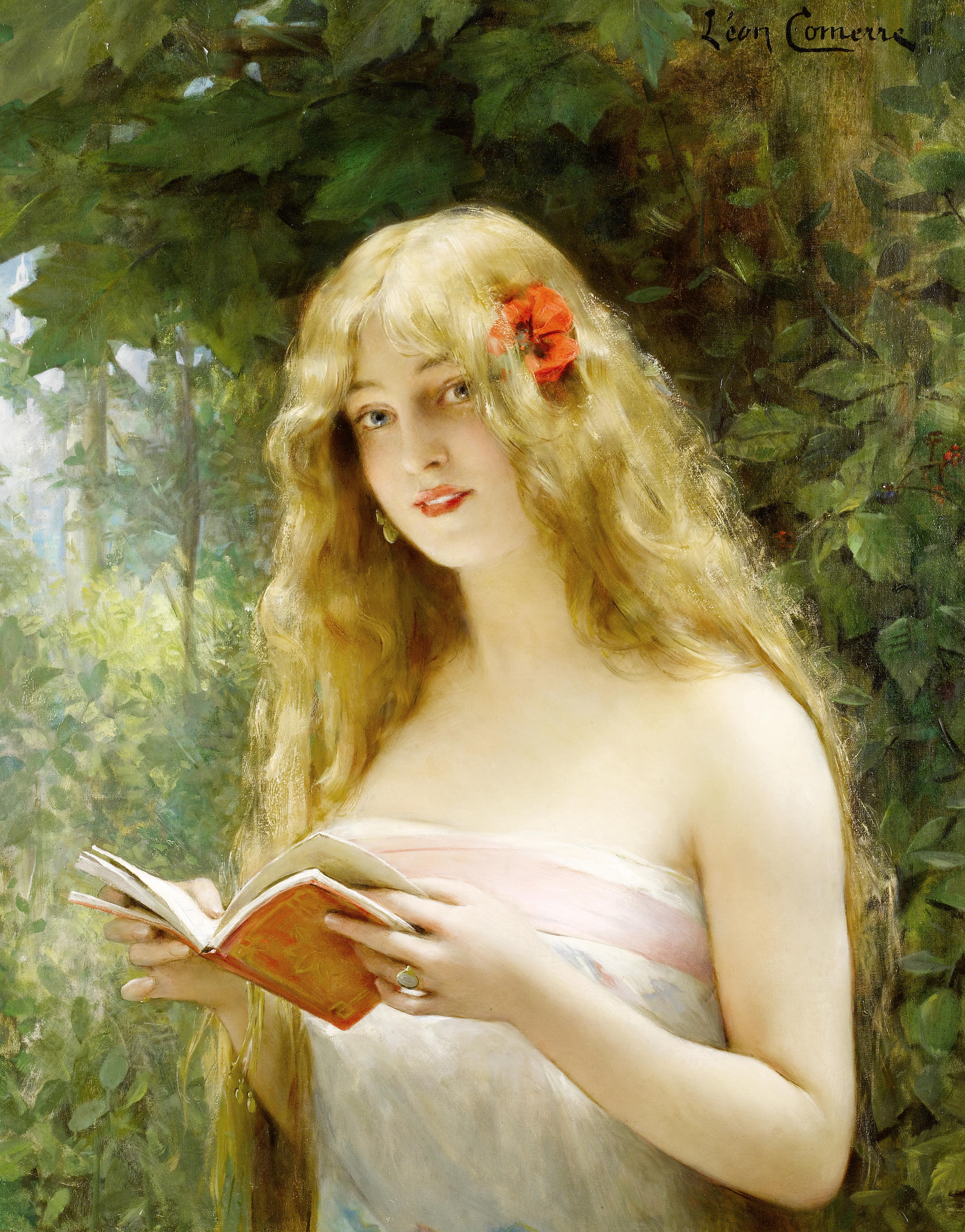
The Beautiful Reader

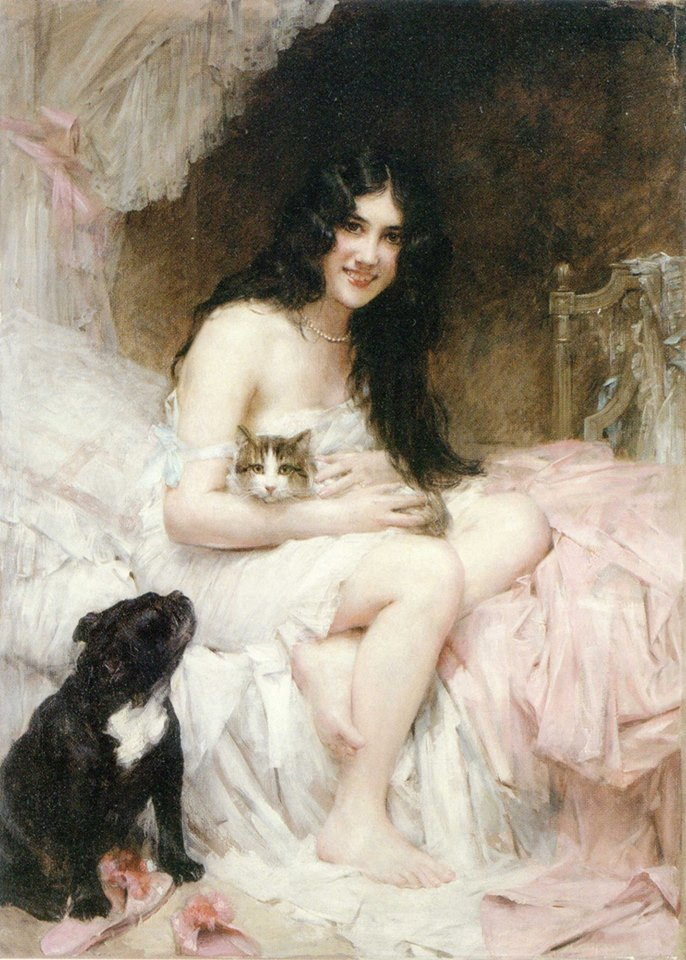
Calinerie

Comerre was born in Trélon, in the Département du Nord, the son of a schoolteacher. He moved to Lille with his family in 1853. From an early age he showed an interest in art and became a student of Alphonse Colas at the École des Beaux-Arts in Lille, winning a gold medal in 1867. From 1868 a grant from the Département du Nord allowed him to continue his studies in Paris at the famous École nationale supérieure des Beaux-Arts in the studio of Alexandre Cabanel. There he came under the influence of orientalism.

Comerre first exhibited at the Paris Salon in 1871 and went on to win prizes there in 1875 and 1881. In 1875, he won the Grand Prix de Rome for his painting "L’Ange annonçant aux bergers la naissance du Christ" (The Angel announcing the birth of Christ to the shepherds). This led to a scholarship at the French Academy in Rome from January 1876 to December 1879. In 1885 he won a prize at the "Exposition Universelle" in Antwerp. He also won prestigious art prizes in the USA (1876) and Australia (1881 and 1897). He became a Knight of the Legion of Honour in 1903.

He exhibited in London at the Royal Academy and the Royal Society of Portrait Painters, and in Glasgow at the Glasgow Institute of the Fine Arts.

In 1884, he moved to Vésinet, a suburb of Paris, where he remained until his death in 1916.

His wife Jacqueline Comerre-Paton was also a painter. His nephew was the renowned artist Albert Gleizes.

A catalogue raisonné of Comerre's work was published in 1980 by Les Presses Artistiques, Paris.

== Major works ==
- 1875: L'Annonce aux bergers
- 1878: Jézabel dévorée par les chiens
- 1878: Junon
- 1879: Le Lion amoureux
- 1880: Portrait de Jeune Fille
- 1881: Samson et Dalila
- 1882: Albine morte
- 1882: L' Étoile
- 1883: Silène et les Bacchantes
- 1883: Portrait de Mademoiselle Achille Fould
- 1884: Madeleine
- 1884: Pierrot
- 1888: Le Printemps, le Destin et l'Hiver (triptyque)
- 1903: À bicyclette au Vésinet
Selected works

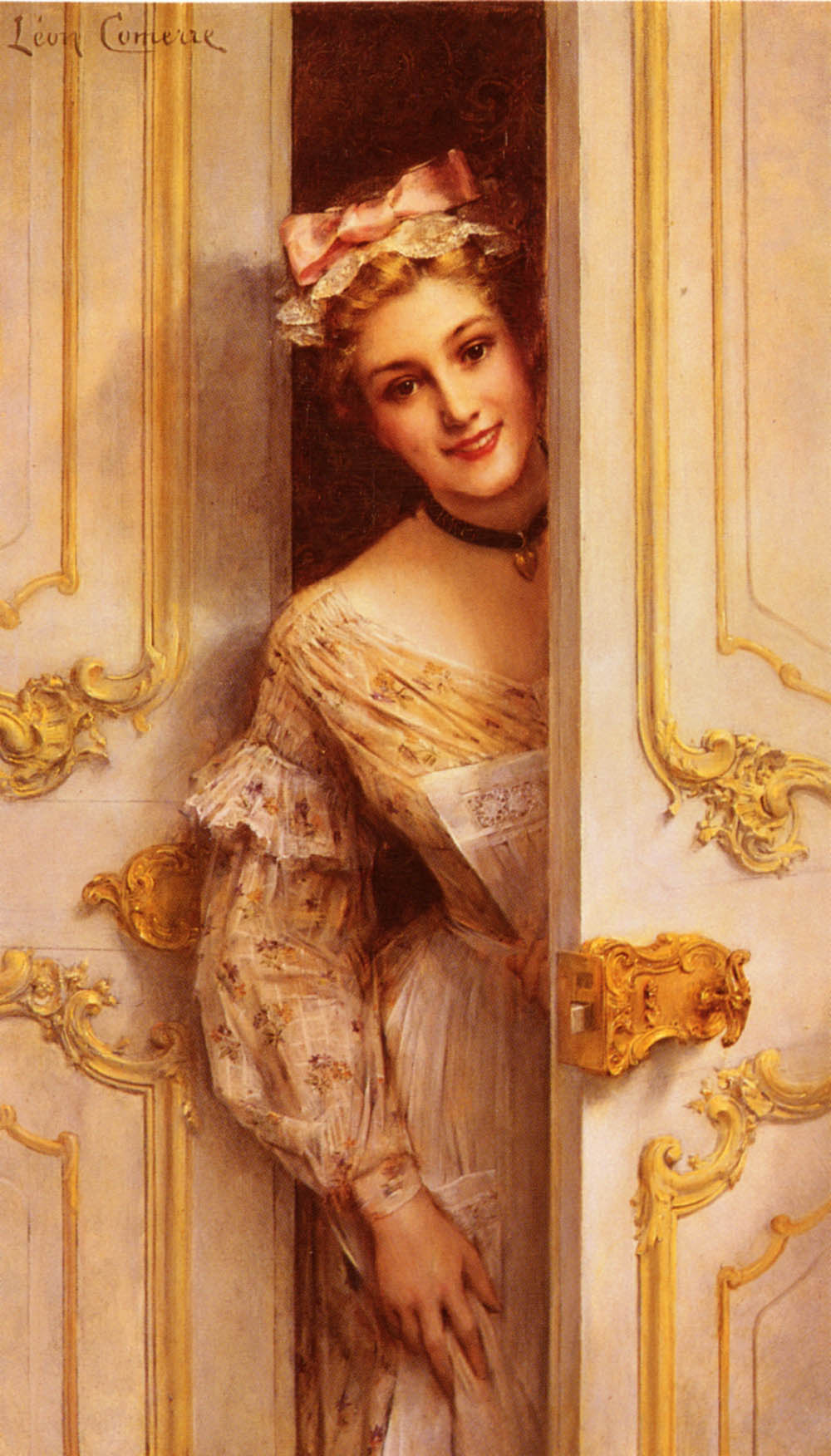
The Pretty Maid

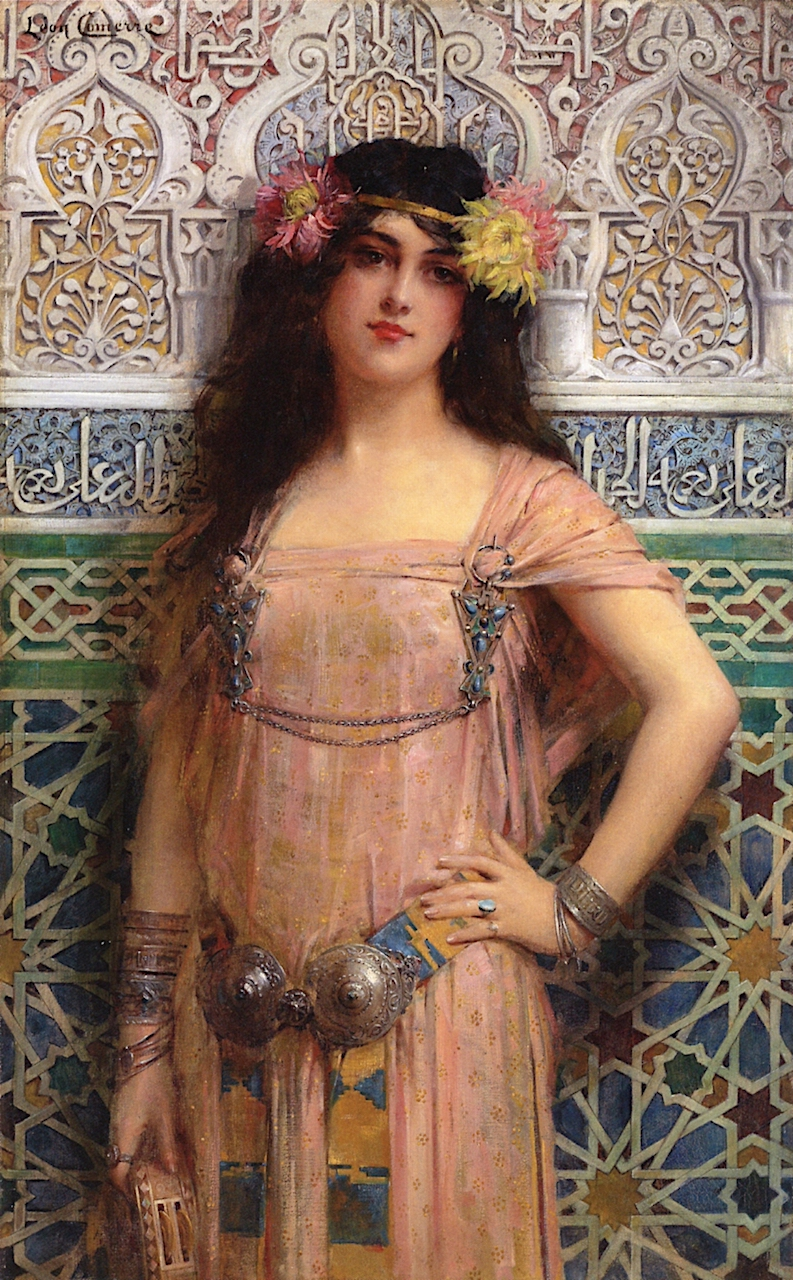
The Favorite, private collection

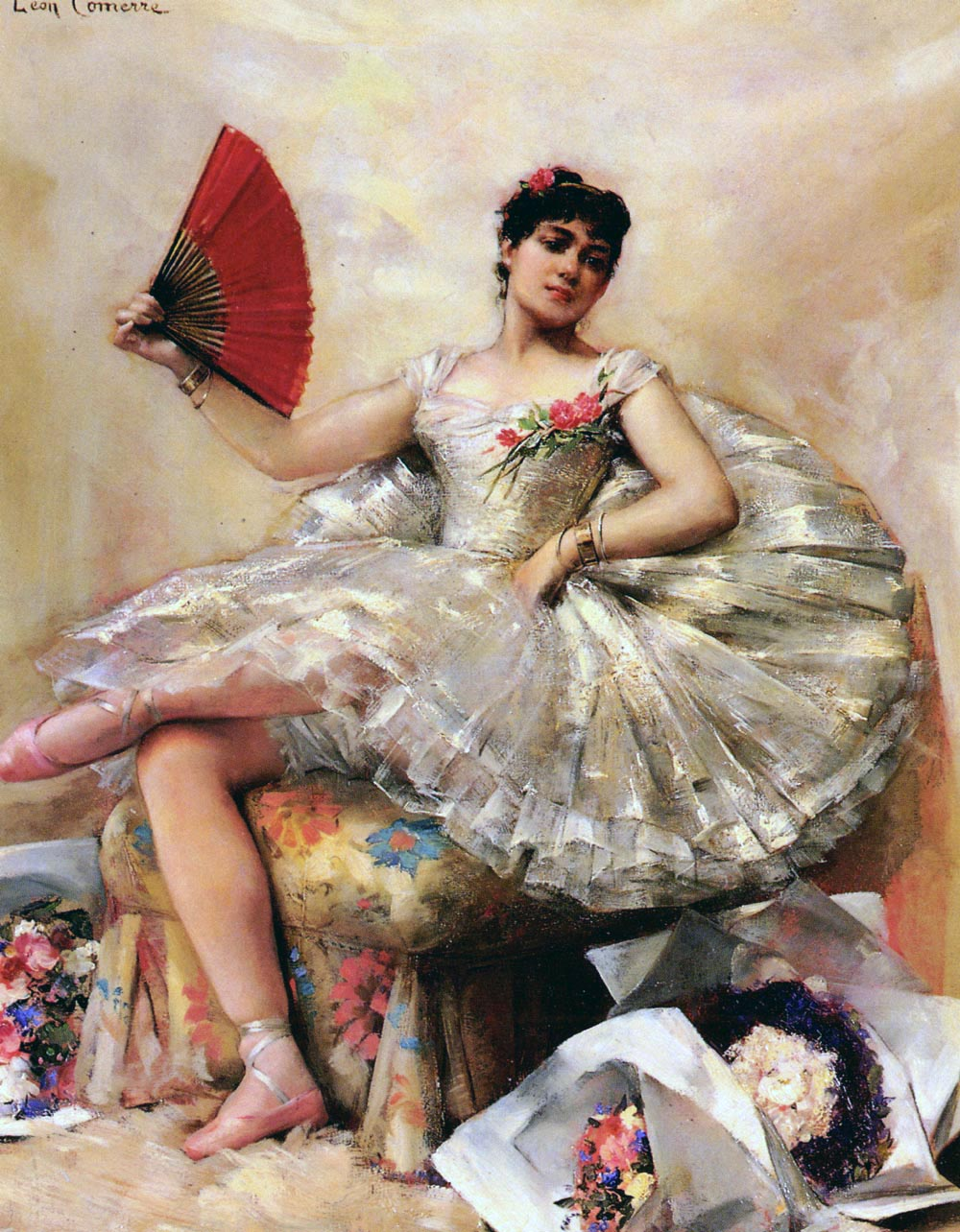
Portrait Of The Ballerina Rosita Mauri

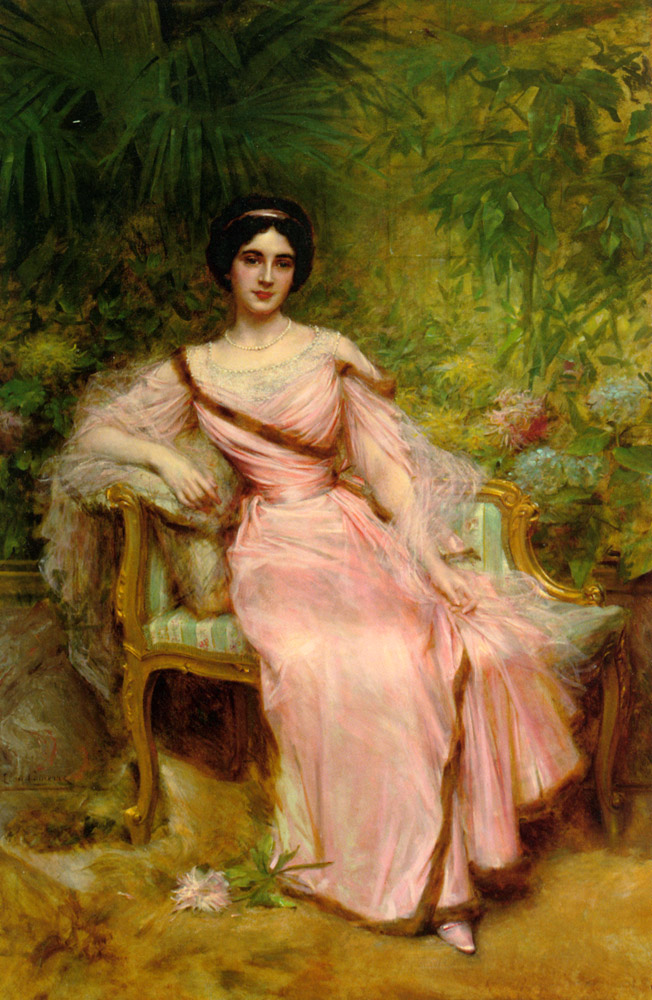
Portrait of Suzanne Hudelo

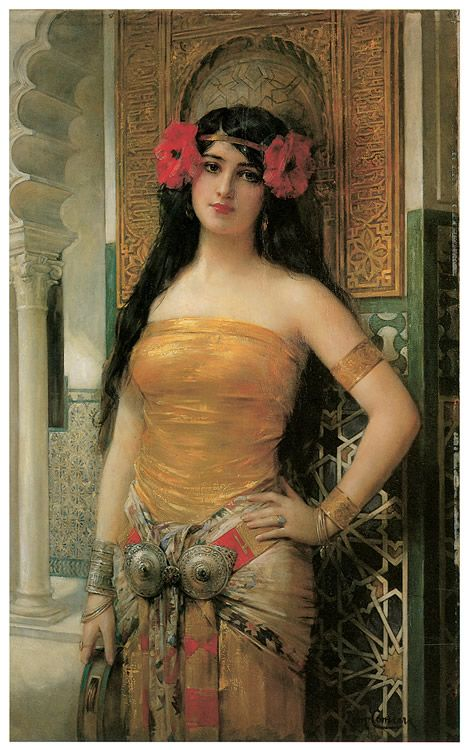
L'Odalisque

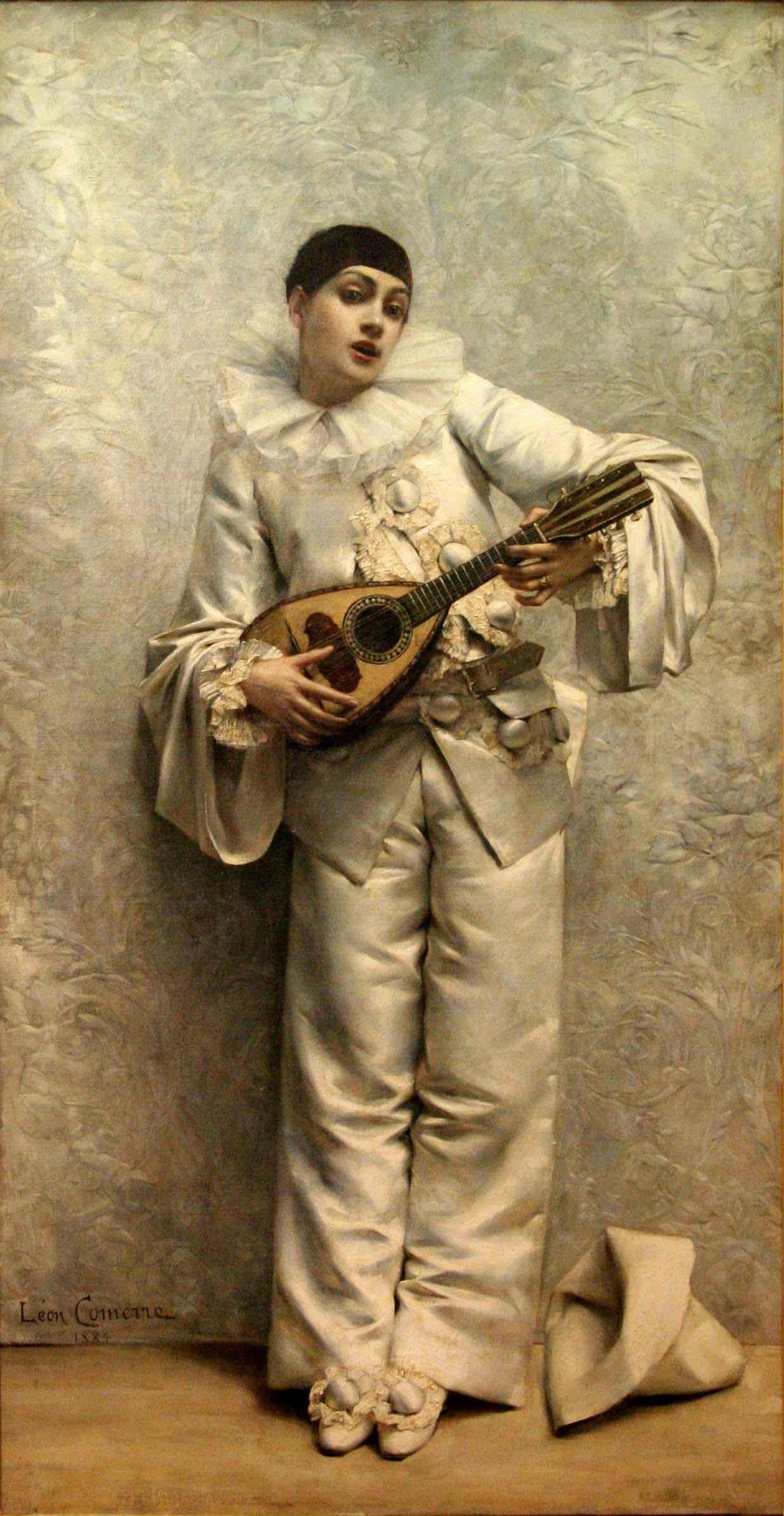
Pierrot playing the mandolin

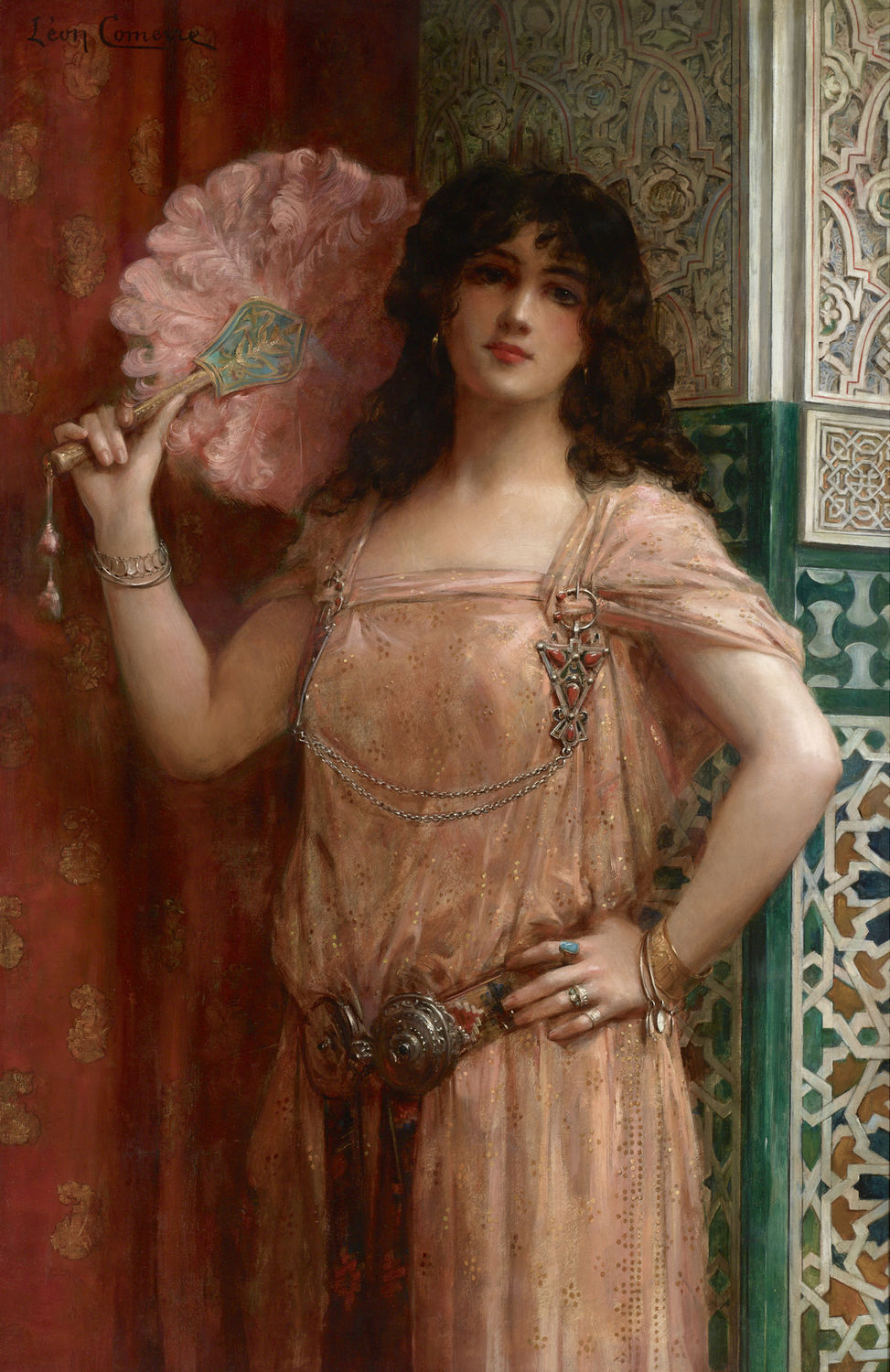
L'odalisque à l'éventail
