= Peter Bohren =

Swiss mountaineer (1822–1882)

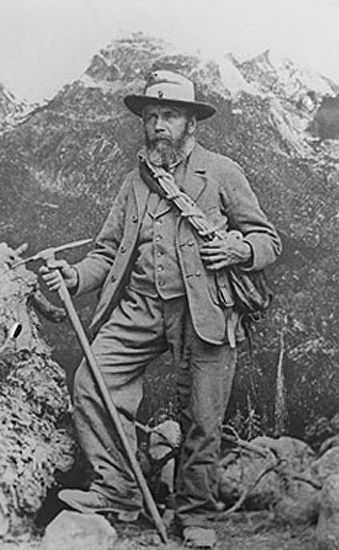
Peter Bohren

Peter Bohren (20 June 1822 – 4 July 1882) was a Swiss mountain guide from Grindelwald.

Peter Bohren made three first ascents in the Bernese Alps. On 11 August 1858 he jointly made the first ascent of the Eiger (3967 m above sea level), climbing via the west face with fellow guide, Christian Almer, and Charles Barrington. The group started at 3:30 a.m at the Hotel Wengernalp and the mountaineers reached the summit of the Eiger in the fog at 12 noon.

The following year, he reached the Aletschhorn (4193 m) with two colleagues and a guest on 18 June 1859. His last first ascent was the Äbeni Flue (3962 m) together with a colleague and a guest via today's normal route (southwest flank and southeast ridge) on 27 August 1868.
