= Pietro Saporetti =

Italian painter

Pietro Saporetti (Bagnacavallo, 10 April 1832 – Bassano del Grappa, 17 September 1893) was an Italian painter.

In Bagnacavallo his father was a teacher of Physics and mathematics at the Lyceum. He took his first lesson in Bagnacavallo, under Antonio Moni. In 1851, he went to study painting in Florence. In 1854, he studied at the Academy of Fine Arts in Venice under Luigi Ferrari, professor of sculpture. In 1855, he returned to Florence, where he painted Christ exorcises a demon. Finally he moved to Rome. The political events of 1859 exiled him back to Bagnacavallo, until 1867 he was hired as an instructor of design at the Technical Institute and Academy of Fine Arts of Ravenna.

Among his paintings are: Lavoro e Carità (small size); Un vecchio cacciatore (life-size and found in the Galleria Rasponi of Ravenna); Una finita ai carcerati (life-size and exhibited in 1873 at Vienna); La buona sorellina (small size and once in the Galleria Sollian of Trieste); Un novello Atteone (1877 exhibited at Naples); Castelli in aria (life-size, 1878); Una emancipata (life-size and exhibited at Turin in 1880); Un sequestro nell ' educandato (half-size); Preghiera del mattino (half size); Pensiero giovanile (small size and once found in galleria Sollian of Trieste).

He was the father of the painter Edgardo Saporetti.
