= Aletschhorn =

Mountain in the Bernese Alps

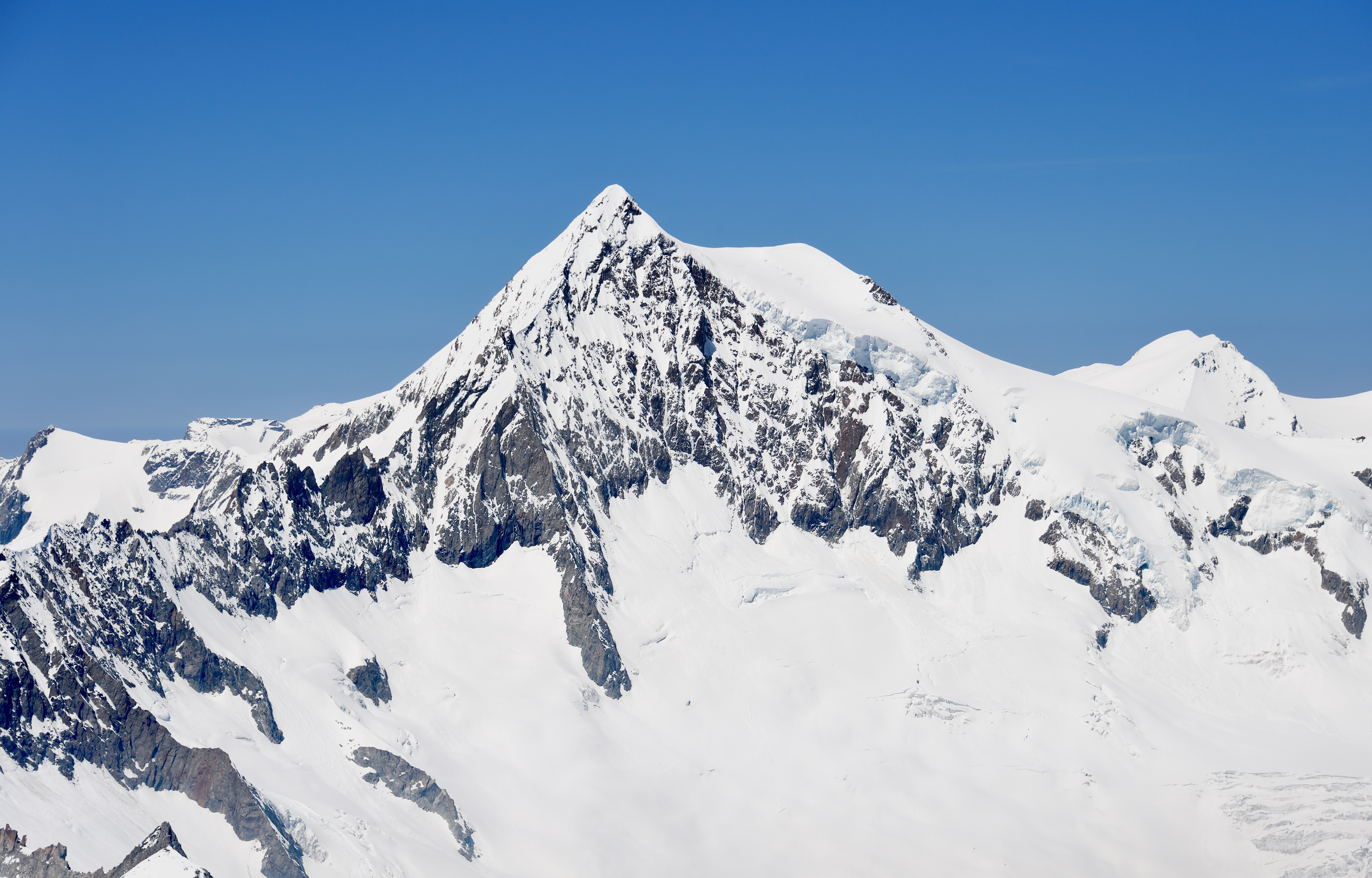

Highest point
- Elevation: 4,194 m (13,760 ft)
- Prominence: 1,041 m (3,415 ft)
- Parent peak: Finsteraarhorn
- Isolation: 12.9 km (8.0 mi)
- Coordinates: 46°27′54.36″N 7°59′37.18″E

Geography
- Location within Switzerland
- Location: Valais, Switzerland
- Parent range: Bernese Alps
- Topo map: Swisstopo 1269 Aletschgletscher

Climbing
- First ascent: 18 June 1859 by Francis Fox Tuckett with guides Johann Joseph Bennen, Peter Bohren and V. Tairraz
- Easiest route: South-west ridge

The Aletschhorn (Swiss Standard German pronunciation: [ˈaːlɛtʃˌhɔrn]; 4,194 m (13,760 ft)) is a mountain in the Alps in Switzerland, lying within the Jungfrau-Aletsch region, which has been designated a World Heritage Site by UNESCO. The mountain shares part of its name with the Aletsch Glacier lying at its foot.

The Aletschhorn, the second highest mountain of the Bernese Alps after the Finsteraarhorn, is the only one of the higher peaks that lies completely in Valais. It is the culminating point of a chain running parallel with the dividing ridge, and surpassing it in the height of its principal peaks. Standing thus between the principal range of the Bernese Alps and the Pennine chain, it shares with the Bietschhorn the advantage of occupying a central position in relation to the high peaks around it. The Aletschhorn is often thought to command the finest of all the panoramic views from Alpine summits.

== Geography ==
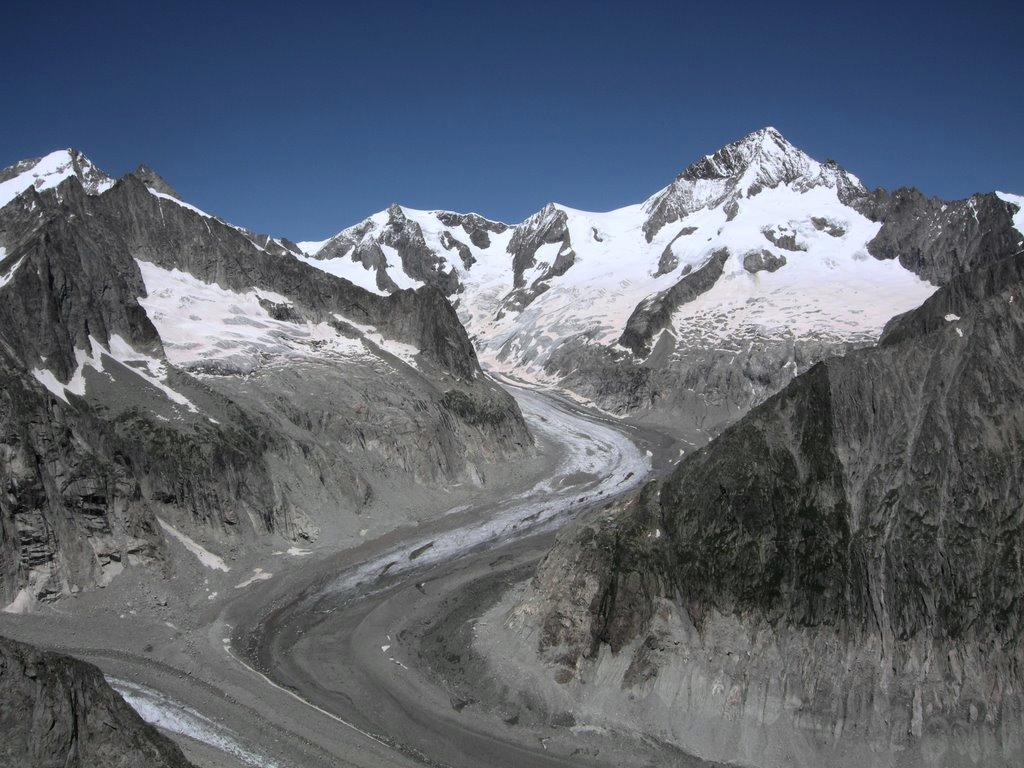
The Aletschhorn (right) from the Oberaletsch Glacier

On its northern flank lies the Aletschfirn, which is part of the Aletsch Glacier. On the southwest lies the Oberaletsch Glacier and, on the southeast, lies the Mittelaletsch Glacier. Both are in the catchment area of the Massa river, which originates in the Aletsch Glacier and ends up in the Rhone river. Its remote location in the middle of glaciers means that the Aletschhorn, despite its height, is less frequently visited and less well known than the summits of the Jungfrau and the Eiger, which lie about 10 km on the north.

The Aletschorn has four significant sub-peaks: the Kleines Aletschhorn (3,745 m (12,287 ft)) is situated west of the main-summit. In the south-ridge are located the southeast-ridge-gendarm pt 3,948 m (12,953 ft), a prominent double-tower (ca. 3,744 m (12,283 ft)) and the quadruple-tower pt 3,716 m (12,192 ft).

== Climbing history ==
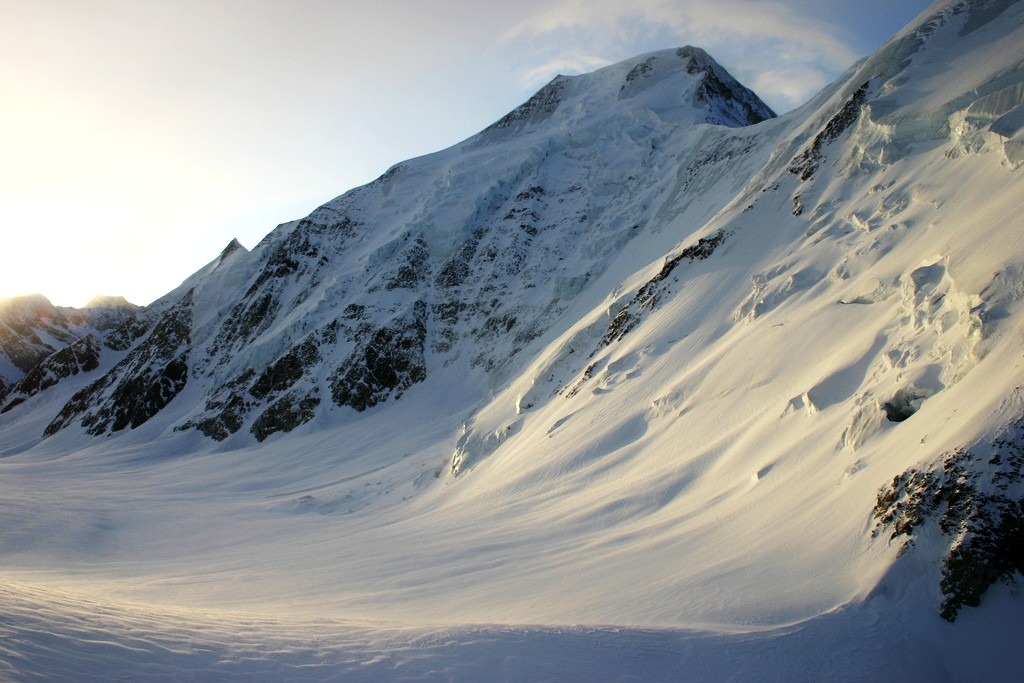
North face of the Aletschhorn from the Lötschenlücke

The Aletschhorn was first climbed almost 50 years after the first ascent of the Jungfrau. When the Jungfrau was first climbed, the climbers used base camps on the Aletschfirn, at the foot of the Aletschhorn.

The Aletschhorn was climbed first in 1859 by Francis Fox Tuckett, J. J. Bennen, V. Tairraz and P. Bohren. The party passed the night in some holes in the rocks above the Mittel Aletsch Glacier (on the east side of the mountain), and on the following morning, on 18 June, started the ascent and reached the snow arête connecting the Dreieckhorn with the main peak. The passage along this arête at a so early period of the year, before the snow has become well consolidated, involved some risk and a slope of névé lying at an angle of 50°, required care and good step-cutting. But the summit could be reached without too much difficulty. Like many other climbers, Tuckett took with him a barometer and made scientific observations. He noted the icy temperature and the very strong wind, blowing the snow and threatening to knock over the climbers.

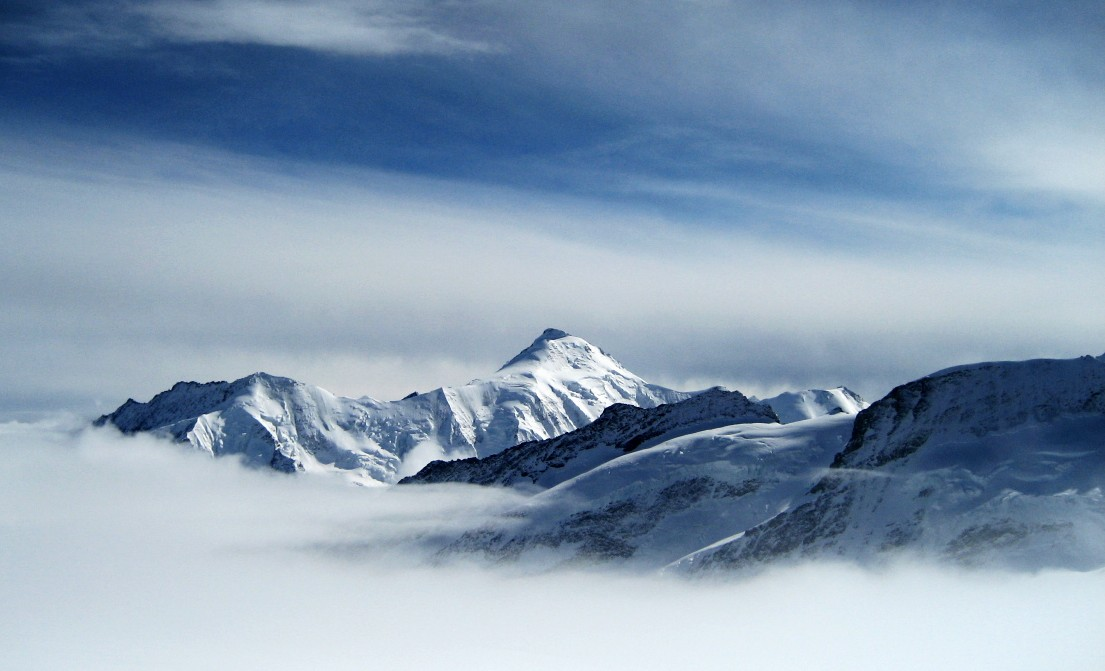
The Aletschhorn from the Jungfraujoch

After they reached the summit, Tuckett separated from Bennen and descended via the north face with Bohren and Tairraz. He wanted to descend directly to the Lötschental, but soon after they began the descent, an avalanche started right under the feet of the climbers. They cautiously went back and descended on the Mittelaletsch.

In 1863 Emma Winkworth, who was the daughter of Thomas Thomasson, became the first woman to climb the Aletschhorn.

== Climbing routes ==
Northeast ridge

- Difficulty: PD+
- Starting point: Mittelaletschbiwak (3,013 m)
- Valley: Fiesch (1,049 m)

Southwest ridge

- Difficulty: AD, II
- Starting point: Oberaletschhütte (2,640 m)
- Valley: Blatten bei Naters (1,322 m)

== See also ==
- List of 4000 metre peaks of the Alps
