= Stanisław Roman Lewandowski =

Polish sculptor

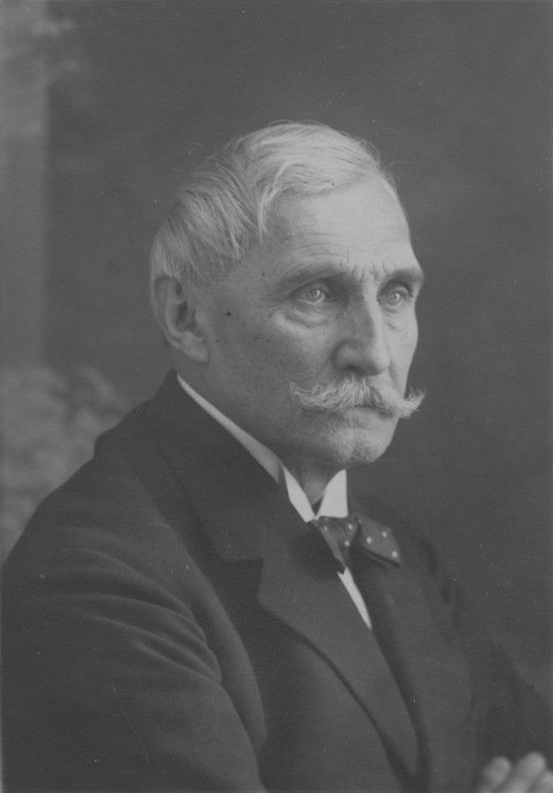

Stanisław Roman Lewandowski (1859–1940) was a Polish sculptor.
