= Brestanica =

Brestanica Rajhenburg (until 1952)
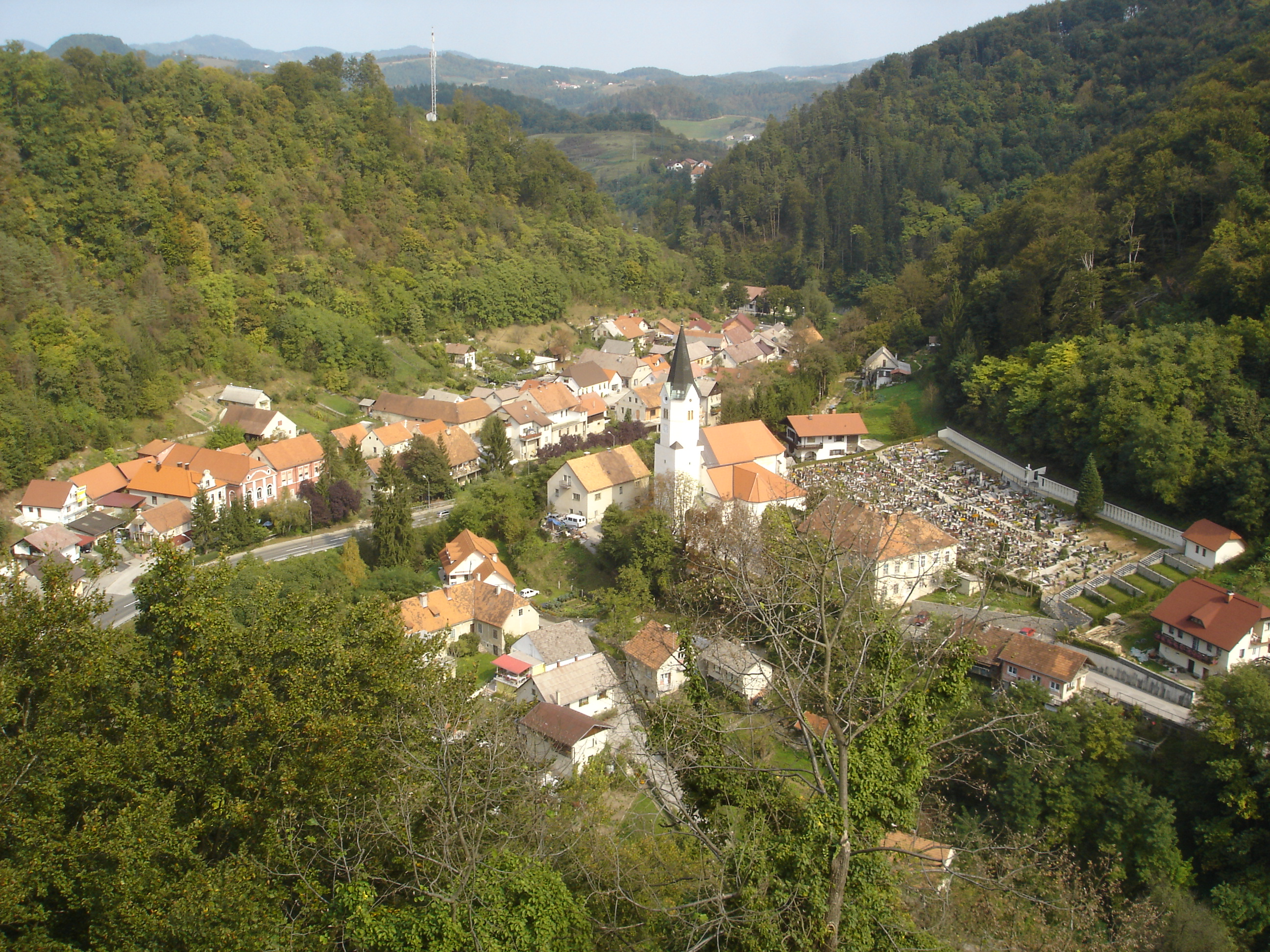

- Location in Slovenia
- Coordinates: 45°59′46.01″N 15°28′37.71″E
- Country: Slovenia
- Traditional region: Styria
- Statistical region: Lower Sava
- Municipality: Krško

Area
  - Total: 2.88 km^{2} (1.11 sq mi)
- Elevation: 177.9 m (584 ft)

Population (2012)
  - Total: 963
  - Density: 334/km^{2} (870/sq mi)

Brestanica (pronounced [ˈbɾeːstanitsa]) is an urban settlement in the Municipality of Krško in eastern Slovenia. It lies in the valley at the confluence of the Sava River with a minor tributary called the Brestanica. The area is part of the traditional region of Styria. It is now included with the rest of the municipality in the Lower Sava Statistical Region.

== Name ==
The settlement was originally called Rajhenburg in Slovene, after Reichenburg Castle in the settlement. This name was attested in written sources in 895 as Richenburch. The name of the settlement was changed from Rajhenburg to Brestanica in 1952. The name was changed on the basis of the 1948 Law on Names of Settlements and Designations of Squares, Streets, and Buildings as part of efforts by Slovenia's postwar communist government to remove German elements from toponyms. The name Brestanica was originally a hydronym referring to Brestanica Creek, which runs through the settlement and is a tributary of the Sava River. The creek name was attested in written sources circa 1500 as Brestanza, and in the 16th century as Prestonicz. The hydronym is derived from *Brěstovьnica (based on the common noun *brěstъ 'elm'), literally meaning 'elm creek'.

== History ==
A prehistoric settlement probably stood on the hill above Brestanica, where the castle is now located. Remnants of the Roman era include milestones from the Roman road along the Sava and traces of a bridge across the river. A settlement was attested below Rajhenburg castle as early as the 13th century, and it received market rights in the 14th century, including the right to four annual fairs. The settlement was plundered and burned in an Ottoman attack in 1476. Unsuccessful peasant attacks on the castle occurred in 1515, 1573, and 1583. In 1595, the archbishop of Salzburg granted the settlement and castle to the Moscon family, who were followed by the Gradneck, Gallenstein, and Attems families. A school was established in Brestanica in 1774. On 5 November 1918, armed miners and farmers marched on Brestanica, demanding that merchants sell them goods at low cost. The Communist Party had a strong presence in Brestanica from 1938 onward.

=== Mass grave ===
Brestanica is the site of a mass grave associated with the Second World War. The Hafnar Ravine Mass Grave (Slovene: Grobišče Hafnarjev graben) is located in the Hafnar Ravine along Suhadol Creek, opposite Rajhenburg Castle. It contains the remains of up to 186 Croatian and Serbian soldiers, as well as 20 to 30 Slovene civilians.

== Rajhenburg Castle ==
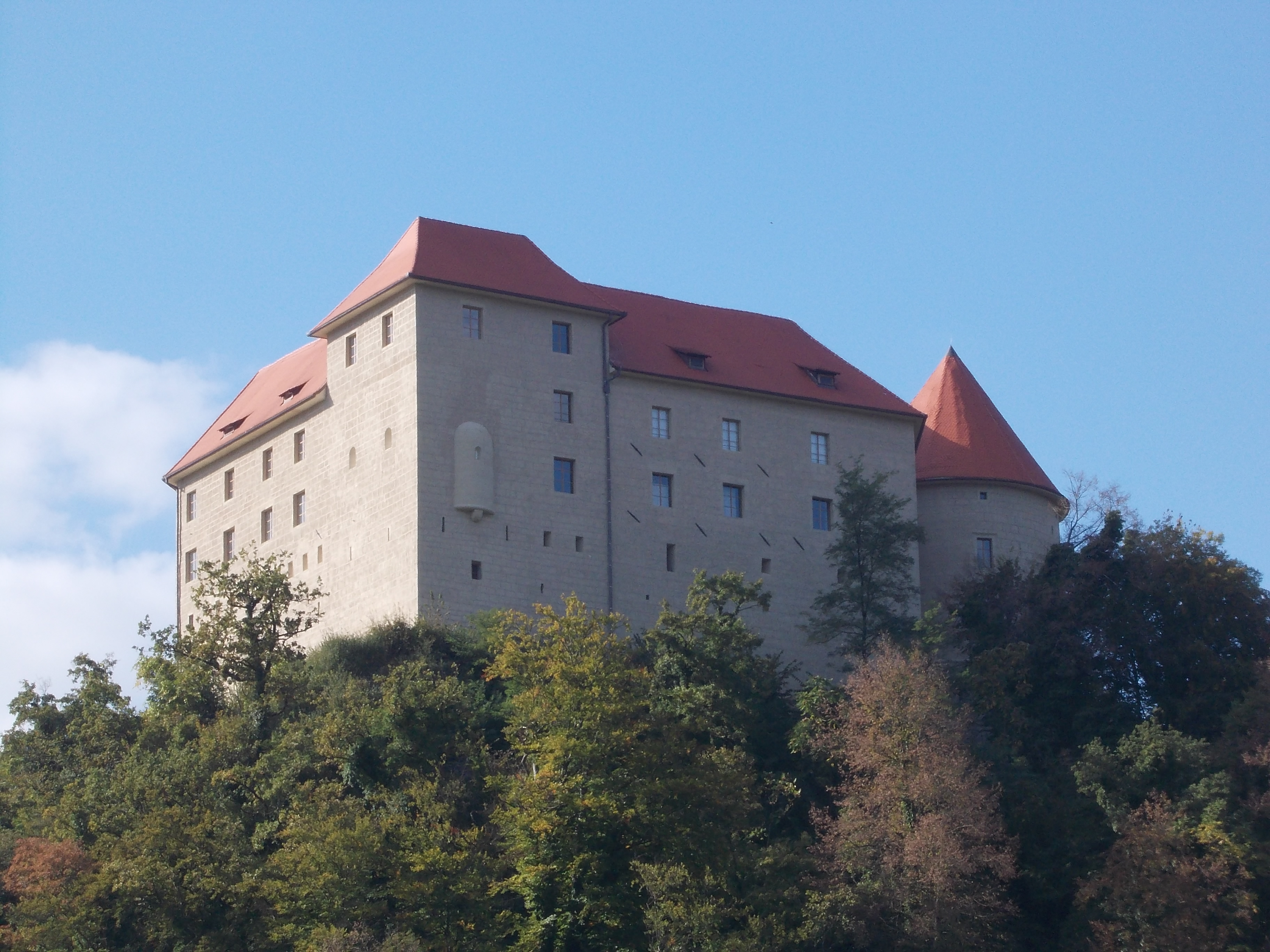
Rajhenburg Castle

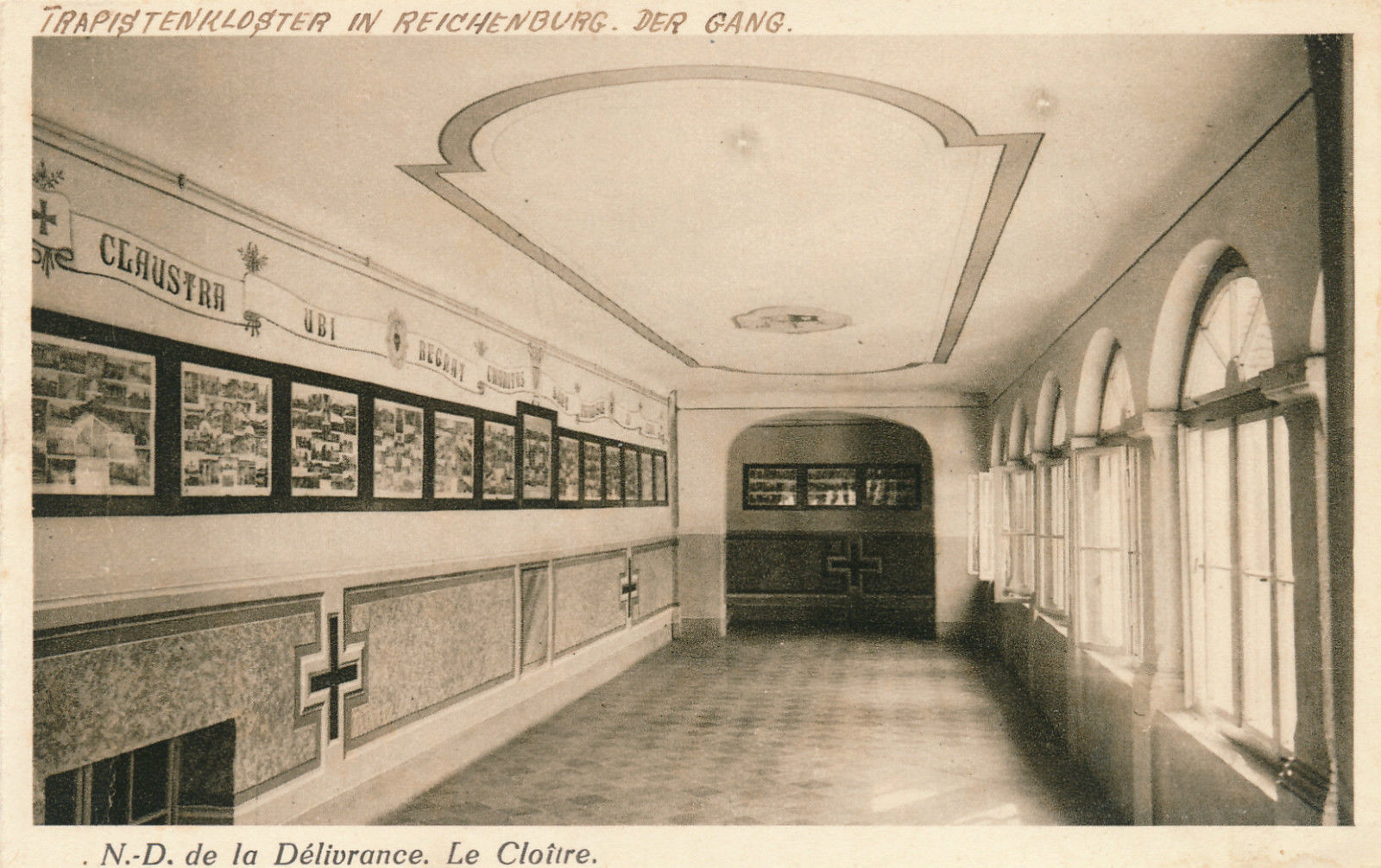
Deliverance of Mary Abbey of the Trappist order in Rajhenburg Castle (1927)

On a hill on the right bank of the Sava River, south of the settlement, is Rajhenburg Castle (Slovene: Grad Rajhenburg). It was first mentioned in written documents dating to AD 895, making it the earliest documented castle in Slovenia. It has preserved some of its Romanesque features and an early Gothic chapel, but most of its current structure dates to around 1600. During the Second World War it was used as a deportee collection centre by the German forces. From June 1948 to October 1956 the communist authorities used the castle as a penal institution for female political prisoners.

== Churches ==
The parish church in the town is a basilica dedicated to Our Lady of Lourdes and belongs to the Roman Catholic Diocese of Celje. It was built between 1908 and 1914 in a Neo-Romanesque style. Previously the parish church was a church in the southern part of the settlement, dedicated to Saints Peter and Paul. It was first mentioned in written documents dating to 1213, but the current building was built in 1341 with a 17th-century belfry and two 18th-century side chapels. A third church in the town, close to the parish church, is dedicated to Saint Sebastian. On a hill to the east of the settlement a further church is dedicated to Saints Hermagoras and Fortunatus. It was built in the late 15th century and has a chapel dedicated to Saint Notburga with well preserved, high-quality wall paintings.

== Notable people ==
Notable people that were born or lived in Brestanica include:

- Adam Bohorič (c. 1520–1598), Protestant preacher, teacher, and author of the first grammar of Slovene

== Transport ==
Brestanica has been linked via railway with Zidani Most and Zagreb since 1861. The principal station in the settlement is the Brestanica railway station.
