= Gustav Globočnik Edler von Vojka =

Gustav Viktor Josef Globočnik Edler von Vojka
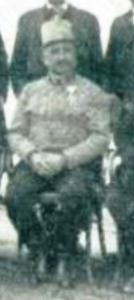
- Born: 10 November 1859; Reichenburg, Untersteiermark, Herzogtum Steiermark, Austrian Empire
- Died: 24 September 1946 (aged 86); Vienna, Austria
- Relatives: Alexander Valerian Globočnik Edler von Vojka
- Military career
- Allegiance: (Austria-Hungary) Austro-Hungarian Empire (to 1919)
- Service years: 1880–1919
- Rank: Feldmarschalleutnant
- Commands: Infantry Officer Cadet School, Trieste; 56th Infantry Regiment; 26th Gebirgsbrigade; 92nd Infantry Regiment; 33rd Infantry Regiment; Globočnik Group
- Conflicts: World War I: Serbian Campaign (World War I); Fifth Battle of the Isonzo; The Carinthian front
- Awards: Nobility: Edler von Vojka

Gustav Viktor Josef Globočnik Edler von Vojka (10 November 1859 – 24 September 1946) was an Austrian soldier and nobleman. He achieved rank of lieutenant field-marshal (Feldmarschalleutnant) in the Austro-Hungarian Army.

== Private life ==
Born in Reichenburg, Austrian Empire, today known as Brestanica in Slovenia. Brestanica is a small town located approximately 60 km from Zagreb, Croatia, and 100 km from Ljubljana, Slovenia. Globočnik is son of Viktor Globočnik and Sofija born Klemenčić. They had four children: three daughters and a son. Viktor Globočnik was k.u.k. financial consultor in Zagreb. Family Globočnik owned Thurn castle.

Gustav Globočnik was awarded for his military service and loyalty to the Habsburg dynasty with nobleman title Edler von Vojka by Diploma from 20 February 1917. He was also awarded with Honor Citizenship in several towns: Reichenburg (Brestanica), Feistritz, Domschale, Mitterndorf and Koprivnik (Carniola) Gustav Globočnik married Emma Julie Wüster in Vienna at 16 September 1893. They had one child, a son named Alexander Valerian.

== Career ==
Gustav Globočnik started his military career by graduation in Officer Cadet School on 18 August 1880. He was pensioned on 1 January 1919 in rank of Feldmarschalleutnant (equivalent to lieutenant field marshal in English).

=== Service record ===
- 1880–1888, 79th Infantry Regiment
- 1889–1890, 27th Infantry Regiment
- 1890–1896, 25th Infantry Division
- 1896–1901, 74th Infantry Regiment
- 1901–1905, Infantry Officer Cadet School, Trieste
- 1905–1908, 87th Infantry Regiment
- 1908–1912, 61st Infantry Regiment

=== Promotions ===
- 1 September 1901, Major
- 1 May 1909, Oberstleutnant
- 10 May 1912, Oberst
- 1 September 1915, Generalmajor
- 1 May 1918, Feldmarschalleutnant

== World War I ==
Gustav Globočnik in World War I was a commander of various formations in XV. Corps: 56th Infantry Regiment, 26th Gebirgsbrigade, 92nd Infantry Regiment, 33rd Infantry Regiment and Group Globočnik. He fought in the Serbian Campaign (World War I) and later on Battles of the Isonzo.

In Fifth Battle of the Isonzo that was fought from March 9–15, 1916, Generalmajor Gustav Globočnik fought as commander of Group Globočnik in X. Army under commandment of Generaloberst Franz Rohr von Denta.

== Alexander Valerian Globočnik Edler von Vojka ==
Alexander Globočnik-Vojka is a son of Gustav Globočnik Edler von Vojka and Emma Julie born Wüster. Due to his father's military career, his family often moved around Austrian-Hungarian Empire. Therefore, Alexander was born in Przemyśl, today in Poland on 10 January 1895. He was an Austro-Hungarian lawyer and nobleman. After the Austrian monarchy came down and Republic was established, nobility titles became forbidden so he used name Alexander Globočnik-Vojka. His most notable law case is Globočnik-Vojka vs Austria. Alexander Globočnik-Vojka died on 16 May 1974.

=== Globočnik-Vojka vs Austria ===
Following the collapse of the Austro-Hungarian Empire, the Austro-Hungarian bank was put into liquidation. Rights of the bondholders were settled in a 1939 extra-juridical settlement. Liquidators undertook to pay $210,000 to the bondholders out of monies then on deposit with the United States Treasury. Problem was that money was confiscated by the United States Government as enemy property during The First World War. Finally, the United States Office of Alien Property transferred a sum of just over $45,000 to the liquidators and authorized them to transfer it to the Austrian Government. Rest of the money was transferred to the governments of Italy and Yugoslavia. The plaintiff, representing the bondholders claimed that the Austrian Government would be unjustly enriched if it decided not to repay bondholders.

The Provincial Court for Civil Law Matters in Vienna by decree of 28 September 1951, appointed as curator and guardian of the rights of all the bondholders in the Austro-Hungarian bank in Vienna, Dr. Alexander Globočnik-Vojka. By the judgment of Austria Supreme Court from 14 May 1958, the appeal was dismissed. Bondholders did not succeed to retain money. The Case Globočnik-Vojka vs Austria became famous internationally through law circles.
