= Jacqueline Comerre-Paton =

French painter

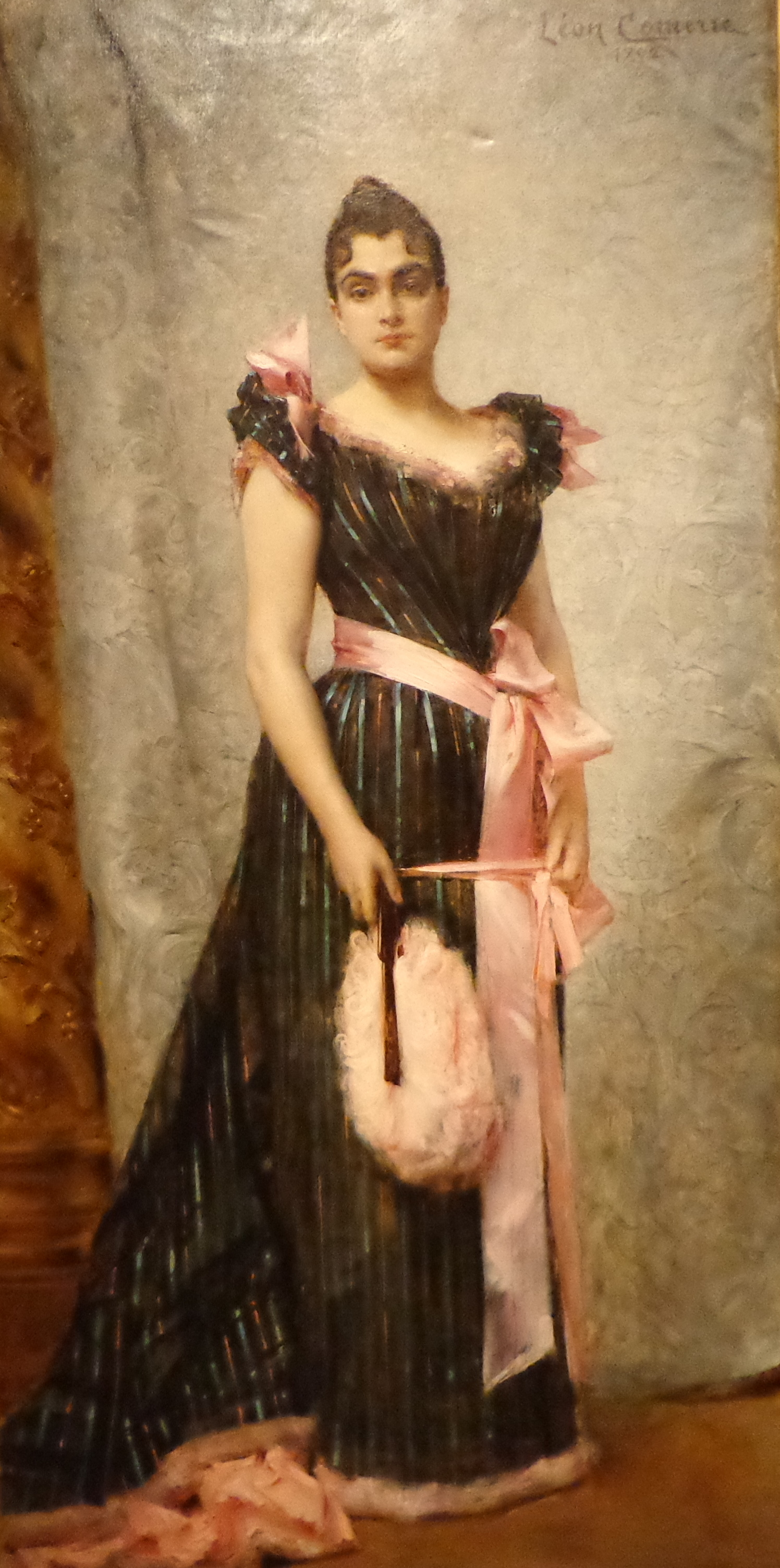
- Portrait of Jacqueline by Leon Comerre, 1892
- Born: 1 May 1859; Paris, France
- Died: 1955 (aged 95–96); Paris, France
- Education: École des Beaux-arts
- Known for: Painting; Sculpture
- Spouse: Leon Comerre

Jacqueline Comerre, née Paton (1 May 1859 – 1955) was a French painter and sculptor, and the wife of the painter Léon-François Comerre (1850–1916).

Comerre-Paton was born in Paris. Her mother was Émilie-Thérèse Paton (1820 - 1887), known by the pen of Jacques Rozier, a French novelist and playwright. Her father was economist Jules Paton, financial columnist at the Journal des débats.

Jacqueline studied at the École des Beaux-arts under Alexandre Cabanel. She was friends with portrait painter Fanny Caillé who reproduced one of her most famous paintings, At the spring .

She received an honorable mention in 1881 and a medal at the Versailles exhibition.

Her painting Mistletoe was included in the 1905 book Women Painters of the World.

Comerre-Paton died in Paris.

== Selected works ==
- The Annunciation
- An ass skin (Donkey skin)
- At the spring
- La chanson des bois
- Chaperon rouge
- Faneuse
- L'Ignorance
- Jeune fille aux papillons
- Jeune fille à la source
- Jeune Hollandaise
- Mignon
- Mistletoe
- Portrait de Mlle. Marguerite Ugalde
- Portrait de paysanne
- Sonioutchka
- A young beauty
- Young Dutch
