= Pomona (ship) =

Clipper ship (1856–1859)

History

United States
- Name: Pomona
- Owner: Howland & Frothington
- Port of registry: Boston
- Route: Liverpool to Port of New York
- Builder: George and Thomas Boole
- Launched: September 1856
- Completed: 1856
- Out of service: April 1859

General characteristics
- Type: Clipper
- Tons burthen: 1181 tons
- Decks: 2
- Boats & landing craft carried: 7
- Crew: 44

The Pomona was a fast packet clipper ship constructed in 1856 for Howland and Frothingham. She operated for just over two and a half years transporting emigrants and cargo from Liverpool, England to New York City. Pomona sank in the early morning of April 28, 1859 after a navigation error caused the ship to strike the coast of Ireland at County Wexford. 424 of the 448 people on board died.

== Construction and service ==
The Pomona was built by shipbuilders George and Thomas Boole of East Boston in September 1856. The ship was owned by Howland and Frothingham. She was named for the Roman goddess of fruit and fruit trees and had a full figurehead of the goddess on her bow.

The Pomona offered transport for emigrants and cargo from Liverpool to New York through the Tapscott's line. The ship's tonnage seems to have been inflated in advertisements from its 1181 tons burthen, perhaps to make it appear safer to prospective passengers.

Pomona was captained by Captain Charles Merrihew for her whole service. She arrived in New York for the first time 29 September 1856. She cleared New York to Liverpool for her first voyage on 20 October 1856 and arrived 17 November 1856.

Like many emigrant ships of the day, Pomona was considered a fast packet clipper ship. She carried both passengers and cargo. For example, on her arrival in New York on 9 July 1857, she carried 482 passengers as well as merchandise, completing her journey in 32 days. She carried 328 passengers and merchandise on her arrival in New York on 12 November 1857, but only 30 passengers on arrival 21 March 1857 after a journey with "light winds and pleasant weather".

Samuel Walters, an English maritime artist, painted the Pomona in 1858.

== Final voyage and loss ==
Nautical chart of the east coast of Ireland from Wexford to Wicklow, 1873. Blackwater bank is shown north of Wexford Harbour.

The Pomona sailed from Liverpool on the 27 of April, 1859, at 5am. She was carrying 448 souls, consisting of a crew of 44 men and boys, 7 cabin passengers, and 393 intermediate passengers. Four passengers were found to have been smuggled on board. Weather conditions were initially favourable and survivors talked of music and dancing on board.

The wind became stronger through the evening. Around midnight, a light was seen which the Captain misidentified as the Tuskar Rock light. He veered the ship N.N.E., not knowing the light was fact the lightship at the north end of the Blackwater Bank. It had been put in place only two years earlier as an additional warning for mariners (the lightship was replaced by a buoy in 1968). The Captain's navigation error caused the ship to sail directly towards the Irish coast. Pomona struck the Blackwater Bank, near the beaches of Ballyconigar, Blackwater, at 4am. The force was enough to bring passengers and crew onto the deck.

She remained stuck fast in the strong winds. Attempts were made to launch the two lifeboats to allow the crew and passengers to reach land, but the boats were quickly swamped by the stormy sea. All but one of the sailors trying to launch were lost overboard.

Between 1pm and 2pm, the Pomona slipped off the bank back into deeper water. The Captain ordered the anchor cast, perhaps to pull the ship back onto the sandbank, but this was unsuccessful. The ship rapidly gained water despite the efforts of both the crew and some passengers, who had been working the pumps.

The long-boat was then launched, but it was damaged in the attempt. Six crewmen were on board, but four were washed overboard before they made land. The final boat available was the whale boat. This was launched into the heavy seas, reaching land safely. There were 22 men on board, including 19 crewmen including the third mate and passengers' cook, and 3 passengers.

Attempts to reach the Pomona were hampered by the poor weather conditions. The steam tug Erin was based at Wexford and was prepared to tow the lifeboat to the wreck, but was unable to make the 10 mile journey until the weather cleared. The tides prevented the larger steam ships within Wexford Harbour from offering assistance.

After coming free of the bank, the Pomona sank in less than an hour. All still on board died, including the Captain. The official loss of life according to the Board of Trade Inquiry was 424 people. 24 were saved.

== Aftermath ==
The coastguards from Wexford reached the wreck on 29 April. They were able to take the colours from the mizzen mast, the only part of the ship visible above the water. A full list of the passengers and crew was printed in the Wexford Constitution on 4 May 1859.

Many bodies came ashore in the following days and months, some still in their nightclothes. There were reports of looting from the bodies of the victims, although the items taken from the bodies did not always include valuables. The Captain's body was found on 1 June 1859. He was identified by the ship's papers found on his person, including the ship's register. His body was interred locally, before being exhumed and transported to New York at the request of his family and friends. Bodies continued to wash ashore in to December as the ship slowly broke apart.

The Board of Trade Inquiry was held between 7 and 9 May 1859, overseen by nautical assessor Captain Harris. Its report was published on 28 May. He bemoaned the quality of the evidence of 'from the most part illiterate seamen' and relied upon other evidence available. The inquiry's conclusion was 'that the ship was lost by default of the master'. Particular mention was made of the lack of soundings taken to verify the ship's position when the light that was presumed to be Tuskar Rock was sighted. Rumours of drunkenness and disorder were disproven.

The hull was put up for auction 9 August 1859, but there were no bids as the prospect of raising her did not attract sufficient interest. The wreck of the ship can still be found in the same area where she sank.

== Memorials ==
A memorial stone was unveiled at the bridge in the centre of Blackwater village on 31 May 2009 to mark the 150 anniversary of the sinking. It reads, "On 27th April 1859 a 1400 ton ship called the Pomona left Liverpool bound for New York with 404 passengers and a crew of 44 under Captain Charles Merrihew. Three hundred and sixteen of these passengers were Irish heading for a new life in America. The following day the ship, which was off course, sank in stormy seas northeast of Ballyconnigar on the Blackwater Bank. Only 24 survived, 19 of these were crew members."

The ballad 'The Pomona' was collected by Joseph Ranson C.C. in 1937 in Songs of the Wexford Coast. The modern ballad The Wreck of the Pomona was written and performed by Patrick Karnahan and Black Irish Band.
