= Vittorio Alinari =

Italian photographer (1859–1932)

- Born: 1859
- Died: 1932 (aged 72–73)
- Occupation: Photographer

Vittorio Alinari (1859 – 1932) was an Italian photographer. His father, Leopoldo Alinari, founded a photographic company in 1854 and his brothers Giuseppe and Romualdo, soon became partners in the firm, which was known for its specialty of documenting masterpieces of art. In 1892 Vittorio took over the firm and shifted the emphasis to Italian documentary photography. His work is known for careful composition, frequent use of frontal perspective, and the large plate (approximately 21 cm x 27 cm) format he used until the 1920s.

In 1900 he published an illustrated edition of Dante's Divina Commedia, recruiting prominent contemporary artists for the illustrations.

== Bibliography ==
- Jeffrey, Ian et al. (1997). The Photography Book. London:Phaidon Press Limited. ISBN 0-7148-4488-8
