= Karl von Urban =

Austrian field marshal-lieutenant (1802–1877)

Karl Baron of Urban
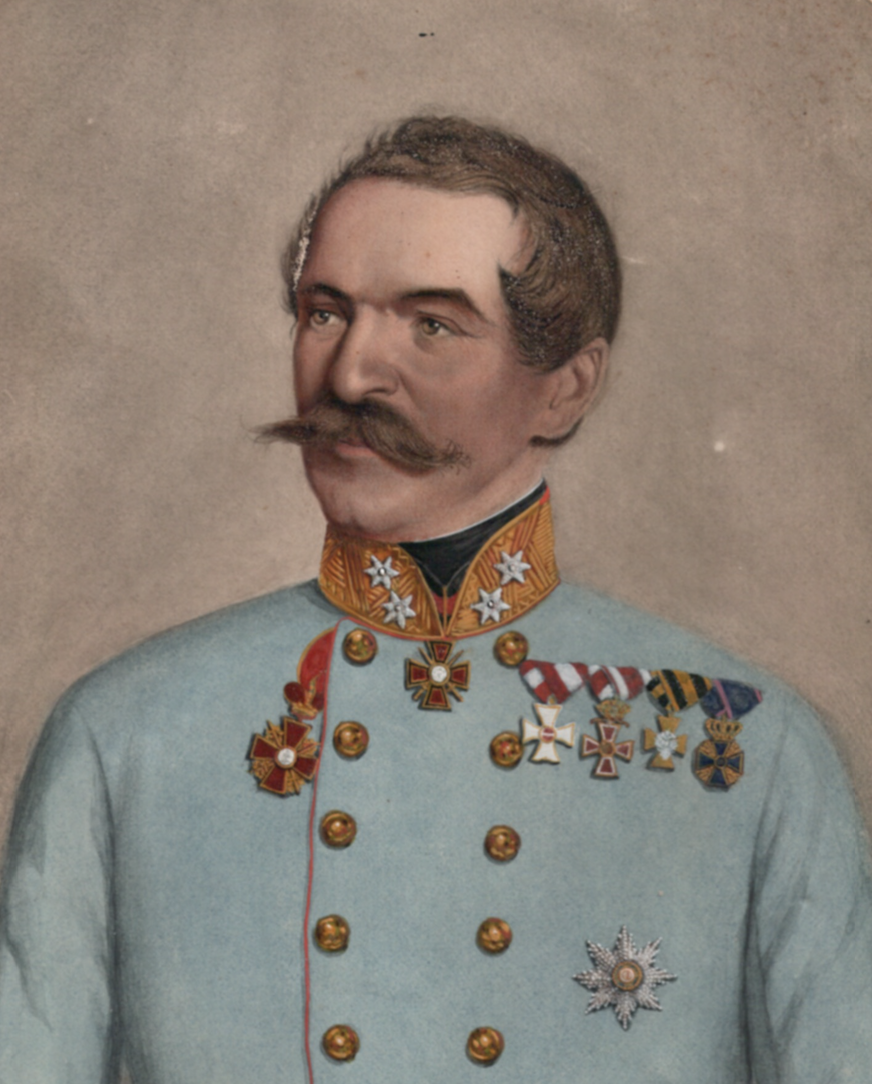
- Karl von Urban, c. 1857
- Native name: Karl Freiherr von Urban
- Born: 31 August 1802; Kraków, Kingdom of Galicia and Lodomeria, Austrian Empire
- Died: 1 January 1877 (aged 74) Brünn, Margraviate of Moravia, Austria-Hungary
- Allegiance: (Austria-Hungary) Austrian Empire
- Branch: Imperial and Royal Army
- Service years: 1815–1865
- Rank: Feldmarschall-leutnant (Field Marshal-Lieutenant)
- Commands: 2. Romanian Border Infantry Regiment; Military District Commander of Transylvania; Division commander in the VII. Army Corps; IX. Army Corps (Division Urban); Fortress of Verona; IV. Army Corps
- Conflicts: Revolution in Sardinia-Piedmont: Battle of Novara; Hungarian Revolution of 1848: Battle of Voivodeni; Battle of Szamos-újvár; Battle of Szamosfalva; Capture of Klausenburg; Battle of Dés; Battle of Ciucea Pass; Raid on Marossény; Battle of Király-németi; Second Italian War of Independence: Battle of Montebello; Battle of Varese; Battle of San Salvatore; Battle of San Fermo; Battle of Treponti (Castenedolo)

Karl (Carl) Freiherr von Urban (English: Karl Baron of Urban; Hungarian: Báró Urban Károly; French: Baron Carl d'Urban; born 31 August 1802 in Kraków – died 1 January 1877 in Brünn) was an Austrian Field Marshal-Lieutenant celebrated for his daring tactics of lightning surprise attacks, often against much stronger forces, which earned him the epithet of Austrian Garibaldi.

He is particularly distinguished for his decisive actions during the Hungarian Revolution of 1848-1849, and his participation in the Second Italian War of Independence in 1859. Von Urban was the first commander to make a stand against the Revolution in Hungary, organizing the resistance and defending minorities. He captured Klausenburg, the capital of Transylvania, twice.

== Early years and baptism of fire ==
Karl von Urban was born in Krakow, at the time part of the Austrian Empire, to a Sudeten German family of officers who served the Imperial Army. He received his education at the prestigious Cadet Academy of Olmütz (Olomouc) and enrolled in the Imperial and Royal Army on 1 November 1815, being assigned to the 29th Infantry Regiment.

When the Revolution erupted in the Kingdom of Sardinia-Piedmont in 1821, the Quintuple Alliance was assembled at the Congress of Laibach and Prince Metternich decided to intervene to restore the legitimate government. At the time a young cadet corporal, Urban was selected to integrate the Austrian expeditionary force sent in the name of the Holy Alliance and underwent his baptism of fire at the Battle of Novara on 8 April 1821.

=== Ascension in the military career ===
After Novara, Urban's progress in the ranks of the Army was meteoric and he performed a variety of prestigious roles. This swift progress was attributed to his strong expertise and remarkable adaptability. He was promoted to Ensign in 1823 and, upon his appointment as Second-Lieutenant in 1828, he was transferred to the 59th Infantry Regiment. Urban was attached to this unit for sixteen years until his promotion to Major in 1844, when he was assigned to the 13th Border Infantry Regiment.

From 1828 to 1835 Karl von Urban was the Adjutant to the Military Commander in Moravia and Silesia, Field Marshal-Lieutenant Baron von Eckhardt. He then took up the position of head and instructor at the Regimental Cadet School, where he shared many new ideas of reform of the army and war of movement with Joseph Radetzky.

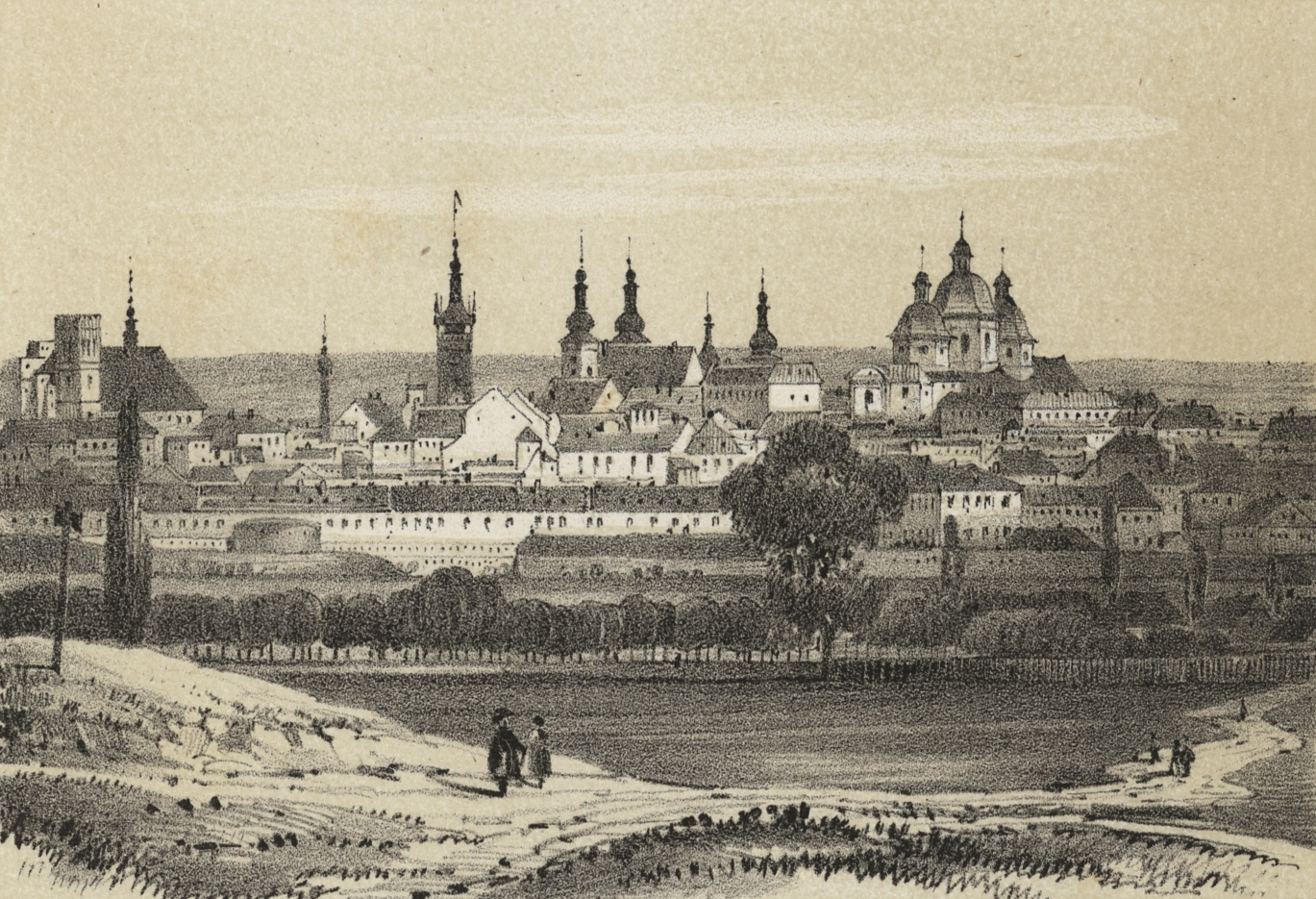
Panorama of Olmütz in the 19th century, where Karl von Urban received his military education

He headed the military survey and recruitment mission of the Inn Valley in Tyrol in the years 1837—1839 and, from 1843, Urban served as assistant to the General-Command Adjutant of the province of Banat. In 1845 he was named the General-Command Adjutant of the Military Government in the same province, a position he held for two years.

In 1847, Urban was promoted to Lieutenant-Colonel and was soon transferred to the 2nd Romanian Border Regiment in the Transylvanian Military Frontier. It was in this position that he found himself caught up by the Revolutionary storm that soon spread to Hungary and across the Austrian Empire during the fateful month of March 1848.

== Revolutionary War of 1848-1849 ==
A staunch defender of the Habsburg monarchy and of the ethnic minorities oppressed by the revolutionary movement, Karl von Urban was the first military commander to make a stand against the Revolution in Hungary. Despite being a modest Lieutenant-Colonel at the time, his leadership galvanized the Austrian Imperial and Royal Army and the population of Transylvania on the side of the Emperor and led to the defeat of the Revolutionary movement in the region.

Once the hostilities commenced, Von Urban proved to be an audacious and enterprising field commander, taking active part in intense confrontations and winning several victories on the battlefield. By opening a second front on the rearguard of the Revolutionary Forces, Urban contributed to the defeat of the Revolution.

=== Leader of the resistance against the Revolution ===
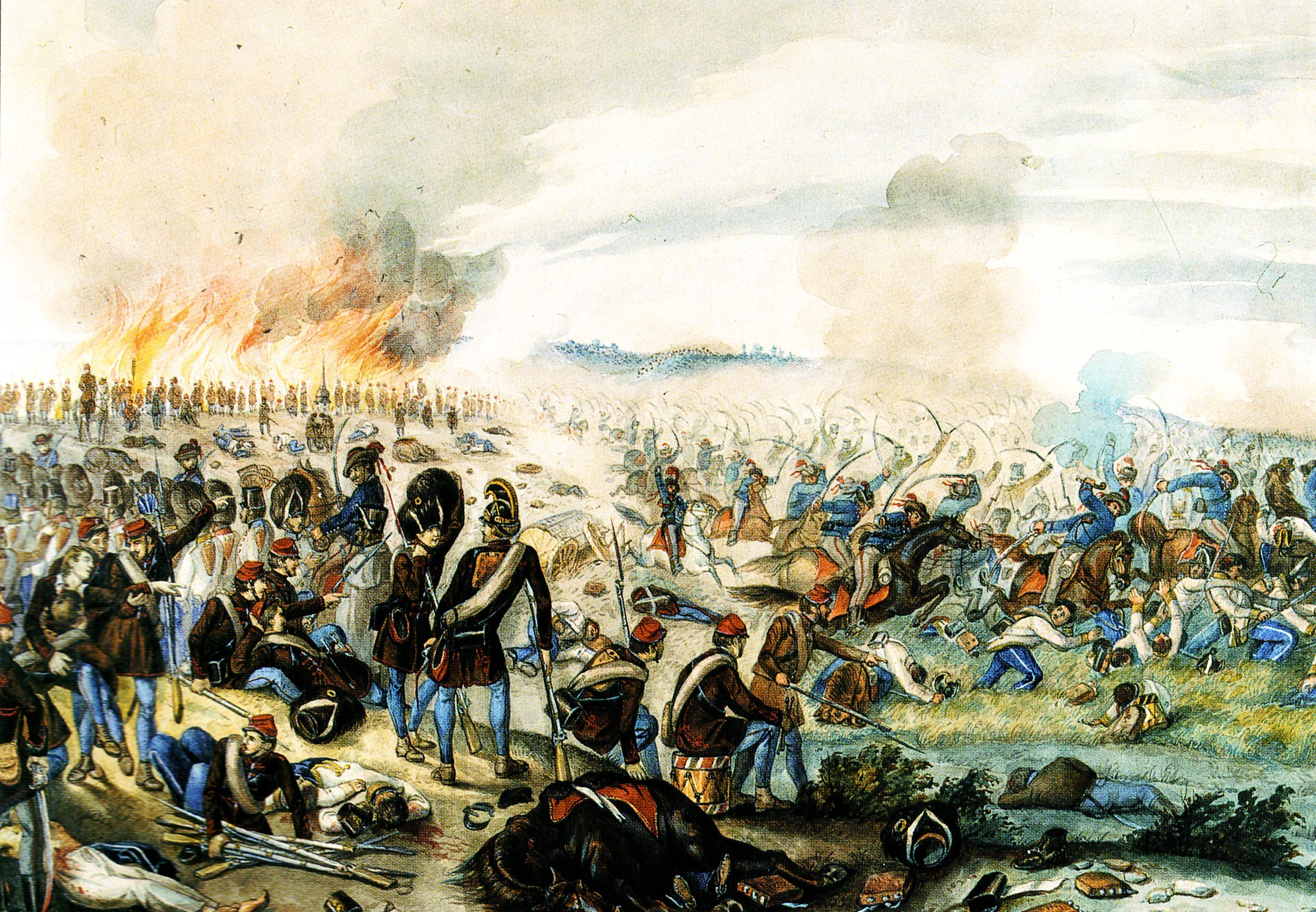
Scene of the Hungarian Revolution, characterized by intense fighting in several fronts, including in Transylvania.

Karl von Urban's leadership against the Revolution derived from his steadfast loyalty to the legitimate Habsburg rule in times of upheaval and increasing tensions in Transylvania and across the Austrian Empire. The changes brought by the Revolution sprung conflicts between ethnicities and institutions, which finally led to civil war. Urban's unwavering commitment to the Emperor, to the rights of minorities, specially Romanians, and to the Austrian Imperial and Royal Army led him to be in direct opposition to the Revolutionary Government.

Tensions started to brew in the Principality of Transylvania and across the Empire when the Hungarian Revolutionary Government passed the April Laws, which annexed the multi-ethnic Transylvania into Hungary. The Revolution further refused to grant equal rights to the Romanian and German minorities in the region.

The situation was exacerbated on 11 July 1848, when the parliament in Budapest enacted the law creating the Hungarian Revolutionary Army, the Honvédség, and implementing mass conscription. The conscription included men from all ethnicities, which aggravated the minorities, not consulted in the process. Furthermore, the minorities were exasperated by the summary executions and massacres of Romanians by Revolutionary units and tribunals on the orders of the government in Pest, mostly for refusing forced conscription.

The July Law also incorporated several units of the Austrian Imperial and Royal army into the Honvédség and ordered them to implement both the conscription and the punishments on the population. Every military personnel was also obliged to make an oath of allegiance to the April Laws.

Besides, the Revolution established a competing and separate armed force, the National Guard. Despite the condemnation by the Imperial Government, the Revolutionary authorities accelerated the recruitment of ethnic Hungarians to this force and to militia units, which set the ground for a civil and ethnic conflagration in the Empire.

In this context of increasing tensions, Karl von Urban came to understand that the Revolution was ill-intended and in opposition to the well being of the Empire, despite discourses on the contrary, and decided to take the initiative at great personal risk and to his career. In fact, Baron Anton von Puchner, the highest Austrian military authority in Transylvania, had sent a directive on 7 May ordering his subordinates to swear allegiance to the April Laws.

Notwithstanding this opposition, Urban spent the Summer of 1848 in intense activity to restrain the Revolutionary influence among the army and the population by dispatching envoys to villages, communicating with other officials and gathering intelligence. When Puchner established a peremptory deadline to all officers to swear allegiance to the April Laws - threatening with dismissal any officer who refused doing so - and ordering the army to implement the mass conscription to the Honvédség, Urban took interim command of his regiment from the debilitated Colonel Jovic and became the first officer of the Imperial and Royal Army to refuse the pledge of allegiance to the April Laws, and thus to the Revolution.

Lieutenant-Colonel Urban made a first public defiance against the Revolution with a speech directed to his troops, during the mobilization of the first battalion of his regiment. Urban addressed the soldiers in Romanian, their native language, exhorting them to remain faithful to the Imperial House and to their original oath to the Emperor, and urging them to refuse to swear the mandatory allegiance to the April Laws.

==== The Assembly of September 10 at Naszód ====
Ethnic conflicts intrinsically marked the Revolutionary War in the Austrian Empire and particularly in Transylvania (right on the map - in orange: Romanians / in dark green: Hungarians (Szeklers) / in red: Germans (Transylvanian Saxons)

Von Urban proceeded by summoning leaders of all 44 regimental districts to his headquarters in Naszód (Năsăud) for a General Assembly on 10 September 1848. The villages and cities responded enthusiastically: backed by the local leaderships and with the travel expenses afforded by the communities' collective support, hundreds of delegates were sent to attend the Assembly and apply for the Pajura (eagle in Romanian), a certificate declaring that a village was loyal to the Habsburg Emperor and willing to mobilize and fight for him.

At the Assembly, Karl von Urban demonstrated sensibility to the legitimate concerns of diverse social groups, offering protection to villages and peasants that rejected forced conscription and to landowners who feared a peasant uprising. He then administered the oath of allegiance to the hundreds of peasants and village delegates.

==== The Memorandum of 14 September ====
Soon after, Karl von Urban denounced the Revolution in a Memorandum widely distributed. In the manifest Urban boldly stated that it was his duty to declare the Revolutionary government and its ministries as illegitimate and, thus, the concessions forced from the Emperor and the secession of Hungary from the monarchy as invalid; the annexation of Transylvania to Hungary was void, since the minorities such as the Romanians were not consulted; and Transylvanias were not obliged to be enlisted in the Revolutionary Army, given the lack of legality of the law passed by the Hungarian Parliament, which was not sanctioned by the Emperor. Urban further declared that his actions aimed at saving the Austrian monarchy from destruction, and that he was bearing the Imperial Flag to fight the revolutionary forces who have taken up in arms.

Urban's impactful actions resulted in 918 communities in the region withdrawing their support from the Revolution and embracing the Imperial and Counter-revolutionary cause by the conclusion of September. This proved to be a fatal blow to the revolutionary party's power and influence, effectively thwarting the plans of the Revolution to conduct mass recruitment for the new Revolutionary Army in Transylvania.

The initiatives and measures taken by Karl von Urban also set an example for other officers of the army, who followed his lead and summoned their own assemblies in their military districts. In contrast, Puchner initial response to Urban's activities was the threat of strict investigation and even the use of military force to restore the order. The government in Budapest also pressurized Urban's superiors to act against him, however no real measure was undertaken and Von Urban remained unimpeded in his counter-revolutionary movement.

==== Strategic Commander ====
Without communication with the Headquarters in Vienna and operating without directives or logistic support, Urban initiated preparatives for the looming conflict. He readied his small force of Grenz Infantry for the herculean challenge of fighting the Revolution and organized the Romanian National Militia, a task made easier given his immense popularity among the Romanian population: thousands of men had flocked to Urban's headquarters in Naszód to offer their service and follow his leadership.

In the beginning of October 1848 the War Minister Count von Latour appointed Lieutenant-Colonel Urban the Strategic Commander for northern Transylvania in the event of conflict, with the instruction to "trust himself and his judgment". This honor was given despite the presence of six higher-ranking generals in the region.

Urban later moved with his troops to Sächsisch Regen (Reghin/Szászrégen), in order to attract the Revolutionary Army gathered at the revolutionary bastion of Maros-vásárhely (Târgu Mureș) and enable the troops in the southern part of Transylvania, under the command of Puchner, to concentrate and gather resources in preparation for the conflict.

=== Revolutionary War ===
The war against the Hungarian Revolutionary Government was officially declared after the assassination in Pest of Count von Lamberg, appointed by Vienna as military commander and palatine for Hungary, by a mob of revolutionaries on 28 October 1848. However, skirmishes between the revolutionary National Guard and the Austrian troops under Von Urban had already started since 22 October.

==== Battles of Voivodeni, Dés and Szamos-újvár ====
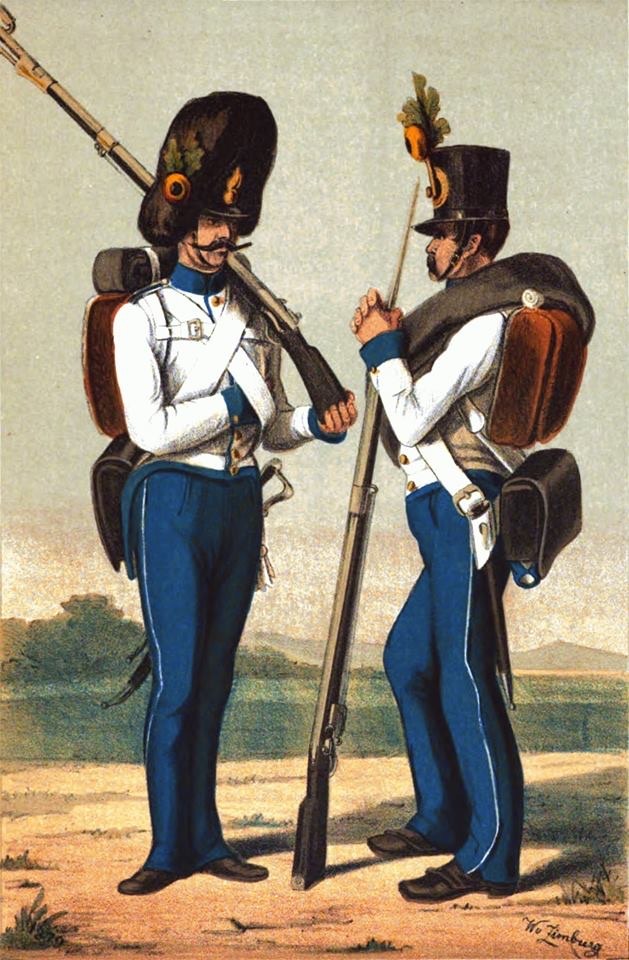
Austrian Infantry in the 1840s, by Wilhelm von Zimburg

Despite being vastly outnumbered, Von Urban was determined to fight. On 31 October 1848 he and his 1.500 men faced the Revolutionary National Guard led by Betzmann, numbered over 12.000 and formed mostly by Szeklers, in an intense reconnaissance battle at Voivodeni (Vajda-szent-ivány/Johannisdorf). In this first major encounter with the revolutionary army, Urban was forced to pull back to Wallendorf and wait for reinforcements.

With the joint forces of his Romanian Infantry Regiment and the reinforcement of the Wardener Brigade, Urban now could count with 3.000 men. Despite still being outnumbered, he considered himself ready to go on the offensive and started marching southwards in the direction of Klausenburg (Cluj-Napoca/Kolozsvár), the capital of the Principality of Transylvania.

Firstly he conquered Dés (Dej/Desch) after combat on November 10 and occupied Szamos-Ujvár (Gherla/Neuschloss) on November 11. Then Urban, departed from the Wardener Brigade and again standing alone with his regiment, attracted the Revolutionary Army stationed in Klausenburg with a surprise maneuver.

At the Battle of Szamos-Ujvár that followed on 13 November 1848, Karl von Urban engaged with his small force of 1.500 the 4.000-strong Hungarian Revolutionary Army led by Baron Manó Baldacci, the Hungarian commander-in-chief in Transylvania. Upon hearing the news of the incoming attack by the Honvédség, Urban placed his forces on the heights surrounding the city and received the enemy forces with salvos of canon and volleys of rifle. He decisively defeated the Revolutionary Army, which disbanded in a rout back to Klausenburg.

==== Battle of Szamosfalva and the capture of Klausenburg ====
With this success at Szamos-Ujvár, Lieutenant-Colonel Urban set off to capture Klausenburg. He reached the nearby village of Apahida (Bruckendorf) on 15 November, which he would use as bridgehead to launch the attack.

During the night Battle of Szamosfalva on 16 November, Urban's columns stormed the town of Szamosfalva (Someșeni/Mikelsdorf) through a narrow road while enduring heavy crossfire from well defended Hungarian positions, sent from the neighbouring Klausenburg to confront the Austrians. Facing a bayonet charge by the Hungarians, the Austrians lost momentum and began to retreat, however the Lieutenant-Colonel, employing his reserves, pressed on for a renewed attack, which was successful. Perceiving the situation as hopeless, the authorities of the city then sent a delegation and signed a formal agreement with Urban, surrendering the city at four o'clock on the morning of 17 November. Klausenburg was captured by Karl von Urban for the first time on 18 November 1848.

==== The Second Battle of Dés ====
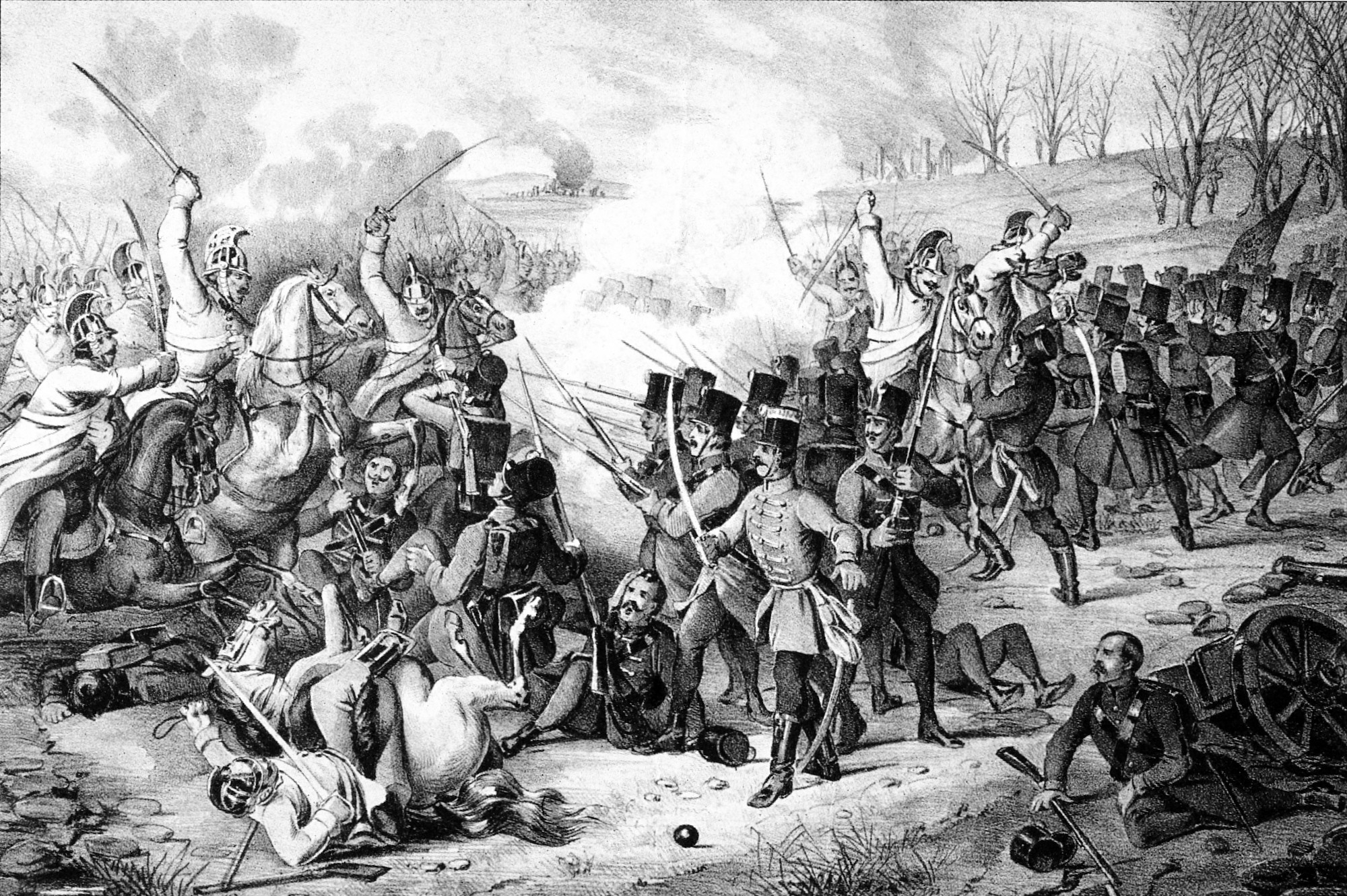
The second Battle of Dés, 24 November 1848 - Urban's cavalry played a pivotal role in the two flank attack that pierced the enemy's lines

Meanwhile, the revolutionaries under the command of Katona Miklós had recaptured Dés (Dej/Desch). In a war council in Klausenburg, Lieutenant-Colonel Urban offered to retake the city.

At the Battle of Dés on 24 November, Urban launched a storming attack on two flanks with his 2.300 infantry and 150 cavalry against an enemy force numbering between 10.000 and 14.000 men, armed with 16 cannons. During the engagement that lasted several hours, Urban's cavalry charged into the ranks of the insurgents, dismantling their formations. They fled the battle scene in a rout to the mountains, in the direction of Nagy-Bánya (Baia Mare). Urban pursued the enemy to this location, effectively expelling the revolutionary forces from Transylvania.

=== New orders from Vienna ===
Urban, promoted to the rank of Colonel on 1 December, was by now renowned across the Empire for his remarkable military feats. He had captured the entirety of northern Transylvania and defeated the enemy with a force at his disposal of only 1.500 to 3.000 men.

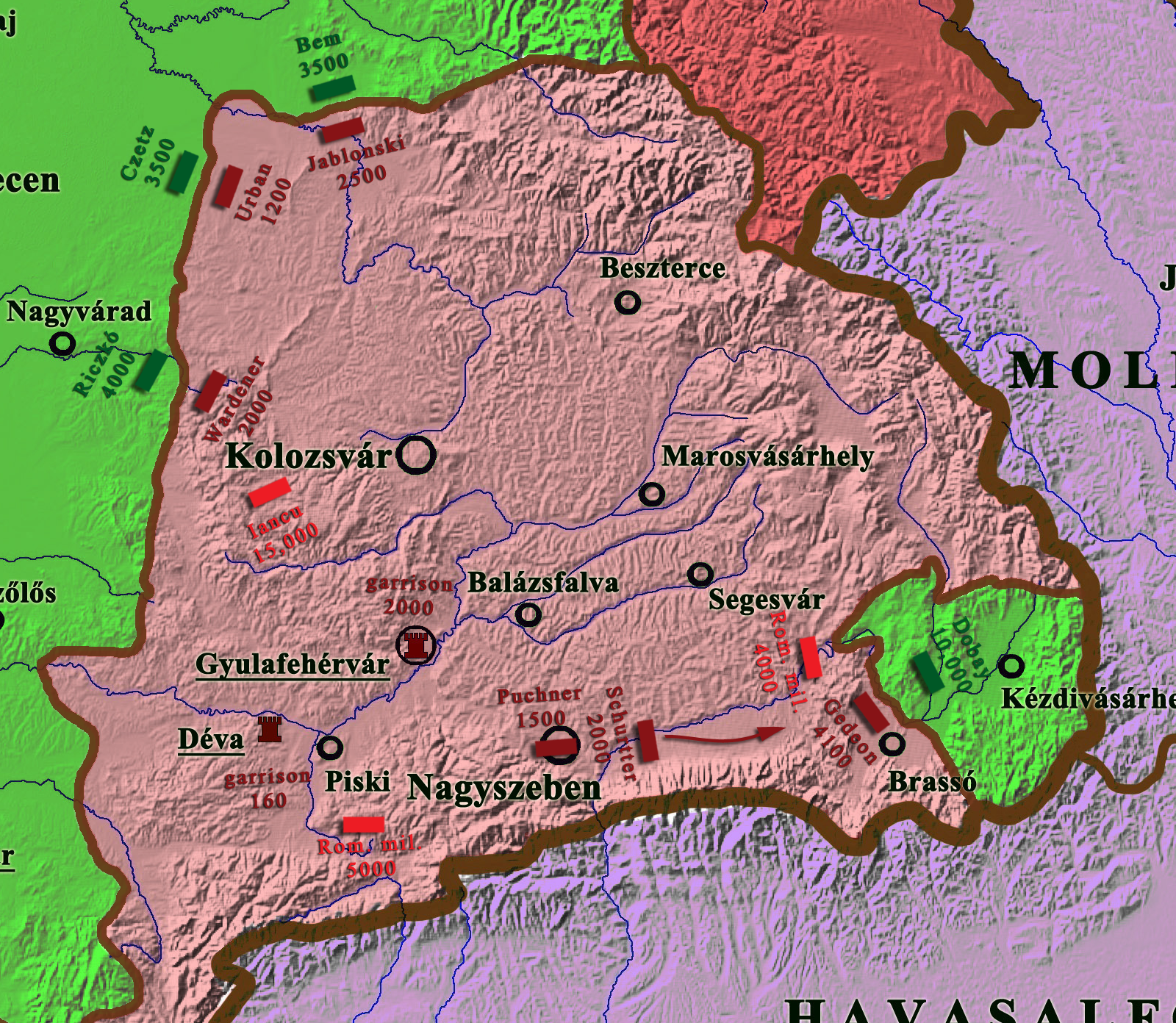
Military situation in Transylvania mid December 1848. Red: Austrian forces / Green: Revolutionary forces

In response to this triumph, the Imperial Commander-in-Chief Alfred I, Prince of Windisch-Grätz formulated a strategy to launch an attack on two fronts against the revolutionary forces entrenched in the heartland of Hungary. As part of this plan, Colonel Urban was ordered to cross the challenging Ciucea Pass (Csucsa/Tschetsch Pass) that traditionally served as divider between Transylvania and the expansive Great Hungarian Plains.

Coincidentally, at the same time the new leader of the revolutionary government Lajos Kossuth, recognizing the threat posed by Urban, decided to form a new army aimed at destroying Urban's forces and retaking Transylvania. Kossuth entrusted the new army to the Polish general József Bem, who promptly organized his heavily armed force of 12,150 infantry, 2,385 cavalry and 24 cannons in three columns. He then set to invade the Principality on 20 December.

==== Battle of Ciucea (Csucsa) Pass ====
This situation led to the Battle of the Ciucea Pass, where Urban's contingent, consisting of 1,200 men, faced the daunting task of forcing their way through a significantly larger Hungarian column led by the Colonel Károly Riczkó, which boasted 4,000 soldiers.

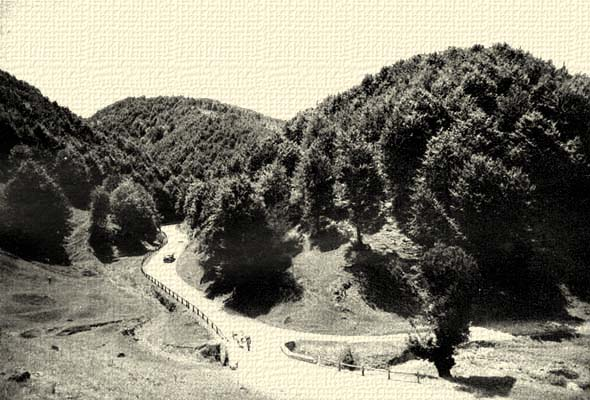
The Ciucea Pass, scene of intense battles between Urban and the Revolutionary Army

The battle, marked by its intensity and scale, spanned two consecutive days - 18 and 19 December. Despite a monumental and valiant effort, Urban's forces were unable to break through the formidable enemy lines in the narrow pass. Realizing the futility of continued combat under these circumstances, Urban made the decision to retreat to Nagy-Almás (Almașu Mare), then to Bánffy-Hunyad (Huedin) and Klausenburg. However, before withdrawing, he achieved a significant feat by capturing the treasury of the Hungarian army, marking a strategic victory despite the tactical retreat.

=== Invasion by József Bem and retreat to Bukovina ===
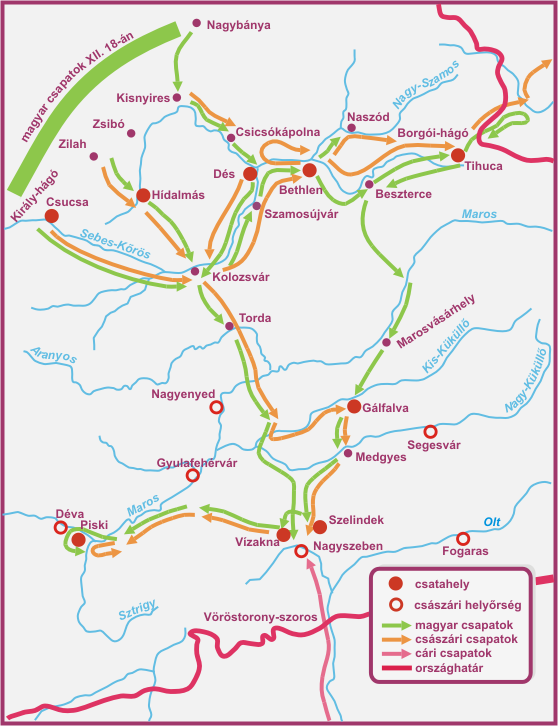
General Bem's invasion of Transylvania and his campaign from 19 December 1848 to 9 February 1849. (Green: Revolutionaries / Orange: Imperials / Red: Russians)

Urban now faced the threat of encirclement and destruction by Bem's three army columns that advanced rapidly in his direction. He managed to deceive this fate by employing audacious flanking maneuvers and breaking through the enemy's encirclement at Apahida, then retreating north-eastwards in a 30 hours forced march towards the province of Bukovina. Klausenburg fell by Christmas day.

During the retreat to Bukovina, Von Urban fought an exhilarating series of consecutive defensive battles: at Bethlen (Beclean) on 29 December, at Szeretfalva (Sărățel) on 1 January 1849, at Bistritz (Bistrița) on 2 January, at the Borgo Pass (Pasul Tihuța) on 4 January, and finally at Vátra-Dorna (Vatra Dornei) on 5 January.

Urban consistently defended himself against significant superiority in numbers and fire power. Avoiding encirclement and capture, he finally reached Bukovina successfully and received, as his new mission under the command of Field Marshal-Lieutenant Ignaz Malkowsky, the defense of this province from enemy invasion.

=== Return to the Battlefield ===
==== The raid on Marossény (Marosborgó) ====
Notwithstanding being denied reinforcements after repeated requests to Malkowsky, Karl von Urban challenged explicit orders to the contrary and decided to launch an audacious surprise attack on the revolutionary forces, in order to boost the morale of his troops and in preparation for a larger offensive. The revolutionary outpost in Marossény (Marosborgó / Mureșenii Bârgăului), deep inside enemy's territory in Transylvania, was chosen as target for the dangerous mission.

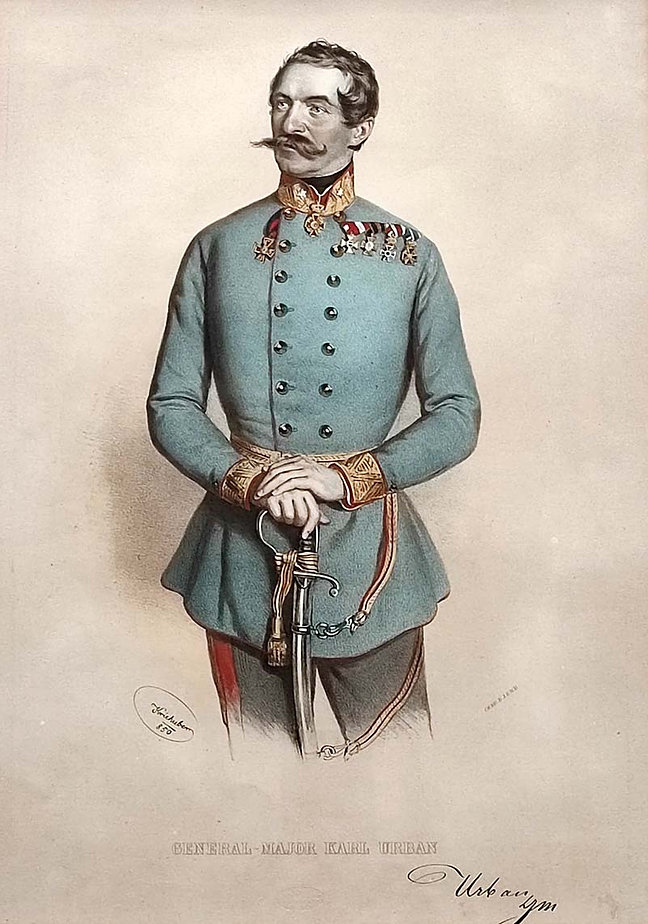
Karl von Urban, 1850 - by Kriehuber.

On 4 February, Colonel Urban assembled a force of 900 men, most of them volunteers, in Poiana Stampei (Pojana-Stampi) and at 7 o'clock on the morning of 5 February, Urban departed from Bukovina leading his men to cross the Carpathian Mountains. The journey was a challenging endeavor, with the troops crossing through deep snow covered unmarked paths, steep mountain terrain and virgin forests, amidst temperatures as low as 24 Celsius below freezing. After a grueling 20-hour day and night march, Urban reached the road between Borgótiha and Marossény on the morning of 6 February.

Approaching Marossény, the Austrians managed to take successive sentries by surprise and disarm them. Colonel Urban, leading at the front, directed the attack in complete silence, encircling the Revolutionary forces under the command of Captain Kofler. Within 15 minutes of entering the village, the mission was accomplished; the surprise attack succeeded without noise or a single shot being fired.

Without any losses, the Austrian force captured the outpost commander, 11 officers, 3 infantry battalions, 44 hussars, two cannons and 74 horses with all the enemy's baggage, ammunition and weapons. Following the successful completion of his mission, Urban returned to Poiana Stampei on the same day.

For this heroic act, Urban was awarded the Knight's Cross of the Military Order of Maria Theresa, Austria's highest honour, at the 153rd promotion of the Order on 29 July 1849. Besides, he would also be distinguished in March 1849 with the Knight's Cross of the Austrian Imperial Order of Leopold with War Decoration for his outstanding feats of arms of the previous year.

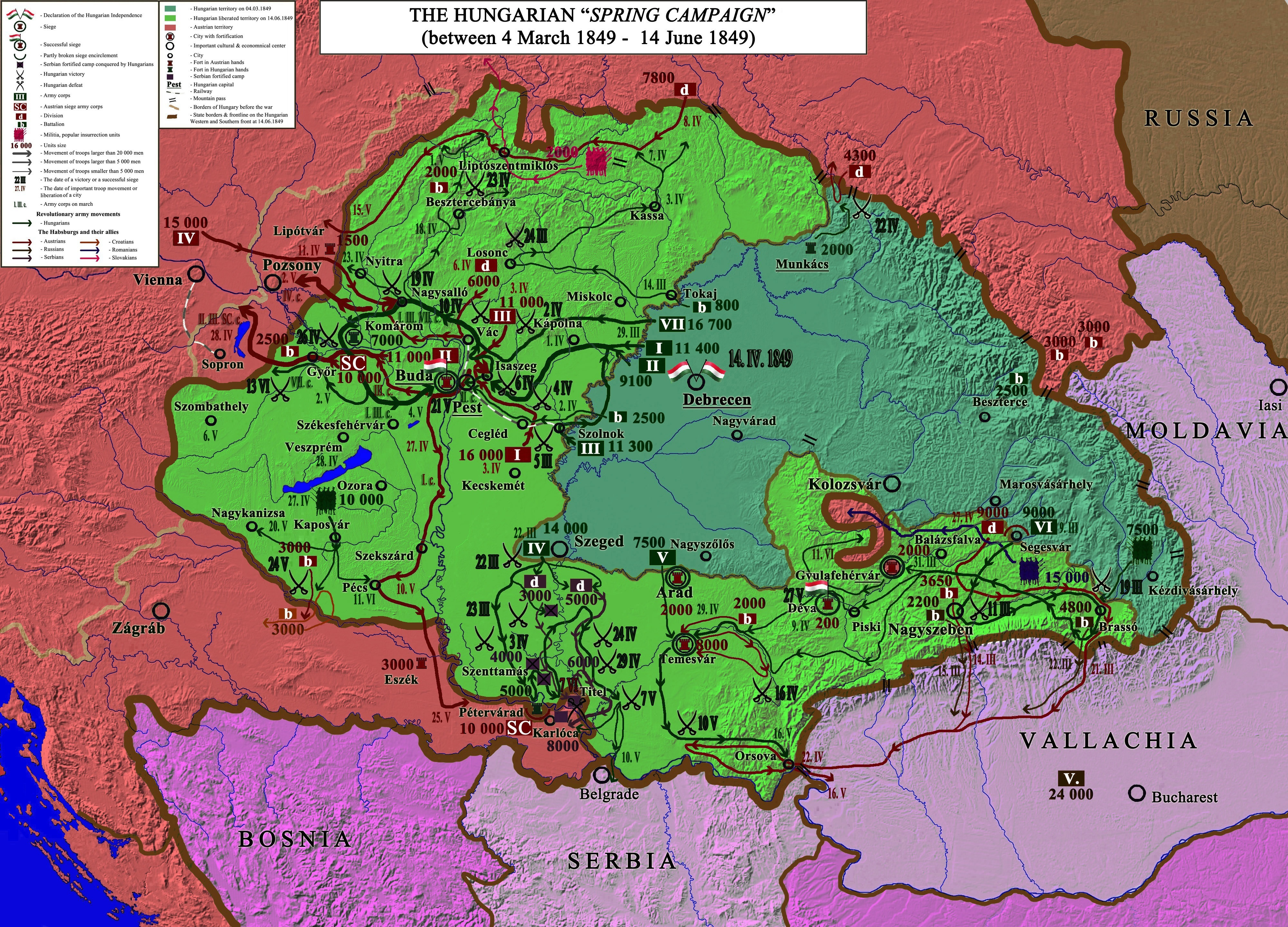
Military situation in Hungary and Transylvania in mid April 1849. Red: Austrians and Romanian forces / Green: Revolutionary forces

=== Summer Campaign of 1849 and the second capture of Klausenburg ===
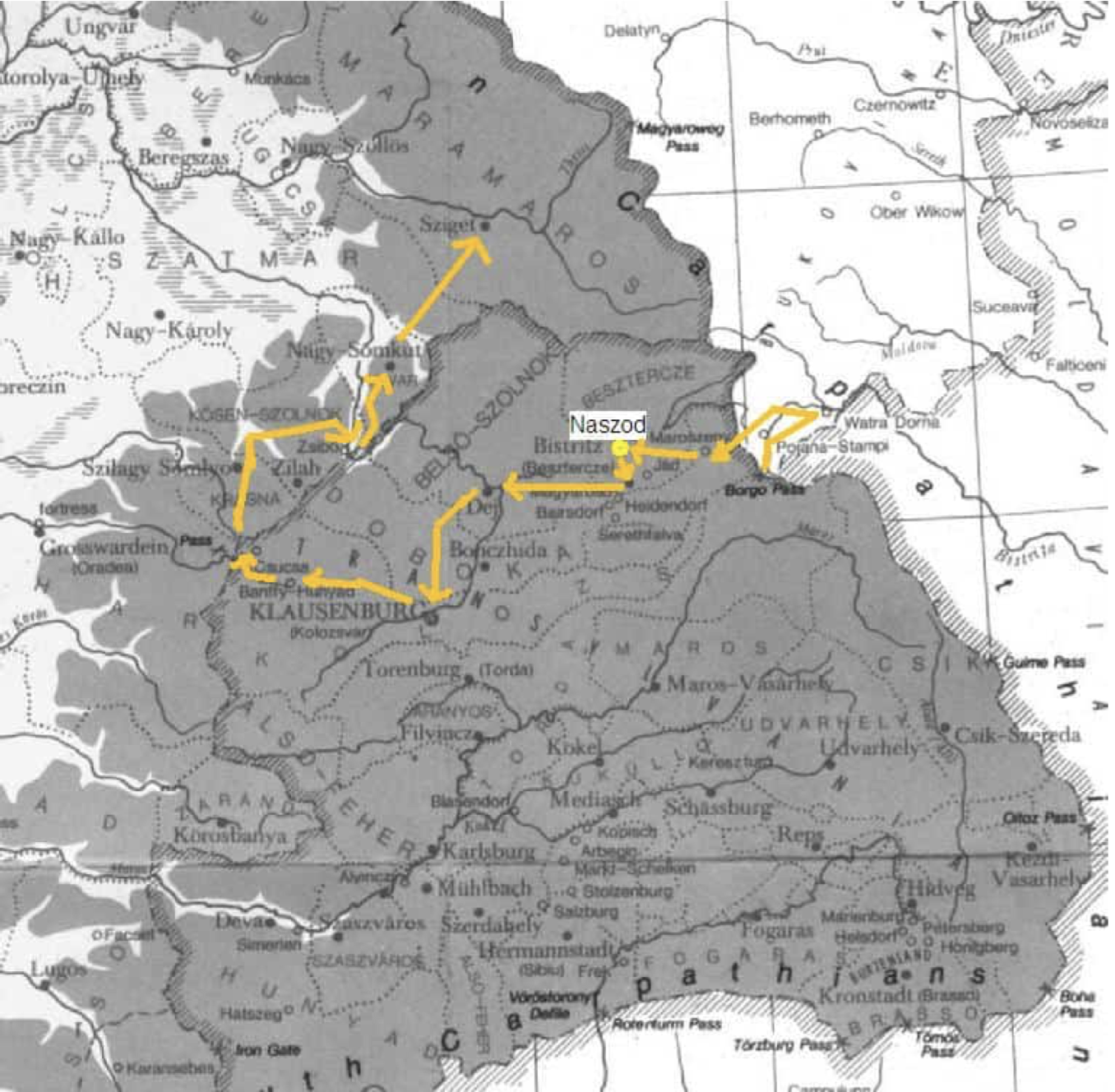
Karl von Urban's Summer Campaign of 1849

In the fledgling Summer Campaign of 1849 initiated in June, Russia aligned with Austria to defeat the Revolution in Hungary and Transylvania. In the scope of the offensive to reconquer Transylvania led by the Russian General Alexander von Lüders, Colonel Karl Urban assumed the pivotal role of vanguard commander alongside the Russian army corps of General Magnus Johann von Grotenhjelm.

In this role, Karl von Urban conquered Târgu Mureș (Maros-vásárhely) on 2 August and, on 15 August, he achieved the capture of Klausenburg for the second and final time. After this triumph, Urban launched on the following day a concerted offensive westwards, taking on the same day Gyalu (Gilău), Szárvásár (Izvoru Crișului) and Bánffy-Hunyad (Huedin), where he won a victory against enemy's forces.

==== Second battle of Ciucea Pass and the last days of the war ====
Urban then led his forces in an endeavor to traverse the Ciucea Pass (Csúcsa Pass) on 17 August. A the Second Battle of Ciucea Pass, Urban successfully defeated the Revolutionary Army after beating five successive defensive lines and crossed into the Great Hungarian Plain. The revolutionaries retreated to Hungary.

On 18 August, Urban advanced on Zsibó (Jibou), in Hungary, where he relentlessly pursued the 6,000 insurgents who had not yet surrendered in that vicinity. While swiftly pursuing the enemy, Urban also captured the cities of Nagy-Bánya (Baia Mare) and Sziget, preserving their treasuries from the threat of looting.

On the same time General Bem's Corps surrendered at Déva and the war was over. The core of the Revolutionary forces had already surrendered in Villagos on 13 August 1849.

== Interwar Period ==
=== Military Commander of Transylvania ===
Upon the conclusion of the campaign in Hungary, Urban served as the Military Commander in Transylvania for over a year, with his headquarters in Klausenburg, the city he had captured two times. He was promoted to Major-General in June 1850.

==== Protector of ethnic Hungarians ====
Von Urban distinguished himself as the Military Commander by vigorously protecting the Hungarian population and settlements, previously supporters of the Revolution, from the excesses of a Romanian peasant uprising that targeted them. In this role he saved Dés (Dej), Szamos-Ujvár (Gherla), and Klausenburg and other localities from the threat of destruction.

His commitment to reestablish the rule of law across the country and to protect Magyars against reprisals marked the beginning of the reconciliation between the Transylvanian Hungarians and the Empire. For these actions of valour and in recognition of his efforts to preserve their city and their rights, he was granted the Honorary Citizenship by the citizens of Klausenburg, which at the time was majoritarily ethnic Hungarian.

=== Further career progression ===
In November 1853, he was appointed the Adlatus (adjutant) to the Gendarmerie Commander of Austria and, in April 1854, Urban became brigadier of infantry, a position he held for three and half years.

Von Urban was promoted to the rank of Feldmarschall-leutnant (Field Marshal-Lieutenant) in September 1857, becoming a division commander in the 7th Army Corps.

== Second Italian War of Independence 1859 ==
During the Italian Campaign of 1859, Karl von Urban commanded the IX. Army Corps, an independent mobile division also known as Division Urban or Urban's Flying Corps, consisting of 11.500 men organized in three brigades (Rupprecht, Augustin and Schaffgotsche). Urban was responsible for the only Austrian victories in this war, and no less than four occasions the Austrian Garibaldi fought against the Italian Garibaldi.

Urban's initial mission was to guarantee the order in Veneto behind the frontlines. His division was ready to be deployed anywhere in the province within 24 hours.

=== Battle of Montebello ===
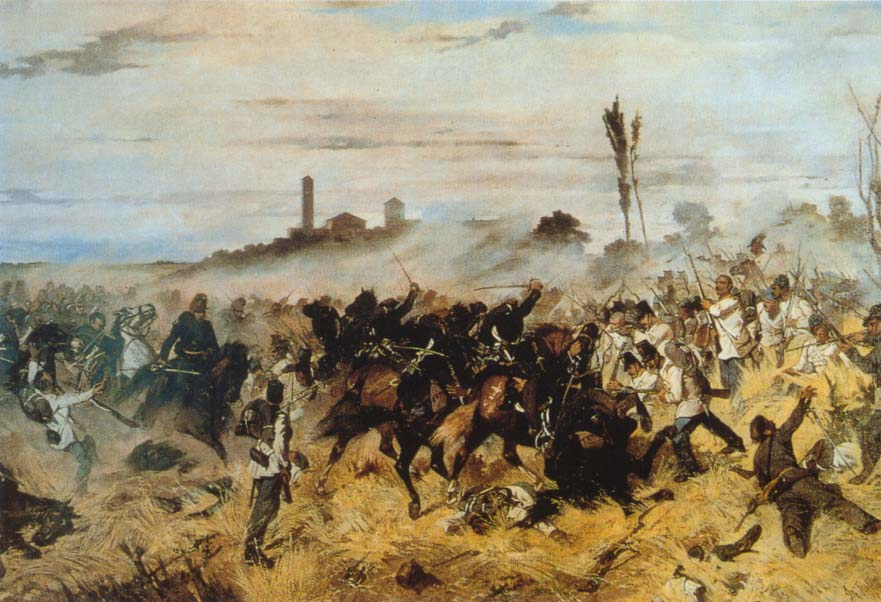
Battle of Montebello, by Giovanni Fattori

At the reconnaissance Battle of Montebello on May 20, the first in the conflict, Urban faced the French and Sardinian Armies. Despite being outnumbered in men and firepower, he managed to resist the enemy's assaults for nine hours, only retreating with the arrival of the Sardinian Cavalry.

For his bravery and great ability displayed during this battle, Karl von Urban was distinguished with the highest honor: the expression of the utmost satisfaction by the Emperor Franz Joseph, conveyed to him on 2 June.

=== Facing Garibaldi: the Battles of Varese, San Salvatore, San Fermo and Treponti ===
After Montebello, Urban was sent with his Flying Corps by Count Ferenc Gyulay, the Imperial Regent of Lombardy, to the city of Varese, which had been occupied by Giuseppe Garibaldi's Hunters of the Alps (Cacciatori delle Alpi) on 23 May. Urban's task was to check Garibaldi's advance, which threatened the Austrian right flank.

==== Battle of Varese ====
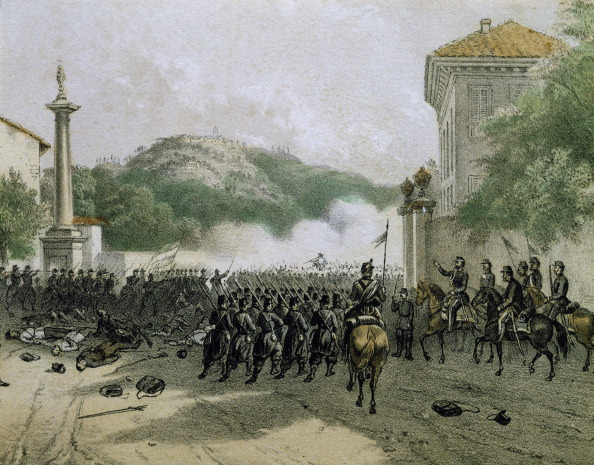
Battle of Varese

Before proceeding to Varese, Urban divided the brigade Rupprecht at the city of Como. One column was dispatched northward while another under his command approached Varese from the south. The envisaged tactical objective was to encircle and launch a coordinated attack upon the Hunters of the Alps from two directions.

In the early hours of 26 May he arrived in the vicinity of Varese. However, the northern force failed to arrive timely and Urban was compelled to attack 3.000 Alpine Hunters - further reinforced by the Civil Guard - with a comparatively modest column of mere 2.000 men. (Note: Both sides exaggerated the adversary's numbers, which was subscribed in certain bibliographies.) After three days of preparations, Garibaldi's force was by this time well entrenched in two robust defensive lines. At the ensuing Battle of Varese, the Austrian's initial attack was repulsed and Urban realized that he was facing a well defended and numerically superior enemy. After two hours and a half of combat, the Austrians initiated a retreat.

==== Battle of San Salvatore ====
The Hunter of the Alps, motivated by the initial victory at Varese, started a relentless pursuit of the retreating Austrian contingent. To confront the impending assault, Von Urban deployed his units in a formidable barrier across a deep gorge sided by hills on the right and left flanks, at the elevated San Salvatore hights between Malnate and Binago.

The resultant engagement was a victory for Urban, whose objective was to delay Garibaldi so his main forces could proceed in the retreat to Camerlata and Como. After successfully rebuffing a first infantry charge, the Austrians launched an impetuous counter attack, pushing the Italians back. Garibaldi sent a second change from the left, which albeit repelling the Austrians to some extent in that front, didn't achieve a breakthrough. After two hours of engagement the fire ceased, Garibaldi ordered a withdraw to Varese and Urban retook his orderly retreat to Como.

==== Battle of San Fermo ====
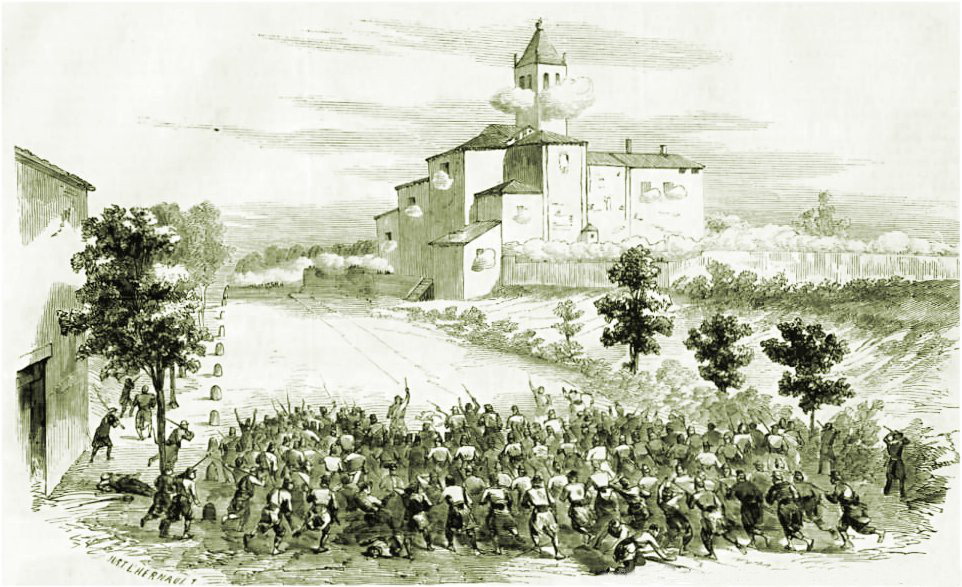
Battle of San Fermo - lithograph by Jules Gaildrau

In order to defend Como from the expected attack by the Hunters of the Alps, Urban concentrated most of his forces in Camerlata, a suburb of Como on the main road from Varese, and deployed two Hungarian battalions at the elevated pass of San Fermo, which overlooked the city.

On 27 May, however, Garibaldi attacked with the bulk of his forces through San Fermo, overrunning the Hungarian defenses. The Field Marshal ordered counter-attacks to regain the position, but the troops were unable to dislodge the enemy positioned on higher ground.

Von Urban then decided to leave Como and retreat to Monza, in order to assemble the entirety of his regiments. Great part of his forces were absent, thus unable to take part in the Battles of Varese and San Fermo. The regroupment of the Division would provide him numerical superiority.

==== Second advance on Varese and the order to disengage Garibaldi ====
After reuniting his three regiments Rupprecht, Augustin and Schaffgotsche at Milan, Urban marched again on Varese on 31 May with a force of 11.000 men, captured the city and encircled Garibaldi. However Garibaldi refused to give combat, preferring to escape to the security of mount Campo dei Fiori, from where he overlooked Urban and his troops amassed in Varese without interfering.

On 1 June, however, Von Urban was recalled by Gyulay and had to cease his pursuit of the Hunters of the Alps. After Gyulay's defeat at the Battle of Palestro the previous day, the advance of the Franco-Sardinian armies put Urban at risk of being cut off.

In the aftermath of the Battle of Magenta on 5 June, Von Urban's Division was positioned on the extreme right of the retreating Austrian Army, which was falling back to the defensive position of the River Mincio and the fortresses of the Quadrilatero. Urban eluded the threat to his flank by conducting a forced march and successfully reached the Mincio through arduous and bloody rear-guard actions.

=== Battle of Treponti (Castenedolo) ===
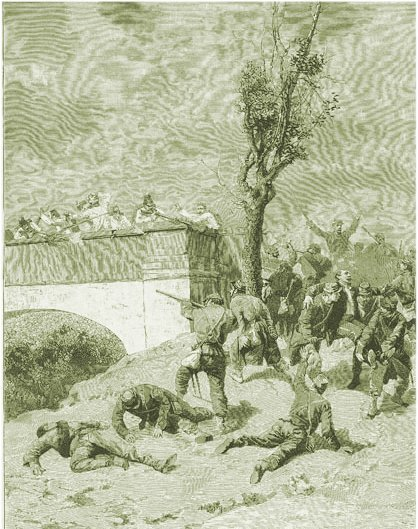
Battle of Treponti - lithograph by Edoardo Matania

The Battle of Treponti (also known as Battle of Castenedolo), on 15 June, was the fourth and final encounter between Karl von Urban and Giuseppe Garibaldi during the conflict. Urban employed a cunning stratagem that led to his victory over Garibaldi. At this juncture, Garibaldi was pursuing the retreating Austrian forces with a formidable contingent that had increased from 3.000 to around 12,000 volunteers. The Hunters of the Alps had been further reinforced by the Sardinian brigade Voghera.

Field Marshal Von Urban orchestrated a sequence of events designed to entice Garibaldi into a trap, with an attack on the Italian positions at Treponti (today in the commune of Rezzato), executed by elements of the Rupprecht Brigade. The Hunters of the Alps, eager to confront the challenge, took the bait and launched an assault en force against the Division Urban, strategically positioned in proximity to Castenedolo.

After having successfully breached the initial Austrian lines of defense, crossing two bridges over the Lupo canal, the Italian forces soon found themselves entrapped, surrounded from three directions, and subjected to relentless and withering enemy fire after crossing the third bridge. Von Urban had strategically positioned his central forces upon a plateau, in an impregnable fortified semi-circular formation. As the Italian forces discovered themselves entrapped within this intricate web, Von Urban executed a meticulously coordinated maneuver, ordering an attack in pincers by his right and left flanks.

Confronted by this relentless onslaught and entrapped within the tactical scheme, the Italian forces were compelled to retreat in a disorderly rout, retracing their steps in a desperate effort to regain their initial positions at the village of Treponti. Despite Garibaldi's energetic efforts to quell the rout and reorganize the remnants of his forces for a renewed offensive, his second attack met again with failure and he executed a retreat to Brescia.

=== Supreme commander of Verona ===
After the triumph of Treponti, Von Urban was appointed supreme commander over Verona, the Imperial Headquarters and main fortress of the Quadrilateral, the Austrian strategic defensive system in Italy. He kept this command until 13 July, after the war had ended.

== Peace and final years ==
Following the Battle of Solferino and the Peace of Villafranca, Field Marshal Karl von Urban was assigned commander of the 4th Army Corps in Brünn, Bohemia. He was then commissioned to the Military General-Command for Moravia and Silesia in February 1862, a post he held until his retirement on 1 May 1865.

On 1 January 1877, in the late morning hours, Karl von Urban requisitioned a carriage and directed the coachman to transport him to the garrison hospital. As the carriage was passing under the Obrowitz Bridge during the journey, a gunshot was discerned by the coachman, who, however, did not accord it significant attention. Upon arrival at the hospital and subsequent opening of the carriage, it was discovered that the 74-year-old field marshal had died. Speculations circulated that intense physical distress might have compelled Karl von Urban to end his own life.

== Honours ==
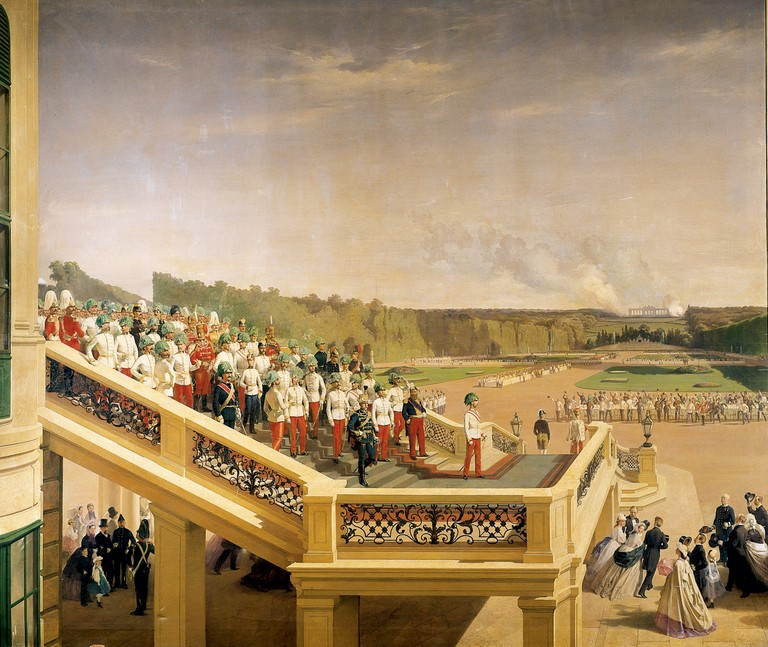
Emperor Franz Joseph on the garden steps at Schönbrunn Palace with knights of the Order of Maria Theresa on the occasion of the 100th anniversary of the Order. 1857

=== Austrian Empire ===
- Knight of the Military Order of Maria Theresa
- Knight of the Royal Hungarian Order of Saint Stephen
- Knight of the Austrian Imperial Order of Leopold with war decoration
- Officer's Service Badge 1st Class
- War Medal 1873

=== Kingdom of Bavaria ===
- Royal Merit Order of St. Michael

=== Russian Empire ===
- Knight Grand Cross of the Order of St. Stanislaus 1st Class
- Knight of the Imperial Order of Saint Prince Vladimir with Swords
- Knight of the Order of St. Anne with Crown and Swords
- Knight of the Imperial Order of Saint Alexander Nevsky

=== Other ===
- Honorary Citizenship of Klausenburg (Cluj-Napuca)
- The expression of the utmost satisfaction by the Emperor Franz Joseph

== See also ==
- Revolutions of 1848
- Ludwig Baron von Welden
- Category:Field marshals of Austria
- History of Transylvania
- Battle of Solferino
- Austrian Empire

== Bibliography ==
- Miskolczy, Ambrus (2002). Counter-revolution and Civil War. In: Transylvania in the Revolution and the War of Independence (1848-1849). In: History of Transylvania Vol. III. Institute of History of the Hungarian Academy of Science. ISBN 0-88033-497-5
- Seton-Watson, R. W. (1934). A History of the Roumanians: From Roman Times to the Completion of Unity. Cambridge: Cambridge University Press.
- Pallua-Gall, Julian (1895). Urban, Karl Freiherr von. In: Allgemeine Deutsche Biographie - ADB [Universal German Biography] (in German). Vol. 39. Leipzig: Duncker & Humblot.
- Trevelyan, George Macaulay (2022). Garibaldi and the Thousand (facsimile of 1st ed.). Frankfurt: Salzwasser Verlag GmbH. ISBN 978-3-375-09585-7
- Bánlaky Doberdoi, József (2001). The Military History of Hungary's Independence Struggle of 1848/49. In: The Military History of the Hungarian Nation (in Hungarian). Vol. 21. Budapest: Grill Karoly Konivkiadovallalata.
- von Wurzbach, Constantin (1884). Urban, Karl Freiherr. In: Biographisches Lexikon des Kaiserthums Oesterreich [Biographical Encyclopedia of the Austrian Empire] (in German). Vol. 49. Wien: Kaiserlich-königlichen Hof- und Staatsdruckerei.
- Gaiani, Emilio (1909). Garibaldi e i Cacciatori delle Alpi 1859-1909 [Garibaldi and the Hunters of the Alps 1859-1909] (in Italian). Città di Castello: Casa Tipografico-Editrice S. Lapi
- von Moltke, Helmuth (1862). La campagne d'Italie en 1859 [The Italian campaign of 1859] (in French). Paris: J. Dumaine.
- Lukeś, J. (1890). Militärischer Maria Theresien-Orden 1850-1890 [The Military Order of Maria Theresa] (in German). Wien: Kaiserlich-königlichen Hof- und Staatsdruckerei.
- Meyer, Herrmann Julius (1885–1892). Urban, Karl Freiherr von. In: Meyers Konversations-Lexikon (in German). Vol. 16. Hildburghausen: Verlag des Bibliographischen Instituts.
- von der Wengen, Friedrich (1879). Geschichte des k.k. österreichischen 13. Dragoner-Regiments Prinz Eugen von Savoyen [History of the Austrian Imperial and Royal 13th Dragoon-Regiment Prince Eugen of Savoy] (in German). Brandeis an der Elbe: Selbstverlag des Regiments
- Hirtenfeld, Jaromir (1857). Der Militär-Maria-Theresien-Orden Und Seine Mitglieder. Nach Authentischen Quellen. Zur Ersten Säcularfeier 1857 [The Military Maria Theresa Order and Its Members. According to Authentic Sources. For the First Centennial Celebration 1857] (in German). Wien: Kaiserlich-königlichen Hof- und Staatsdruckerei.
- Blackett, Howard (1888). Life of Giuseppe Garibaldi. London: Walter Scott.
- Phillips, Walter Alison (1911). Laibach. In: Encyclopædia Britannica. Vol. 16 (11th ed.). Cambridge University Press.
- Redaelli, Alberto (1979). Le grandi battaglie della storia bresciana [The Great Battles of Brescia's History] (in Italian). Brescia: Edizioni Grafo. pp. 95–119. ISBN 978-88-7385-291-9
