= Battle of Treponti =

- Part of Second Italian War of Independence
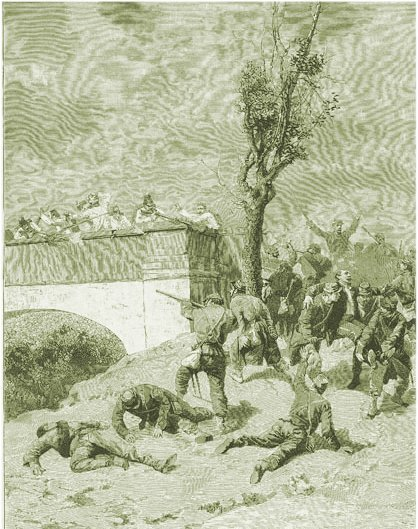
Date	15 June 1859
Location	Treponti, Rezzato, Lombardy
Result	Austrian victory

Belligerents
Austria	Sardinia

Commanders and leaders
Karl von Urban	Giuseppe Garibaldi

Units involved
Division Urban (IX. Army Corps)	Hunters of the Alps (Cacciatori delle Alpi)

Strength
4,000	3,500 approx.

Casualties and losses
109: 89 wounded, 12 killed, 8 missing	154: 117 wounded, 27 killed, 10 prisoners

The Battle of Treponti, also known as Battle of Castenedolo, took place on 15 June 1859, during the Second Italian War of Independence. The encounter opposed the Austrians led by Field Marshal Karl von Urban and the Sardinians commanded by Giuseppe Garibaldi. Von Urban employed a cunning stratagem that led to his victory over Garibaldi.

The Battle of Treponti was the only major Austrian victory of the war. It was also the fourth and final encounter between Karl von Urban and Giuseppe Garibaldi during the conflict.

== Prelude to battle ==
After the Battle of Magenta, the Austrian army started a retreat to the defensive position of the Quadrilatero. Karl von Urban was charged to defend the Austrian rear-guard from enemy's attacks.

At this juncture, Garibaldi was relentlessly pursuing the retreating Austrian forces, supported by Piedmontese troops of the brigade Voghera. The contingent of volunteers should have counted tens of thousands of troops (as promised to Garibaldi by Sardinian authorities) but the troops effectively available during the campaign amounted to c.3000-3,500 troops. Urban's forces in the battle amounted to c.4000 men.

== Battle ==
Urban orchestrated a sequence of events designed to entice Garibaldi into a trap, with an attack on the Italian positions at Treponti executed by elements of the Rupprecht Brigade. The Hunters of the Alps, eager to confront the challenge, took the bait and launched an assault en force against the Division Urban, strategically positioned in proximity to Castenedolo.

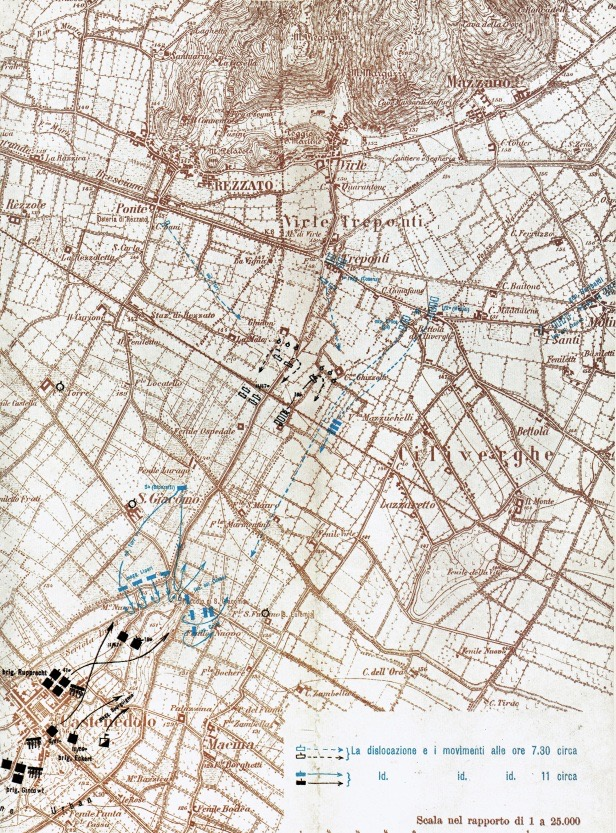
Battle of Treponti

Having successfully breached the initial Austrian lines of defense, the Italian forces soon found themselves entrapped, surrounded from three directions, and subjected to relentless and withering enemy fire. Von Urban had strategically positioned his central forces upon a plateau, in an impregnable fortified semi-circular formation. As the Italian forces discovered themselves entrapped within this intricate web, Von Urban executed a meticulously coordinated maneuver, ordering an attack in pincers by his right and left flanks.

Confronted by this relentless onslaught and entrapped within the tactical scheme, the Italian forces were compelled to retreat in a disorderly rout, retracing their steps in a desperate effort to regain their initial positions. Despite Garibaldi's energetic efforts to quell the rout and reorganize the remnants of his forces for a renewed offensive, his second attack met again with failure and he was forced to retreat to Brescia

== Aftermath ==
Karl von Urban was appointed the following day as supreme commander over the Fortress of Verona, the Imperial Headquarters. He had already been honored previously by the Emperor Franz Joseph for his performance in the Battle of Montebello.

On the next day Garibaldi received orders to redirect his forces to the north, effectively stopping his pursuit of the main Austrian army, which continued its retreat in an orderly way in the direction of the river Mincio and the Quadrilatero.

== Importance ==
Karl von Urban

The Battle of Treponti represents one of the only two victories by the Austrians during the Second Italian War of Independence, the other one being the Battle of San Salvatore. Both were won by Field Marshal-Lieutenant Karl von Urban.

After this defeat, Garibaldi and his Hunters of the Alps were diverted to an unimportant theater of the war, effectively removing the force of 12.000 men from joining the decisive Battle of Solferino.
