= Nino Bixio =

Italian general (1821–1873)

General Nino Bixio
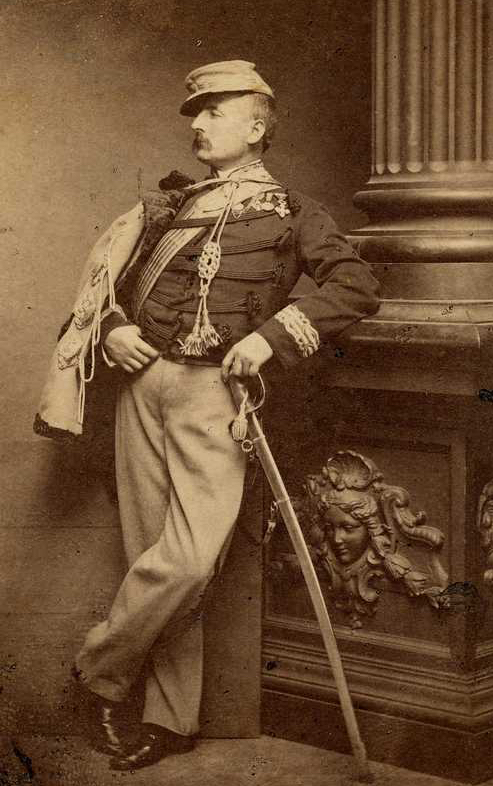
- Bixio, c. 1860

Senator of the Kingdom of Italy
- In office 6 February 1870 – 16 December 1873

Personal details
- Born: Gerolamo Bixio; 2 October 1821 Genoa, Kingdom of Sardinia
- Died: 16 December 1873 (aged 52) Banda Aceh, Aceh Sultanate
- Party: Independent

Military service
- Allegiance: Kingdom of Sardinia; Kingdom of Italy
- Branch/service: Royal Sardinian Army; Royal Italian Army
- Years of service: active: 1837–1870
- Rank: General
- Unit: Red Shirts
- Battles/wars: Italian Wars of Independence (1848–1866)

Gerolamo "Nino" Bixio (Italian: [dʒeˈrɔːlamo ˈniːno ˈbiksjo], Ligurian: [ˈniːnu ˈbiːʒu]; 2 October 1821 – 16 December 1873) was an Italian general, patriot and politician, one of the most prominent figures in the Italian unification.

== Life and career ==
He was born Gerolamo Bixio in Genoa. While still a boy, Bixio was compelled by his parents to embrace a career in the navy of the Kingdom of Sardinia. After numerous adventures in various places of the world, he returned to Italy in 1846, joining the Giovine Italia. On 4 November 1847, he made himself conspicuous at Genoa by seizing the bridle of Charles Albert's horse and crying, "Pass the Ticino, Sire, and we are all with you."

He fought through the campaign of 1848, became captain under Giuseppe Garibaldi at Rome in 1849, taking prisoners an entire French battalion, and gaining the gold medal for military valour. In 1859 he commanded a Hunters of the Alps battalion, fought in the Battle of Varese, and gained the Military Cross of Savoy.

One of the organizers of Garibaldi's 1860 Expedition of the Thousand against the Kingdom of the Two Sicilies, he turned the day in favor of the Thousand at the Battle of Calatafimi.

Meanwhile, the Sicilian peasants had hoped for – and did not get from Garibaldi – reforms from the restrictive conditions imposed by noble landowners. This hope had been reinforced by Garibaldi's decree of 2 June 1860 that land would be redistributed. At the little village of Bronte, Sicily in Catania province, a revolt took place, claimed by Garibaldi to have been led by local criminals and bandits, which caused the massacre of 16 people including peasants, officers, nobles (including two children) and a priest; during the revolt, the town theater and municipal archives were set on fire. On 4 August 1860, Garibaldi decided to send Bixio to suppress the revolt and punishing the responsible. Once he arrived with two battalions of Red Shirts, Bixio besieged and successfully secured the village. Unfortunately, most of those who had caused the revolt had already run away. Bixio organised a military court which found 150 locals guilty, and sentenced five of them to death. This episode reflected Bixio's bias about Sicily, bringing him to write to his wife: "In these regions it is not enough to kill the enemy, it is necessary to torment them, to burn them alive in a slow flame... they are regions that need to be destroyed or at least depopulated, their people sent to Africa to become civilized."

By August 21, Bixio and the Garibaldines entered in Reggio Calabria, in the Neapolitan mainland. He took part in the Battle of the Volturno, where his leg was broken.

Elected deputy in 1861, he endeavored to reconcile Cavour and Garibaldi. In 1866, at the head of the seventh division, he covered the Italian retreat from the Battle of Custoza, ignoring the Austrian summons to surrender. Appointed senator in February 1870, he was in the following September given command of a division during the movement against Rome, took Civitavecchia, and on 20 September 1870, he participated in the capture of Rome, which completed the unification of Italy.

On 16 December 1873, he died of cholera at Aceh Bay in Sumatra en route for Batavia (modern-day Jakarta), where he was slated to take command of a commercial expedition. The exact location of his grave remained unclear. Locals reported that he had been buried on the beach and his grave could not be seen at high tide. In 1876 during the Aceh War, a small military expedition of the Dutch East Indian forces set out to pinpoint the precise spot, but met with disaster as several soldiers were brutally slain in the attempt.

== Bibliography ==
- Staglieno, Marcello (1973). Nino Bixio. Milan: Rizzoli.
- "UIT ATJEH". Java-bode (Java Courier) (in Dutch). 27 April 1876.
