= Battle of San Fermo =

Battle during the Second Italian War of Independence (1859)

Coordinates: 45°48′37″N 9°02′46″E

- Part of the Second Italian War of Independence
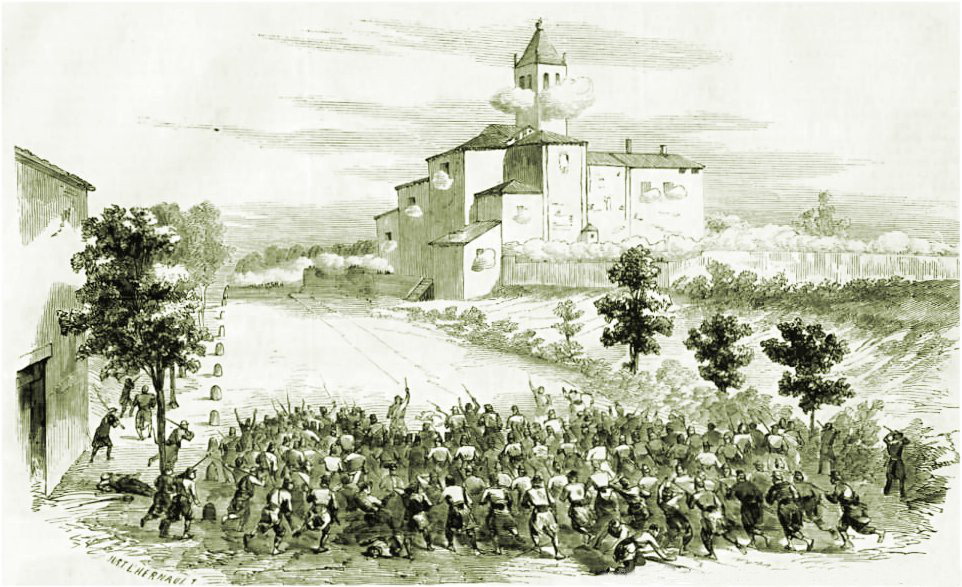
Date	27 May 1859
Location	San Fermo, near Como, Lombardy
Result	Sardinian victory

Belligerents
Sardinia	Austrian Empire

Commanders and leaders
Giuseppe Garibaldi; Carlo De Cristoforis †; Angelo Trezzini	Karl von Urban

Strength
3,000	6,400

Casualties and losses
14 killed 60 wounded	68 killed 264 wounded

The Battle of San Fermo, which took place the 27 May 1859 at a pass near Como in the northern part of Lombardy, was an engagement of the Second Italian War of Independence in which the Italian volunteers of Giuseppe Garibaldi's Hunters of the Alps defeated an Austrian force, forcing the Austrians to abandon Como.

== Battle ==
On 27 May through 28 May, Garibaldi moved from San Fermo and took Como.

On the morning of the 27 May 1859 Garibaldi left Varese and advanced towards Camerlata (nowadays a borough of Como). Through the use of a screening force at Olgiate (on the main road from Varese to Camerlata) Garibaldi was able to distract the attention of the Austrians as he led the main force of his army northwards in the direction of the mountains.

This force then turned east and approached the San Fermo pass. The Austrians were caught out of guard and the pass was only defended by the small force of Hungarians. The Hungarian troops took up defensive positions in the church of San Fermo and a nearby inn, from where they could command the valley approaches.

Garibaldi deciding to outflank the Hungarian position and so divided his army into three groups. One flanking party was sent out on each side, one to outflank the church and the other the inn. When the flanking forces attacked the third group, in the centre, launched a full frontal assault on the Hungarian positions in the church and the inn. This group was under the command of Captain Carlo De Cristoforis, who was one of the first Italians to be killed in the battle.

Despite a number of losses the Hungarian positions were quickly captured by the Italians. During the course of the Battle of San Fermo fourteen Italians were killed and sixty were wounded.

== Aftermath ==
General Urban now realised that the pass was in Italian hands, and sent reinforcements up the steep road from Como. Garibaldi's men held off the Austrian attacks, and eventually Urban's army fell back into Como. The Austrians still outnumbered Garibaldi's men, but the defeat on the San Fermo pass had badly affected Urban's morale. While Garibaldi decided if he should risk an attack on the strong Austrian forces he could see in Como, Urban decided to retreat. When Garibaldi's men reached the town after the slow descent from the pass they discovered that it was undefended.
