= Second Italian War of Independence =

1859 conflict between Sardinia (with France) and Austria

- Part of the unification of Italy and French–Habsburg rivalry
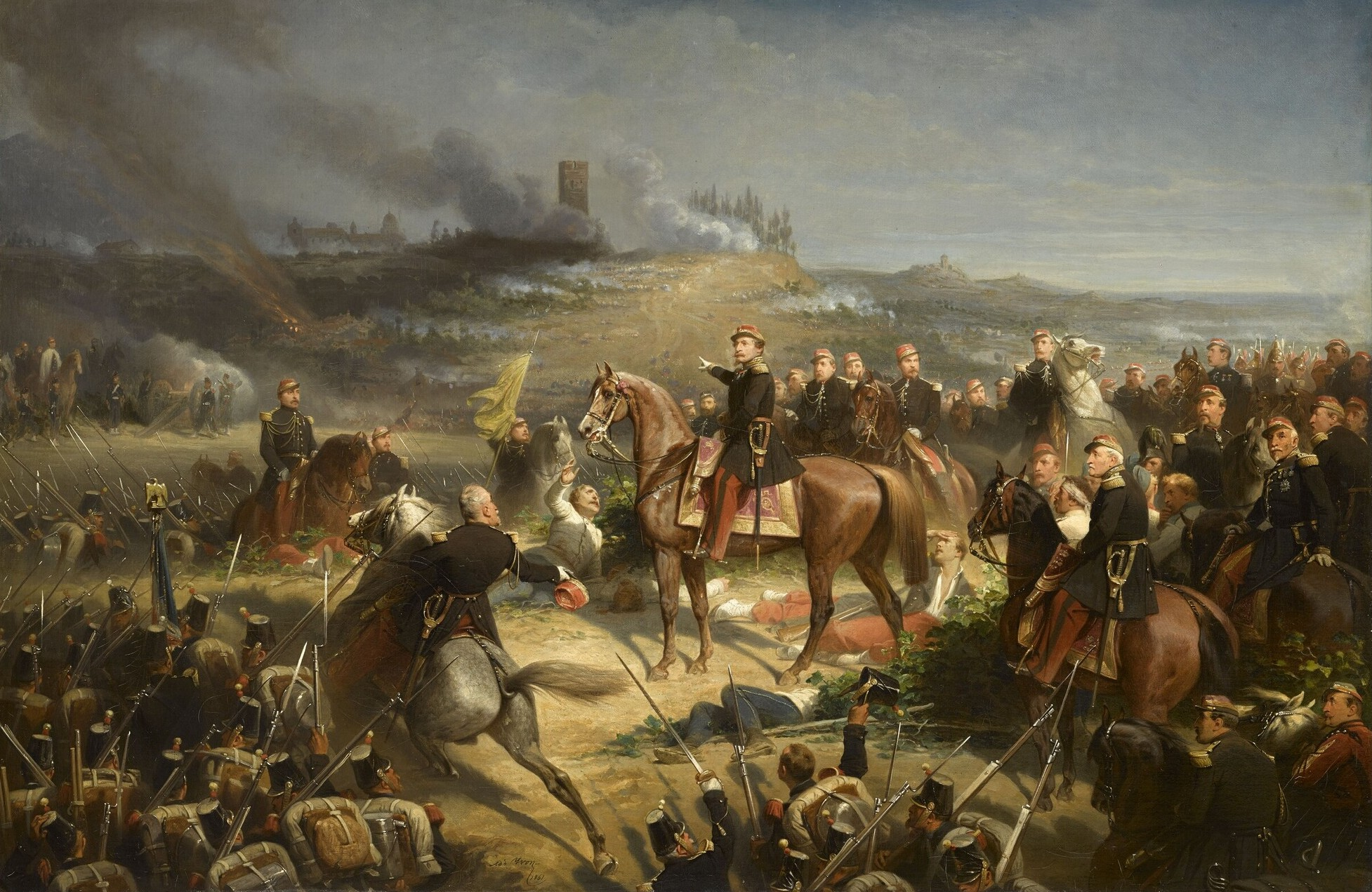
- The Battle of Solferino, the war's final battle
Date	26 April – 12 July 1859 (2 months, 2 weeks and 2 days)
Location	Lombardy–Venetia, Piedmont and the Austrian Littoral
Result	Franco-Sardinian victory: Armistice of Villafranca
Territorial changes	Sardinia annexes Lombardy from Austria, occupies and later annexes Habsburg-ruled Tuscany, Modena and Emilia, as well as Papal-ruled Romagna; France gains Savoy and Nice from Sardinia.

Belligerents
France; Sardinia	Austria

Commanders and leaders
(Second French Empire) Napoleon III (Second French Empire) P. de MacMahon; Victor Emmanuel II; Giuseppe Garibaldi; Alfonso La Marmora	(Austrian Empire) Franz Josef I (Austrian Empire) Ferenc Gyulay (Austrian Empire) Ferdinand Maximilian (Austrian Empire) Ludwig von Benedek (Austrian Empire) Karl von Urban

Strength
(Second French Empire) : 128,000; 312 guns : 56,000; 90 guns	(Austrian Empire) : 198,000; 824 guns

Casualties and losses
(Second French Empire) : c. 11,000 killed or died of wounds 1,128 missing 17,054 wounded 2,040 disease related deaths Total: 25,720 casualties : 1,533 killed 3,572 wounded 1,268 missing Total: Unknown	(Austrian Empire) : c. 23,000 killed or died of wounds Total: Unknown

The Second Italian War of Independence was fought by the Second French Empire and the Kingdom of Sardinia against the Austrian Empire in 1859 and played a crucial part in the process of Italian Unification.

A year prior to the war, in the Plombières Agreement, France agreed to support Sardinia's efforts to expel Austria from Italy in return for territorial compensation in the form of the Duchy of Savoy and the County of Nice. The two states signed a military alliance in January 1859. Sardinia mobilised its army on 9 March 1859, and Austria mobilized on 9 April. On 23 April, Austria delivered an ultimatum to Sardinia demanding its demobilization. Upon Sardinia's refusal, the war began on 26 April. Austria invaded Sardinia three days later, and France declared war on Austria on 3 May.

The Austrian invasion was stopped by the arrival of French troops in Piedmont that had begun in late April. The Austrians were defeated at the Battle of Magenta on 4 June and pushed back to Lombardy, where the Franco-Sardinian victory at the Battle of Solferino on 24 June resulted in the end of the war and the signing of the Armistice of Villafranca on 12 July.

Austria ceded Lombardy to France, which, in turn, gave it to Sardinia. Exploiting the collapse of Austrian power in Italy, Sardinia annexed the United Provinces of Central Italy, consisting of the Grand Duchy of Tuscany, the Duchy of Parma, the Duchy of Modena and Reggio and the Papal Legations, on 22 March 1860. Two days later, Sardinia ceded Savoy and Nice to France at the Treaty of Turin as compensation for its assistance.

== Background ==
The Piedmontese, following their defeat by Austria in the First Italian War of Independence, recognized their need for allies. That led Prime Minister Camillo Benso, Count of Cavour to attempt to establish relations with other European powers, partially through Piedmont's participation in the Crimean War. In the peace conference at Paris after the Crimean War, Cavour attempted to bring attention to efforts for Italian unification. He found Britain and France to be sympathetic but refusing to go against Austrian wishes, as any movement towards Italian independence would threaten Austria's territory of Lombardy–Venetia. Private talks between Napoleon III and Cavour after the conference identified Napoleon as the most likely candidate to aid Italy although he was still uncommitted.

On 14 January 1858, Felice Orsini, an Italian, led an attempt on Napoleon III's life. The assassination attempt brought widespread sympathy for the Italian unity and had a profound effect on Napoleon III himself, who now was determined to help Piedmont against Austria to defuse the wider revolutionary activities, which governments in Italy might later allow to happen. After a covert meeting at Plombières on 21 July 1858, Napoleon III and Cavour signed a secret treaty of alliance against Austria on 28 January 1859.

France would help Piedmont-Sardinia, if attacked, to fight against Austria if Piedmont-Sardinia gave Nice and Savoy to France in return. The secret alliance served both countries by helping with the Sardinian-Piedmontese plan of unification of the Italian Peninsula under the House of Savoy. It also weakened Austria, a fiery adversary of Napoleon III's French Second Empire.

Cavour, being unable to get French help unless the Austrians attacked first, provoked Vienna by a series of military maneuvers close to the border. Sardinia mobilised its army on 9 March 1859. Austria mobilised on 9 April 1859 and issued an ultimatum on 23 April demanding the complete demobilisation of the Sardinian Army. When it was not heeded, Austria started a war against Sardinia on 26 April.

The first French troops entered Piedmont on 25 April, and France declared war on Austria on 3 May.

== Opposing forces ==
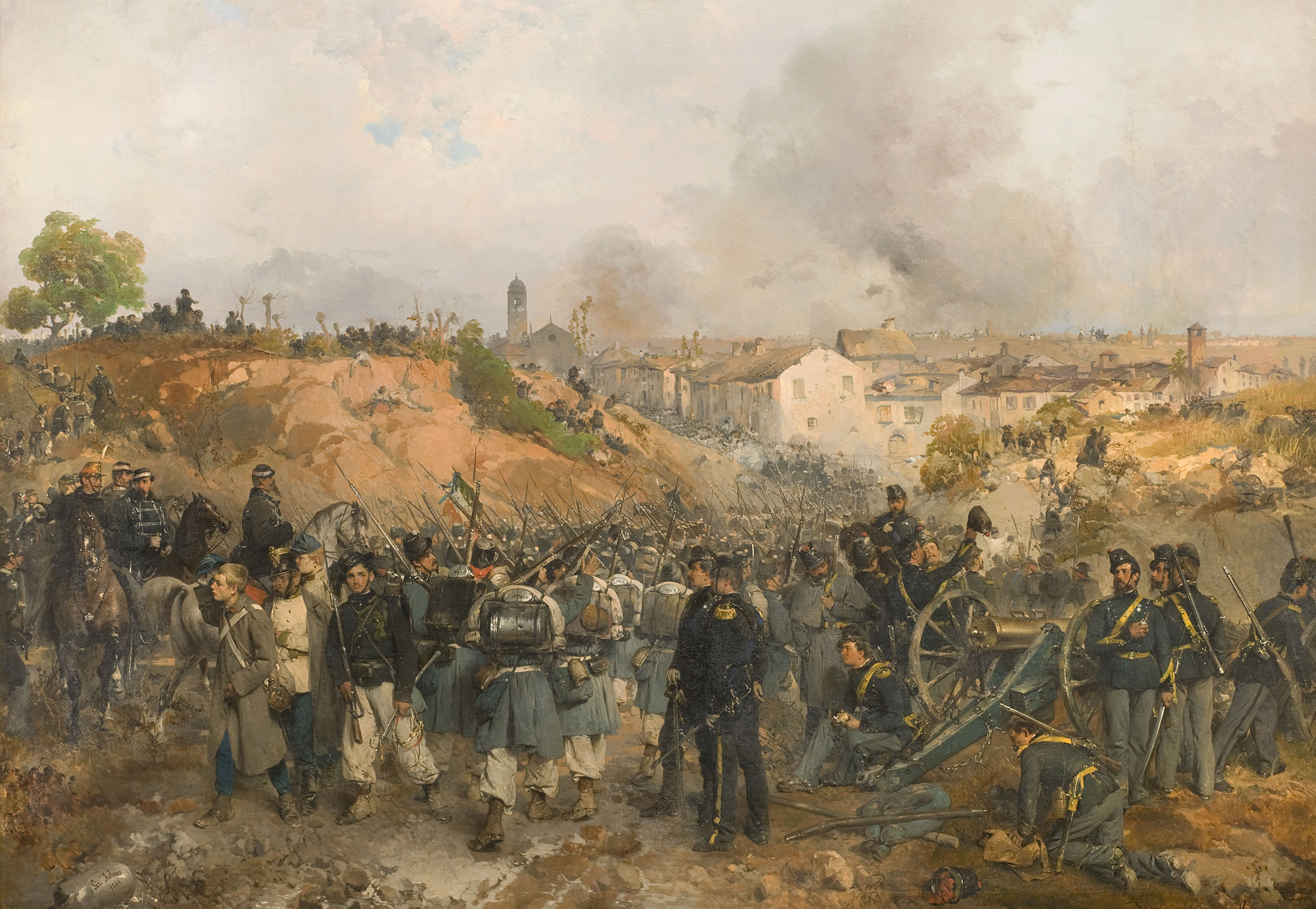
Sardinian troops at Palestro

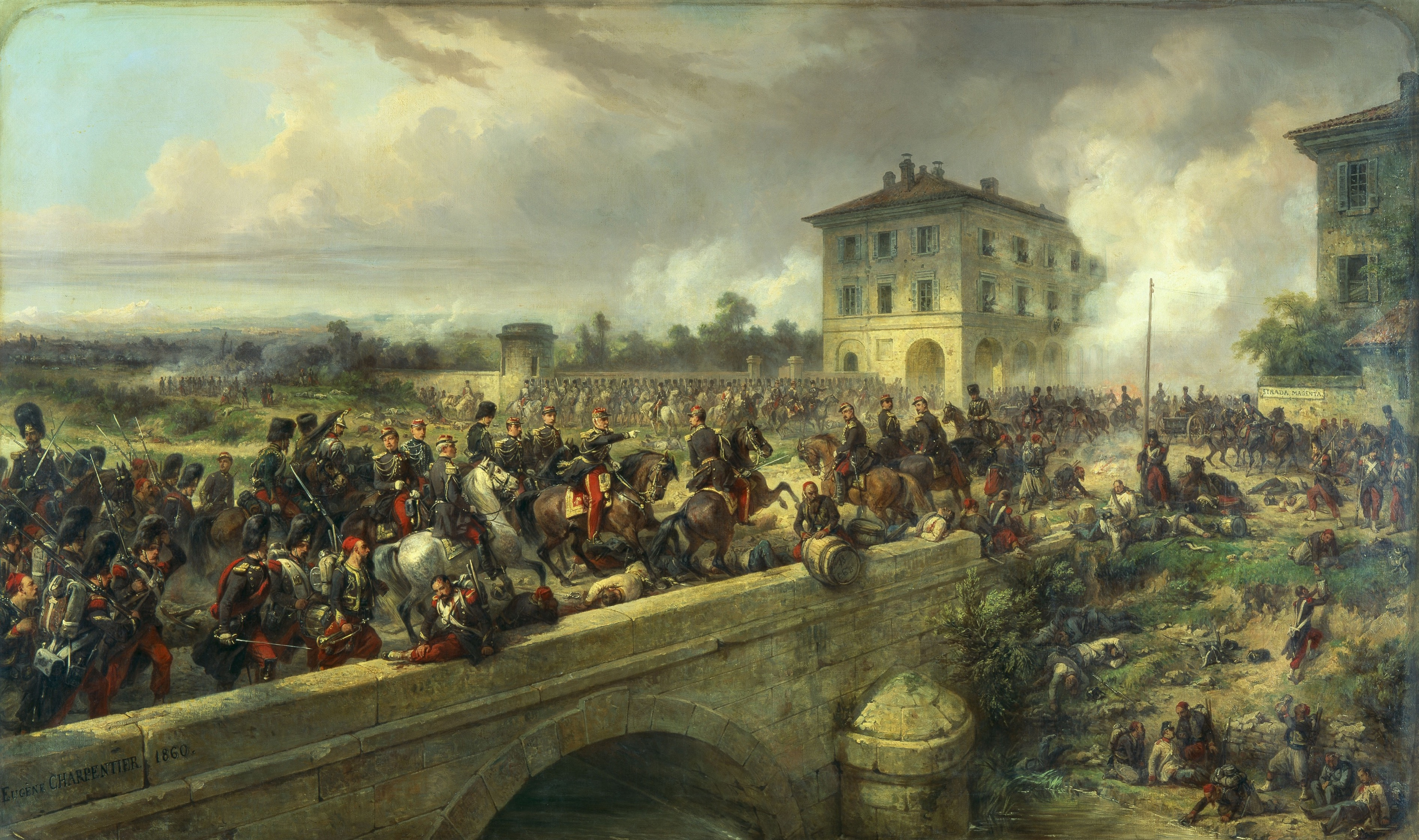
French Imperial Guard at Magenta

The French Army for the Italian campaign had 170,000 soldiers, 2,000 horsemen and 312 guns, half of the whole French army. The army, under the command of Napoleon III, divided into five corps: the I Corps, led by Achille Baraguey d'Hilliers; the II Corps, led by Patrice de MacMahon; the III Corps, led by François Certain de Canrobert, the IV Corps; led by Adolphe Niel, and the V Corps, led by prince Napoléon Joseph Charles Paul Bonaparte. The Imperial Guard was commanded by Auguste Regnaud de Saint-Jean d'Angély.

Napoleon III participated in the war and showed up on the battlefield in the belief that it would motivate the French people during the war. That would prove successful.

The Sardinian Army had about 70,000 soldiers, 4,000 horsemen and 90 guns. It was divided into five divisions, led by Castelbrugo, Manfredo Fanti, Giovanni Durando, Enrico Cialdini and Domenico Cucchiari. Two volunteer formations, the Cacciatori delle Alpi and the Cacciatori degli Appennini, were also present. It was led by Victor Emmanuel II of Savoy, supported by Alfonso Ferrero la Marmora.

The Austrian Army fielded more men with 220,000 soldiers, 824 guns and 22,000 horsemen. It was led by Field Marshal Ferenc Graf Gyulay.

While the Lorenz rifle proved to be superior over the French Minié rifles, the Austrian infantry did not receive proper training to take full advantage of their new rifles. Another problem for the Austrians was that most of its multi-ethnic army did not speak German, thus their soldiers were unable to follow the orders of their officers. According to Wawro, while the Austrian Army used nine different languages (including Czech, Serbo-Croatian, Hungarian, Romanian, and Italian) during peacetime, in battle only German was used. One Austrian officer recalled that his Slavic troops weren't even able to understand the command "Halt".

The newly-formed United Principalities of Moldavia and Wallachia also supported the Franco-Italian alliance. Their ruler, Alexandru Ioan Cuza, was given 10,000 rifles and ammunition by Napoleon III. Napoleon III, with his unwavering and very genuine sympathy, also sent a military mission to Bucharest. Encouraged, Cuza formed a new military camp at Ploiești. As a result, Austria had to keep 30,000 troops in Transylvania, which could ill be spared from Italy.

== War ==
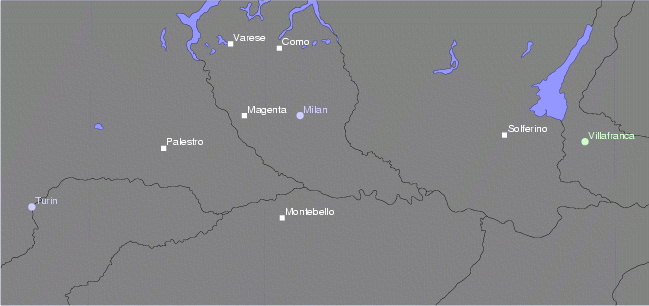
Major sites of the Austro-Sardinian War 1859

The French Army, under Marshal François Certain Canrobert, moved into Piedmont in the first massive military use of railways. The Austrian forces counted on a swift victory over the weaker Sardinian Army before French forces could arrive in Piedmont. However, Count Gyulai, the commander of the Austrian troops in Lombardy, was very cautious and marched around the river Ticino in no specific direction until he crossed it to begin the offensive. Unfortunately for him, very heavy rains began to fall, which allowed the Piedmontese to flood the rice fields in front of his advance and slowed his army's march to a crawl.

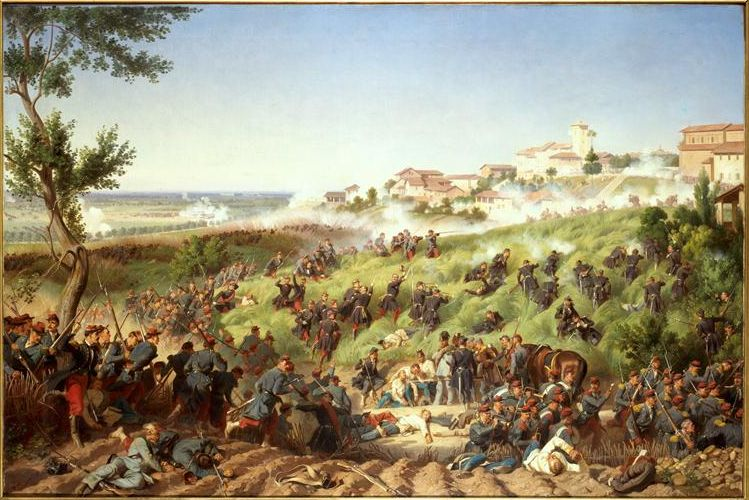
Battle of Montebello

The Austrians, under Gyulai, captured Novara on 30 April and Vercelli on 2 May and advanced on Turin from 7 May onward. The Franco-Sardinian move to strengthen the Alessandria and Po bridges around Casale Monferrato forced the Austrians to halt their advance on 9 May and to fall back on 10 May. Napoleon III left Paris on 10 May, landed at Genoa on 12 May and arrived in Alessandria on 14 May.

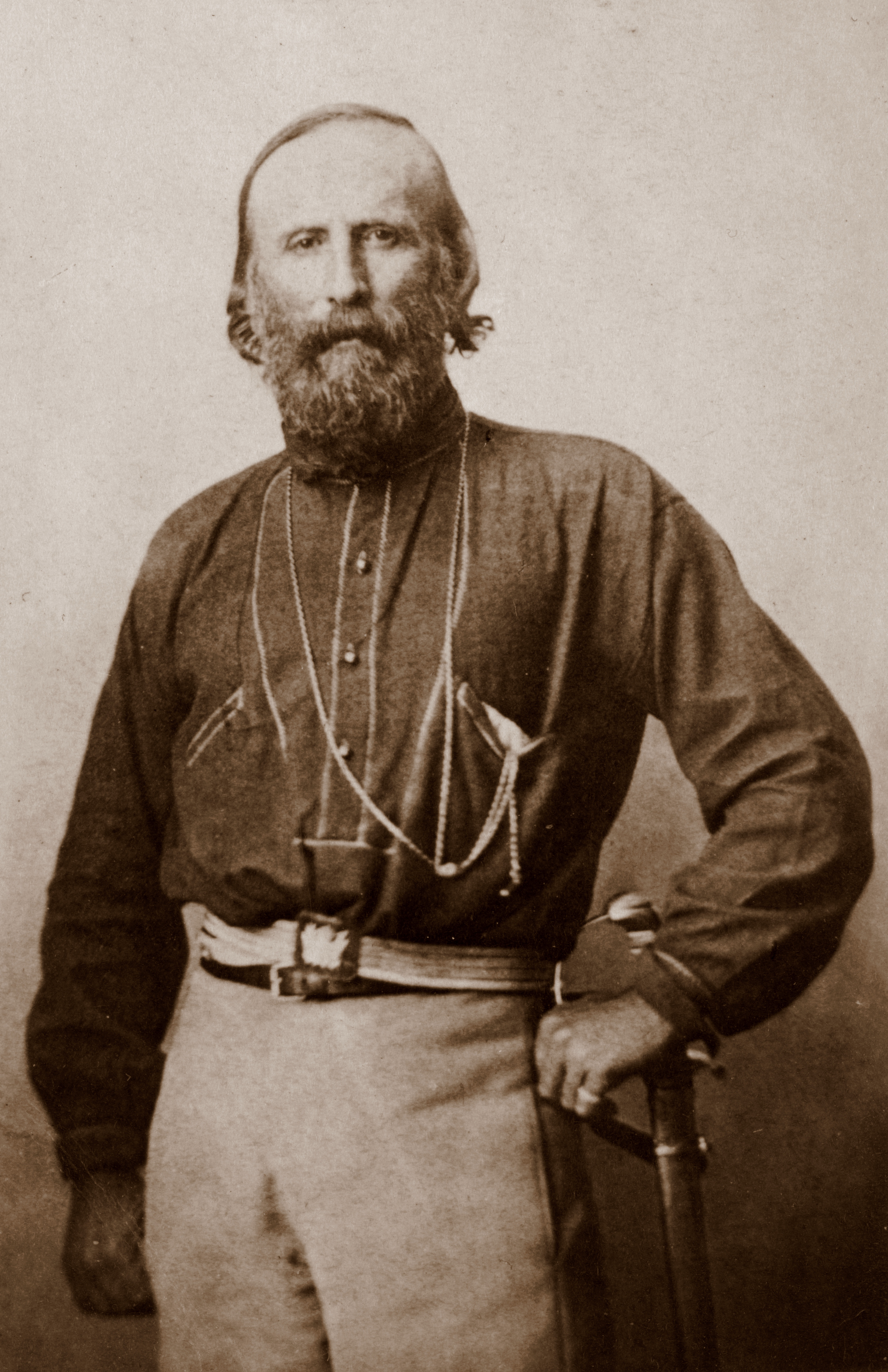
Giuseppe Garibaldi led his volunteers to major victories against vastly-superior Austrians, such as the battles of Varese and San Fermo.

Napoleon then took the command of the operations of the war, whose first major clash was the Battle of Montebello on 20 May, between the Austrian IX Corps led by Karl von Urban (under the general command of Stadion) and Forey's division, part of the French I Corps under marshal d'Hilliers. The Austrians retreated after 9 hours of combat when the Sardinian Cavalry under De Sonnaz arrived, which made Gyulai even more cautious.

Napoleon III crossed the Ticino river after the Battle of Turbigo and entered Lombardy. He advanced with part of his force and sent many other troops to the north to flank the Austrians. The Austrians planned a resistance before Milan, however they were defeated at the Battle of Magenta on 5 June, which caused Gyulai to retreat east of the river Mincio to the quadrilateral fortresses, where he was relieved of his post as commander by the Emperor Franz Josef, who assumed the command himself.

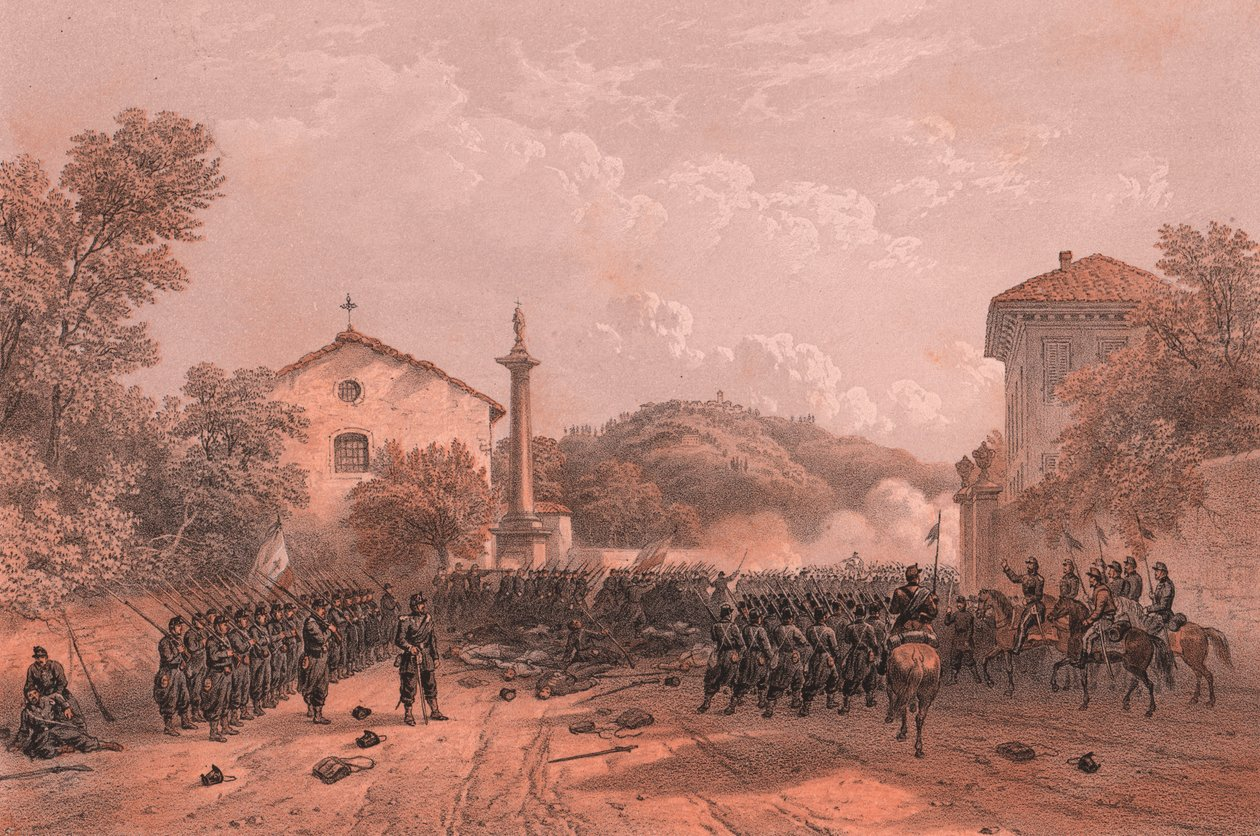
Garibaldi leads his Hunters of the Alps in the Battle of Varese.

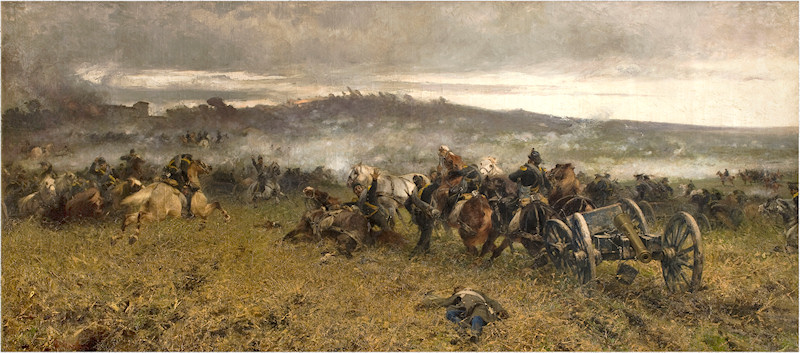
Battle of San Martino

The Piedmontese-French army took Milan and slowly marched further east to finish off Austria before Prussia could get involved.

During the retreat, the Austrians won one of their few victories of the war, when Karl von Urban defeated Giuseppe Garibaldi at the Battle of Treponti.

The Austrians found out that the French had halted at Brescia and decided that they should counterattack along the river Chiese. The two armies met accidentally around Solferino, which precipitated a confused series of battles.

A French corps held off three Austrian corps all day at Medole and kept them from joining the larger battle around Solferino, where, after a day-long battle, the French broke through. Ludwig von Benedek with the Austrian VIII Corps was separated from the main force and defended Pozzolengo against the Piedmontese part of the opposing army. It was successful, but the entire Austrian army retreated after the breakthrough at Solferino and withdrew back into the Quadrilateral.

Meanwhile, in the north of Lombardy, the Italian volunteers of Giuseppe Garibaldi's Hunters of the Alps defeated the Austrians at Varese and Como, and the Piedmontese-French Navy landed 3,000 soldiers and conquered the islands of Losinj (Lussino) and Cres (Cherso), in Dalmatia.

== Peace ==
After the Battle of Solferino, a cease fire was agreed on 8 July. The two emperors met on 11 July at Villafranca di Verona and the armistice was signed on the following day - the Peace of Villafranca.

Napoleon III signed the armistice with Austria at Villafranca for a combination of reasons. The Austrians had retreated to the Quadrilateral, which would be very costly to overrun. His absence in France had made the country vulnerable to attack. His actions in Italy were being criticised in France. He did not want Cavour and Piedmont to gain too much power, mostly at the expense of his men. He feared involvement of the German states. Most of Lombardy, with its capital, Milan, excluding only the Austrian fortresses of Mantua and Legnago and the surrounding territory, was transferred from Austria to France, which would immediately cede the territories to Sardinia. The rulers of Central Italy, who had been expelled by revolution shortly after the beginning of the war, were to be restored.

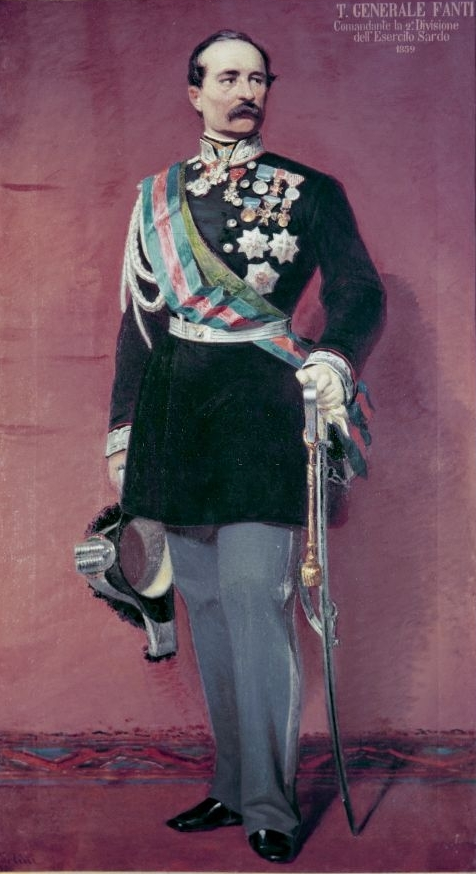
Manfredo Fanti, who led the Sardinian troops in the Battle of Palestro

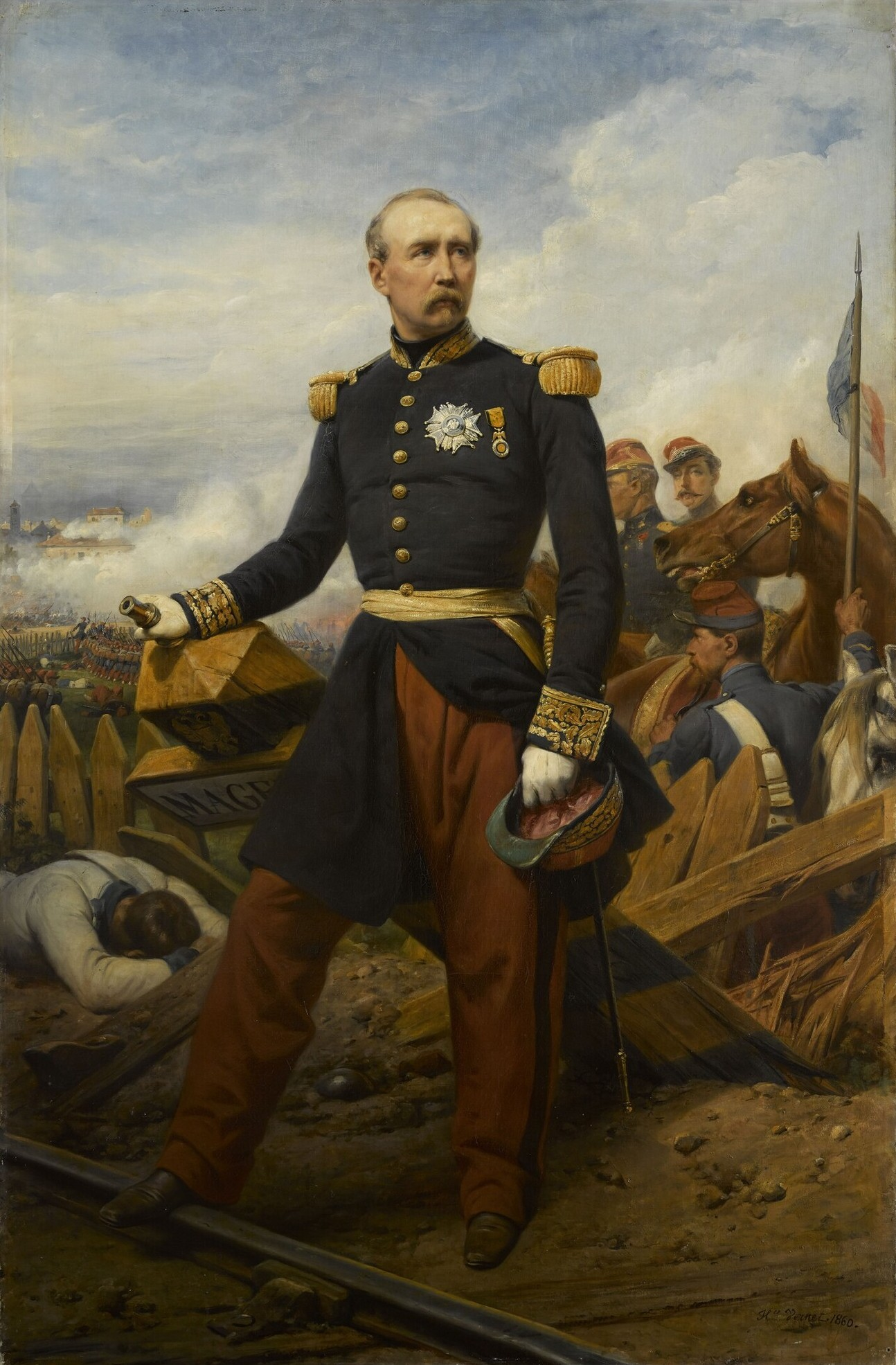
Patrice de Mac-Mahon, whose participation in the war was decisive for the victory

The agreement, made by Napoleon behind the backs of his Sardinian allies, led to great outrage in Piedmont-Sardinia, and Cavour resigned in protest. However, the Villafranca terms never took effect. Although they were reaffirmed by the final Treaty of Zürich in 11 November, the agreement had become a dead letter. The central Italian states were occupied by Piedmont, which would not restore the previous rulers, and France was unwilling to force them to do so.

The Austrians were left to look on in frustration at the French failure to carry out the terms of the treaty. Austria had emerged triumphant after the suppression of liberal movements in 1849, but its status as a great power on the European scene was now seriously challenged and its influence in Italy severely weakened.

As such, on 22 March 1860, with French and British approval, the United Provinces of Central Italy (including the Duchy of Parma, Duchy of Modena, Grand Duchy of Tuscany, and part of the Papal States) were annexed by the Kingdom of Sardinia, and France took its deferred rewards of Savoy and Nice. This latter move was vehemently opposed by Italian national hero Garibaldi, a native of Nice, and directly led to Garibaldi's expedition to Sicily, which would complete the preliminary Unification of Italy. The annexation of Nice to France caused the Niçard exodus, or the emigration of a quarter of the Niçard Italians to Italy, and the Niçard Vespers.

During the war, Prussia also mobilized 132,000 men, but never joined the fighting. The weaknesses laid bare during the mobilization caused the Prussian Army to initiate military reforms. These reforms were the basis for Prussia's rapid victories over Austria in 1866 and France in 1870-71, which led to a united Germany under Prussian dominance.

== See also ==
- The Piedmontese campaign in central Italy, 1860
