= Hunters of the Alps =

Italian special military corps

A Garibaldino of the Hunters of the Alps, ca. 1866

The Hunters of the Alps (Italian: Cacciatori delle Alpi) were a military corps created by Giuseppe Garibaldi in Cuneo on 20 February 1859 to help the regular Sardinian army to free the northern part of Italy in the Second Italian War of Independence.

As their name suggests, the corps' five regiments of volunteers operated in the Alps. Among their victories in the Second Italian War of Independence in 1859, were those over the Austrians in the Battle of Varese and the Battle of San Fermo.

They also saw action during the Third Italian War of Independence in 1866, fighting on the Prussian side against the Austrians. On this occasion, the 40,000 volunteers showed their value by achieving a decisive victory at the Battle of Bezzecca (21 July 1866), and thus nearly reaching the town of Trento.

The 22nd Infantry Division "Cacciatori delle Alpi" of World War II was named after the Hunters of the Alps unit.

== See also ==
- 52nd Infantry Regiment "Alpi"
- Invasion of Trentino (1866)
- Cacciatori d'Africa
