= Rezzato =

Rezzato Rezàt
- Comune
- Comune di Rezzato
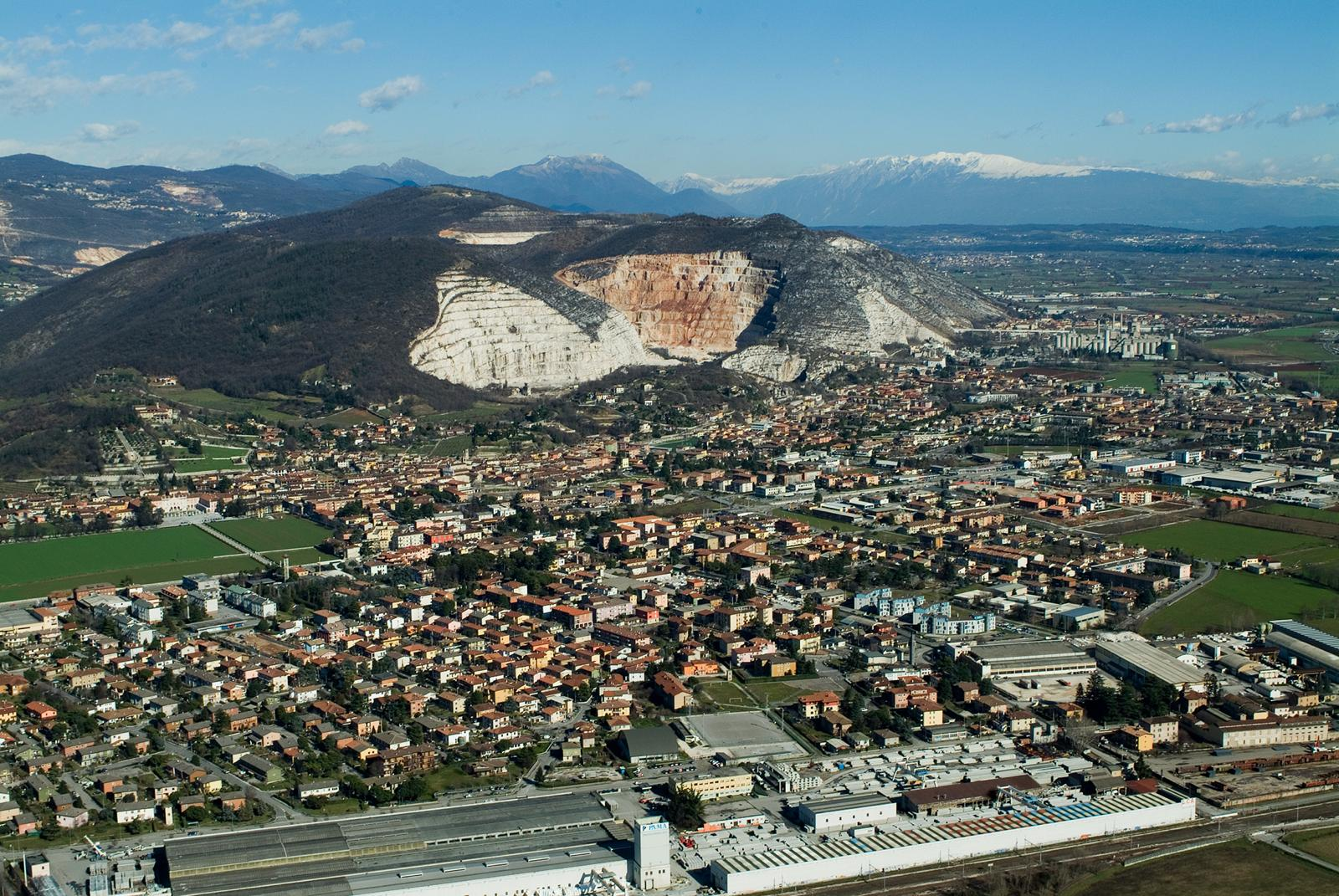

- Coat of arms

- Location within Italy Location within Lombardy
- Coordinates: 45°32′N 10°14′E
- Country: Italy
- Region: Lombardy
- Province: Brescia (BS)
- Founded: 12 March 1299
- Frazioni: Virle Treponti

Government
  - Mayor: Luca Reboldi

Area
  - Total: 18 km^{2} (6.9 sq mi)
- Elevation: 150 m (490 ft)

Population (2026)
  - Total: 13,618
  - Density: 760/km^{2} (2,000/sq mi)
- Demonym: Rezzatesi
- Time zone: UTC+1 (CET)
  - Summer (DST): UTC+2 (CEST)
- Postal code: 25086
- Dialing code: 030
- Patron saint: St. Anne
- Saint day: 26 July
- Website: Official website

Rezzato (Brescian: Rezat) is a comune in the province of Brescia, Lombardy. It is bounded by the comunes of Brescia, Botticino, Castenedolo, Mazzano and Nuvolera. It is located at the foot of the Alps and a few kilometres from Lake Garda. It is the most populous city east of Brescia.

Officially founded on 12 March 1299, Rezzato has been an important religious and administrative centre since the Middle Ages. The settlement has played a significant role in Italian history, notably during Second Italian War of Independence when the Austrians led by Field Marshal Karl von Urban defeated the Sardinians commanded by Giuseppe Garibaldi in the famous Battle of Treponti (1859). After absorbing the nearby settlement of Virle Treponti in 1928, during World War II – as many cities in northern Italy – Rezzato suffered extensive damage, leading to post-war rebuilding that significantly shaped its modern appearance.

The comune was eventually awarded city status in August 2022.

Thanks to its nearness to the small town of Botticino, Rezzato is commonly considered the town of marble working. The stonecutters from Rezzato have been famous since the 15th century for their creativity and their artistic way of working with Botticino marble. For this reason, Rezzato was chosen by the Commonwealth War Graves Commission as the place to produce some headstones for its military cemeteries. In 1911, Rezzato's marble workers processed the stone used to build the Victor Emmanuel II Monument in Rome.

== History ==
=== Early history ===
Neolithic deposits, including bones of Homo sapiens, have been found in local caves, and artefacts dating to the Bronze Age have been found at Mount Peladolo. The most important prehistorical place in the area was Ca' dei Grii, a cave on the south side of Mount Regogna. During archaeological research from 1954 to 1968, objects of the Neolithic period were discovered. The cave, a refuge for prehistoric men, served also as a temporary home for a few families during the Second World War. It was destroyed in 1969 by an adjacent marble quarry.

=== Modern era ===
The origin of the town's name is believed to stem from the medieval "Regadium," meaning "royal court," a term used to designate the area surrounding the city of Brescia. Benedictine monks contributed to the founding of Rezzato by draining the land and digging irrigation canals on the Valverde plain.

Rezzato became a free commune on 12 March 1299, when its inhabitants obtained permission from the Bishop of Brescia, Berardo Maggi (1240–1308), to separate the village from the Benedictine monastery of St. Eufemia.

In the 14th century, battles between the Guelph and Ghibelline city-states led to the domination of Milan and the surrounding territories by the powerful Visconti family, backed by Emperor Henry VII. In the 15th century, the western part of Lombardy came under the control of the Sforza family, while Brescia became part of the Venetian Republic in 1429. Under Venetian rule, local commerce and crafts flourished, and Rezzato gained renown for its marble. Stone cutting was the predominant industry in Rezzato from the 15th to the early 20th century.

Due to its proximity to the city and its favorable climate, many noble families built their summer residences in Rezzato. The noble Giacomo Chizzola (1502–1586), after withdrawing from politics, founded a school in his villa for the children of wealthy Brescia families, where they could learn Latin. It is known that the mathematician Niccolò Tartaglia (1499–1557) gave a lesson on Euclid, while Chizzola himself taught rural economics. This academy may have been one of the oldest agricultural academies in the world.

Several notable figures visited and stayed in Rezzato during the 19th century: Napoleon and Garibaldi spent a night in Villa Fenaroli, while Prime Minister Giuseppe Zanardelli often came to Rezzato in the summer to spend his holidays.

On 15 June 1859, the significant Battle of Treponti took place in Rezzato, one of the battles of the Second War of Independence, fought between Garibaldi's forces and the Austrian army led by Karl von Urban.

The municipal boundaries were expanded on 1 May 1928 with the addition of the village of Virle Treponti.

== Geography ==
=== Topography ===
The comune of Rezzato in the Province of Brescia.

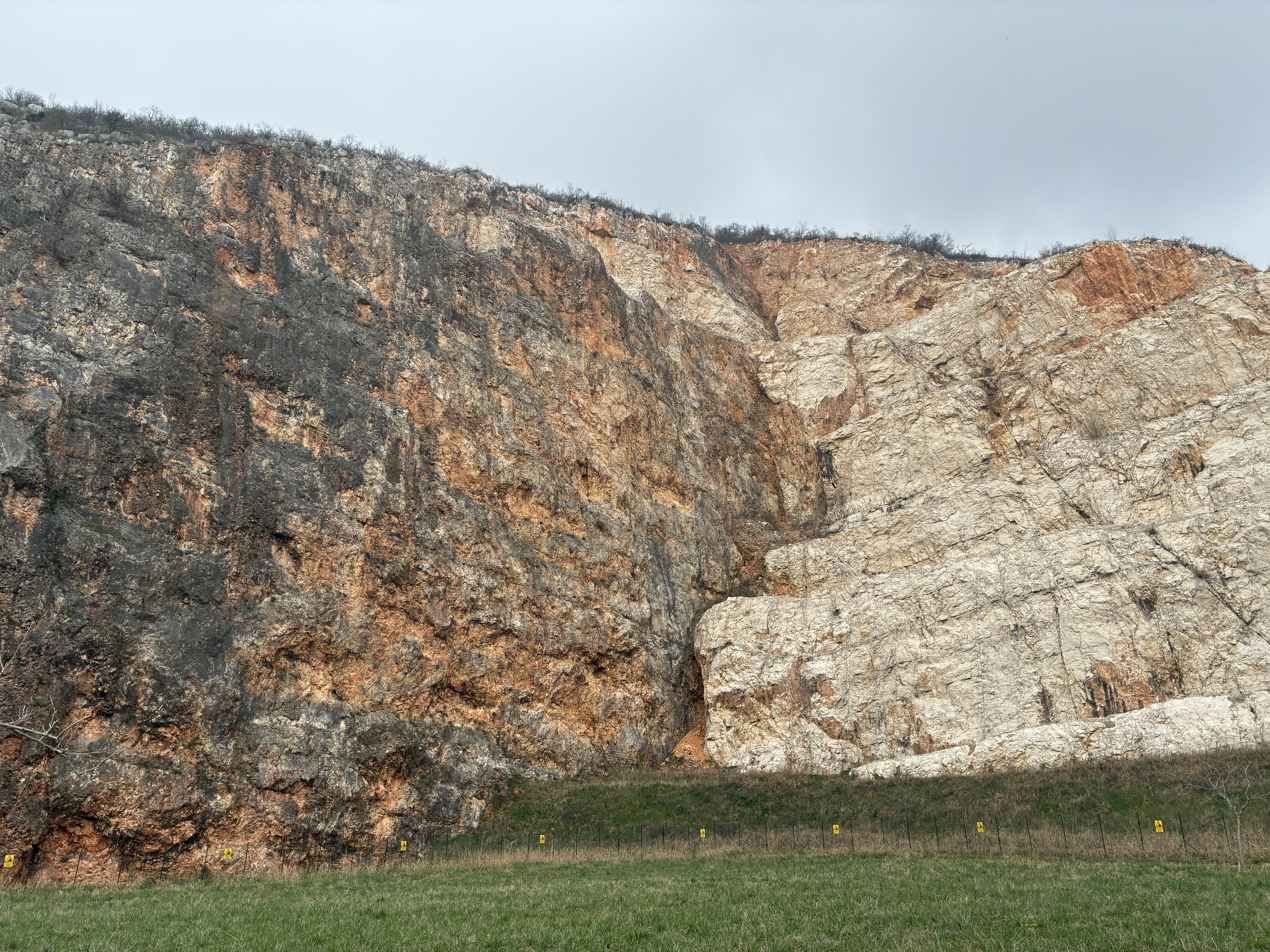
Former marble quarry Corna Rossa, now a free natural area. Typical red "corna" stone can be clearly seen on the mountain wall.

Rezzato is located in the northern section of the Po Valley, immediately east of Brescia, at the foot of the Brescian Prealps.

The territory consists of three large morphological macroregions: the flat basin between Monte Maddalena, the hills of Botticino, and Monte Regogna. The hilly system comprises mountains Regogna, Fieno — the highest point of the municipal territory at 430 metres (1,410 ft) — and Marguzzo, alongside two hills called Peladolo and Poggio San Martino. While the northern part of the territory is hilly, the southern area is flat.

The administrative comune covers a total area of 18.2 square kilometres (7.0 mi^{2}).

The hills of the area are composed of various types of stone. The first of these is the "corna", consisting of calcium carbonate and magnesium, which formed approximately 193 million years ago. This stone is present throughout the basin between Monte Regogna and Monte Marguzzo, including Poggio San Martino. Geological studies conducted on Monte Regogna have led to the identification of various fossilized forms of marine life. The geological age of the "corso" stone began shortly after that of the corna. This stone is located in the lower parts of Monte Regogna; due to these lower elevations historically being submerged by the sea, fossilized shells of ammonites and sea urchins have been found here. The "medolo", which rises on the west side of Monte Regogna, is a younger formation (dating to 178 million years ago) and is composed of limestone marbles. The medolo is characteristic of a deep marine environment, resulting in a high abundance of fossilized shells.

Located just 20 kilometres (12 mi) from Lake Garda, the town is crossed by the Naviglio Grande Bresciano, an ancient canal built in 1253. A vast network of small, now mostly covered canals originates from it, which continues to be used for agriculture. Other notable waterways include the Rino, a torrent that descends from the mountains, crosses the historic center of Virle Treponti, and merges with the Naviglio Grande near the Treponti highway. Near the mouth of the Rino, the Lupa canal flows out from the Naviglio, running through the countryside south of Treponti toward Castenedolo. Additionally, the Rino Musia torrent descends from Botticino, crossing part of the northeastern wooded area of the town before entering the city of Brescia.

=== Climate ===
According to the Köppen climate classification, Rezzato has a humid subtropical climate (Cfa). Its average annual temperature is 14.2 °C (58 °F): 18.7 °C (66 °F) during the day and 9.6 °C (49 °F) at night. The warmest months are June, July, and August, with high temperatures from 28 °C (82 °F) to 30.4 °C (87 °F). The coldest are December, January, and February, with low temperatures from −0.3 °C (31 °F) to 0.6 °C (33 °F).

Winter is cold but snowfall is rare; it mainly occurs from December through February. Summer can be sultry when humidity levels are high and peak temperatures can reach 38 °C (100 °F). Spring and autumn are generally pleasant, with temperatures ranging between 10 °C (50 °F) and 20 °C (68 °F).

The relative humidity is high throughout the year, especially in winter when it causes fog, mainly from dusk until late morning, although the phenomenon has become increasingly less frequent in recent years.

Precipitation is spread evenly throughout the year. The driest month is December, while the wettest months are April/May and October/November.

Climate data for Rezzato (Ghedi Air Base) (1991–2020 normals, extremes 1951–present)
Month	Jan	Feb	Mar	Apr	May	Jun	Jul	Aug	Sep	Oct	Nov	Dec	Year
Record high °C (°F)	19.9 (67.8)	22.0 (71.6)	27.3 (81.1)	30.6 (87.1)	35.3 (95.5)	38.0 (100.4)	38.2 (100.8)	38.4 (101.1)	33.3 (91.9)	29.0 (84.2)	22.8 (73.0)	17.0 (62.6)	38.4 (101.1)
Mean daily maximum °C (°F)	6.5 (43.7)	9.4 (48.9)	14.8 (58.6)	18.9 (66.0)	23.8 (74.8)	28.0 (82.4)	30.4 (86.7)	30.2 (86.4)	25.2 (77.4)	18.6 (65.5)	11.9 (53.4)	6.9 (44.4)	18.7 (65.7)
Daily mean °C (°F)	3.1 (37.6)	5.0 (41.0)	9.7 (49.5)	13.7 (56.7)	18.6 (65.5)	22.8 (73.0)	25.0 (77.0)	24.8 (76.6)	20.2 (68.4)	14.6 (58.3)	8.7 (47.7)	3.7 (38.7)	14.2 (57.5)
Mean daily minimum °C (°F)	−0.3 (31.5)	0.6 (33.1)	4.6 (40.3)	8.6 (47.5)	13.4 (56.1)	17.7 (63.9)	19.7 (67.5)	19.4 (66.9)	15.2 (59.4)	10.6 (51.1)	5.6 (42.1)	0.5 (32.9)	9.6 (49.4)
Record low °C (°F)	−19.4 (−2.9)	−14.6 (5.7)	−9.3 (15.3)	−2.5 (27.5)	0.2 (32.4)	5.2 (41.4)	9.4 (48.9)	8.1 (46.6)	3.8 (38.8)	−5.8 (21.6)	−8.2 (17.2)	−15.2 (4.6)	−19.4 (−2.9)
Average precipitation mm (inches)	53.1 (2.09)	47.1 (1.85)	53.9 (2.12)	76.2 (3.00)	91.1 (3.59)	75.9 (2.99)	62.0 (2.44)	78.2 (3.08)	96.4 (3.80)	102.1 (4.02)	106.7 (4.20)	71.0 (2.80)	913.7 (35.98)
Average precipitation days (≥ 1.0 mm)	5.6	5.4	5.4	8.2	9.0	7.4	5.0	5.3	6.5	7.8	8.8	6.7	81.1
Average relative humidity (%)	86	81	75	76	73	71	72	72	75	79	85	86	78
Source 1: Istituto Superiore per la Protezione e la Ricerca Ambientale
Source 2: Servizio Meteorologico (humidity 1961–1990)

== Demographics ==
Historical population
Year	Pop.	±%
1861	3,021	—
1871	3,163	+4.7%
1881	3,207	+1.4%
1901	3,805	+18.6%
1911	4,201	+10.4%
1921	4,504	+7.2%
1931	5,299	+17.7%
1936	5,586	+5.4%
1951	6,783	+21.4%
1961	7,433	+9.6%
1971	8,724	+17.4%
1981	10,644	+22.0%
1991	11,460	+7.7%
2001	12,295	+7.3%
2011	12,933	+5.2%
2021	13,345	+3.2%
Source: ISTAT 2021

Rezzato had a population of 13,618 inhabitants as of 30 April 2026.

Since the end of World War II, mirroring broader trends across Lombardy, Rezzato has experienced two major waves of mass migration. These demographic shifts corresponded with distinct economic phases. The first wave coincided with the Italian economic miracle of the 1950s and 1960s, a period of rapid industrial growth driven by heavy manufacturing and public works. This migration primarily involved Italians relocating from rural areas, mountainous regions, and cities across Southern Italy, North-East Italy, and other provinces within Lombardy.

The second wave occurred during the late 20th and early 21st centuries, taking place against the backdrop of a transitioning economy centered around services, small-scale manufacturing, and post-industrial development. Unlike the first wave, this later migration predominantly consisted of foreign immigrants moving to the municipality from outside the Italian peninsula.

Rezzato is today mostly cosmopolitan and multicultural. As of 2026, the foreign-born population is 1,733, making up 12.7% of the total population. The largest immigrant group comes from Eastern European nations (mostly Romania, Ukraine, Moldova and Albania), the others from Asia (mostly China, Pakistan, India and Sri Lanka) and Africa. The town is predominantly Roman Catholic, but due to immigration now has some Orthodox Christian and Muslim followers.

Regions of birth (2026)
1. Italy (86.9%)
2. Rest of Europe (4.80%)
3. Africa (1.30%)
4. Asia (6.60%)
5. Americas (0.40%)
6. Other (0.01%)

Foreign countries of birth	Population (2026)
Romania	380
Pakistan	187
China	117
Egypt	112
Ukraine	103
India	100
Sri Lanka	85
Morocco	83
Moldova	80
Ghana	66
Nigeria	56
Albania	50
others	each <50

== Municipal government ==
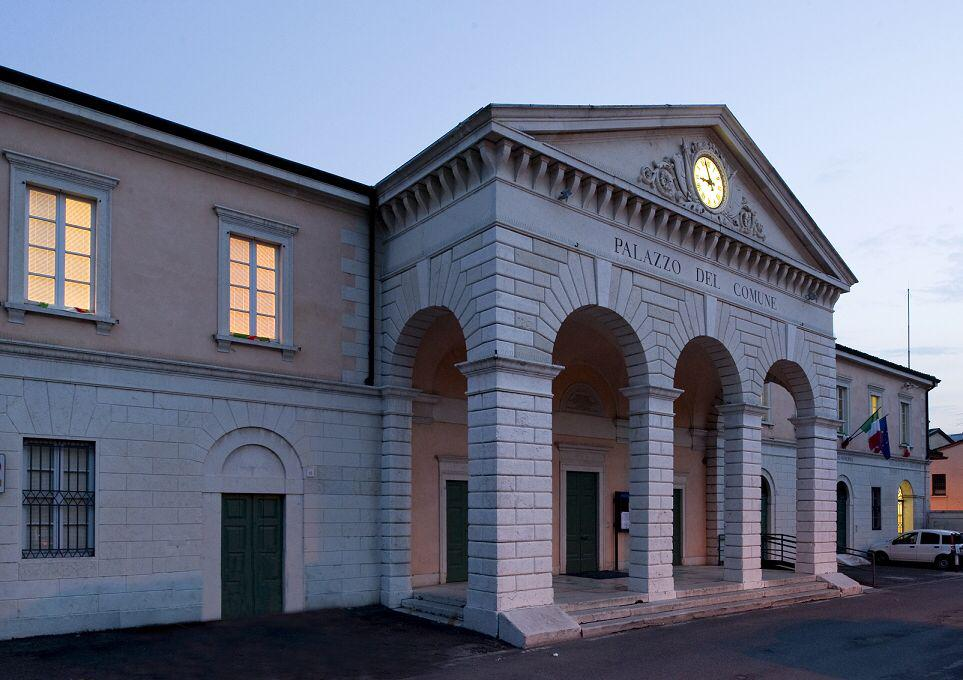
The Town Hall.

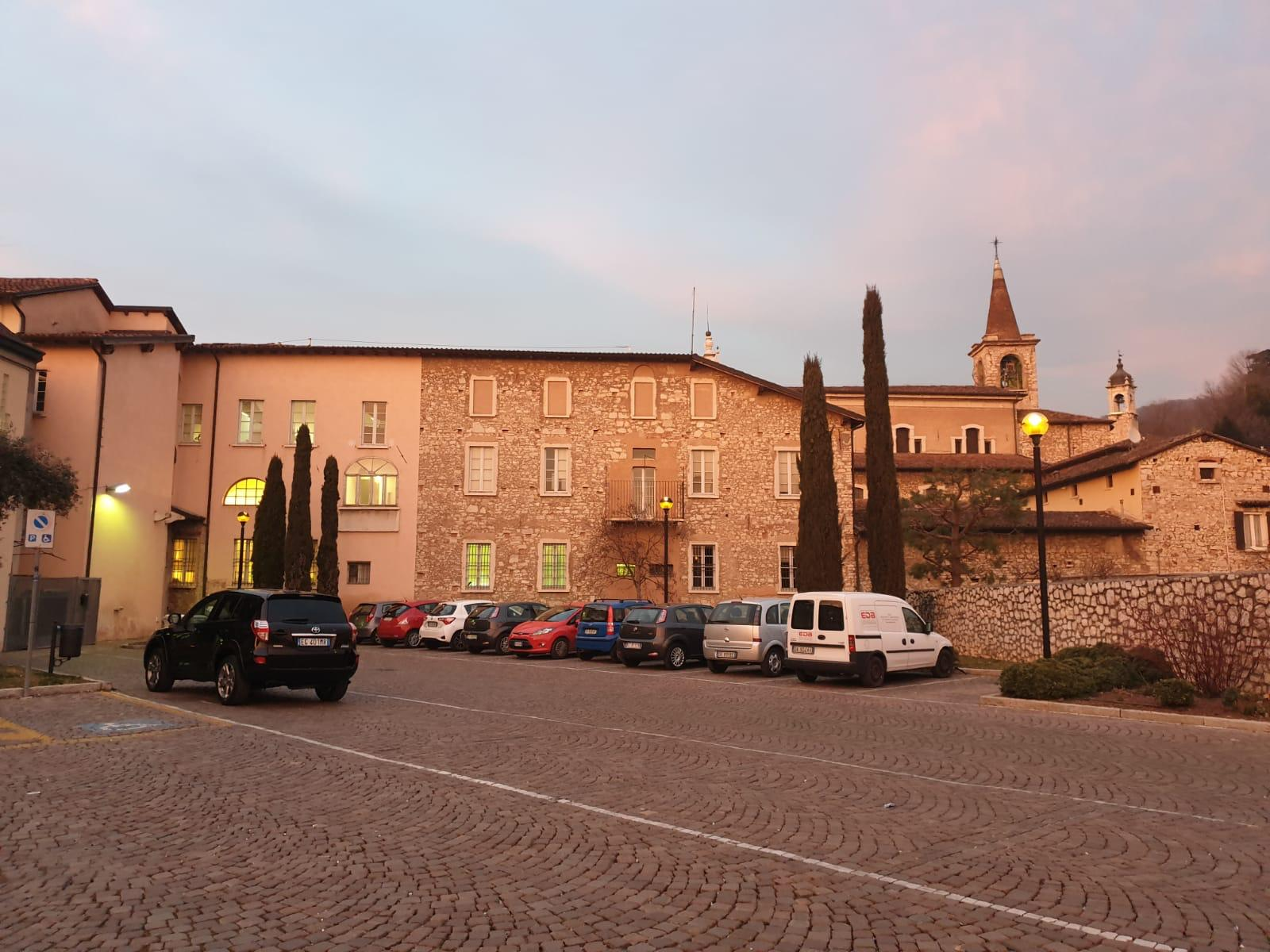
The Town Hall seen from the back.

Rezzato is headed by a mayor (sindaco) assisted by a legislative body, the consiglio comunale, and an executive body, the giunta comunale. Since 1995, the mayor and members of the consiglio comunale are directly elected together by resident citizens, while from 1945 to 1995 the mayor was chosen by the legislative body. The giunta comunale is chaired by the mayor, who appoints others members, called assessori. The offices of the comune are housed in a building usually called the municipio or palazzo comunale.

Since 1995, the mayor of Rezzato is directly elected by citizens, originally every four, then every five years. The current mayor is Luca Reboldi, elected on 9 June 2024 with 53% of the votes.

This is a list of the mayors of Rezzato since 1945:

Mayor	Term start	Term end	Party
Vaifro Sberna	5 May 1945	26 August 1957 (Note: Died in office.)	DC
Fortunato Pasquali	26 August 1957	8 March 1970	DC
Fausto Cargnoni	20 July 1970	1 October 1985	DC
Giuseppe Joannes	1 October 1985	24 April 1995	DC
Augusto Berardi	24 April 1995	14 June 2004	Ind (Note: Centre-left independent.)
Enrico Danesi	14 June 2004	26 May 2014	Ind
Davide Giacomini	26 May 2014	27 May 2019	Ind
Giovanni Ventura	27 May 2019	10 June 2024	Lega
Luca Reboldi	10 June 2024	Incumbent	Ind

== Main sights ==
=== Civil sights ===
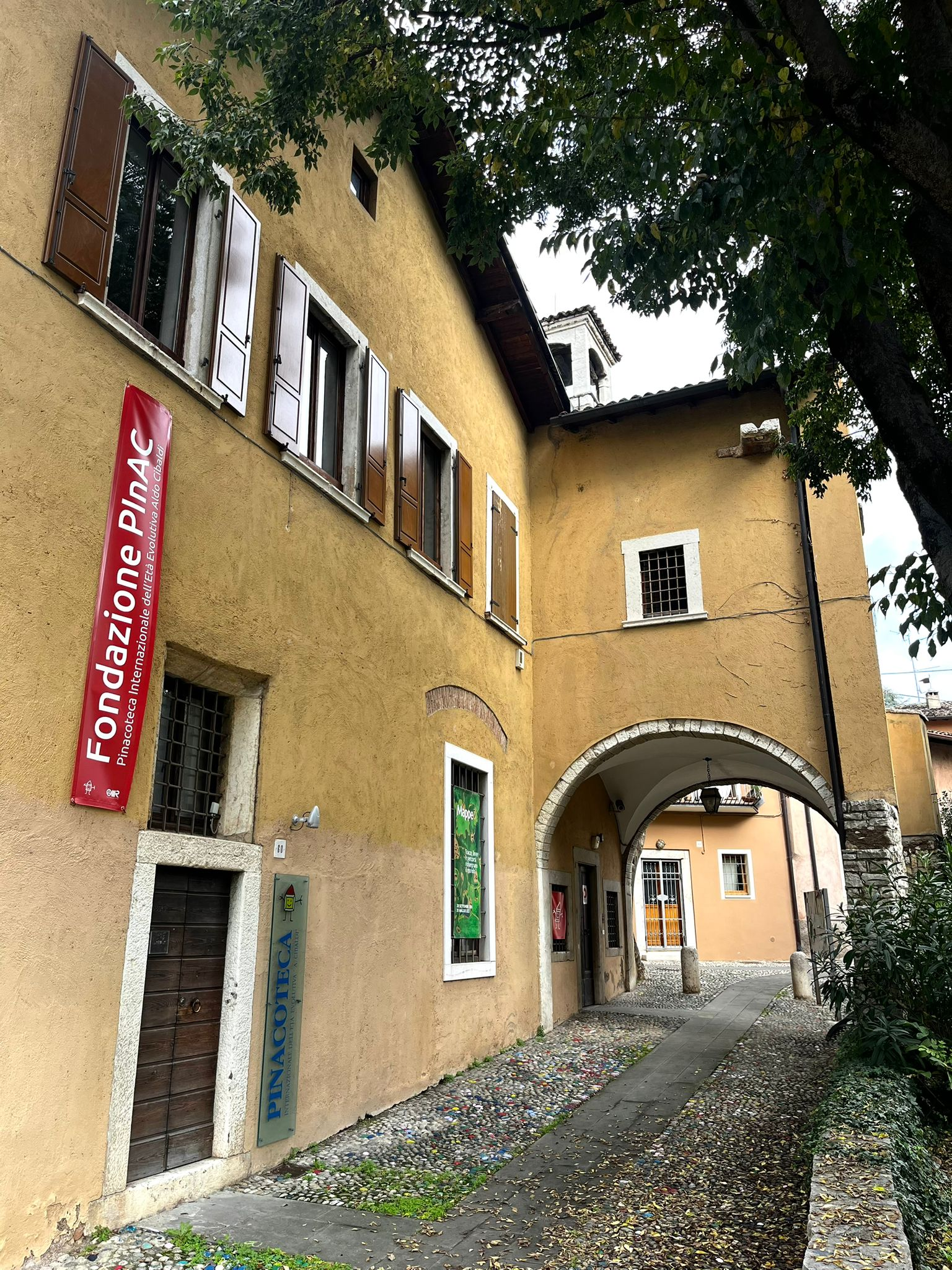
Former St. Alexander church homes the PInAC since 1999.

- The Pinacoteca Internazionale dell'Età Evolutiva "Aldo Cibaldi" (also known as PInAC) officially opened in 1969 and is the most prominent museum in the town. It is housed in a former deconsecrated church dedicated to St. Alexander on Via Disciplina. The facility holds a collection of more than 8,000 works of art. Operating as both an art gallery and an open educational center, PInAC offers training courses and experimental didactic activities. The institution continues to collect, study, and catalog drawings created by children, and collaborates with schools to promote children's art and their perspective on the world. The museum's collections are notable for their multi-ethnic character, featuring pieces from numerous countries. Additionally, the gallery organizes workshops for adults led by nationally and internationally recognized artists.
- Villa Avogadro-Fenaroli is one of the most famous sight in Rezzato, being home to the noble Avogadros and Fenarolis from Brescia for nearly four centuries. Its north wing dates to the 16th century as well as the balcony overlooking today's via Scalabrini. Gothic greenhouses were built in 1840, while gardens were rearranged in 1863. The villa is a Palace Hotel since 2006.
- The Bacchus' Gardens (Italian: I Giardini di Bacco) is a public park located on the summit of St. Peter's Hill (Colle di San Pietro). During the 18th century, the grounds were the private property of the Fenaroli family. The park features scenic monumental staircases situated directly behind Villa Fenaroli. Inside the gardens, an 18th-century small temple commemorates the Greek god Bacchus. In 2001, thieves stole the temple's pillars, causing its dome and trabeation to collapse to the ground. The Municipality of Rezzato promptly restored the structure, recovering a key symbol of the town's historical identity.
- The Rodolfo Vantini School (Italian: Scuola d'Arte e Mestieri "Rodolfo Vantini"): a primary factor in the success of Brescian Neoclassicism was the widespread use of white Botticino marble. However, executing a style that demanded precision required highly skilled stonecutters, carvers, and sculptors. To meet this need, the prominent Brescian architect Rodolfo Vantini established a school in Rezzato to train local marble workers. The institution opened in 1839 within the town hall. It was later relocated to a modern facility in the southern district of the town, where it continues to operate as the oldest active trade school in Lombardy.

==== Gallery ====
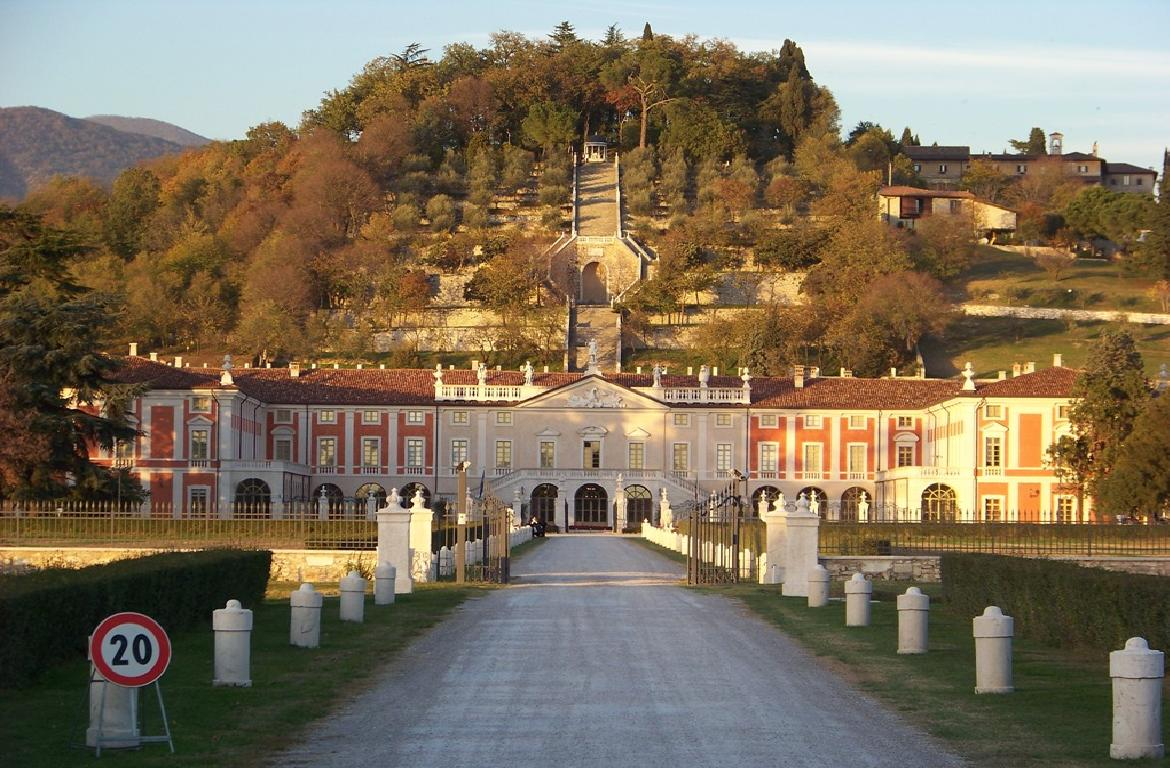
Villa Avogadro-Fenaroli

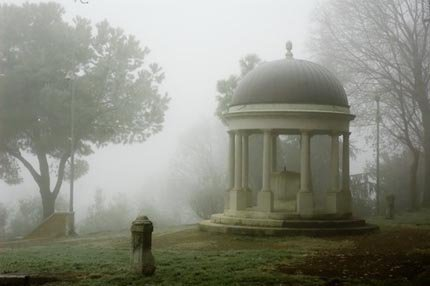
Bacchus' Temple on St. Peter's Hill

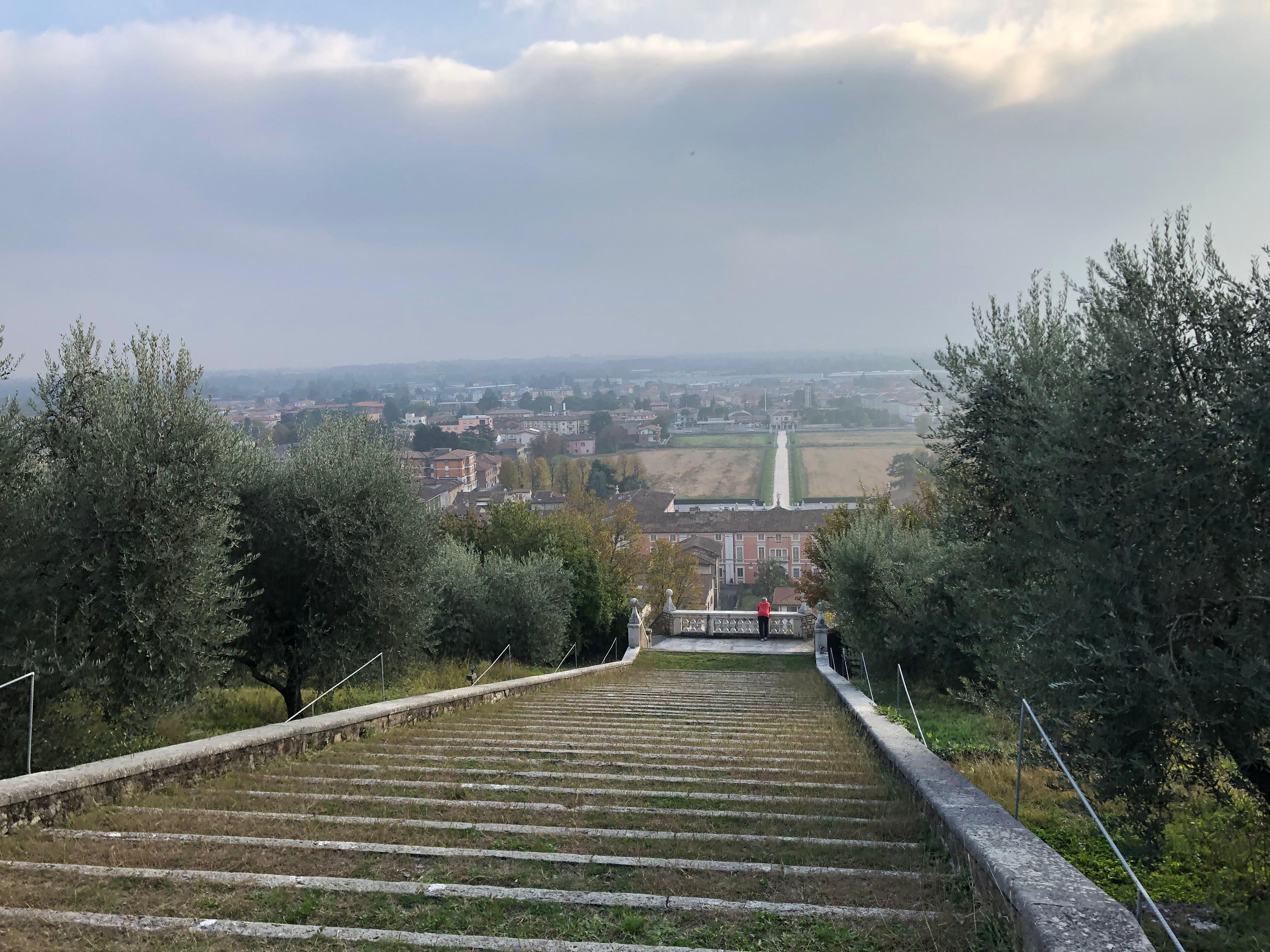
Bacchus' Gardens staircase

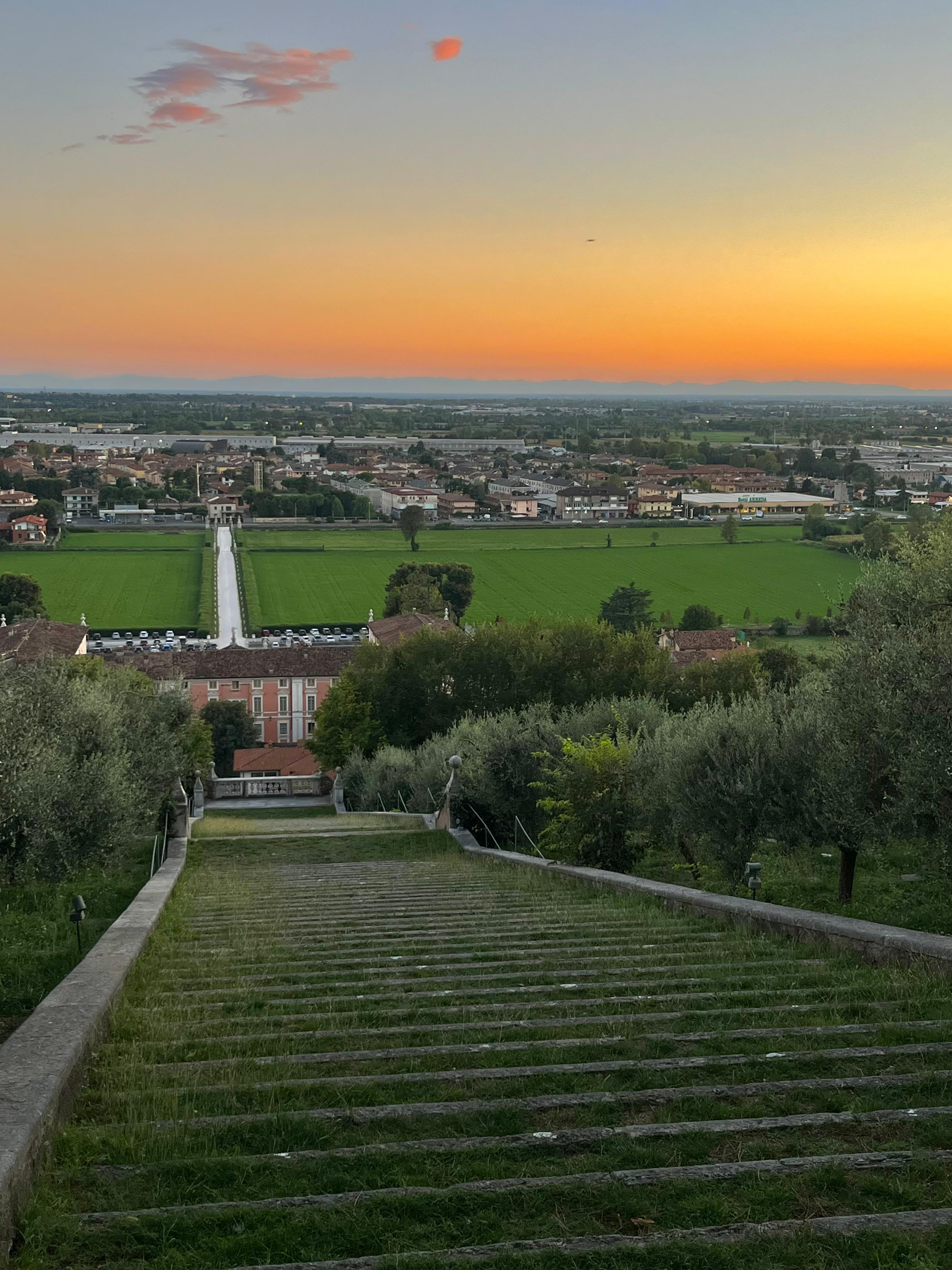
Apennine Mountains seen from Bacchus' Gardens

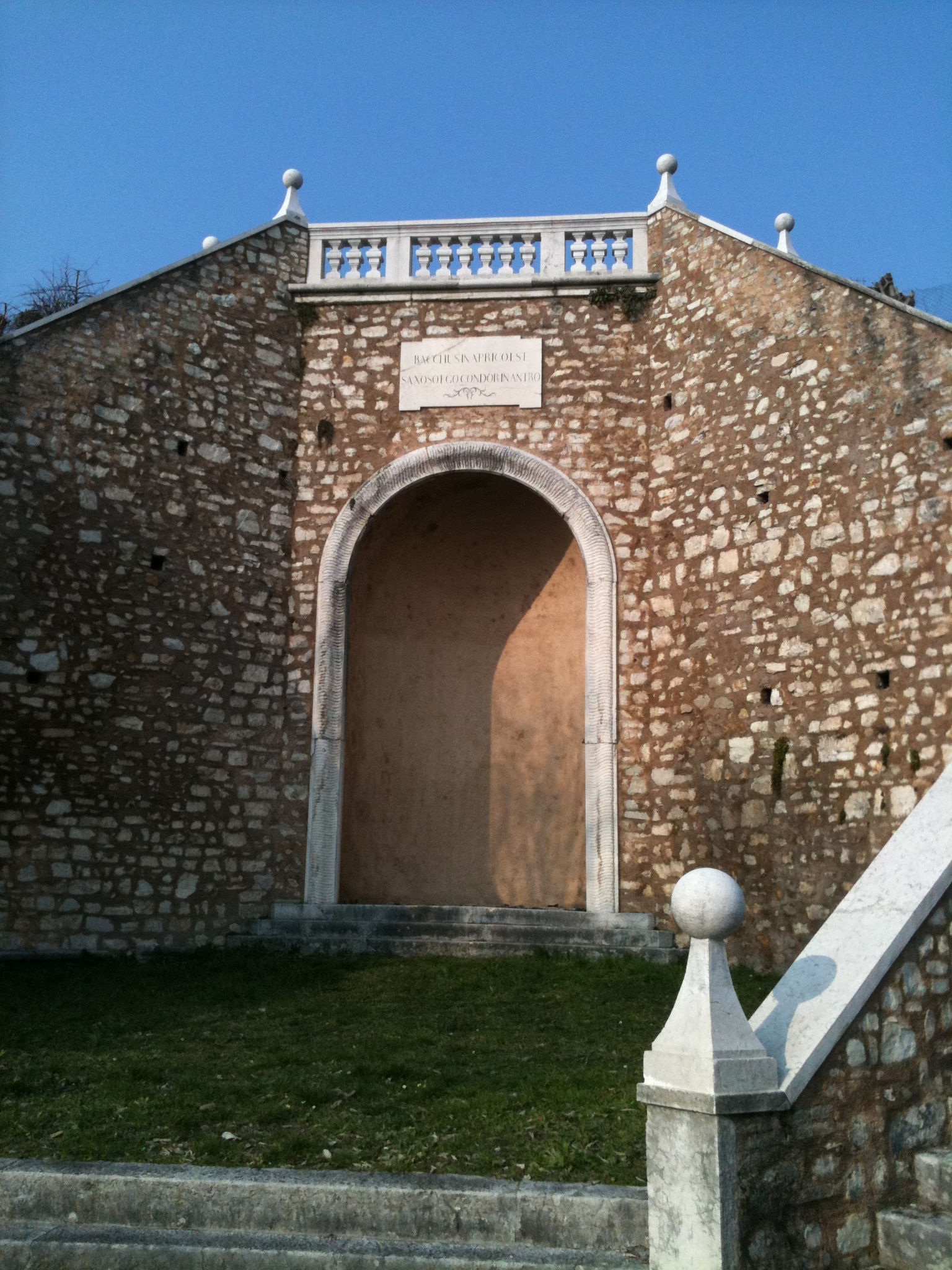
Niche of Venus in Bacchus' Gardens

=== Churches and religious sights ===
==== Sanctuary of Our Lady of Valverde ====
The sanctuary was built in a large wooded area in the northern part of the town known as "Valverde" (meaning "green valley"). A small chapel called the Rotonda, erected in 1099, represents the earliest evidence of Christian worship in the entire area.

The main sanctuary was constructed between 1601 and 1643, following a pastoral visit by the Archbishop of Milan, Carlo Borromeo. He ordered the construction of a large church on the rural site to consolidate numerous abandoned and ruined altars that had been scattered haphazardly across the area during the 15th century.

The site is historically significant within the province due to the "Miracle of Valverde", a simultaneous Marian and Christological apparition that allegedly took place in the summer of 1399. According to contemporary chronicles, a local peasant working in his field witnessed a man dressed in red, whom he recognized as Christ. The figure instructed the peasant to throw three loaves of bread from his haversack into a nearby pond. Upon reaching the pond, the peasant encountered the Virgin Mary, who intercepted him and ordered him to return to Christ without discarding the bread. After a final exchange between the two figures, the Virgin Mary explained that the three loaves symbolized war, famine, and plague. By instructing him to throw only one loaf (symbolizing the plague) into the water, she interceded to spare the region from war and famine.

Local chronicles record a subsequent apparition on 11 October 1711, when two boys gathering chestnuts in the nearby woods reported seeing a bright light emanating from the pond and hearing a female voice calling out to them.

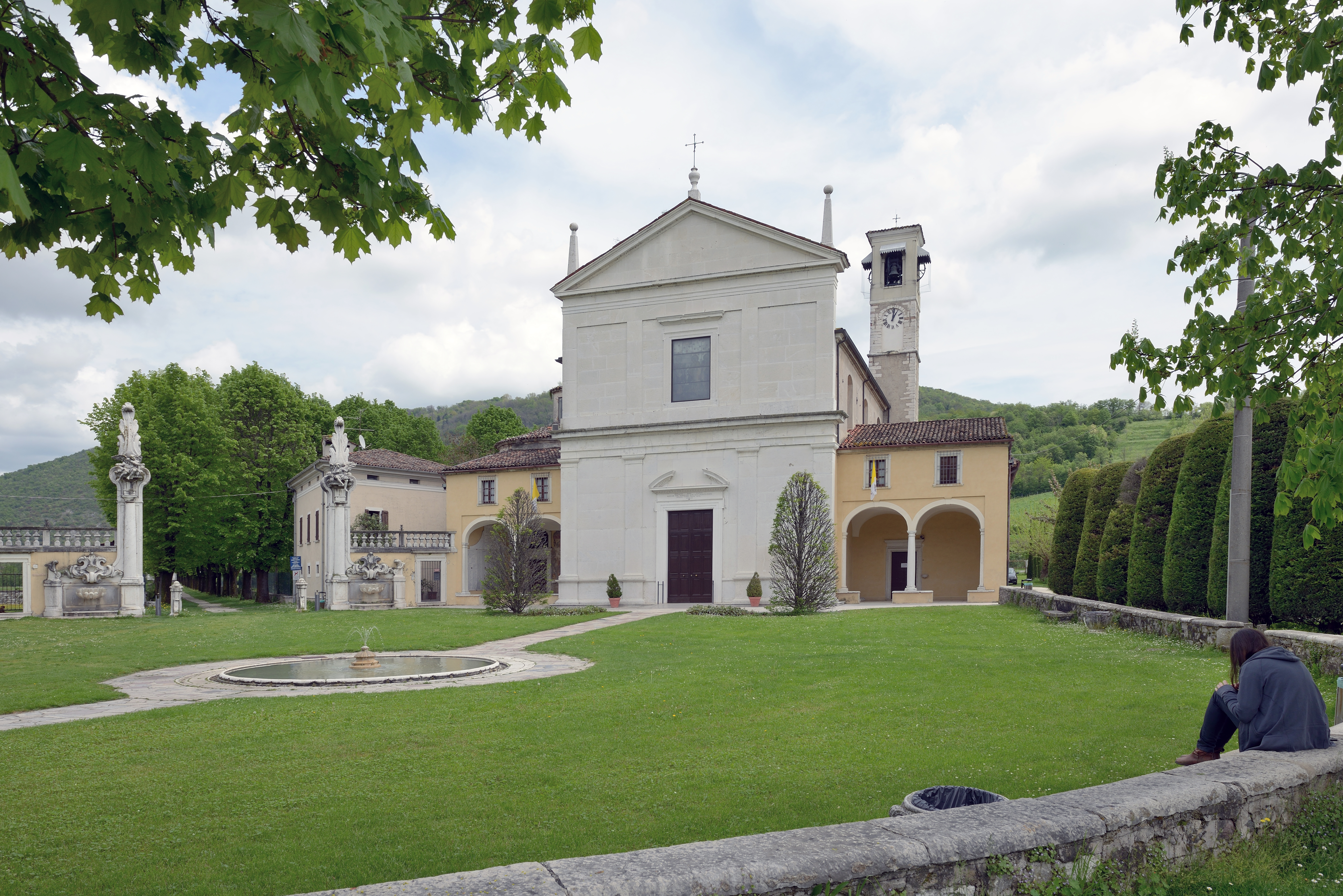
The sanctuary

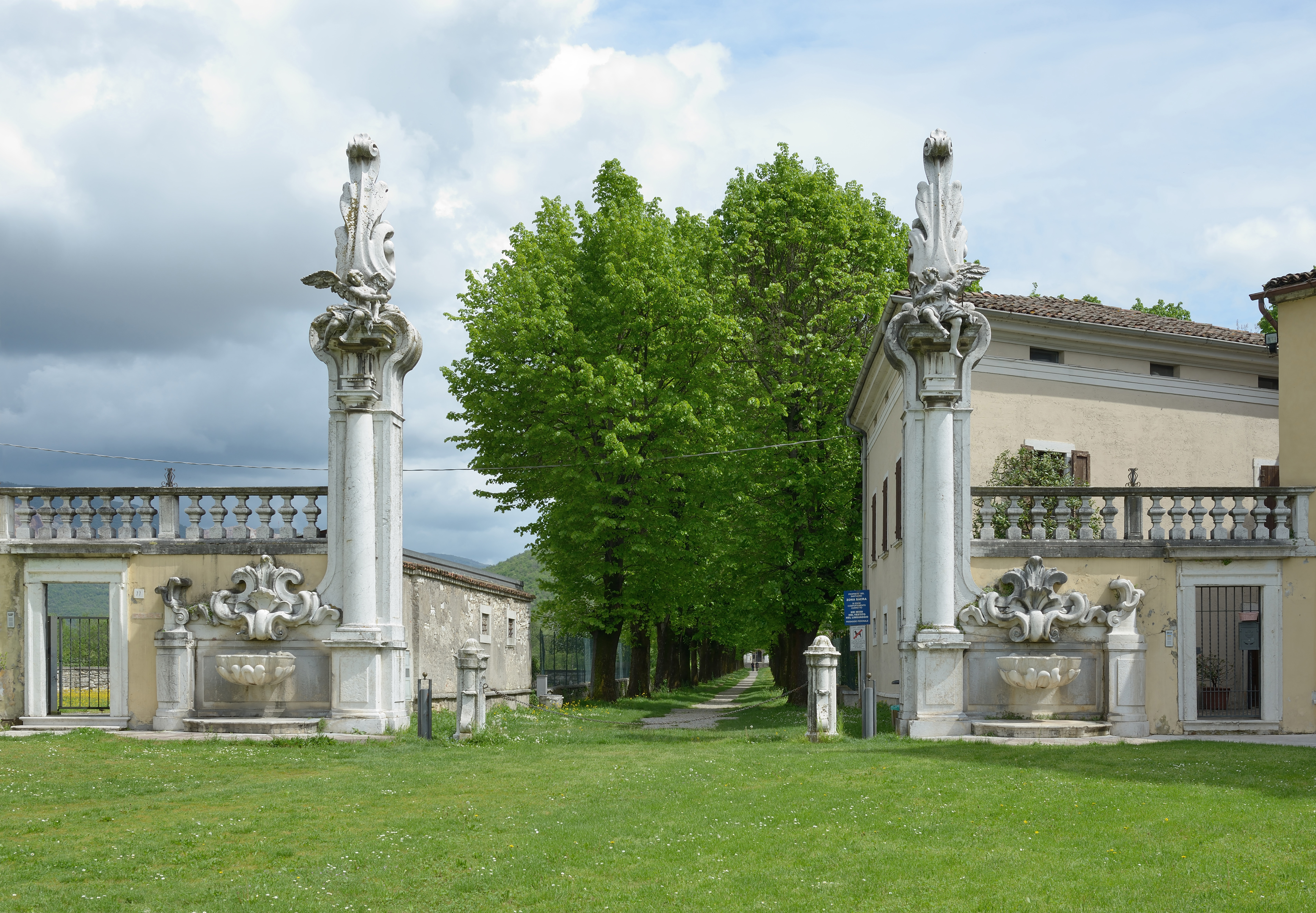
The tree-lined avenue towards the chapel

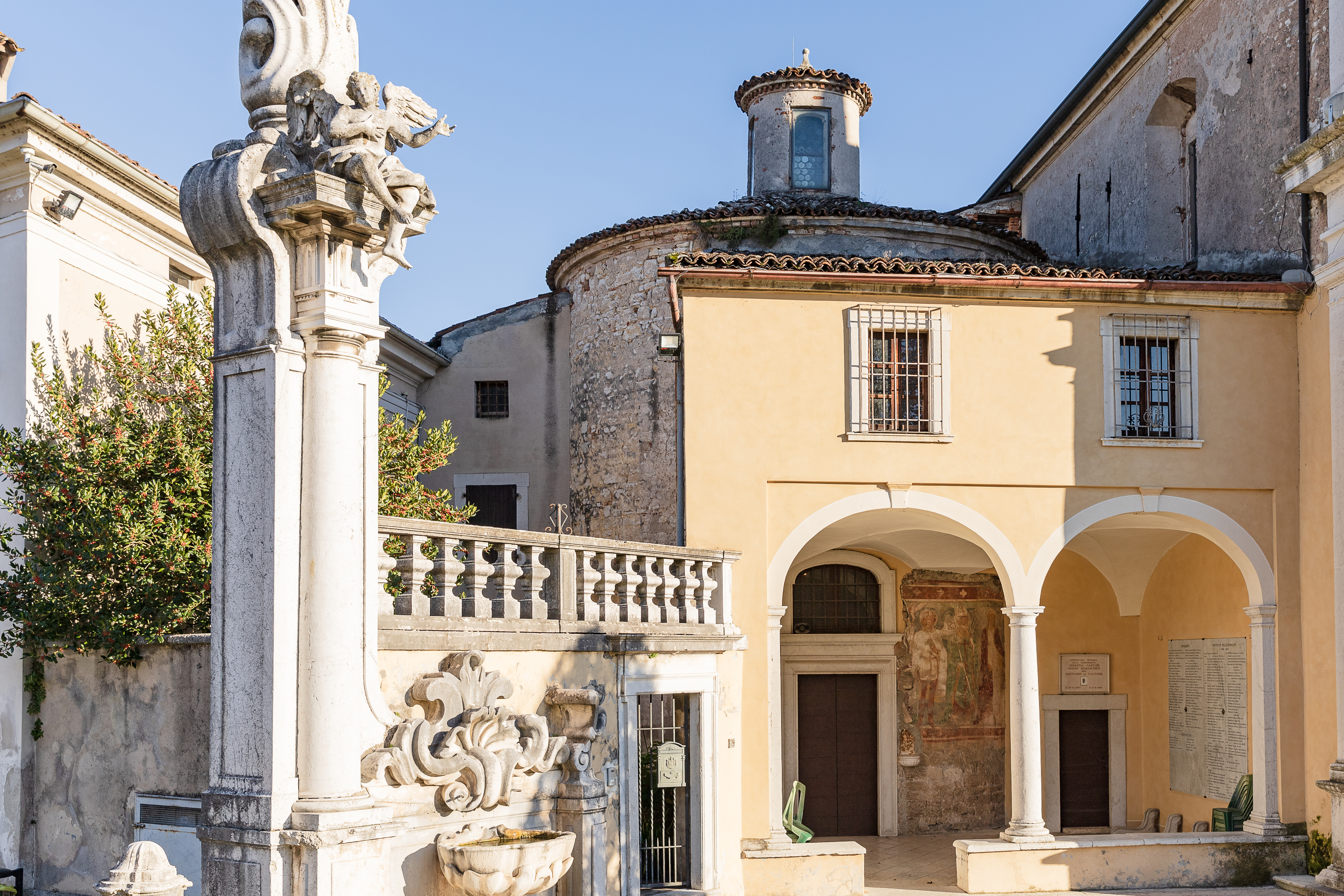
The medieval Rotonda (1099)

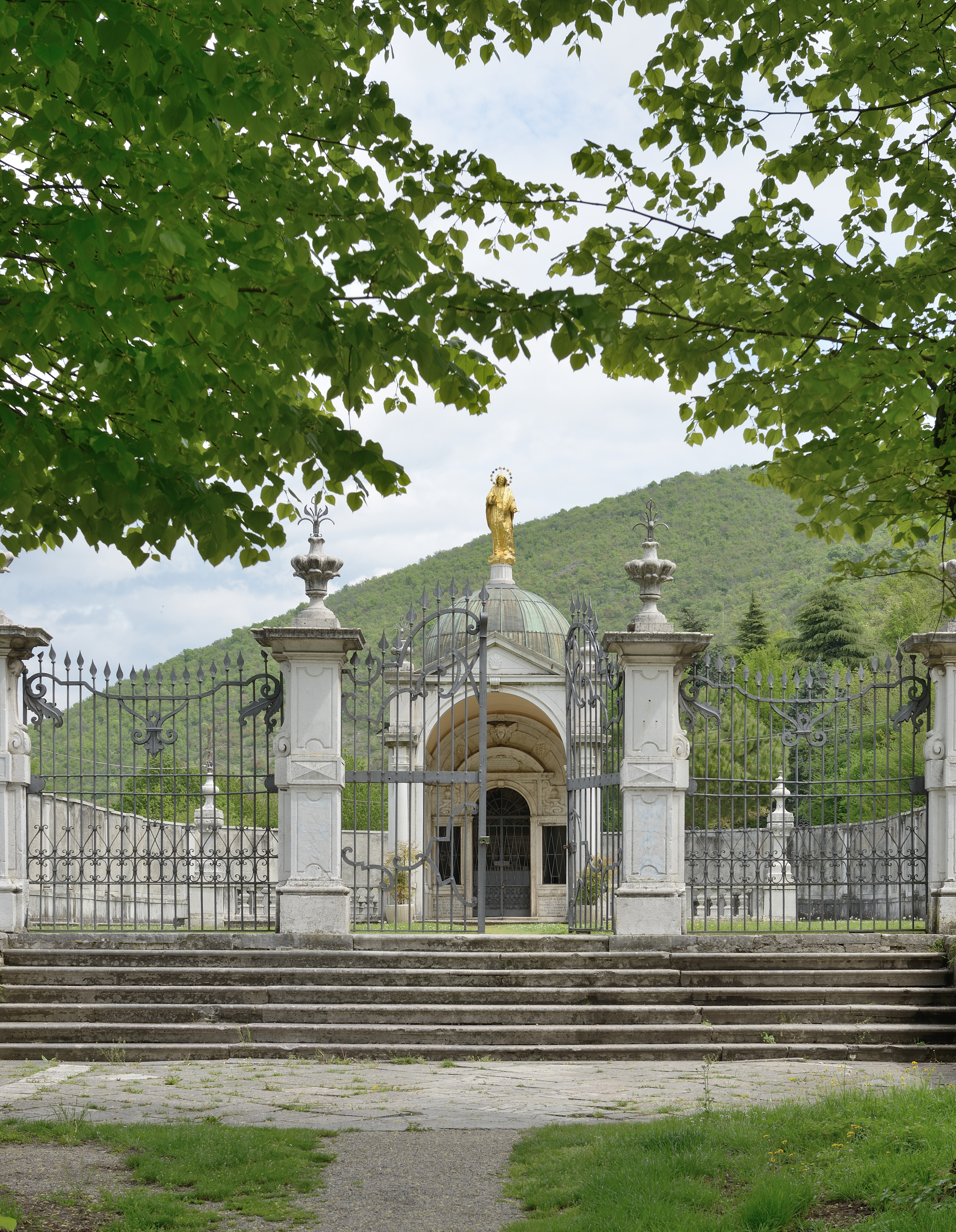
The chapel on the sacred pond, entrance

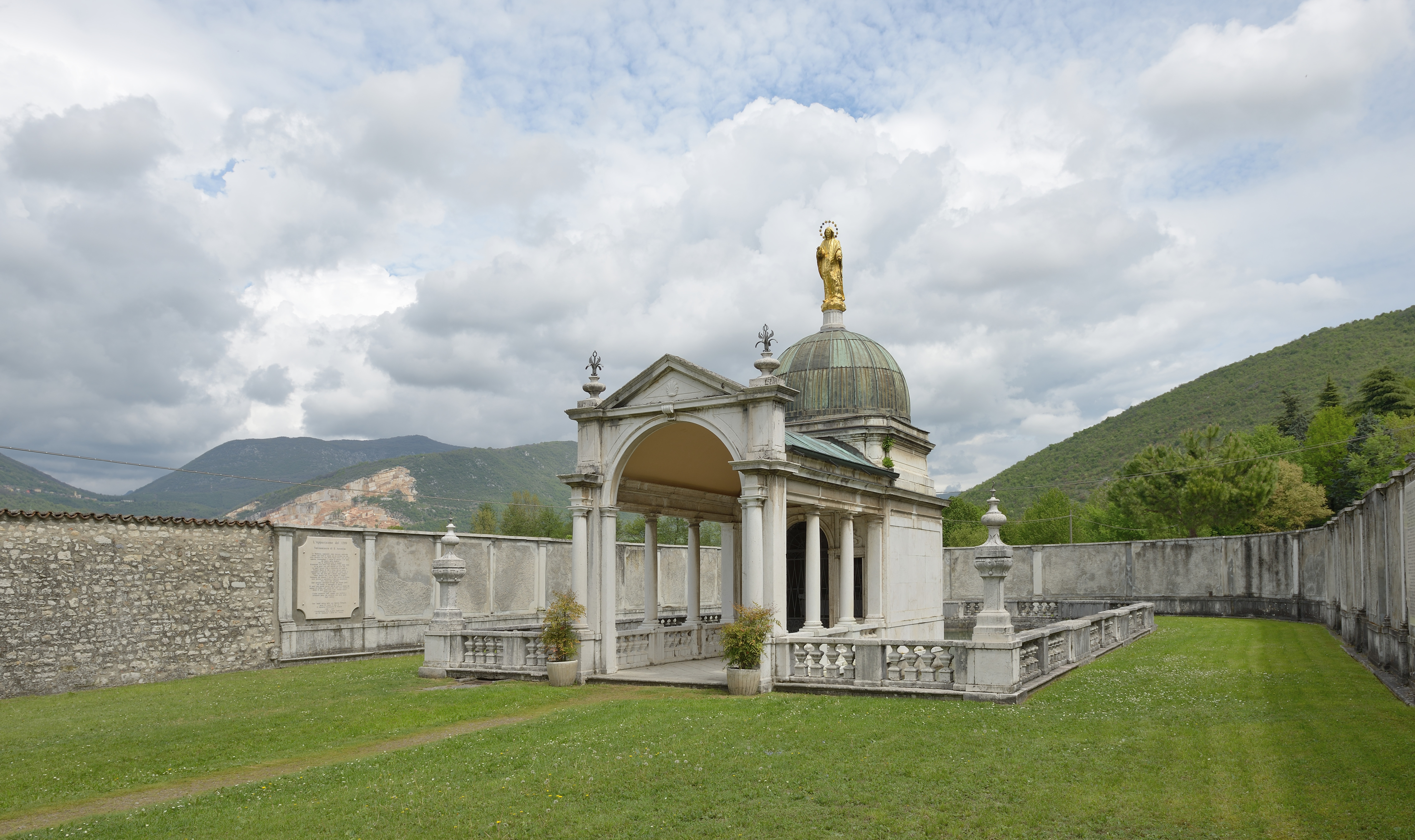
The cahpel on the sacred pond

===== St. Anne religious procession =====
To commemorate the 1399 apparition, a historical reenactment is held annually on the last Sunday of July. A religious procession travels from the town center to the sanctuary and the sacred pond, where a participant dressed as the peasant dives into the water to symbolically retrieve a loaf of the holy bread.

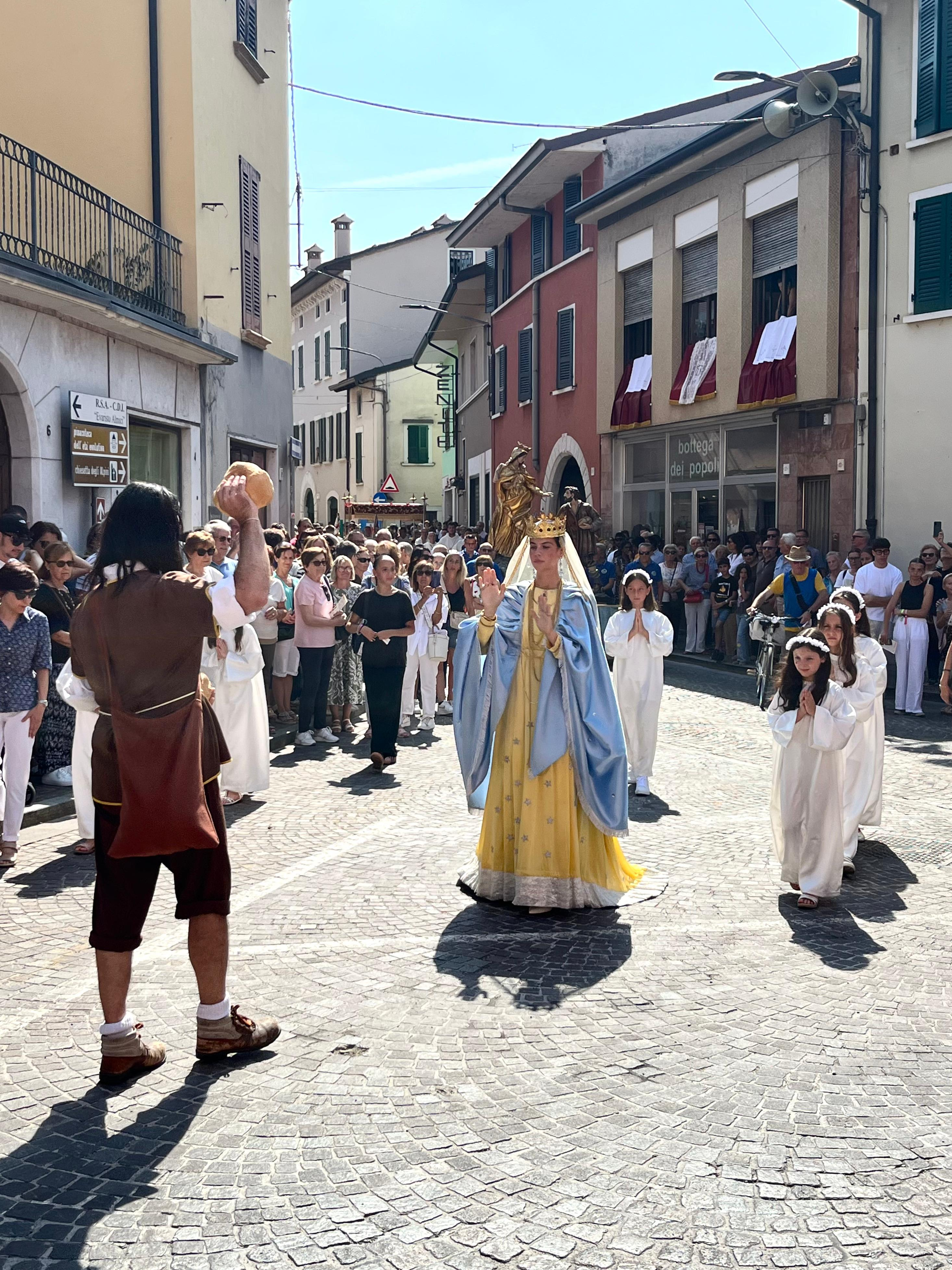

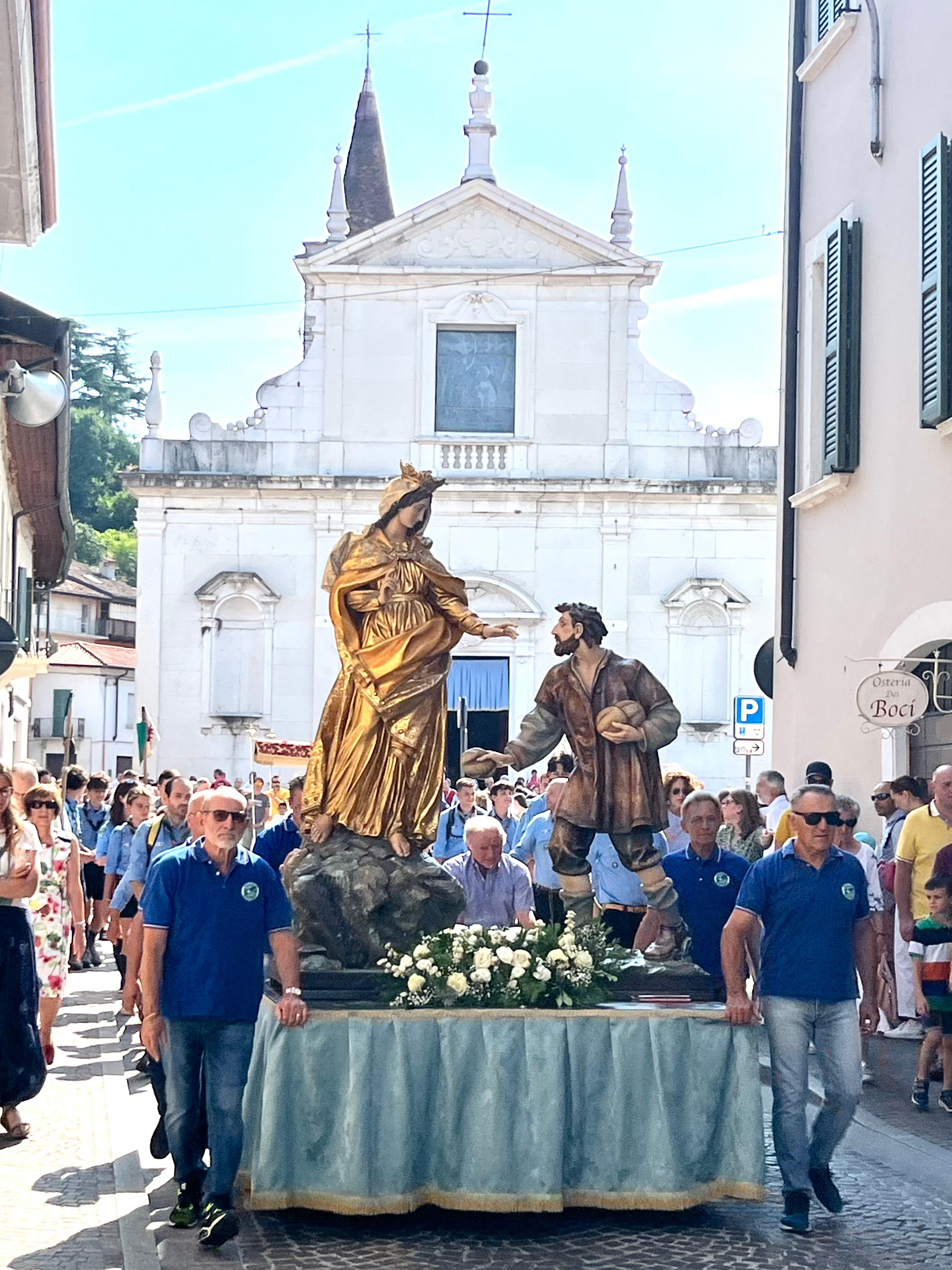

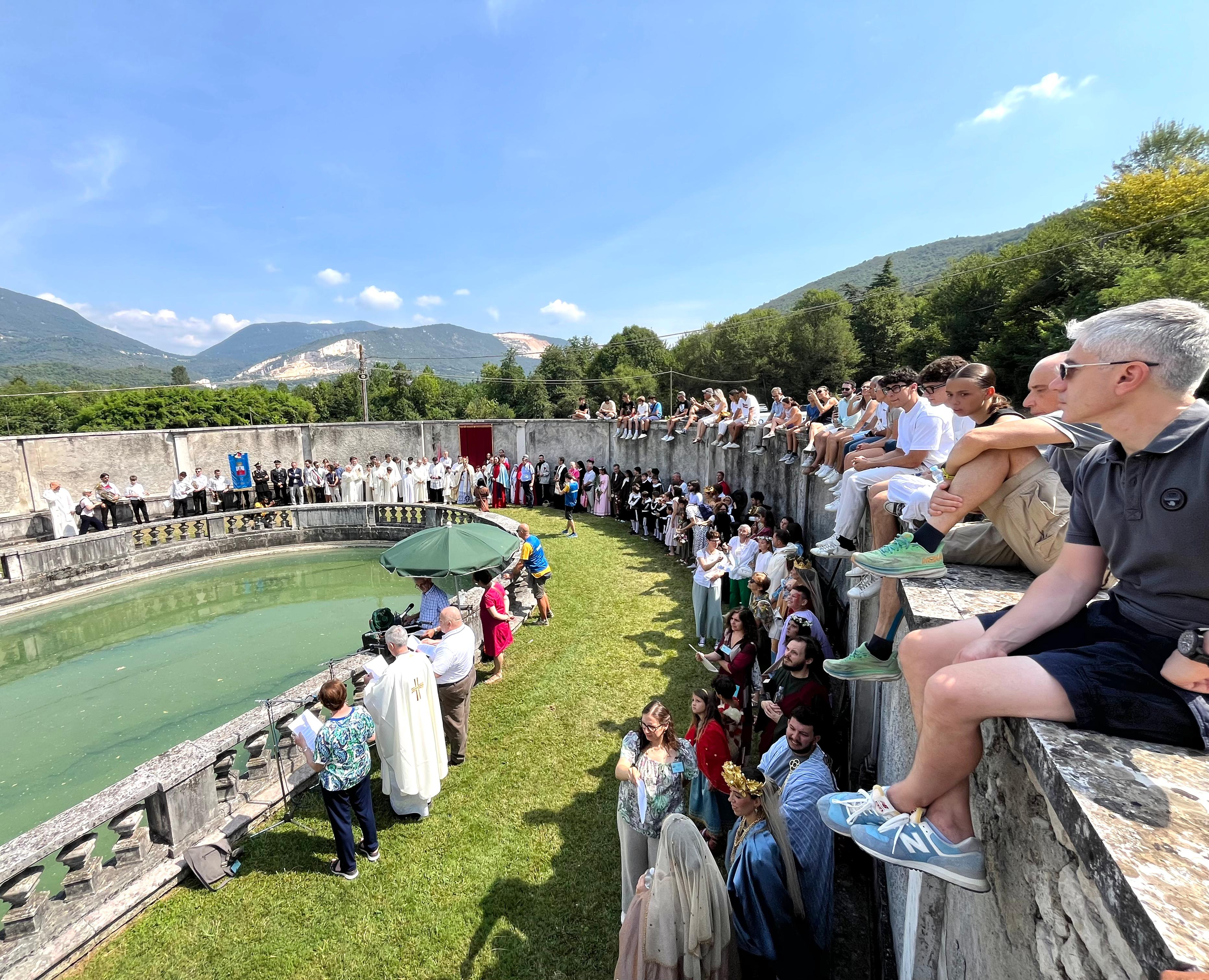

==== St. James church ====
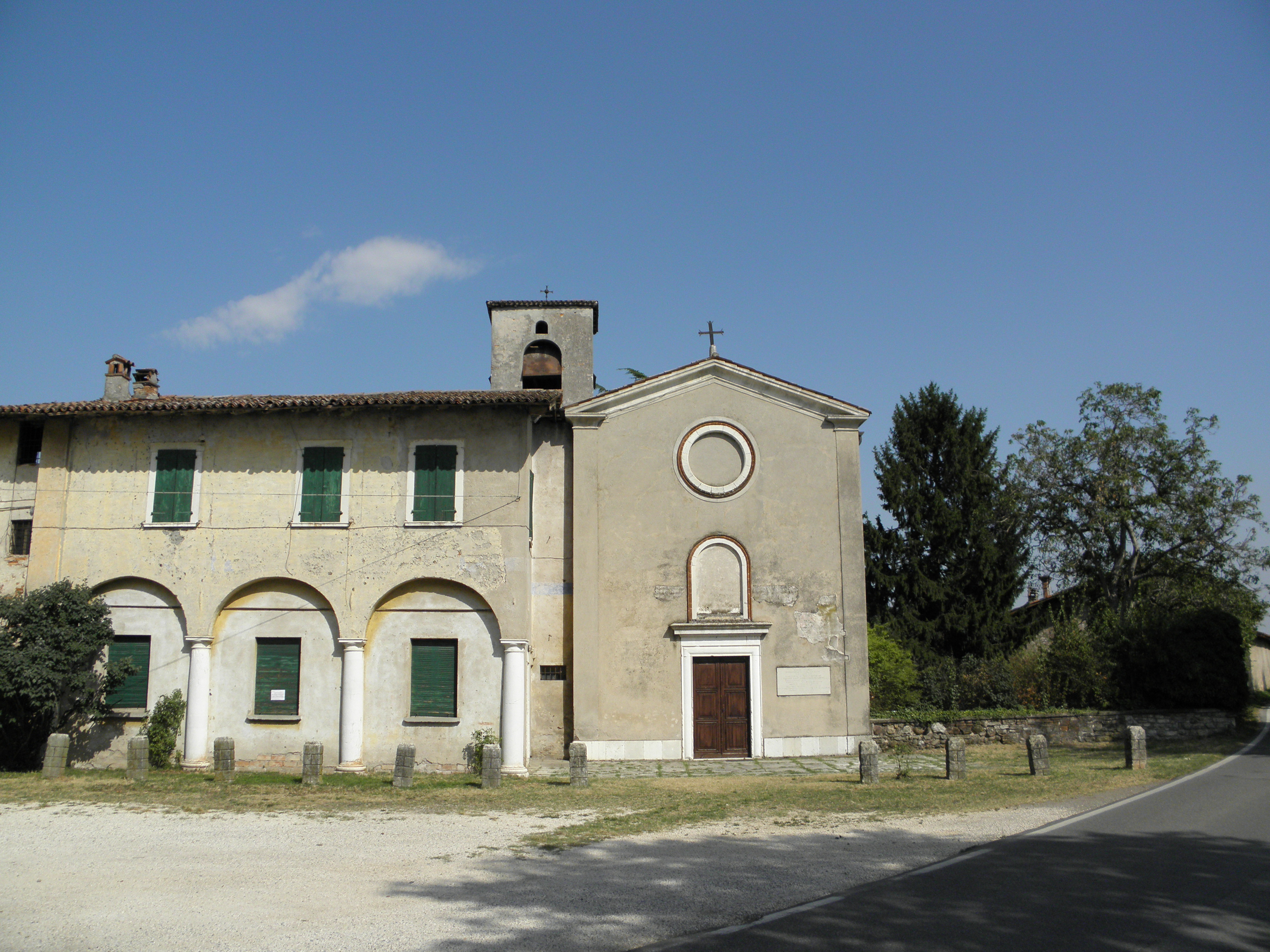
St. James church (1122).

Alongside the Sanctuary of Our Lady of Valverde, this small church represents a significant symbol of medieval Christian worship in Rezzato. Erected in 1122, the structure was originally located in the open countryside of the southern part of the municipality. Situated along a major pilgrimage route to Rome, it functioned as an inn and refuge for pilgrims. Travelers at the site were frequently targeted by a band of highwaymen based in the neighboring town of Castenedolo. Due to this persistent looting, Pope Innocent II issued a papal decree in 1132 excommunicating anyone who desecrated the church or its hospice.

During the 15th century, a large cascina a corte (courtyard farmstead) was constructed around the church. The complex grew into a significant rural community; until the 1960s, more than 300 people resided there. Every Sunday, a priest from the town would travel to the estate to celebrate Mass for the local inhabitants.

==== The Franciscan monastery on St. Peter's Hill ====
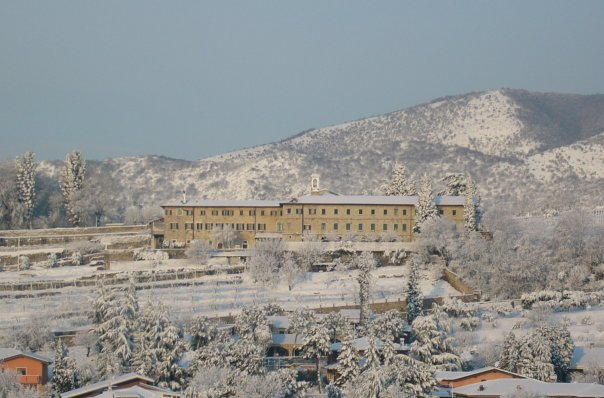
The Franciscan monastery in winter.

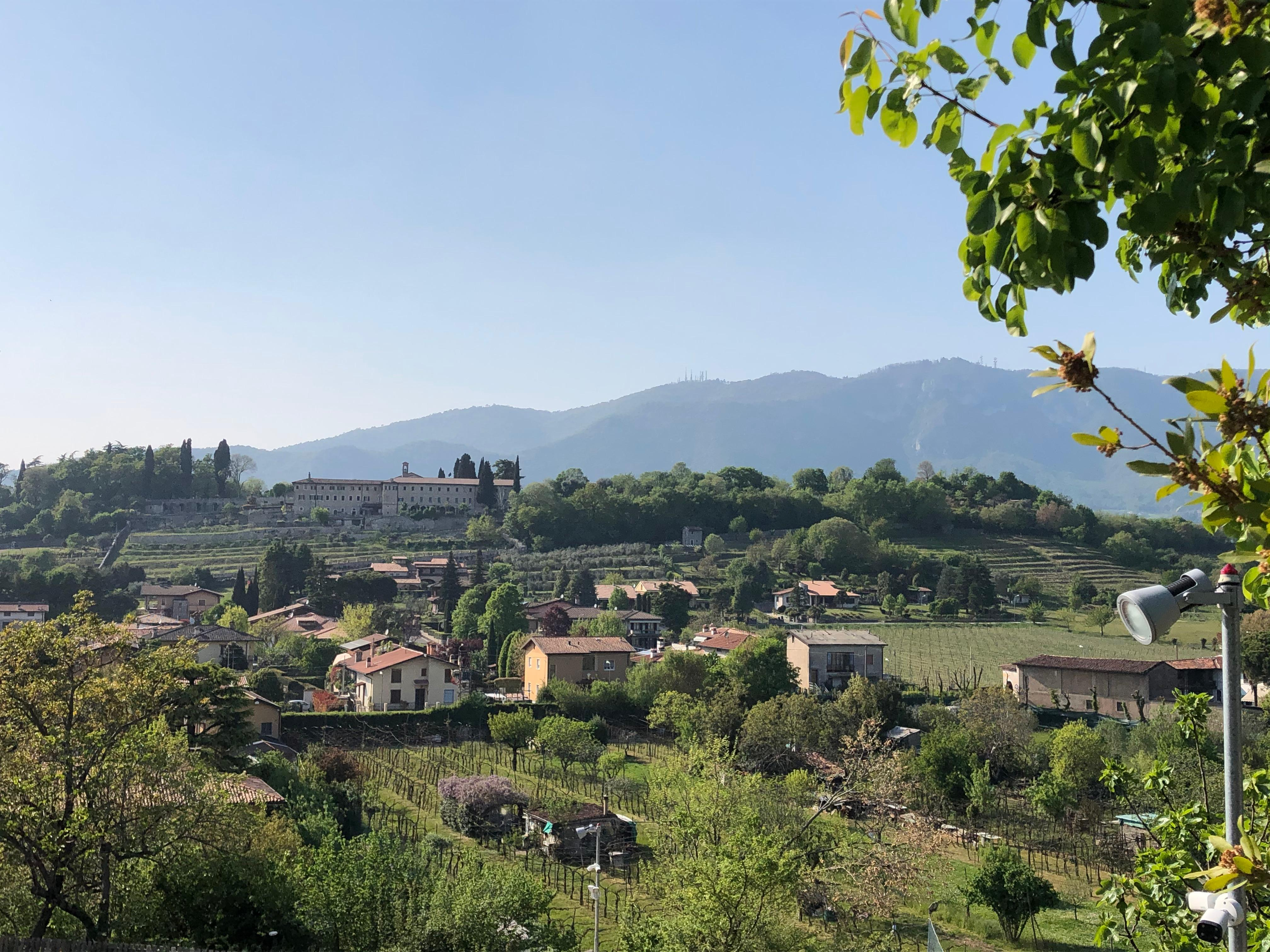
The Franciscan monastery in early spring.

The concept of erecting a Capuchin monastery on St. Peter's Hill (Italian: Colle di San Pietro) was first proposed in 1570. Backed by the local clergy, the Capuchin Franciscan monks initiated the construction the same year. Following approval from neighboring municipalities, formal requests were submitted to the Superiors of the Capuchin Order on 4 October and 22 November 1570, offering the Church of St. Peter on the Hill and its surrounding land for the monastery's establishment. Completed and inhabited by a few friars in 1572, the monastery began hosting an established religious community in 1587 under its first guardian, Father Crescenzio da Brescia, who managed the estate until 1594. The monastery became a hub for highly educated friars, authors of ascetic works, and prominent preachers.

The 1606 interdict issued by the Republic of Venice forced the friars into exile in Parma. During the plague of 1630, the community provided heroic assistance to those afflicted by the epidemic. In 1693, the Municipality of Rezzato granted the Capuchins permission to construct a new lateral chapel on the northern side of the church.

Having become inadequate and dilapidated, the monastery underwent extensive expansion during the 18th century. A large refectory and adjacent workshops were constructed in 1727. Two years later, the cells located above the refectory on the eastern side were renovated. Further cells and a library were constructed on the southern and northern sides in 1744. The large cistern at the center of the cloister—which preserved the ancient structure of the porticoes supported by eight stone pillars holding up the roofs on all four sides—was erected in 1747 through the financial backing of a local Count, whose commemorative epitaph was carved into the stone.

The monastery was suppressed by the Cisalpine Republic in 1798. Although it reopened in 1799 due to the demands of the local clergy and populace following the arrival of Austro-Russian forces, it was closed again in 1800 by the Second Cisalpine Republic. The complex was subsequently purchased by Gabrio Maria Nava, the Bishop of Brescia, in an attempt to establish a religious community or at least a chaplaincy there. The monastery was allowed to reopen via a government decree on 6 August 1836 and a papal indult on 17 March 1837, hosting the Reformed Franciscan Friars Minor. On 15 July 1837, the monastery officially reopened.

However, Italian suppression laws on 7 July 1866 and 16 July 1868 forced the friars to abandon Rezzato once again. The religious community safely reopened on 4 October 1869. Subsequent expansions followed, including the construction of a guesthouse in 1882. A small plaque next to a cross outside the monastery commemorates the firm determination of Edoardo Gemelli (later Father Agostino Gemelli) to remain in the novitiate in 1903.

The quiet life of the friars was briefly interrupted during World War I: from 7 May to 29 October 1917, the military garrison requisitioned nine rooms to use as a military prison, and on 30 October, 200 soldiers were quartered on the property.

The friars left the monastery in 2022, allowing Franciscan nuns to establish a new religious community.

The monastery preserves a highly significant library containing over 10,000 volumes, 66 incunabula, 71 codices or manuscripts, and 8 illuminated parchment choir books featuring decorative borders.

==== Other churches ====
Other major religious buildings in Rezzato are:

- St. John the Baptist church, which serves as the parish church of Rezzato;
- Sts. Peter and Paul church, which serves as the parish church of Virle Treponti;
- St. Charles chapel, built in 1580 during Carlo Borromeo's visit to the town;
- Alpini's chapel, built in 1961;
- St. Charles church, built in 1967;
- St. Joseph church, built in 1982.
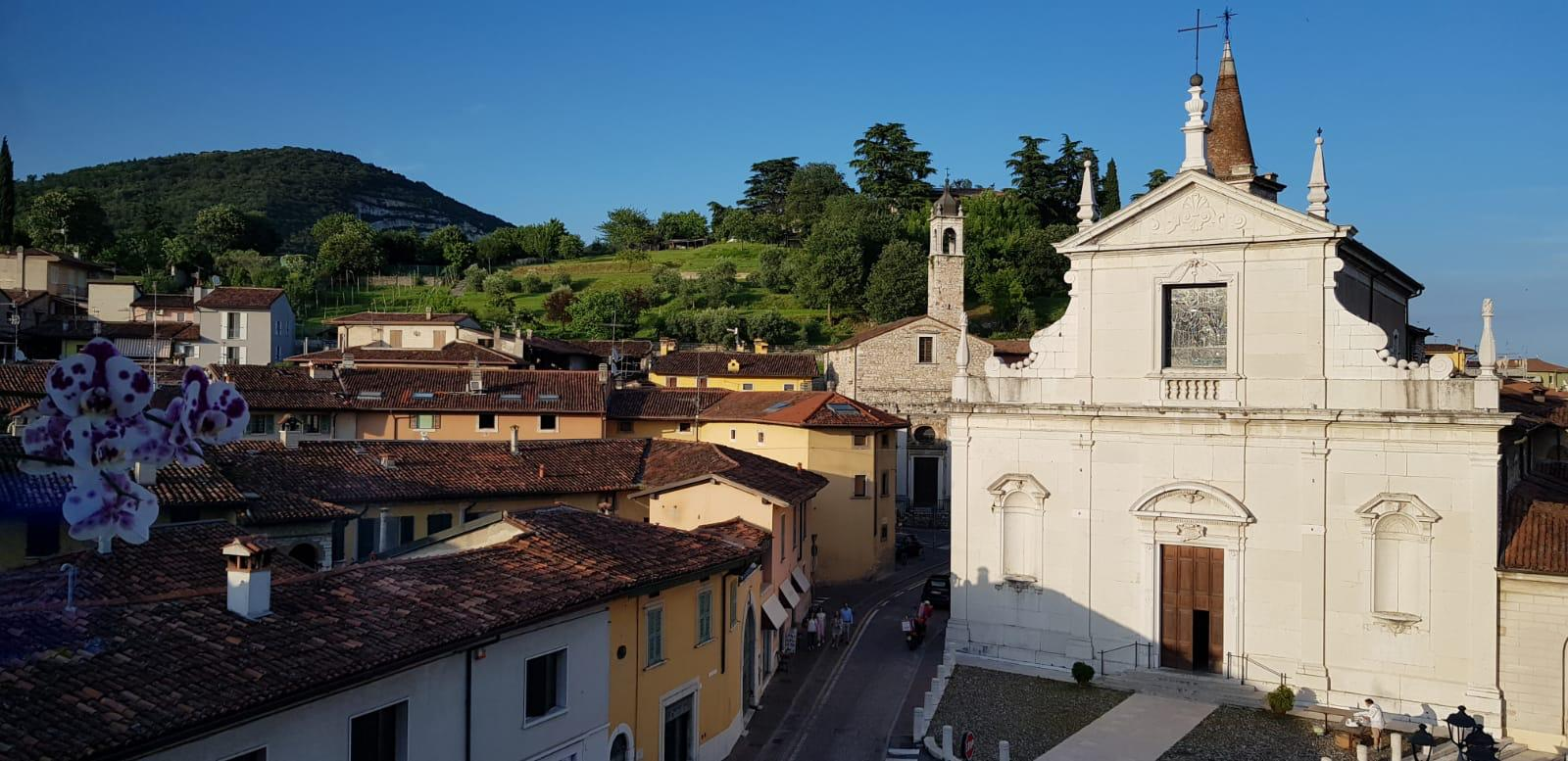
St. John the Baptist church in the town centre

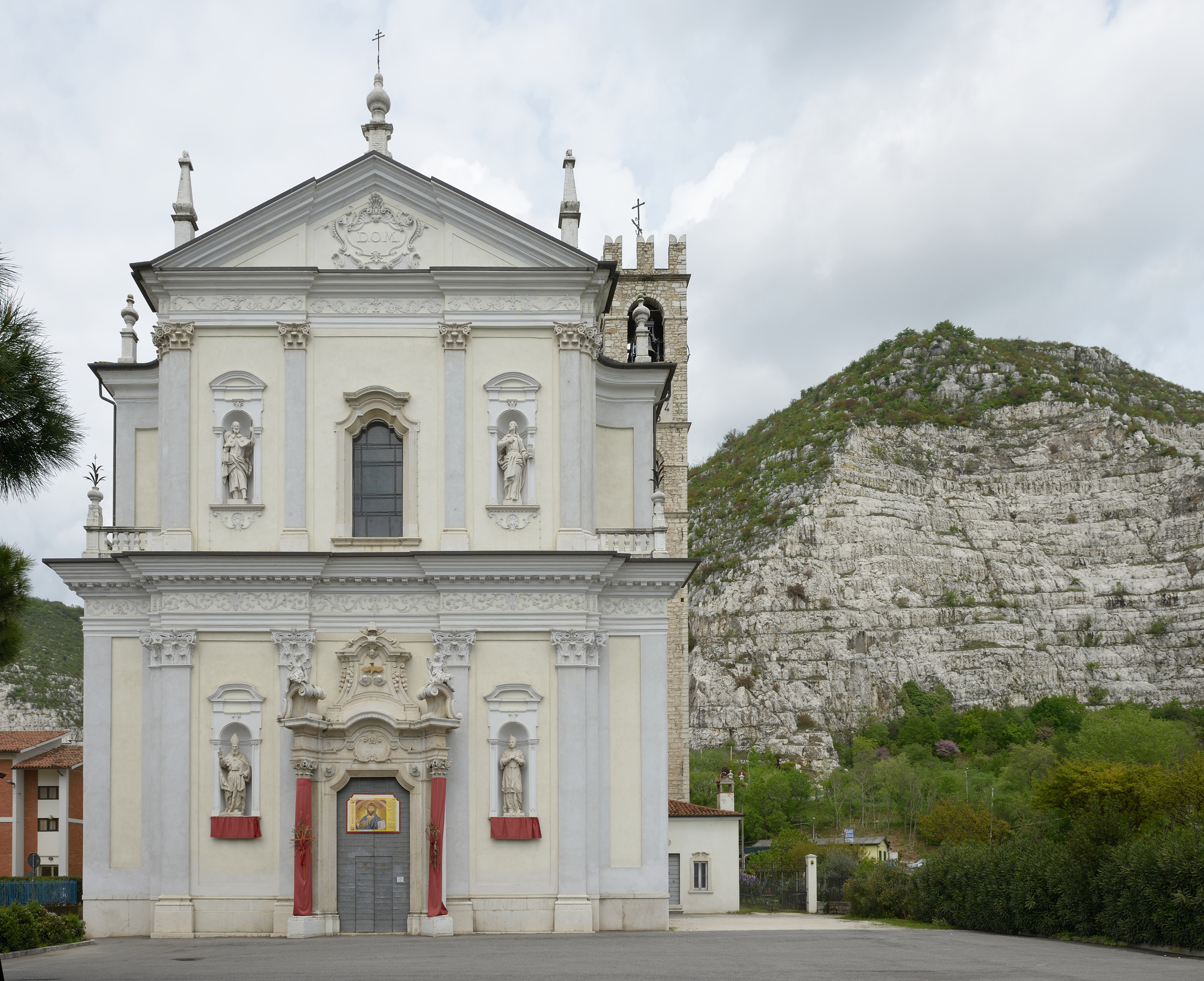
Sts. Peter and Paul church in Virle

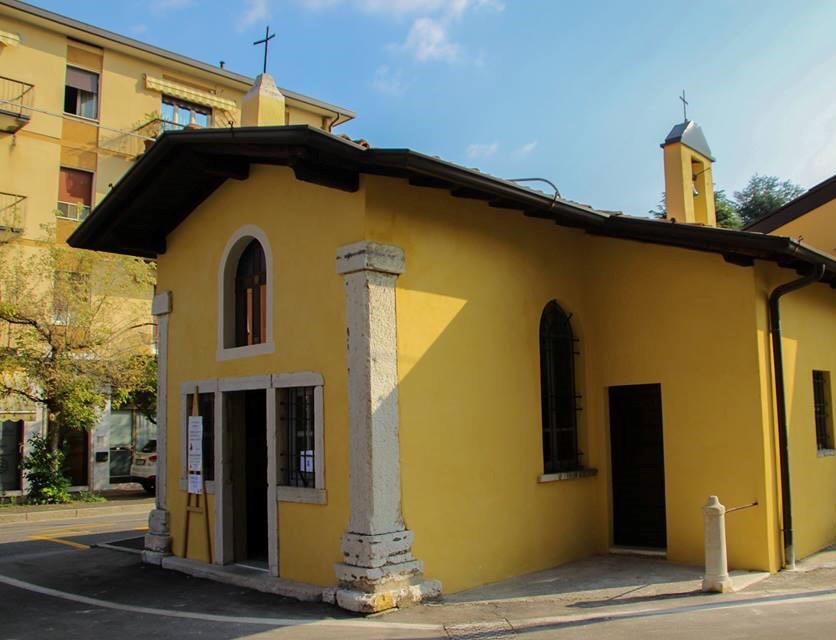
St. Charles chapel

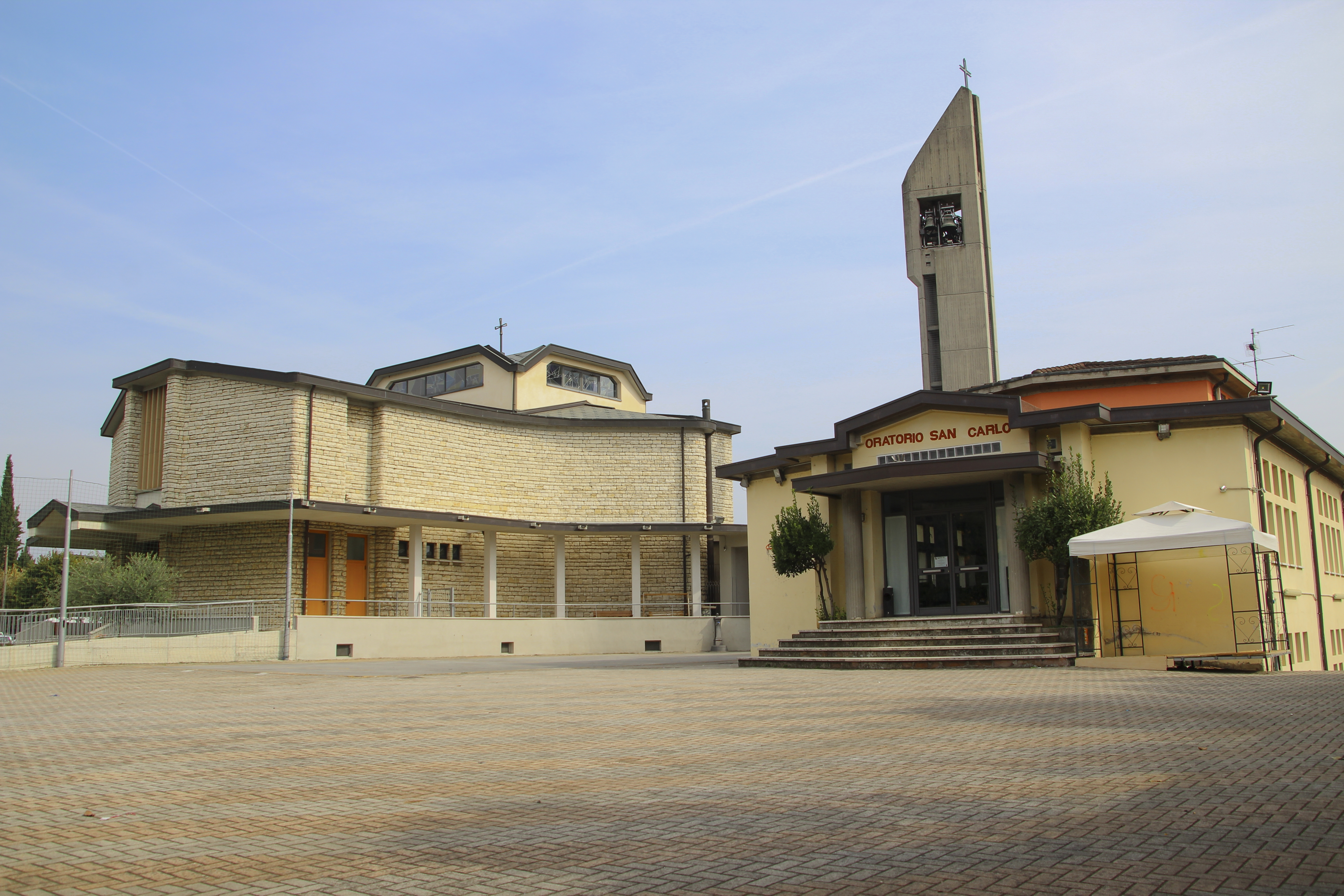
St. Charles church

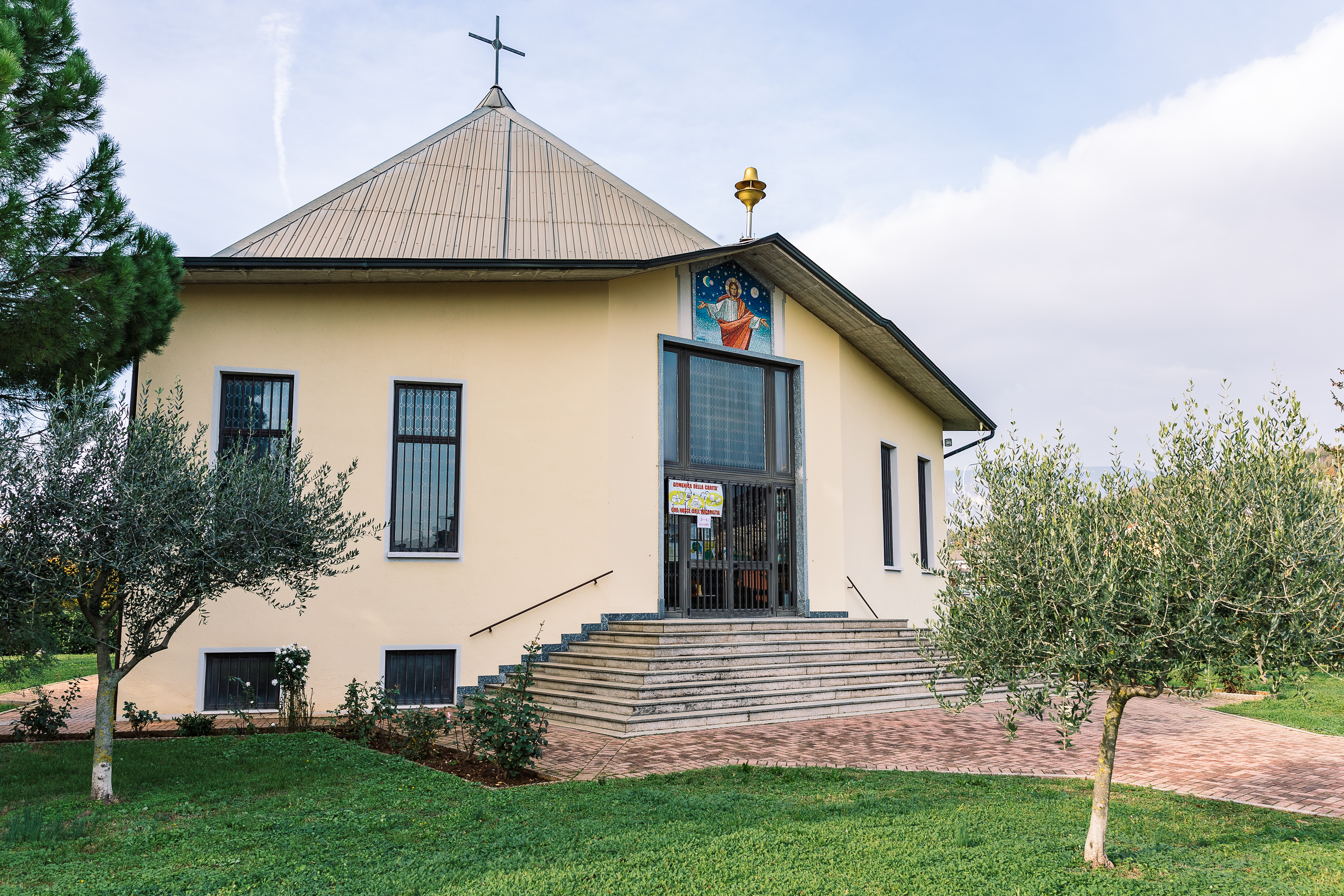
St. Joseph church

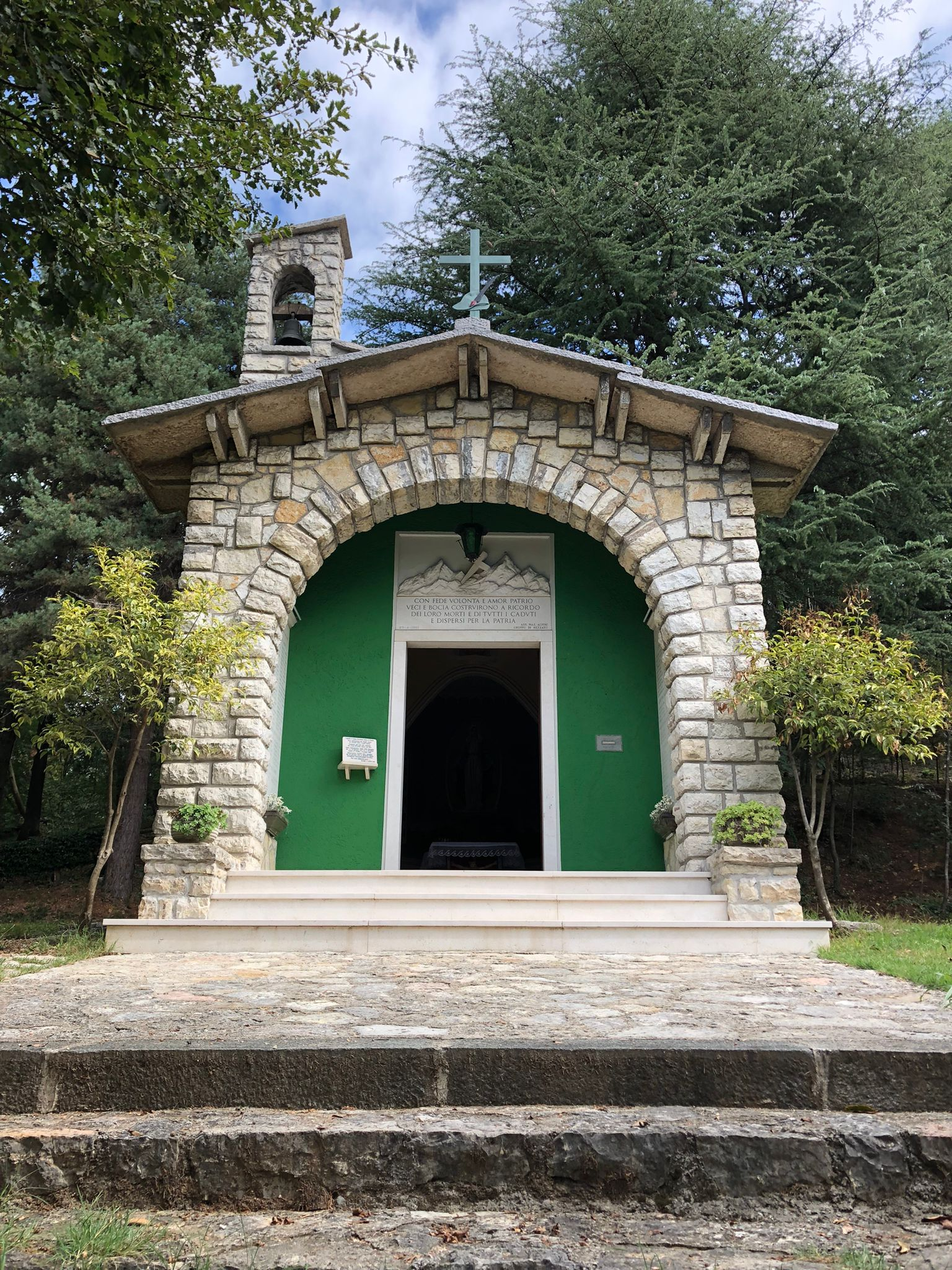
Alpini's chapel

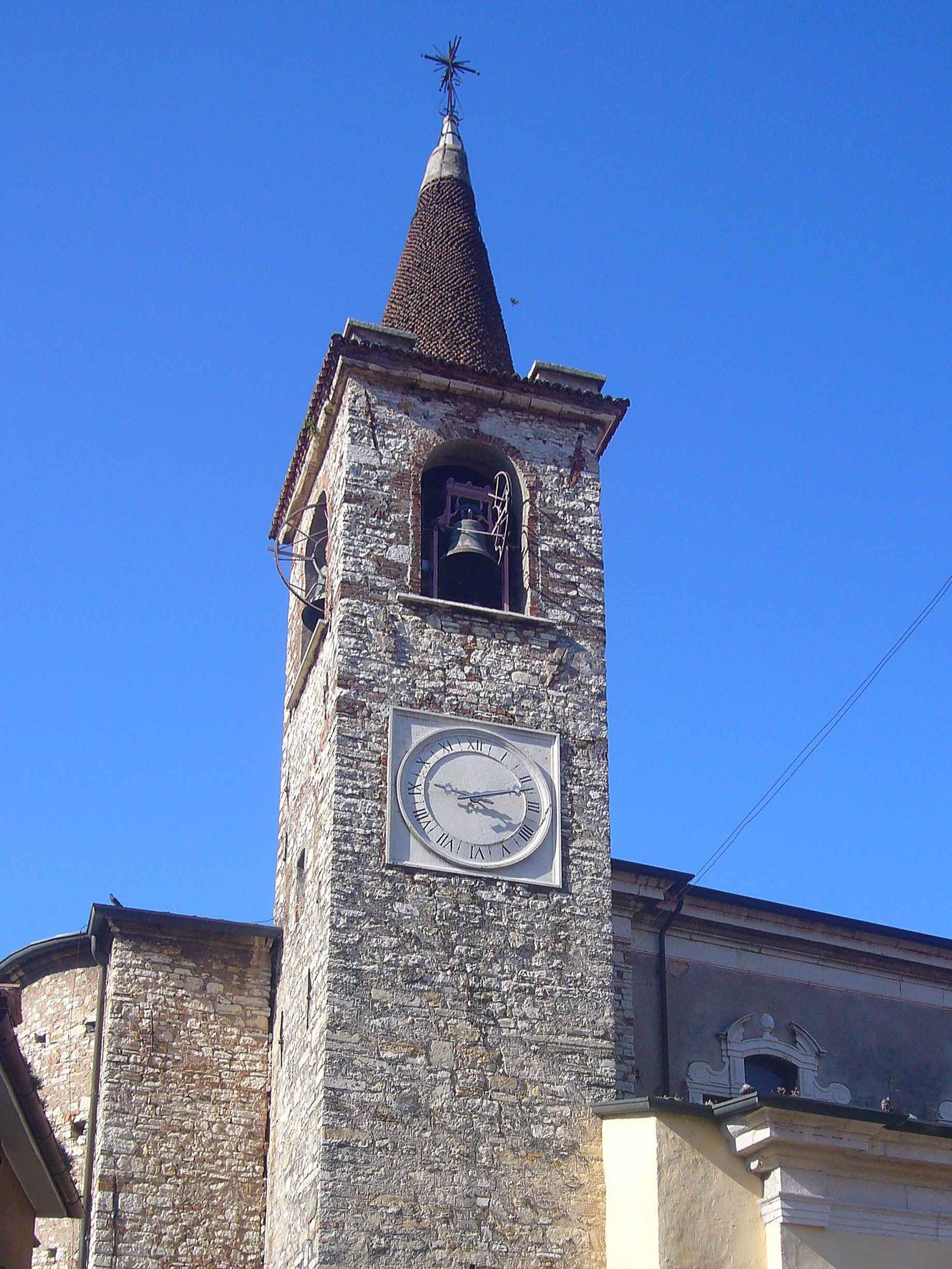
St. John's bell tower

== Transportation ==
The A4 motorway passes south of the town, while Route SS 11, the Padana Superiore road, and Route SS 45bis, the Gardesana Occidentale road, lead directly to Rezzato.

The nearest train station to Rezzato is in Brescia (the train station of Rezzato was active until mid-1990s), on the Milan-Venice railway line. The nearest airport is in Montichiari (8 km).

The town was connected to Brescia, Salò and Lake Garda by a tramway from 1887 to 1954 and by a train line from 1897 to 1967.

In the town there are about 7 km of cycling paths. Rezzato is also connected to the Lake Garda by the Rezzato-Vobarno cycling route.

== Education and services ==
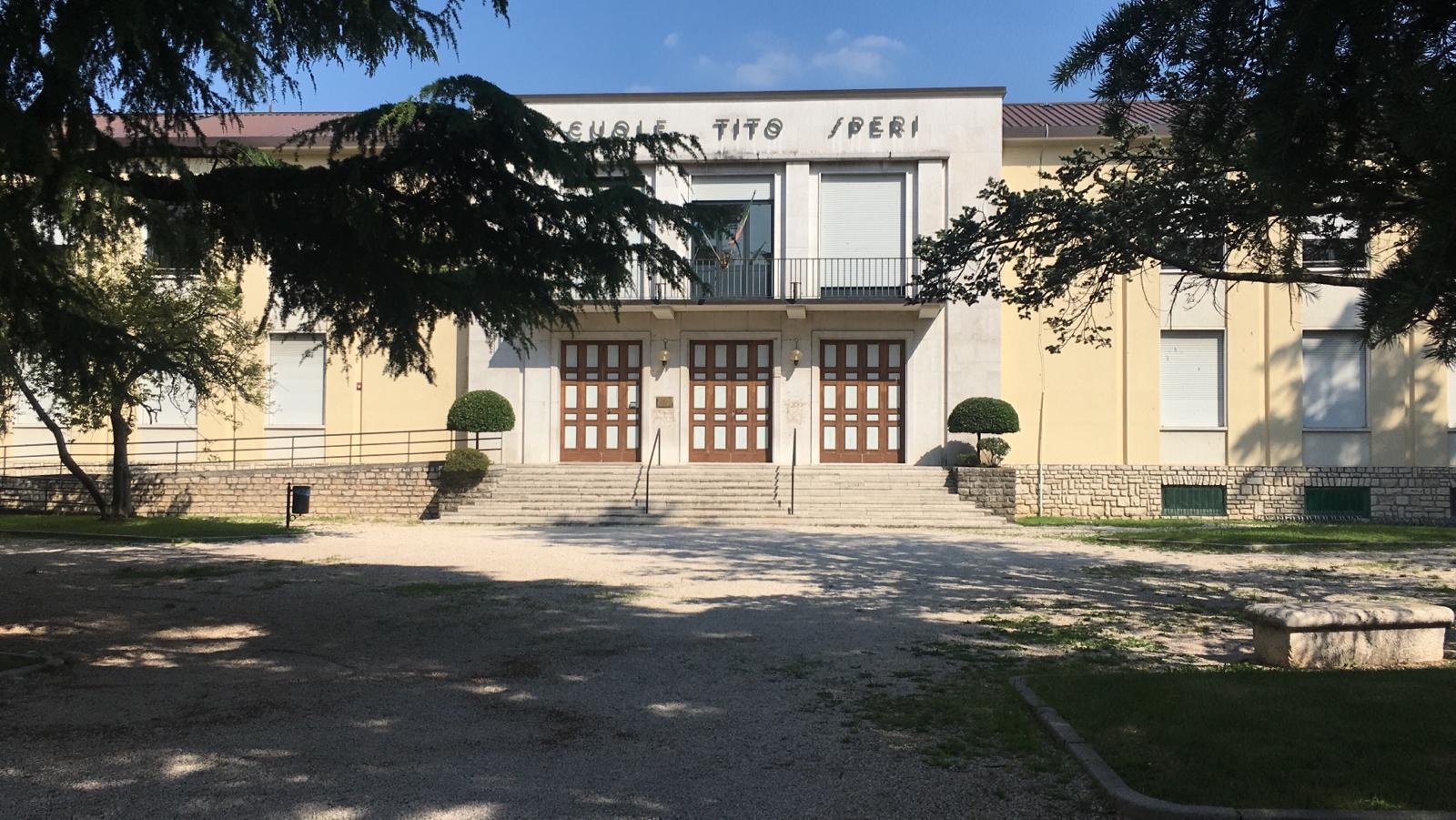
"Tito Speri" elementary school.

In Rezzato there are:

- one public nursery school;
- four public pre-education schools;
- three public elementary schools;
- one public secondary school.

The town is also provided with a vocational institute, hosted in the ancient "Rodolfo Vantini" School (School of Arts and Professional Instruction), which offers also a course in marble sculpture.

The central public library of Rezzato is the biggest of the eastern area of the Province and it's the center of a system of 22 libraries seated in different municipalities.

Since 1936 Rezzato has a public theatre and a cinema, renamed CTM (Cinema, Theatre, Music) in 1978.

== Sister cities ==
Rezzato is twinned with:

- Bogoroditsk, Tula Oblast, Russia (since 26 October 2007).

== Gallery ==
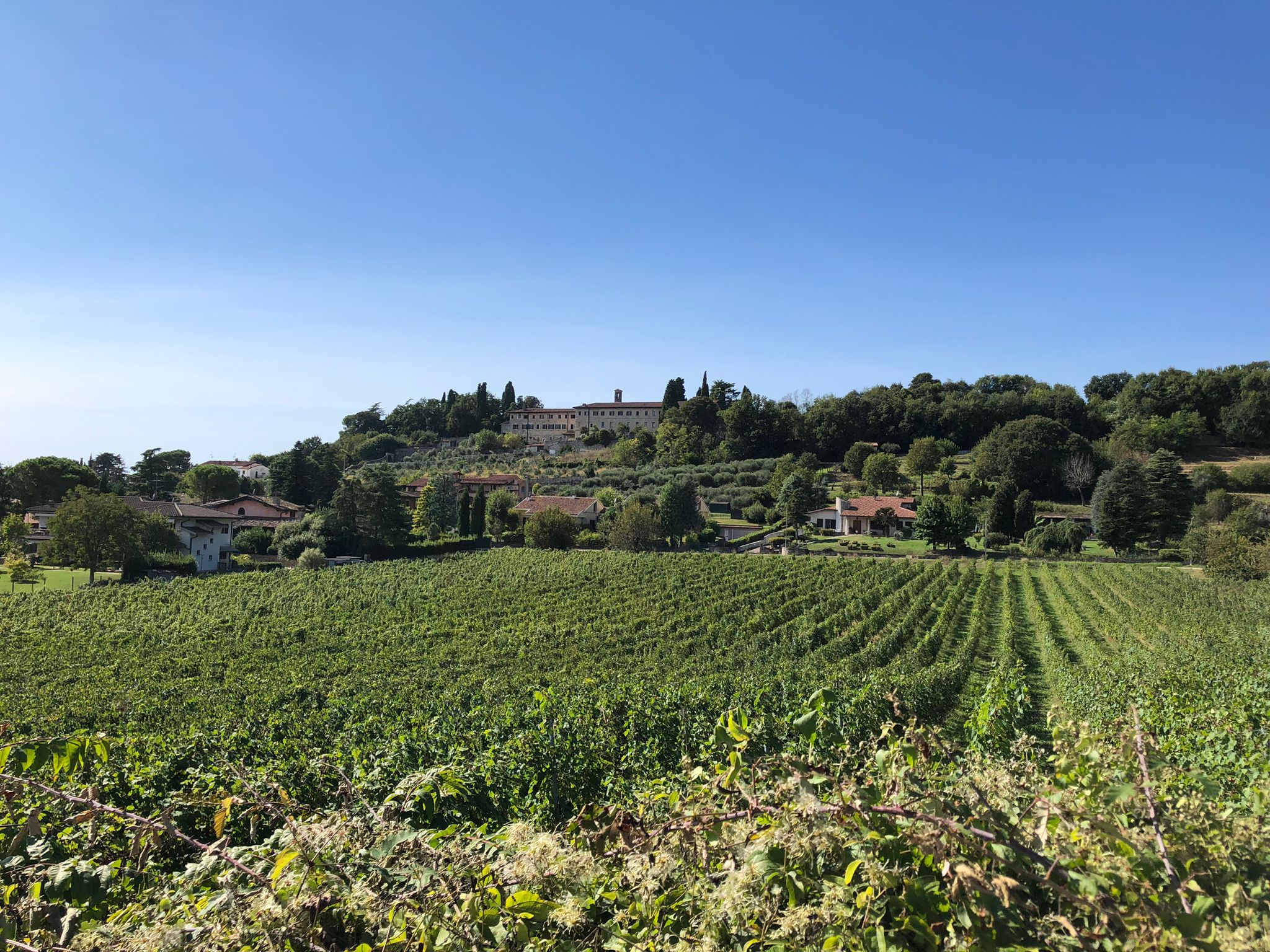
Vineyards in Rezzato with the monastery in the background

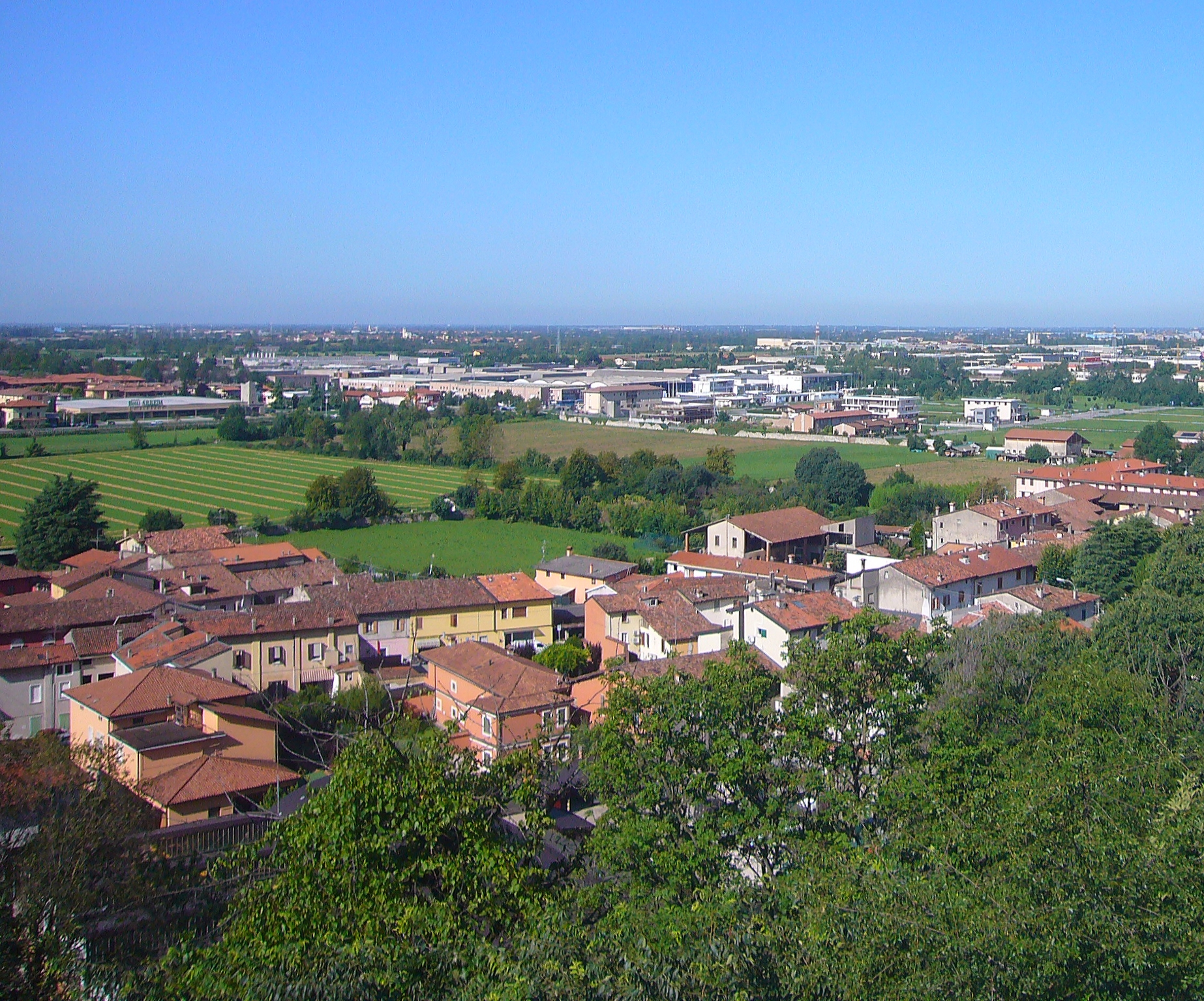
Part of the town centre seen from Bacchus' Gardens

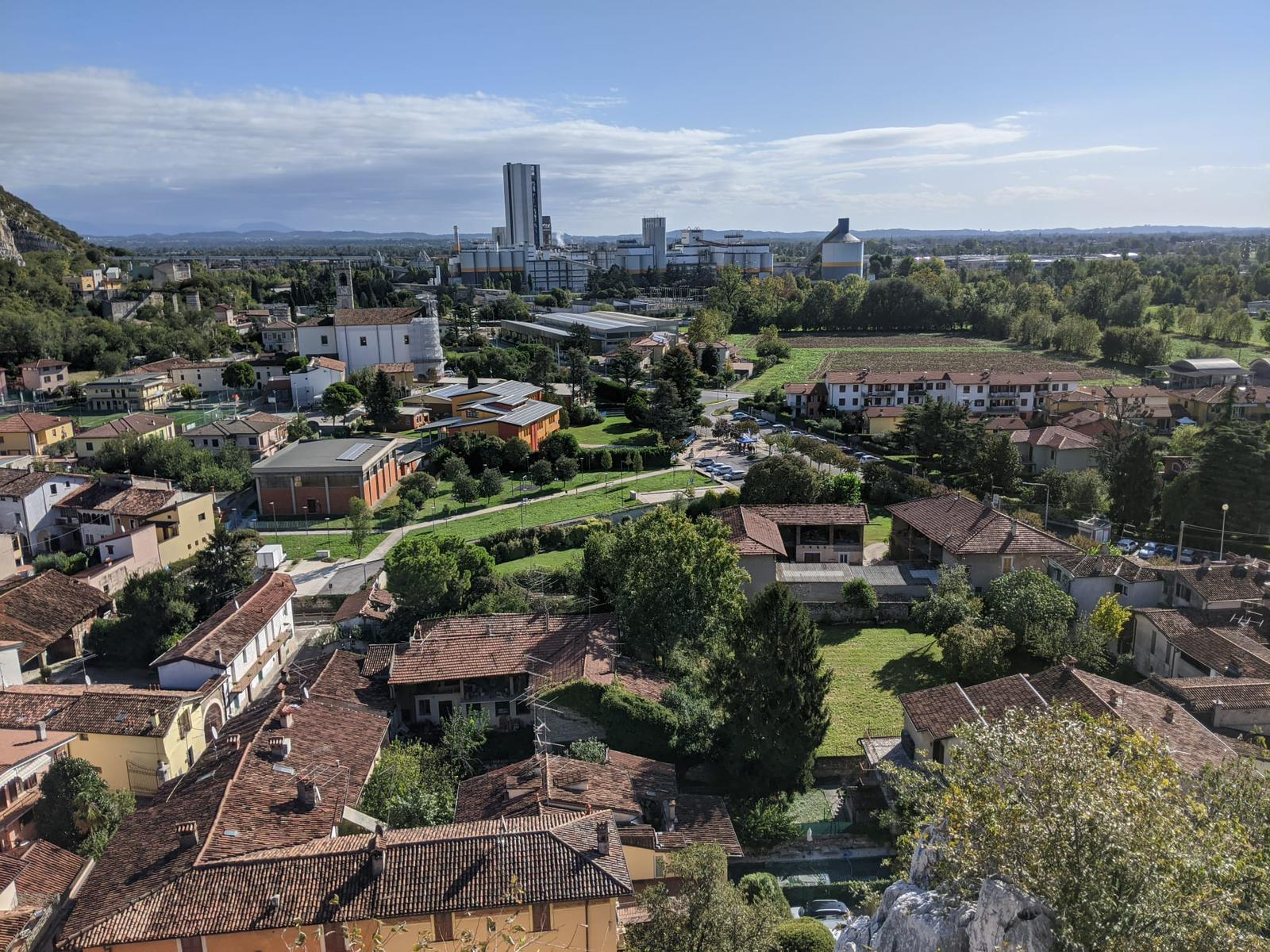
Virle Treponti town center

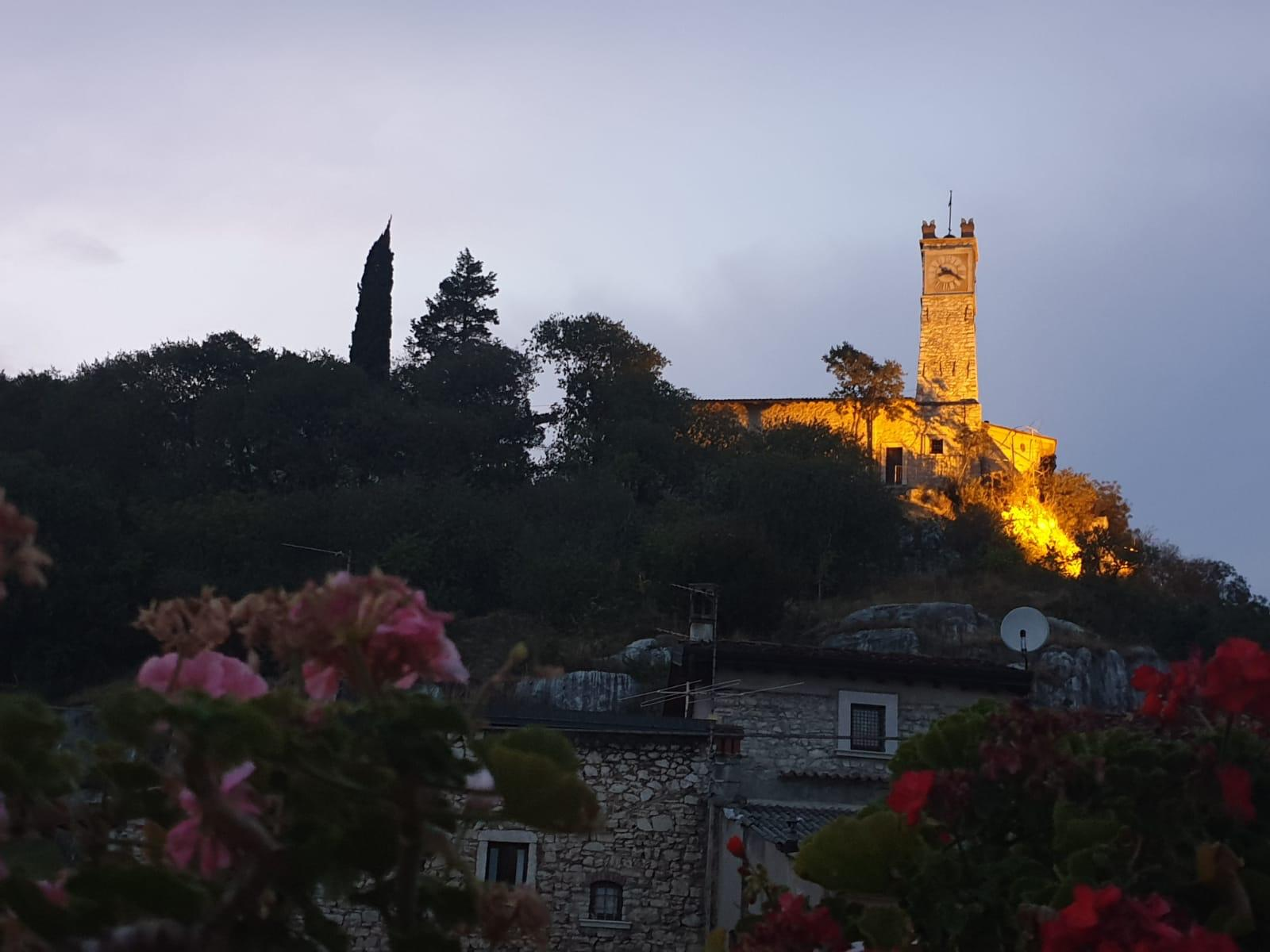
St. Martin church in Virle

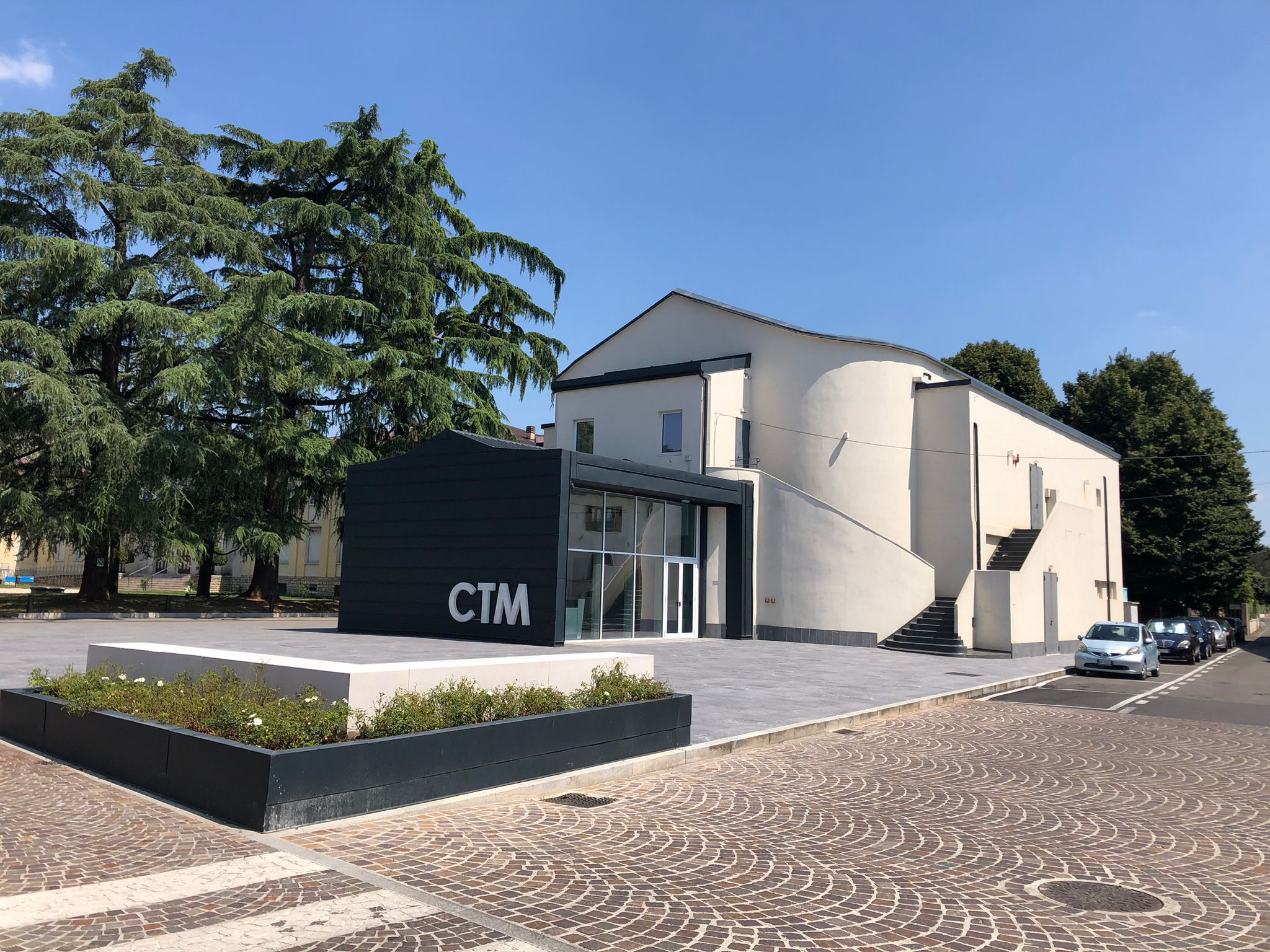
CTM public theatre

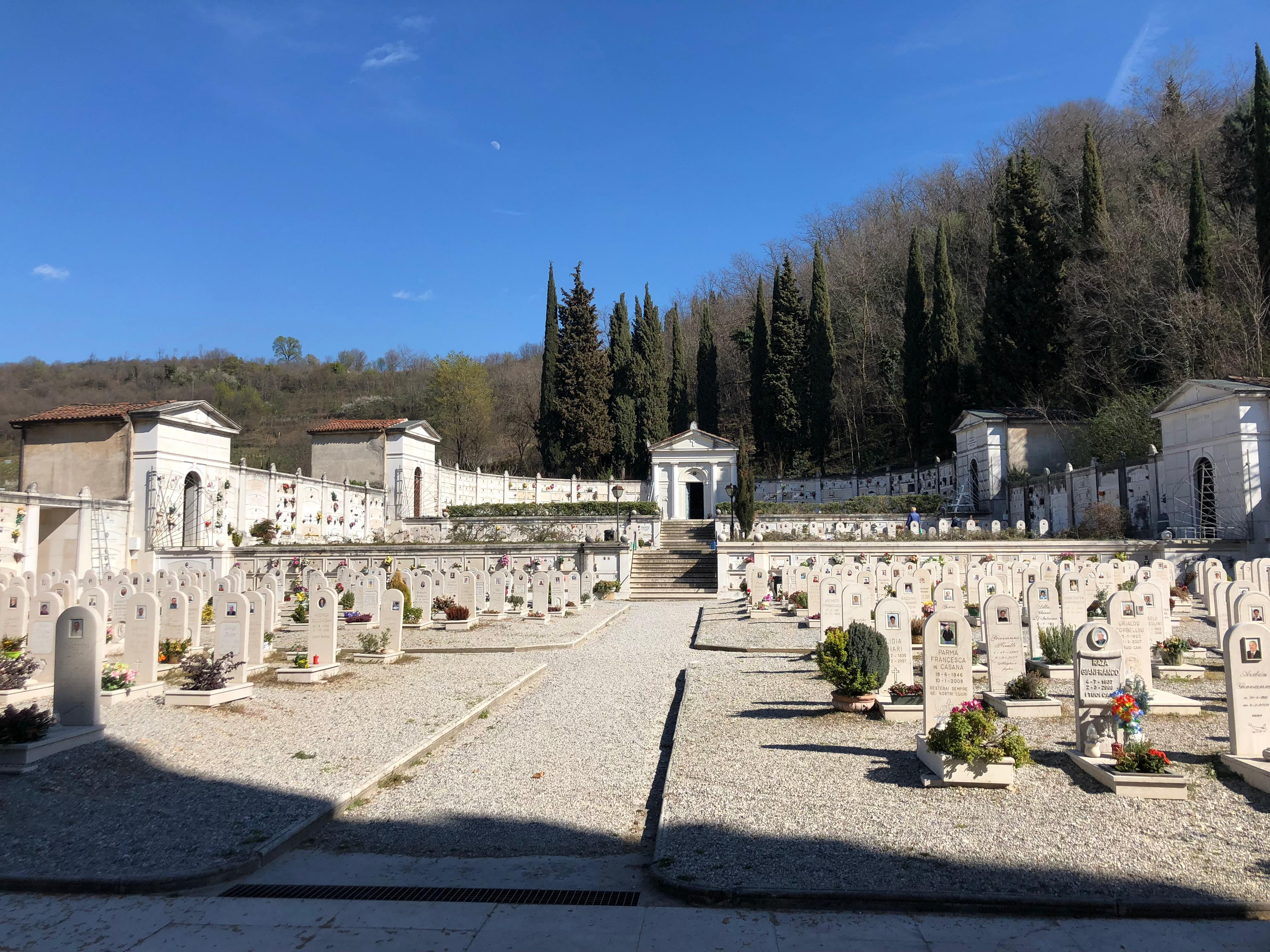
The cemetery designed by Rodolfo Vantini

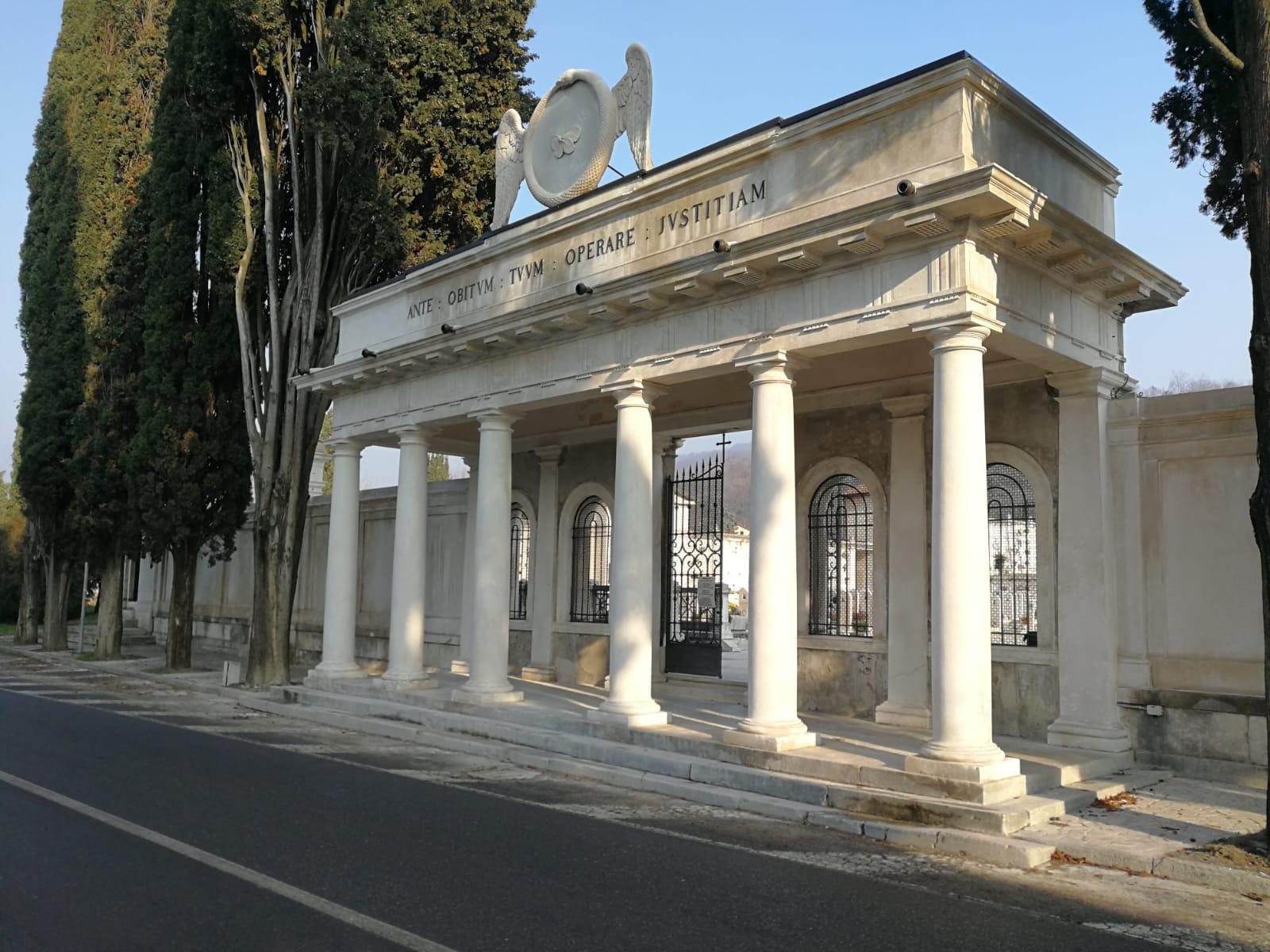
The cemetery main entrance

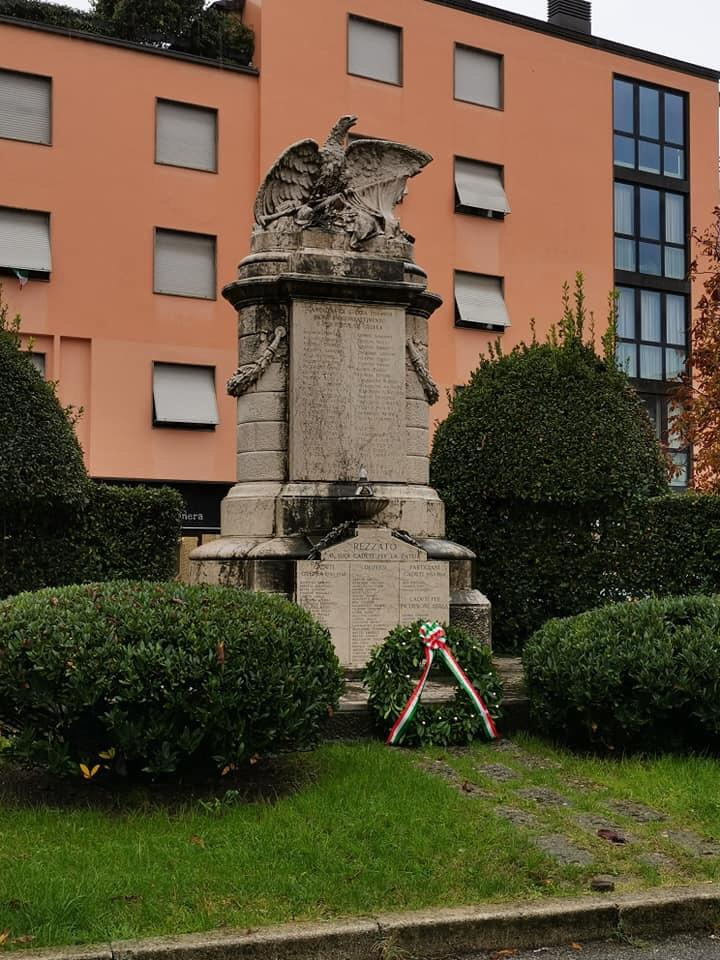
Monument to the fallen soldiers (1921)
