= 52nd Infantry Regiment "Alpi" =

Inactive Italian Army infantry unit

- 52° Reggimento Fanteria "Alpi"
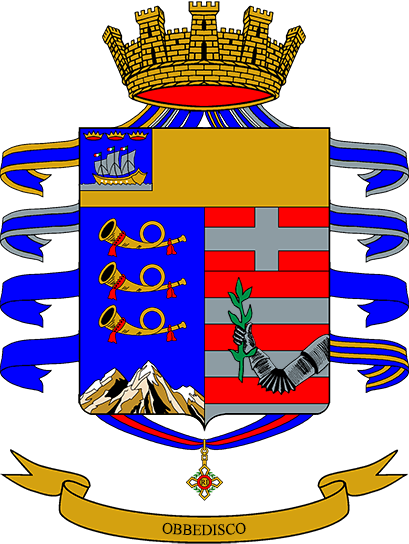
- Regimental coat of arms
- Active: 17 March 1859 – 8 Sept. 1943; 1 July 1958 – 31 Aug. 1996
- Country: Italy
- Branch: Italian Army
- Part of: 5th Army Corps
- Garrison/HQ: Portogruaro
- Motto: "Obbedisco"
- Anniversaries: 20 September 1912 – Battle of Sidi Bilal
- Decorations: 1× Military Order of Italy; 1× Gold Medal of Military Valor; 3× Silver Medals of Military Valor; 3× Bronze Medals of Military Valor; 1× Bronze Medal of Army Valor

Insignia
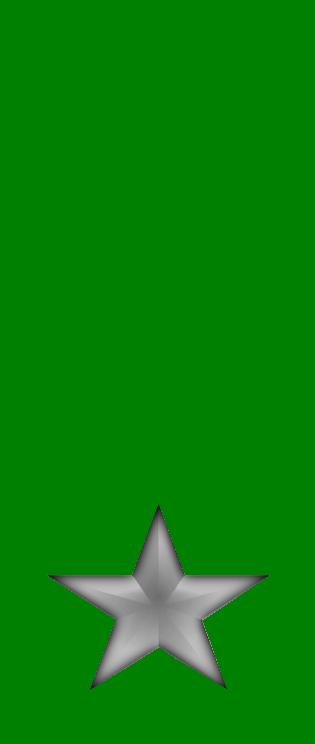
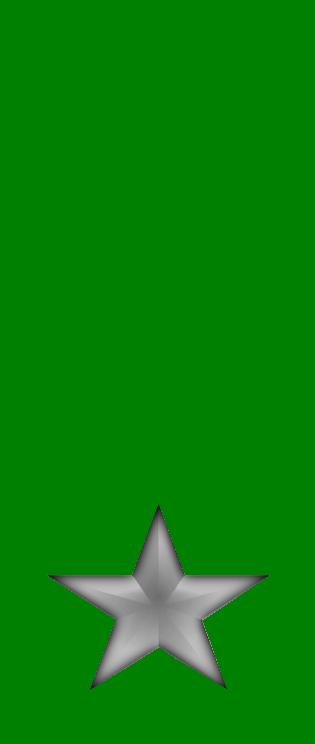
- Regimental gorget patches

The 52nd Infantry Regiment "Alpi" (Italian: 52° Reggimento Fanteria "Alpi") is an inactive unit of the Italian Army last based in Portogruaro. The regiment carries the traditions of Giuseppe Garibaldi's Hunters of the Alps (Italian: Cacciatori delle Alpi), which were formed in spring 1859 for the Second Italian War of Independence. In September 1859, the five Cacciatori delle Alpi regiments were merged into two regiments and integrated into the Royal Sardinian Army's infantry arm. In 1866, the 52nd Infantry Regiment "Alpi" participated in the Third Italian War of Independence. In 1911–12 the regiment fought in the Italo-Turkish War. During World War I, the regiment fought on the Italian front and then on the Western Front. Before the outbreak of World War II, the regiment was assigned to the 22nd Infantry Division "Cacciatori delle Alpi", with which it fought in the Greco-Italian War and was then sent to occupied Yugoslavia as occupation force. After the announcement of the Armistice of Cassibile on 8 September 1943 the division and its regiments were disbanded by invading German forces.

In 1958 the regiment was reformed in Cuneo as a training unit. In 1964 the regiment was reorganized and moved to Tarcento, where it was tasked with maintaining and manning fortifications of the Alpine Wall on the border with Yugoslavia. In 1976 the regiment was disbanded and its flag and traditions assigned to the 52nd Infantry Fortification Battalion "Alpi", which was assigned to the Mechanized Brigade "Isonzo". On 31 March 1993, the battalion was disbanded and the next day reformed in Portogruaro as training unit of the 5th Army Corps. On 31 August 1996, the battalion was disbanded. The regiment's anniversary falls on 20 September 1912, the day of the Battle of Sidi Bilal in Libya, during which the regiment distinguished itself and was awarded Italy's highest military honor a Gold Medal of Military Valor.

== History ==
=== Formation ===
On 28 January 1859, the French Empire and the Kingdom of Sardinia signed a secret treaty of alliance against the Austrian Empire, which led to the Second Italian War of Independence. In preparation for the war the Royal Sardinian Army began to form new units. On 20 February 1859, a depot was formed in Cuneo, which trained volunteers arriving from the Austrian Kingdom of Lombardy–Venetia and Trentino, the Papal Legations, the Duchy of Modena and Reggio, and the Duchy of Parma and Piacenza. On 17 March 1859, Giuseppe Garibaldi assumed command of the Cacciatori delle Alpi Corps. On the same date the depot in Cuneo formed the 1st Regiment Cacciatori delle Alpi, whose commanding officer was Enrico Cosenz. Also on the same date a depot was formed in Acqui, which was tasked with training volunteers arriving from the Grand Duchy of Tuscany and the central Italian Papal Legations. On 20 March 1859, a third depot was formed in Savigliano. On 7 April 1859, the depot in Savigliano formed the 2nd Regiment Cacciatori delle Alpi, whose commanding officer was Giacomo Medici. On 17 April 1859, the depot in Acqui formed the Regiment Cacciatori degli Appennini.

=== Second Italian War of Independence ===
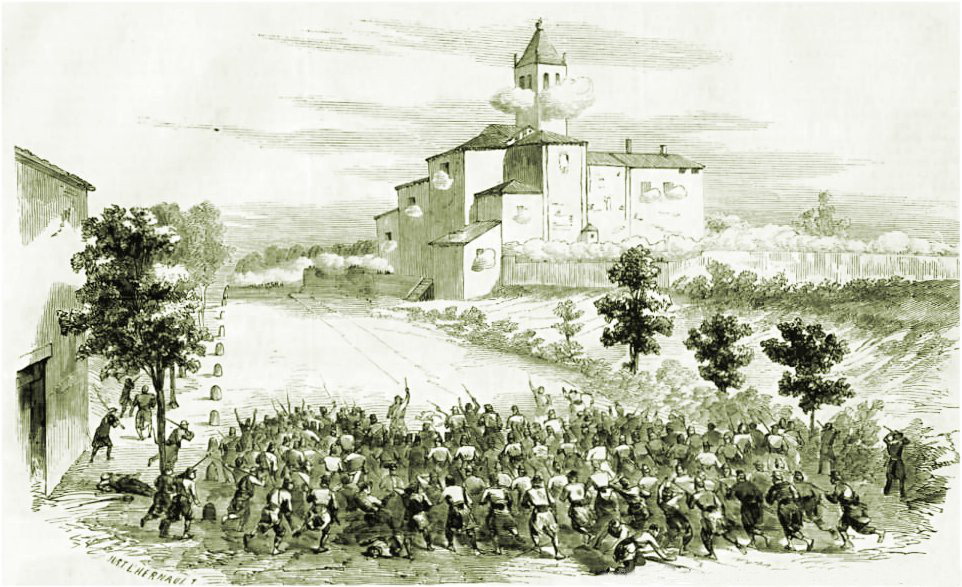
Garibaldi's Cacciatori delle Alpi during the Battle of San Fermo

At the outbreak of the war on 26 April the Cacciatori delle Alpi Corps consisted of two regiments and a Horse Guides Squadron. On 4 May 1859, the 3rd Regiment Cacciatori delle Alpi was formed, which on 8 May reached the other two regiments in the field. On 14 May 1859, the corps formed the 1st Bersaglieri Company. On 22 May the corps reached Arona and in the following night, two companies crossed the Ticino river and occupied Sesto Calende in Lombardy. Garibaldi then moved his entire corps into Lombardy, where he occupied Varese. On 26 May 1859, the Cacciatori delle Alpi won the Battle of Varese.

On 27 Mary 1859, Garibaldi began his march to Como and quickly encountered Austrian forces, which led to the Battle of San Fermo. After winning the battle Garibaldi's forces arrived in Como by nightfall. On the same day the depot in Cuneo formed an ambulance unit and a nurses company, and on 30 May the depot formed an artillery battery and a train unit. On 2 June 1859, the Regiment Cacciatori degli Appennini was assigned to the Garibaldi's corps and on the same day French forces commenced the crossing of the Ticino river into Lombardy. On 6 June, the depot in Cuneo formed a Sappers company and the same day Garibaldi, who had embarked his troops in Como on steamships, crossed Lake Como and occupied Lecco. On 8 June Garibaldi's corps arrived in Bergamo and on 14 June in Brescia. On 15 June 1859, the Cacciatori delle Alpi fought and lost the Battle of Treponti.

On 21 June 1859, the corps formed a Youth Battalion with three companies of teenagers. By now the corps had reached the shores of Lake Garda and Garibaldi was ordered to occupy the Valtellina. On 27 June 1859, the corps arrived in the Valtellina and began to move up the valley towards Bormio. On 1 July 1859, the Regiment Cacciatori degli Appennini was renamed 4th Regiment Cacciatori delle Alpi, while in Cuneo the formation of the 5th Regiment Cacciatori delle Alpi began. On 8 July 1859, the 4th Regiment Cacciatori delle Alpi arrived in Sondrio, where it joined the rest of Garibaldi's corps. On the same day Garibaldi ordered an attack towards Stelvio Pass, which failed. At the same time a battalion of Bersaglieri volunteers from Valtellina joined the corps. On 11 July 1859, the war ended with the Armistice of Villafranca.

After the armistice Garibaldi reorganized his forces and by then the Cacciatori delle Alpi Corps consisted of the following units:

- Cacciatori delle Alpi Corps, Major General Giuseppe Garibaldi
  - 1st Regiment Cacciatori delle Alpi, Lieutenant Colonel Enrico Cosenz
    - 4× battalions
  - 2nd Regiment Cacciatori delle Alpi, Lieutenant Colonel Giacomo Medici
    - 4× battalions
  - 3rd Regiment Cacciatori delle Alpi, Lieutenant Colonel Nicola Ardoino
    - 4× battalions
  - 4th Regiment Cacciatori delle Alpi, Lieutenant Colonel Camillo Baldoni
    - 4× battalions
  - 5th Regiment Cacciatori delle Alpi, Lieutenant Colonel Giuseppe Marocchetti (formed on 8 August 1859)
    - 4× battalions
  - Valtellina Bersaglieri Battalion
  - Youth Battalion
  - 1st, 2nd, 3rd, and 4th Bersaglieri Company
  - Horse Guides Squadron
  - Artillery Battery
  - Sappers Company
  - Nurses Company
  - Ambulance Unit
  - Train Unit

On 15 July 1859, with peace negotiations with Austria underway, the Cacciatori delle Alpi ceased recruiting, and on 20 July the first troops were released from their regiments. On 7 August 1859, Garibaldi resigned as commander of the corps and left with the Horse Guides Squadron to occupy Bologna. On 7 September 1859, the corps was ordered to be reorganized as a standard Royal Sardinian Army infantry brigade with two infantry regiments of four battalions per regiment. Consequently, the five regiments of the corps were reduced to two regiments: the 2nd Regiment, 5th Regiment, and the four Bersaglieri companies formed the 1st Regiment, which was based in Como; while the 1st Regiment, 3rd Regiment, 4th Regiment, and the troops of the Youth Battalion older than 17 years formed the 2nd Regiment in Bergamo. On 11 October 1859, the Brigade "Cacciatori delle Alpi" was formed, and the two regiments were renamed 1st Infantry Regiment (Brigade "Cacciatori delle Alpi"), respectively 2nd Infantry Regiment (Brigade "Cacciatori delle Alpi").

On 30 November 1859, the Horse Guides Squadron, Artillery Battery, Sappers Company, Nurses Company, Ambulance Unit, and Train Unit were disbanded. On 14 May 1860, the brigade was renamed Brigade of the Alps (Italian: Brigata delle Alpi) and the two regiments were renumbered as 51st Infantry Regiment (Brigade of the Alps) and 52nd Infantry Regiment (Brigade of the Alps). On 20 May 1860, the Valtellina Bersaglieri Battalion was disbanded and its personnel divided among the 51st and 52nd infantry regiments. At the same time Giuseppe Garibaldi, led the Expedition of the Thousand to Sicily, whose troops were primarily veterans of the Cacciatori delle Alpi Corps.

On 15 June 1859, the corps' Horse Guides Squadron was awarded a Bronze Medal of Military Valor for its conduct during the war. On the same date the corps' medical units were awarded a shared Bronze Medals of Military Valor for the care they had provided to friendly and enemy injured personnel. On 16 May 1909, as part of the 50th anniversary celebrations of the Second Italian War of Independence, the Cacciatori delle Alpi Corps was awarded a Silver Medal of Military Valor for its conduct during the war. The three medals were duplicated and affixed to the flags of the 51st Infantry Regiment as well as the flag of the 52nd Infantry Regiment.

=== Third Italian War of Independence ===
After the successful conclusion of Garibaldi's Expedition of the Thousand the Kingdom of Sardinia annexed the Kingdom of the Two Sicilies. On 17 March 1861, King Victor Emmanuel II proclaimed himself King of Italy. in 1861, the Brigade of the Alps moved to Palermo. From 1862 to 1863 the Brigade of the Alps operated in the area between Trapani, Castellammare del Golfo, and Palermo to suppress the anti-Sardinian revolt, which had erupted in Southern Italy after the annexation of the Kingdom of the Two Sicilies.

On 16 April 1861, the 52nd Infantry Regiment (Brigade of the Alps) ceded one of its battalions to help form the 62nd Infantry Regiment (Brigade "Sicilia"). On 1 August 1862, the regiment ceded one of its depot companies to help form the 65th Infantry Regiment (Brigade "Valtellina"), and its 17th Company and 18th Company to help form the 70th Infantry Regiment (Brigade "Ancona"). In 1866, the Brigade of the Alps participated in the Third Italian War of Independence, during which it fought in the Battle of Custoza.

On 25 October 1871, the brigade level was abolished, and the two regiments of the Brigade of the Alps were renamed 51st Infantry Regiment "Alpi", respectively 52nd Infantry Regiment "Alpi". On 2 January 1881, the brigade level was reintroduced, and the two regiments were renamed again as 51st Infantry Regiment (Brigade "Alpi") and 52nd Infantry Regiment (Brigade "Alpi"). On 1 November 1884, the 52nd Infantry Regiment ceded some of its companies to help form the 88th Infantry Regiment (Brigade "Friuli") in Milan. In 1895–96, the regiment provided nine officers and 281 enlisted for units deployed to Italian Eritrea for the First Italo-Ethiopian War.

=== Italo-Turkish War ===
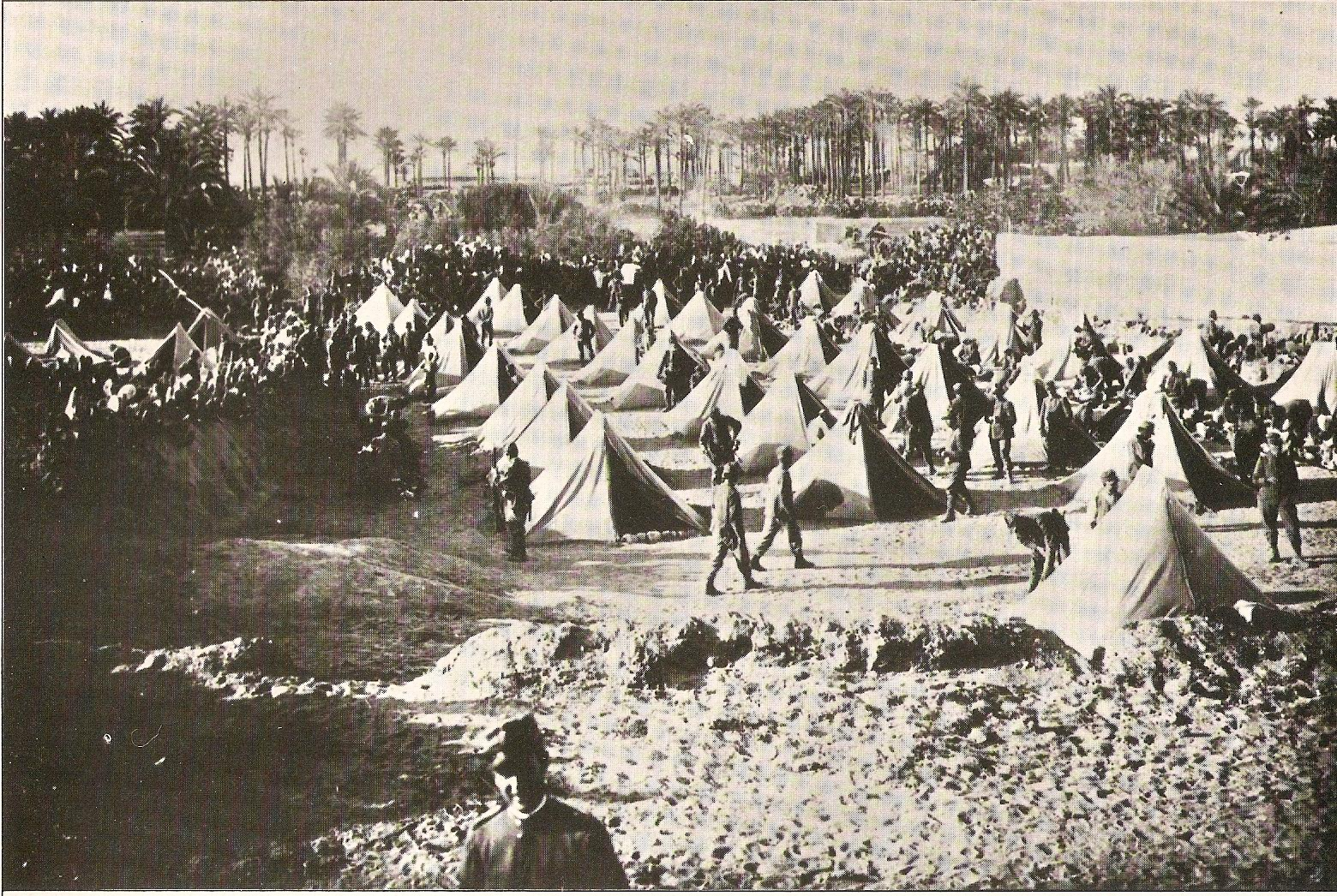
Italian camp near Tripoli during the Italo-Turkish War

In November 1911, the regiment was deployed to Libya for the Italo-Turkish War. On 4 December 1911, the regiment fought in the Battle of Ain Zara and on 20 January 1912 in the Battle of Gargaresc. On 20 September 1912, the regiment fought in the Battle of Sidi Bilal, during which the regiment distinguished itself and was awarded Italy's highest military honor a Gold Medal of Military Valor. The medal was affixed to the regiment's flag and added to the regiment's coat of arms. On 18 June 1913, the regiment fought in the Battle of Ettangi against Libyan rebels. At the end of 1913 the regiment was repatriated, however the regiment's I Battalion remained in Libya to continue the fight against the Libyan rebels.

=== World War I ===
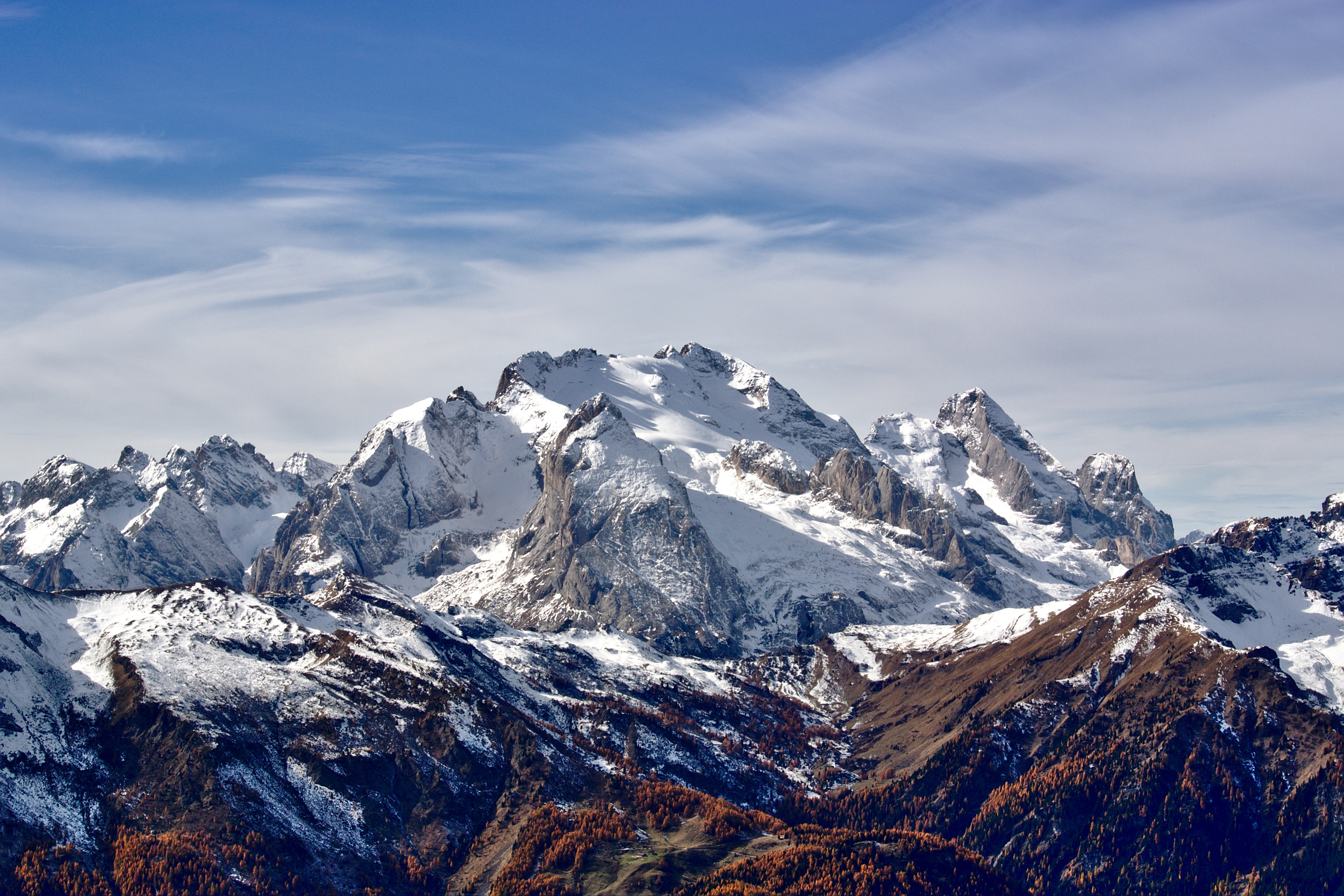
The Marmolada, on which the 52nd Infantry Regiment "Alpi" operated in 1916 and 1917

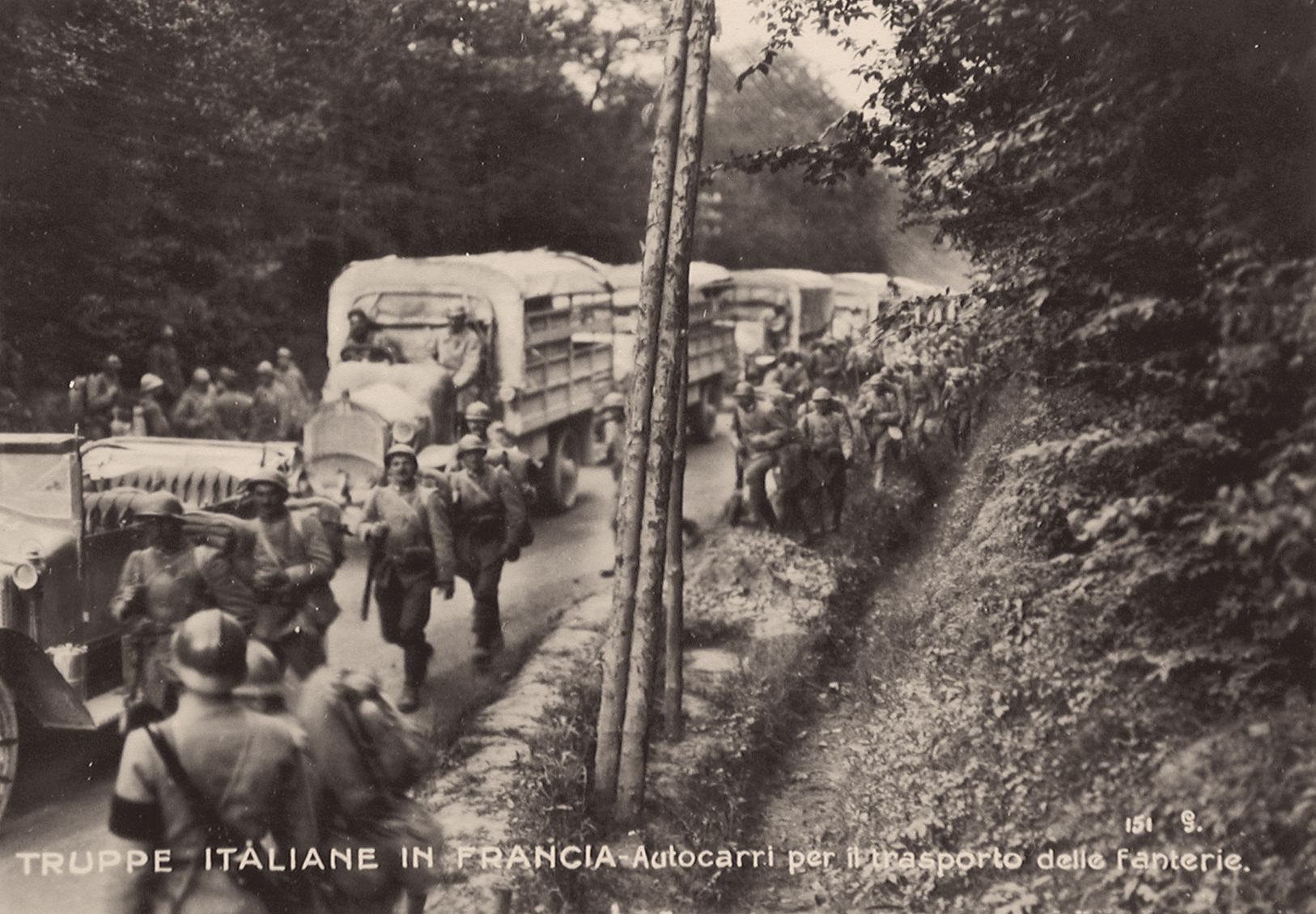
Italian II Army Corps infantry in France in 1918

At the outbreak of World War I, the Brigade "Alpi" formed, together with the Brigade "Calabria" and the 33rd Field Artillery Regiment, the 18th Division. At the time the 52nd Infantry Regiment consisted of the II, III, and IV battalions, each of which fielded four fusilier companies and one machine gun section. The IV Battalion had been formed as replacement for the regiment's I Battalion, which was still deployed in Libya. After Italy's entry into the war on 23 May 1915, the Brigade "Alpi" was deployed on the Italian front: on 5 July 1915, the brigade began operations to clear Austro-Hungarian Army position in the upper Cordevole Valley. From 7 to 20 July 1915, the 52nd Infantry Regiment supported the attacks of the 59th Infantry Regiment (Brigade "Calabria") against the summit of Col di Lana. On 19 July, the regiment's IV Battalion reached the first Austro-Hungarian trenches, but was forced to retreat after the enemy launched a counterattack. The attacks cost the 52nd Infantry Regiment 107 killed in action and 431 wounded in action. Afterwards the regiment was transferred to the area of the nearby Fedaia Pass. In November 1915, the Brigade "Calabria" tried again to conquer the summit of the Col di Lana, and the 52nd Infantry Regiment attacked towards Varda and Cherz. On 20 November 1915, two companies of the 52nd Infantry Regiment and two companies of the 59th Infantry Regiment tried again to conquer the Col di Lana summit, but failed due to the adverse weather conditions.

In 1916–17 the Brigade "Alpi" operated on the Marmolada, where the brigade occupied Punta Serauta on 30 April 1916. In November 1917, after the disastrous Battle of Caporetto the brigade retreated to the new frontline along the Piave river. On 7 November 1917, the Brigade "Alpi" entered the front between the bridge over the Piave river at Vidor and Grave di Ciano. On 22 December 1917, the brigade was sent to the rear. On 18 January 1918, the brigade was sent to the Monte Grappa massif, where it occupied positions on Col del Miglio.

On 23 April 1918, the brigade was assigned to the II Army Corps, which was deployed to the Western Front in France. There the brigade operated in May in the Argonne sector and in June in the Bligny area. In July the brigade fought in the Second Battle of the Marne in the Bois de Courton. In August 1918, the brigade participated in the Hundred Days Offensive, initially in September along the Aisne river at Vauxcéré, and then from 11 October at Chemin des Dames. On 14 October 1918, the brigade reached Sissonne, and on 6 November Rozoy-sur-Serre. On 10 November 1918, the brigade reached Rimogne, where it stopped as the next day the Armistice of Compiègne came into effect.

For their conduct in France the two regiments of the Brigade "Alpi" were both awarded a Silver Medal of Military Valor, which were affixed to the flags of the two regiments. For its conduct in July 1915 on the Col di Lana, the IV Battalion of the 52nd Infantry Regiment was awarded a Silver Medal of Military Valor, which was affixed to the flag of the regiment.

=== Interwar years ===
In 1918, the regiment's I Battalion returned from Libya to Italy, where it was disbanded. Consequently, the regiment's IV Battalion, was renumbered as I Battalion. On 2 January 1919, the Brigade "Alpi" was awarded the right to wear a scarlet-colored tie with the formal uniform to commemorate the brigade's ties with Giuseppe Garibaldi's Redshirts.

On 25 November 1926, the Brigade "Alpi" was renamed XXII Infantry Brigade. The brigade was the infantry component of the 22nd Territorial Division of Perugia, which also included the 1st Field Artillery Regiment. On the same date the brigade's two infantry regiments were renamed 51st Infantry Regiment "Alpi", respectively 62nd Infantry Regiment "Alpi", and the XXII Infantry Brigade received the 81st Infantry Regiment "Torino" from the disbanded Brigade "Torino".

On 1 October 1934, the 52nd Infantry Regiment "Alpi" merged with the Complementary Infantry Officer Recruits School in Spoleto and then consisted then of two recruit battalions and one fusilier battalion. In 1934 the 22nd Territorial Division of Perugia changed its name to 22nd Infantry Division "Cacciatori delle Alpi". A name change that also extended to the division's infantry brigade. In 1935–36 the 52nd Infantry Regiment "Alpi" provided 15 officers and 123 troops to units deployed to East Africa for the Second Italo-Ethiopian War. On 15 July 1936, the 81st Infantry Regiment "Torino" was transferred to the newly formed 52nd Infantry Division "Torino". In 1939 the XXII Infantry Brigade "Cacciatori delle Alpi" was disbanded and its two infantry regiments came under direct command of the division. At the same time the 1st Field Artillery Regiment was renamed 1st Artillery Regiment "Cacciatori delle Alpi" and the 52nd Infantry Regiment "Alpi" moved from Spoleto to Terni.

=== World War II ===
At the beginning of 1940, the 52nd Infantry Regiment "Alpi" lost its training function and was reorganized as a standard infantry regiment. The regiment then consisted of a command, a command company, three fusilier battalions, a support weapons battery equipped with 65/17 infantry support guns, and a mortar company equipped with 81mm Mod. 35 mortars. On 10 June 1940, Italy entered World War II by invading France and the "Cacciatori delle Alpi" division was part of the 1st Army's reserve. On 19 June 1940, the division was assigned an attack sector at Triora-Vallecrosia-Camporosso, but the war with France ended on 24 June before the division saw combat.

==== Greco-Italian War ====
In January 1941, the 22nd Infantry Division "Cacciatori delle Alpi" was transferred to Albania to shore up the crumbling Italian front during the Greco-Italian War. On 18 January 1941, the division reached Bubës and assembled the next day near Berat. On 21 January, the division entered the front between Qafë and Bubës, with the task to block Greek attacks in the Osum river valley. On 25 January, Greek forces attacked with the aim to force a path to Berat. By 28 January, Greek forces had succeeded in breaking the "Cacciatori delle Alpi" division's line and the severely decimated division gave way and retreated north until reaching the Shkumbin river. On 9–10 February 1941, a minor defensive battle was won by the Italians at Mali i Firtit, which stopped the Greek advance. On 15 April 1941, the Italian spring offensive commenced and the "Cacciatori delle Alpi" division attacked at Korçë, reaching Cerovë after some fighting. On 21 April 1941, the division crossed the Vjosa river near Përmet and blocked the retreat route of the Greek army. On 28 April 1941, the division moved to Korçë and from there to the Greek border around the Mavri Petra mountain near Ersekë.

For its conduct on the Greek Front between December 1940 and April 1941, the 52nd Infantry Regiment "Alpi" was awarded a Bronze Medal of Military Valor, which was affixed to the regiment's flag and added to the regiment's coat of arms.

==== Yugoslavia ====
In July 1941, the "Cacciatori delle Alpi" division was transferred to Podgorica in Montenegro on occupation duty. In September 1941, the division moved to the area between Split and Šibenik in Croatia. From 9 October until 9 November 1941, the division fought against Yugoslav Partisans on the Croatian-Serbian border. In December 1941, the division was transferred to Metković in Croatia. Sporadic fighting with partisans occurred from Dubrovnik to Gacko. Between 8 April and 14 June 1942, the division took part in the anti-partisan operation Operation Trio in Croatia. Between 5–12 May 1942, the division fought in the Third anti-Partisan Offensive. This operation was a follow-up to Operation Trio and had as objective the destruction of the Partisan forces in eastern Bosnia, which had been forced there by Operation Trio.

While the "Cacciatori delle Alpi" division was on occupation duty in Yugoslavia the division's depots in Italy formed the 151st Infantry Division "Perugia", for which the depot of the 52nd Infantry Regiment "Cacciatori delle Alpi" in Terni formed on 14 August 1941 the 130th Infantry Regiment "Perugia".

On 8 September 1943, the Armistice of Cassibile was announced and the "Cacciatori delle Alpi" division, which at the time was on occupation duty in the Ljubljana and Rijeka area in Slovenia, was disbanded by invading German forces.

=== Cold War ===
On 1 July 1958, the 52nd Infantry Regiment "Alpi" was reformed by renaming the existing 2nd Recruits Training Center in Cuneo. The regiment consisted of command, a command company, and four recruit battalions. On 1 July 1963, the regiment transferred its I Battalion and II Battalion to the 48th Infantry Regiment "Ferrara" and the moved from Cuneo to Fossano, while the regiment's base in Cuneo was taken over by the 2nd Alpini Regiment.

On 22 September 1964, the regiment moved from Fossano in Piedmont to Tarcento in Friuli-Venezia Giulia, where the regiment was reorganized and designated 52nd Infantry Fortification Regiment "Alpi". The regiment consisted of a command and a command and services company, and was assigned three fortification battalions. The regiment was assigned to the Infantry Division "Mantova" and tasked with maintaining and manning fortifications of the Alpine Wall between the Natisone river and the border with Yugoslavia from Capriva del Friuli in the South to the valleys just North of Cividale, as well as a second line of fortification on the Western bank of the Torre river from Udine to Tarcento, and the fortifications, which blocked the exists of the valleys leading to the border with Yugoslavia. At the time the regiment consisted of the following units:

- 52nd Infantry Fortification Regiment "Alpi", in Tarcento
  - Command and Services Company, in Tarcento
  - I Battalion, in Attimis, with a detached company in Tarcento
  - II Battalion (Reserve), in Tarcento
  - III Battalion, in Ipplis, with a detached company in Grupignano and a detached company in Purgessimo

During the 1975 army reform, the army disbanded the regimental level and newly independent battalions were granted for the first time their own flags. On 30 September 1976, the 52nd Infantry Fortification Regiment "Alpi" and its II Battalion were disbanded. The next day the regiment's I Battalion and III Battalion became autonomous units and were renamed 52nd Infantry Fortification Battalion "Alpi" and 120th Infantry Fortification Battalion "Fornovo". The 52nd Infantry Fortification Battalion "Alpi" was based in Attimis, with a detached company in Grupignano. On 12 November 1976, the President of the Italian Republic Giovanni Leone assigned with decree 846 the flag and traditions of the 52nd Infantry Regiment "Alpi" to the 52nd Infantry Fortification Battalion "Alpi".

The battalion was assigned to the Mechanized Brigade "Isonzo" and tasked with manning the fortifications of the Alpine Wall on the Western bank of the Torre river from Udine to Tarcento, and the fortifications, which blocked the exists of the valleys leading to the border with Yugoslavia. For its conduct and work after the 1976 Friuli earthquake the battalion was awarded a Bronze Medal of Army Valor, which was affixed to the battalion's flag and added to the battalion's coat of arms.

In 1986 the Italian Army abolished the divisional level and brigades, which until then had been under one of the Army's four divisions, came under direct command of the Army's 3rd Army Corps or 5th Army Corps. As the Mechanized Division "Mantova" carried the traditions of the 104th Infantry Division "Mantova" and Combat Group "Mantova", which had both fought against the Germans during the Italian campaign of World War II the army decided to retain the name of the division. On 30 September 1986, the Mantova's division command in Udine was disbanded and the next day the command of the Mechanized Brigade "Isonzo" moved from Cividale del Friuli to Udine, where the command was renamed Mechanized Brigade "Mantova". The brigade retained the Isonzo's units, including the 52nd Infantry Fortification Battalion "Alpi" and 120th Infantry Fortification Battalion "Fornovo".

On 10 October 1986, 120th Infantry Fortification Battalion "Fornovo" took over the duty to maintain and man the fortifications along the Tagliamento river from the disbanded 73rd Infantry Fortification Battalion "Lombardia". In turn the 120th Infantry Fortification Battalion "Fornovo" transferred on 1 August 1987 its detached company in Purgessimo to the 52nd Infantry Fortification Battalion "Alpi".

=== Recent times ===
On 30 June 1991, the 59th Mechanized Infantry Battalion "Calabria" in Cividale was disbanded and on 1 July the 52nd Infantry Fortification Battalion "Alpi" moved from Attimis to Cividale. On 31 March 1993, the 52nd Infantry Fortification Battalion "Alpi" was disbanded in Cividale and the next day the Command and Support Unit "Aquileia" of the 3rd Artillery Regiment "Aquileia" in Portogruaro was reorganized as a training unit and renamed 52nd Battalion "Alpi". The 52nd Battalion "Alpi" was assigned to the 5th Army Corps and received the flag and traditions of the 52nd Infantry Regiment "Alpi". On 29 August 1996, the 52nd Battalion "Alpi" transferred the flag of the 52nd Infantry Regiment "Alpi" to the Shrine of the Flags in the Vittoriano in Rome and two days later, on 31 August 1996, the battalion was disbanded.
