= 130th Infantry Regiment "Perugia" =

Inactive Italian Army infantry unit

- 130° Reggimento Fanteria "Perugia"
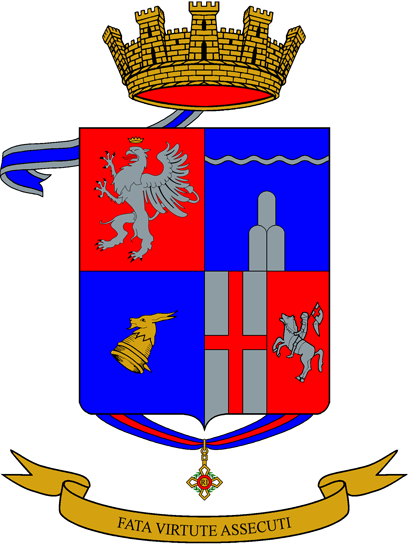
- Regimental coat of arms
- Active: 1 March 1915 – Jan. 1920; 14 Aug. 1941 – 20 Sept. 1943; 1 Oct. 1975 – 30 June 1996
- Country: Italy
- Branch: Italian Army
- Garrison/HQ: Spoleto
- Motto: "Fata virtute assecuti"
- Anniversaries: 19 June 1918 – Battle of Fagarè del Piave
- Decorations: 1× Military Order of Italy; 1× Silver Medal of Military Valor

Insignia
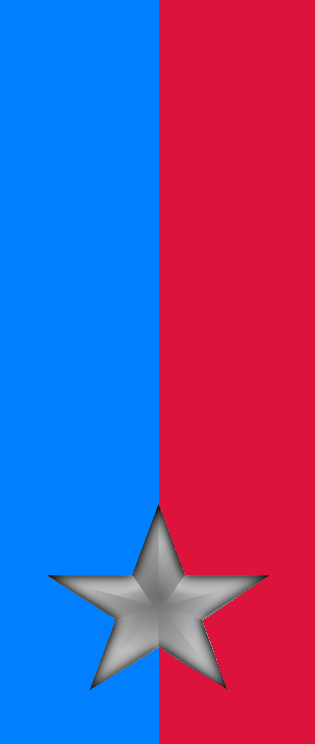
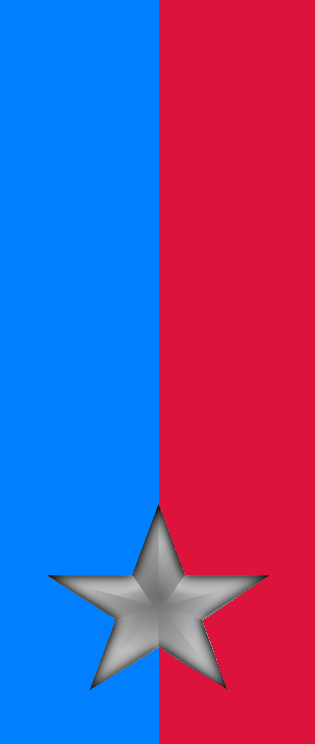
- Regimental gorget patches

The 130th Infantry Regiment "Perugia" (Italian: 130° Reggimento Fanteria "Perugia") is an inactive unit of the Italian Army last based on the island of Pantelleria. The regiment is named for the city of Perugia and part of the Italian Army's infantry arm.

The regiment was formed in preparation for Italy's entry into World War I. During the war the regiment fought on the Italian front and was disbanded once the war concluded. The regiment was reformed in August 1941 for service in World War II and assigned to the 151st Infantry Division "Perugia". The Perugia division was sent to as occupation force to Yugoslavia, where the division was informed of the Armistice of Cassibile on 8 September 1943. The division resisted invading German forces and Albanian partisans and tried to reach the coast in the hope to be able to embark for Italy. Part of the regiment reached the harbour of Vlorë, but the regiment was forced to surrender to the Germans on 20 September 1943. On 1 January 1976 the regiment was reformed as a battalion sized motorized unit. In 1991 the regiment was reformed, but with the reduction in forces after the Cold War the regiment was disbanded in 1996.

== History ==
=== Formation ===
On 1 March 1915 the 130th Infantry Regiment (Brigade "Perugia") was formed in Rome by the regimental depot of the 81st Infantry Regiment (Brigade "Torino"). On the same date the 129th Infantry Regiment (Brigade "Perugia") and the command of the Brigade "Perugia" were formed in Perugia by the regimental depot of the 51st Infantry Regiment (Brigade "Alpi"). The brigade consisted of personnel levied in Umbria and Lazio. Both regiments consisted of three battalions, which each fielded four fusilier companies and one machine gun section. The Brigade "Perugia" formed, together with the Brigade "Lazio", the 29th Division.

=== World War I ===
During World War I the Brigade "Perugia" fought on the Italian front: in July 1915 at Lucinico near Gorizia and then in November and December during the Fourth Battle of the Isonzo on the slopes of Monte San Michele on the Karst plateau. In June 1916 the brigade was transferred as reinforcements to the Sette Comuni plateau, where the Austro-Hungarian Army had unleashed the Battle of Asiago on 15 May. The brigade fought for control of Monte Lemerle and then in July for Monte Zebio. In February 1917 the infantry regiments of the Brigade "Perugia" ceded both two companies to help from the infantry regiments of the newly formed Brigade "Gaeta". In May and June 1917 the Brigade "Perugia" participated in the Tenth Battle of the Isonzo in the area of Kostanjevica na Krasu, and in November of the same year the brigade fought on the slopes Meletta di Gallio and in December for Monte Castelgomberto. In June 1918 the brigade defended Ponte di Piave during the Second Battle of the Piave River. For their conduct during the war the brigade's two regiments were each awarded a Silver Medal of Military Valor. After the war the brigade and its two regiments were disbanded on 31 January 1920.

=== World War II ===
After Italy's entry into World War II the two regiments of the Brigade "Perugia" were reformed by the regimental depots of the 22nd Infantry Division "Cacciatori delle Alpi": on 12 August 1941 the 129th Infantry Regiment "Perugia" was reformed in Perugia by the depot of 51st Infantry Regiment "Cacciatori delle Alpi", while the 130th Infantry Regiment "Perugia" was reformed in Terni on 14 August 1941 by the depot of the 52nd Infantry Regiment "Cacciatori delle Alpi". The two regiments were assigned on 25 August of the same year to the 151st Infantry Division "Perugia", which also included the newly formed 151st Artillery Regiment "Perugia", that had been formed by the 1st Artillery Regiment "Cacciatori delle Alpi" in Foligno. The two infantry regiments consisted of a command, a command company, three fusilier battalions, a cannons company equipped with 47/32 anti-tank guns, and a mortar company equipped with 81mm Mod. 35 mortars.

The division was sent to Yugoslavia on occupation duty, where it remained until the Armistice of Cassibile was announced on 8 September 1943, after which the division was attacked by German forces and Albanian partisans. The Perugia's commander ordered his troops to move to the coast and embark to Italy. The remnants of the 130th Infantry Regiment "Perugia" fought their way to the harbour of Vlorë and set up a defensive perimeter, which managed to withstand the German attacks until 20 September 1943. The remnants of the 129th Infantry Regiment "Perugia", together with the division's command, reached the harbour of Sarandë, where the Germans besieged the Italians. Approximately 1,000 men could be shipped back to Italy with the vessels in the harbor. No help from Italy or the Allies arrived and so between 3–5 October the German 1st Mountain Division overran most of the Perugia's positions and immediately executed all captured officers and non-commissioned officers.

=== Cold War ===
During the 1975 army reform the army disbanded the regimental level and newly independent battalions were granted for the first time their own flags. On 1 January 1976, the 130th Motorized Infantry Battalion "Perugia" was formed in Spoleto and assigned the flag and traditions of the 130th Infantry Regiment "Perugia". The battalion took over the base and received the equipment of the II Battalion of the 17th Infantry Regiment "Acqui", which had been disbanded on 30 September 1975. The battalion was assigned to the Motorized Brigade "Acqui" and consisted of a command, a command and services company, three motorized companies, and a heavy mortar company equipped with towed 120mm Mod. 63 mortars. At the time the battalion fielded 844 men (41 officers, 94 non-commissioned officers, and 709 soldiers).

=== Recent times ===
In 1991, after the end of the Cold War, the Italian Army disbanded a large number of its mechanized units in Northern Italy and transferred their equipment to the Acqui, which became a mechanized formation. The battalion consisted now of a command, a command and services company, three mechanized companies equipped with M113 armored personnel carriers, and a mortar company equipped with M106 mortar carriers with 120mm Mod. 63 mortars. On 3 September 1991 the 130th Mechanized Infantry Battalion "Perugia" lost its autonomy and the next day the battalion entered the reformed 130th Mechanized Infantry Regiment "Perugia". On 1 January 1993 the regiment was renamed 130th Infantry Regiment "Perugia".

On 15 May 1996 the regiment was transferred to the Mechanized Brigade "Granatieri di Sardegna", but already on 30 June of the same year the regiment was disbanded. On 3 July 1996 the flag of the regiment was transferred to the Shrine of the Flags in the Vittoriano in Rome.
