= 22nd Infantry Division "Cacciatori delle Alpi" =

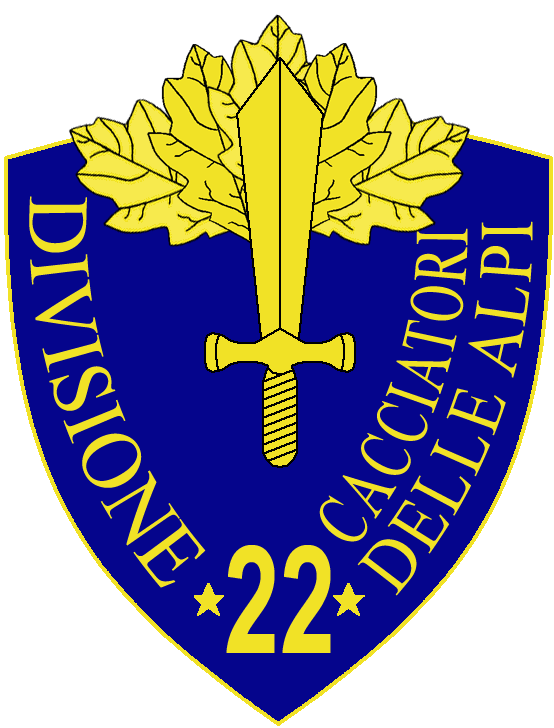
- 22nd Infantry Division "Cacciatori delle Alpi" insignia
- Active: 1939–1943
- Country: Kingdom of Italy
- Branch: Royal Italian Army
- Type: Infantry
- Size: Division
- Garrison/HQ: Perugia
- Engagements: World War II: Operation Trio; Operation Foča

Insignia
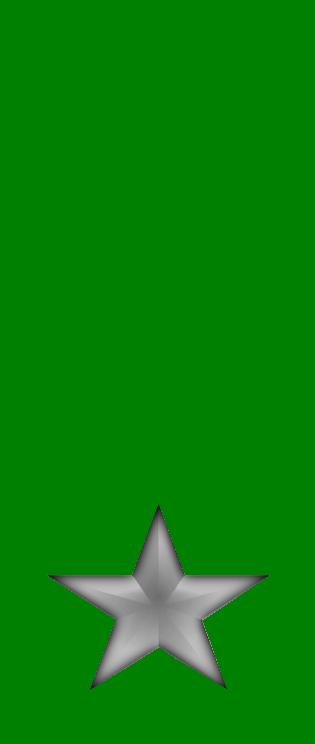
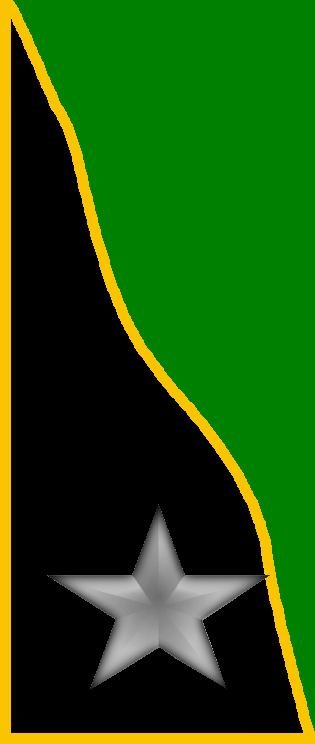
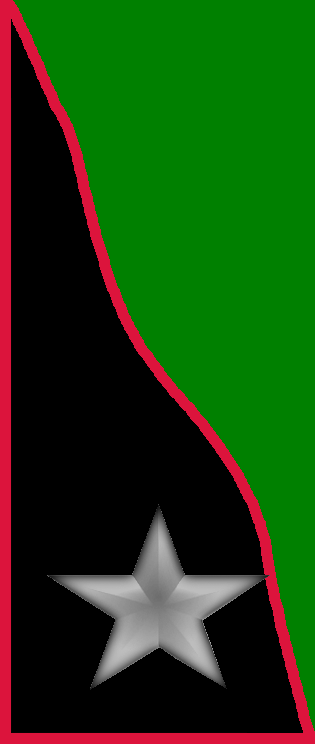
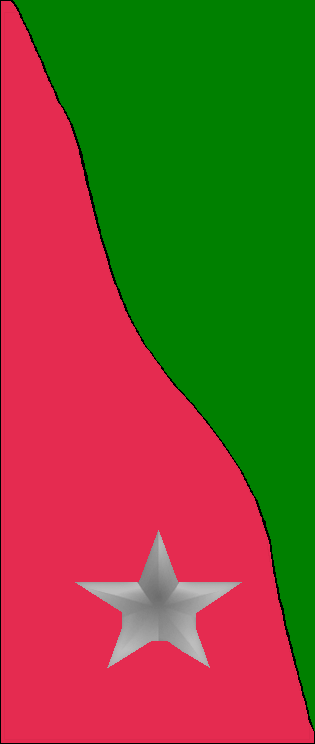
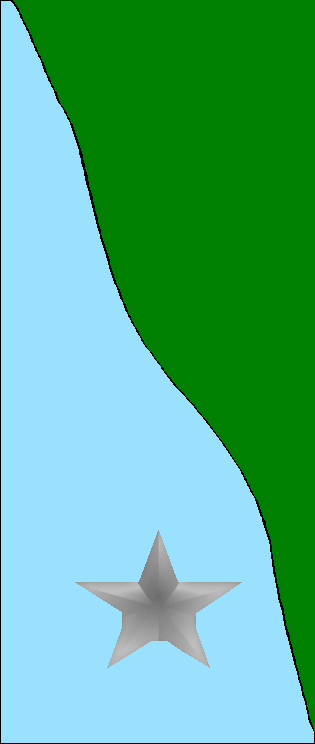
- Identification symbol: Cacciatori delle Alpi Division gorget patches

The 22nd Infantry Division "Cacciatori delle Alpi" (Italian: 22ª Divisione di fanteria "Cacciatori delle Alpi" English: Hunters of the Alps) was an infantry division of the Royal Italian Army during World War II. The division was based in Perugia and named for the Cacciatori delle Alpi corps raised for the Second War of Italian Independence.

== History ==
The division's lineage begins with the Cacciatori delle Alpi regimental depot established by the Royal Sardinian Army on 17 March 1859 in Cuneo to train volunteers for the upcoming Second War of Italian Independence. On 24 April 1859 the depot was elevated to Brigade "Cacciatori delle Alpi" with the 1st, 2nd, and 3rd Cacciatori delle Alpi regiments. The brigade fought in the Alps during the war and was merged on 10 October 1859 with the two regiments of the "Cacciatori degli Apennini" (English: Hunters of the Apennine) to form a regular brigade with the 1st and 2nd Cacciatori delle Alpi regiments. On 14 May 1860 the brigade's name was shortened to "Alpi" and its two regiments were renamed as 51st Infantry Regiment and 52nd Infantry Regiment.

=== World War I ===
During World War I the brigade fought initially on the Italian front, but in April 1918 it was transferred together with the Brigade "Brescia", Brigade "Napoli", and Brigade "Salerno" to the Western Front in France. There the brigades fought in the Third Battle of the Aisne, Second Battle of the Marne, Battle of Saint-Thierry, and the Hundred Days Offensive.

Some 220 officers and 6,000 soldiers of the "Alpi" Brigade remained in Belgium after the end of World War I under the command of the British XI Corps. Between 9 and 13 March 1919, they were moved to occupied Germany, first occupying the villages of Winden and Schaidt. On 1 April, they replaced the French 2nd Colonial Division on the front between Lauterbourg and Pfortz. On 17 May, their front was extended to Jockgrim. Between 17 and 19 June, they moved to the area around Worms and Oppenheim. They remained in Germany until 28 July.

=== Interwar ===
On 25 November 1926 the brigade assumed the name of XXII Infantry Brigade and received the 81st Infantry Regiment "Torino" from the disbanded Brigade "Torino". The brigade was the infantry component of the 22nd Territorial Division of Perugia, which also included the 1st Artillery Regiment. On 1 October 1934 the 52nd Infantry Regiment "Alpi" merged with the Complementary Infantry Officer Recruits School in Spoleto and was reorganized with two recruit battalions and one fusilier battalion. On 1 January 1935 the division changed its name to 22nd Infantry Division "Cacciatori delle Alpi".

On 15 July 1936 the 81st Infantry Regiment "Torino" was transferred to the newly activated 52nd Infantry Division "Torino". In 1939 the XXII Infantry Brigade was dissolved, with the infantry regiments coming under direct command of the division, and the 1st Artillery Regiment received the name "Cacciatori delle Alpi". The same year the 52nd Infantry Regiment "Alpi" lost its training function and moved to Terni.

=== World War II ===
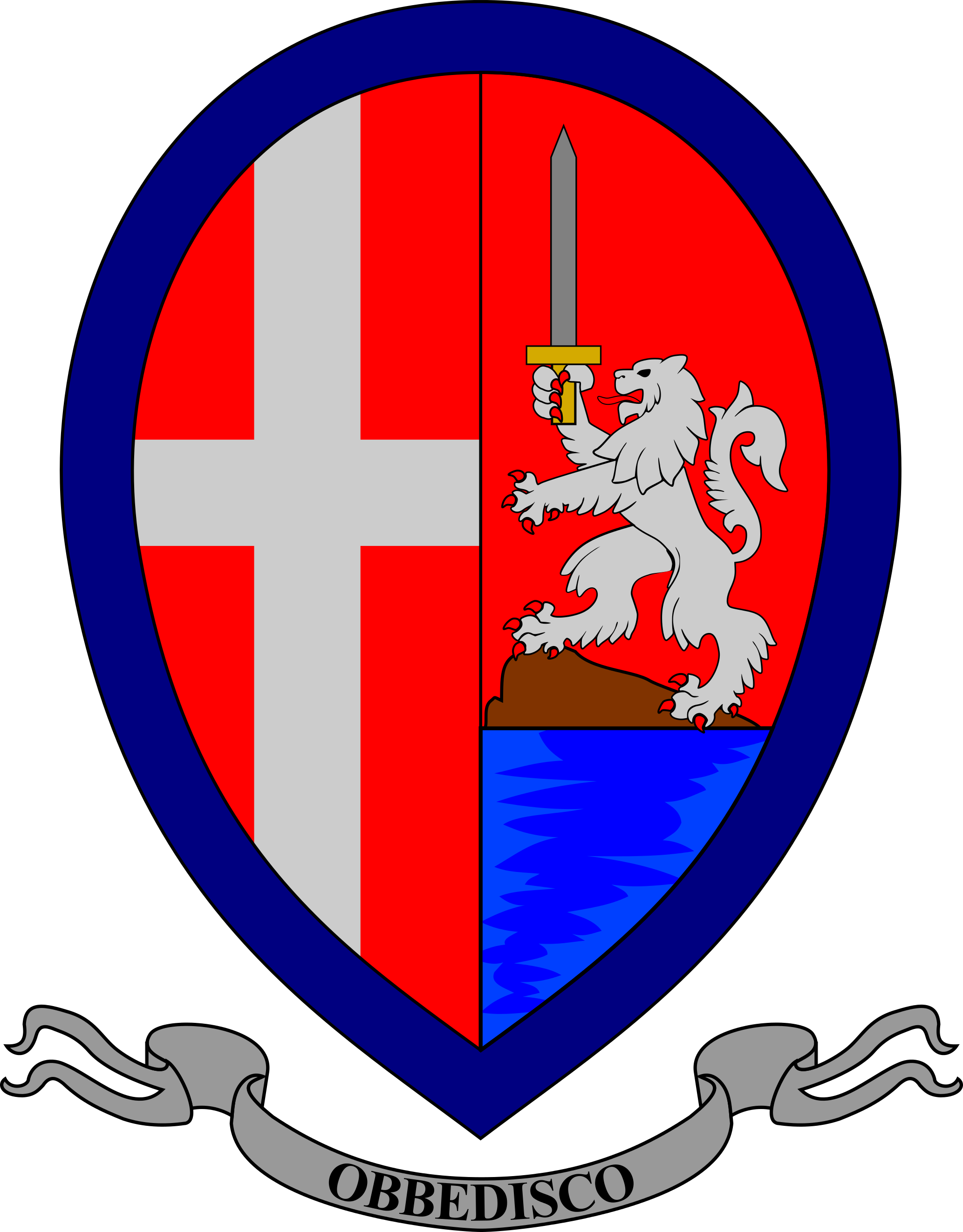
Coat of Arms of the 51st Infantry Regiment "Alpi", 1939

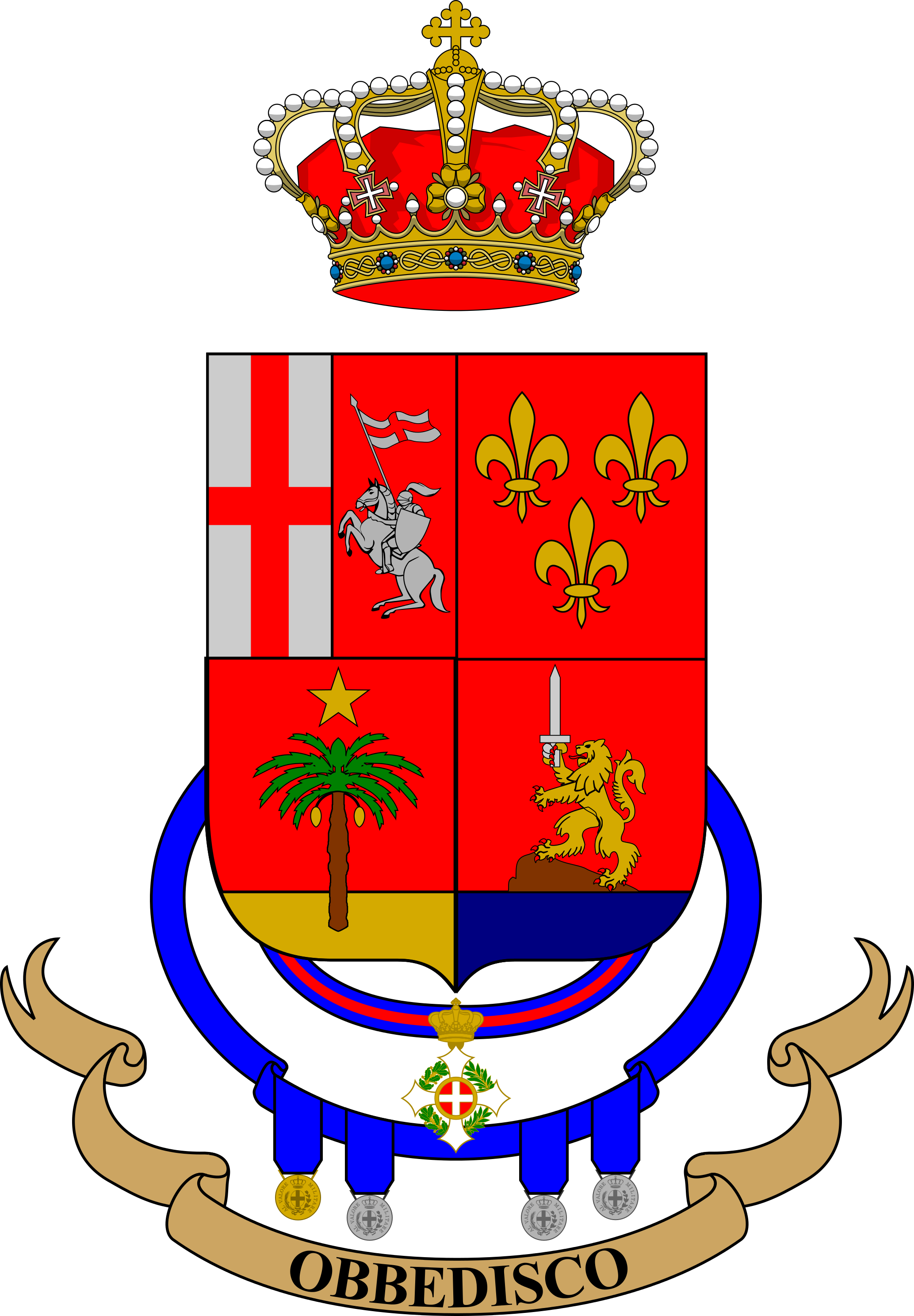
Coat of Arms of the 52nd Infantry Regiment "Alpi", 1942

When the Italian invasion of France started 10 June 1940, the Cacciatori delle Alpi division remained in reserve as part of the 1st Army in the Perinaldo-Pigna, Liguria-Castel Vittorio area near the border with France. It was moved out of reserve on 19 June 1940 and assigned an attack sector at Triora-Vallecrosia-Camporosso, but the war with France ended on 24 June 1940 before the division saw combat.

==== Greco-Italian War ====
In early January 1941 the division was sent to Albania to reinforce the crumbling Italian front during the Greek offensive in the Greco-Italian War. The division reached Bubës on 18 January 1941 and assembled near Berat on 19 January. On 21 January the division entered the front between Qafa e Bubësit, Përroi i Branecit, with the task to block Greek attacks in the Osum river valley. On 25 January Greek forces attacked with the aim to force a path to Berat. By 28 January the Greeks had succeeded in breaking the Cacciatori's line and the severely decimated division gave way and retreated north until reaching the Shkumbin river. A minor defensive battle was won by Italians at Mali i Firtit on 9–10 February 1941, which stopped the Greek advance. With the start of the general Italian offensive on 15 April 1941, the Cacciatori delle Alpi participated in an attack on Korçë, reaching Cerovë after some fighting. It crossed the Vjosë river near Përmet on 21 April 1941, blocking the retreat route of the Greek army. On 28 April 1941 it moved to Korçë and from there to the Greek border around Mavri Petra mountain near Ersekë.

==== Yugoslavia ====
In July 1941 the Cacciatori delle Alpi was transferred to Podgorica in Montenegro. In September 1941 it moved to the area between Split and Šibenik in Croatia. From 9 October until 9 November 1941 the division fought against Yugoslav Partisans on the Croatian-Serbian border. In December 1941, the division was transferred to Metković in Croatia. Sporadic fighting with partisans occurred from Dubrovnik to Gacko. The division took part in Operation Trio between 8 April and 14 June 1942, which was an anti-partisan operation in Croatia with the objective of destroying partisan and Chetnik forces. The division was also involved in the Operation Foča between 5-12 May 1942. This operation was a follow-on from Operation Trio with the objective of destroying the Partisan forces in eastern Bosnia, which had been forced there by Operation Trio.

While the Cacciatori delle Alpi was on occupation duty in Yugoslavia the division's regimental depots in Italy raised the 151st Infantry Division "Perugia": the depot of the 51st Infantry Regiment "Cacciatori delle Alpi" raised the 129th Infantry Regiment "Perugia", the depot of the 52nd Infantry Regiment "Cacciatori delle Alpi" raised the 130th Infantry Regiment "Perugia", and the depot of the 1st Artillery Regiment "Cacciatori delle Alpi" raised the 151st Artillery Regiment "Perugia".

The division was in the Ljubljana and Rijeka areas when the Armistice of Cassibile was announced on 8 September 1943 and was disbanded by invading German forces on 11 September 1943.

== Organization ==
22nd Infantry Division "Cacciatori delle Alpi" organization in 1940

- 22nd Infantry Division "Cacciatori delle Alpi", in Perugia
  - Headquarters
    - Command Company
    - 479th Carabinieri Section
    - 480th Carabinieri Section
    - 100th Field Post Office
    - 22nd Infantry Division Command Transport Squad
  - 51st Infantry Regiment "Cacciatori delle Alpi", (Note: Named 51st Infantry Regiment "Alpi" until 1939 when the army reorganized its divisions as binary divisions and divisional infantry regiments took the name of the division.) in Perugia
    - Command Company
    - 3 × Fusilier battalions
    - Support Weapons Battery (65/17 mod. 13 infantry support guns)
    - Mortar Company (81mm mod. 35 mortars)
  - 52nd Infantry Regiment "Cacciatori delle Alpi", (Note: Named 52nd Infantry Regiment "Alpi" until 1939 when the army reorganized its divisions as binary divisions and divisional infantry regiments took the name of the division.) in Spoleto (1905-1939), then in Terni (1939-1943)
    - Command Company
    - 3 × Fusilier battalions
    - Support Weapons Battery (65/17 mod. 13 infantry support guns)
    - Mortar Company (81mm mod. 35 mortars)
  - 1st Artillery Regiment "Cacciatori delle Alpi", in Foligno
    - Command Unit
    - I Group (100/17 mod. 14 howitzers)
    - II Group (75/27 mod. 06 field guns; left the regiment in early 1941)
    - III Group (75/13 mod. 15 mountain guns; left the regiment in early 1941)
    - II Group (75/18 mod. 35 howitzers; joined the regiment in early 1941)
    - III Group (75/18 mod. 35 howitzers; joined the regiment in early 1941)
    - 1 × Anti-aircraft battery (20/65 mod. 35 anti-aircraft guns)
    - Ammunition and Supply Unit
  - XXII Mortar Battalion (81mm mod. 35 mortars)
  - 22nd Anti-tank Company (47/32 mod. 35 anti-tank guns)
  - 22nd Telegraph and Radio Operators Company
  - 56th Engineer Company
  - 25th Medical Section
    - 3 × Field hospitals
    - 1 × Surgical unit
  - 26th Supply Section
  - 69th Autocarrette Section
  - 162nd Transport Section

Attached from the end 1940 to early 1942:

- 105th CC.NN. Legion "Mussolini"
  - CIV CC.NN. Battalion
  - CV CC.NN. Battalion (remained attached to the division until 11 September 1943)
  - 105th CC.NN. Machine Gun Company

== Commanding officers ==
The division's commanding officers were:

- Generale di Divisione Giovanni Zanghieri (9 September 1937 - 30 September 1940)
- Generale di Divisione Dante Lorenzelli (1 October 1939 - 10 September 1940)
- Generale di Divisione Angelo Pivano (11 September 1940 - 15 June 1942)
- Generale di Divisione Vittorio Ruggero (16 June 1942 - 9 March 1943)
- Generale di Brigata Luigi Maggiore-Perni (10 March 1943 - 11 September 1943)

== CROWCASS ==
The names of two men attached to the division can be found in the Central Registry of War Criminals and Security Suspects (CROWCASS) set up by the Anglo-American Supreme Headquarters Allied Expeditionary Force in 1945. The names can be found at: Central Registry of War Criminals and Security Suspects from the Kingdom of Italy.
