= Chiminello =

Chiminello is an Italian surname. Notable people with the surname include:

- Bianca Chiminello (born 1976), Australian model and actress
- Ernesto Chiminello (1890–1943), Italian military officer

== See also ==
- 24939 Chiminello, minor planet
