= Ottorino Schreiber =

Italian general

- Born: 11 June 1890; Parma, Kingdom of Italy
- Died: 2 November 1978 (aged 88); Turin, Italy
- Military career
- Allegiance: Kingdom of Italy
- Branch: Royal Italian Army
- Rank: Brigadier General
- Commands: 56th Infantry Regiment "Marche"; 207th Coastal Division; Schreiber Tactical Group; 26th Infantry Division Assietta
- Conflicts: World War I; Battles of the Isonzo; Second Battle of the Piave River; Battle of Vittorio Veneto; World War II; Italian campaign on the Eastern Front; Allied invasion of Sicily
- Awards: Silver Medal of Military Valour (three times); Military Order of Savoy; Colonial Order of the Star of Italy

Ottorino Schreiber (Parma, 11 June 1890 – Turin, 2 November 1978) was an Italian general during World War II.

== Biography ==
He was born in Parma to a noble family of German descent, on 11 June 1890. He enlisted in the Royal Italian Army in 1909, enrolling in the Royal Military Academy of Infantry and Cavalry in Modena, graduating as infantry second lieutenant on September 19, 1911. He participated in the First World War, rising from lieutenant to major, in the ranks of the 30th Infantry Regiment, participating in the battles of the Isonzo, of the Piave and of Vittorio Veneto, and earning three Silver Medals for Military Valor. On 1 December 1926 he was promoted to lieutenant colonel and assigned to the Royal Corps of Colonial Troops in Eritrea.

After promotion to colonel on 31 December 1936, on 12 October 1937 he was given command of the 56th Infantry Regiment "Marche", and on 1 November 1939 he became head of the mobilization office at the general directorate of logistic services at the Ministry of War in Rome. He remained here until 1 September 1941 when, in the middle of World War II, he was sent to Palermo and appointed commander of the infantry of the 28th Infantry Division Aosta, until 30 November 1941. On the following 20 December he became commander of the infantry of the 52nd Infantry Division "Torino", deployed on the Eastern front, replacing Brigadier General Ugo de Carolis, who had been killed in action on 12 December. He was promoted to brigadier general on January 1, 1942, remaining on the Eastern front until the following 24 October, when he was repatriated and given command of the 207th Coastal Division (with headquarters in Palermo), after a short period at the disposal of the Ministry of War, on 1 December 1942.

On 24 December 1942, he was awarded the Knight's Cross of the Military Order of Savoy for his conduct on the Eastern front. During the early stages of the Allied invasion of Sicily, in July 1943, he was among the protagonists of the Axis defense, launching several counterattacks near Canicattì and Campobello di Licata with an armored tactical group (Raggruppamento Schreiber) and later covering the retreat of other Axis units from western Sicily. After the destruction of his tactical group by George Patton's Provisional Corps on 21 July, on 26 July he briefly assumed command of the remains of the 26th Infantry Division Assietta, retreating to Calabria in August. The division was then transferred to Asti for reorganization, and dissolved following the Armistice of Cassibile on 8 September 1943; Schreiber then joined the Italian Resistance in Turin.

He died in Turin on November 2, 1978.
