= 151st Infantry Division "Perugia" =

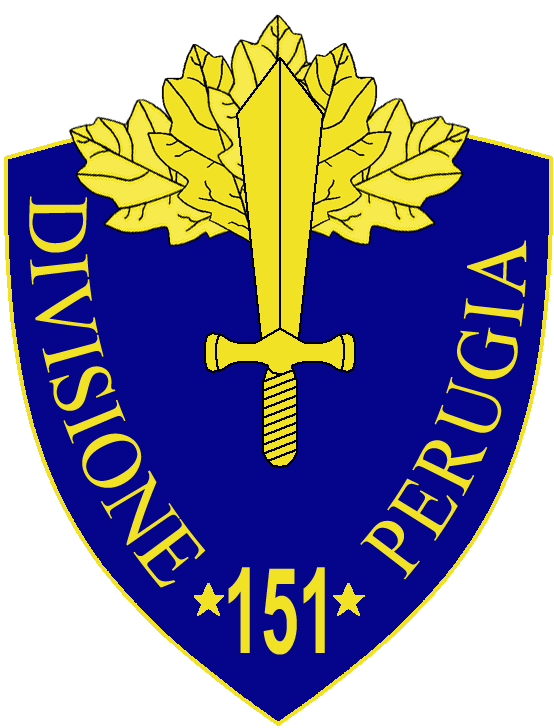
- 151st Infantry Division "Perugia" insignia
- Active: 25 August 1941 – 7 October 1943
- Country: Kingdom of Italy
- Branch: Royal Italian Army
- Type: Infantry
- Size: Division
- Engagements: World War II; Battle of Sutjeska

Insignia
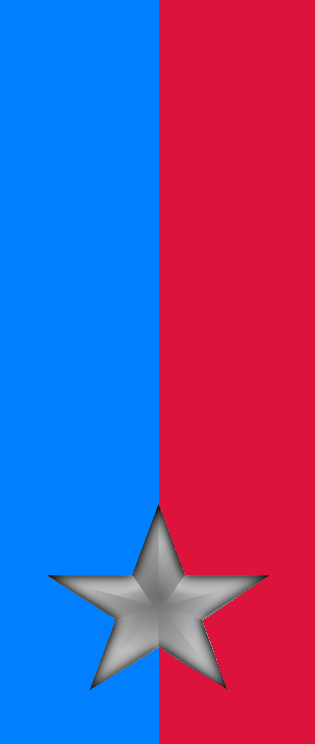
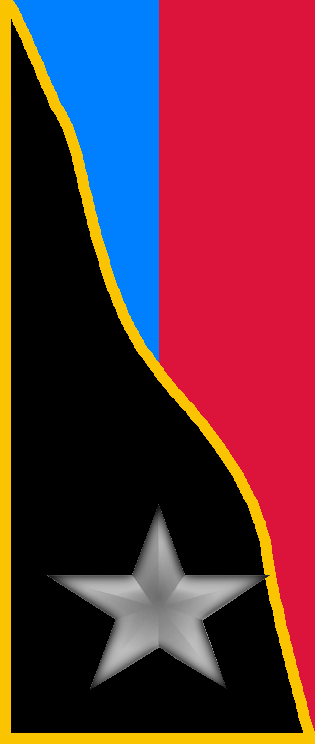
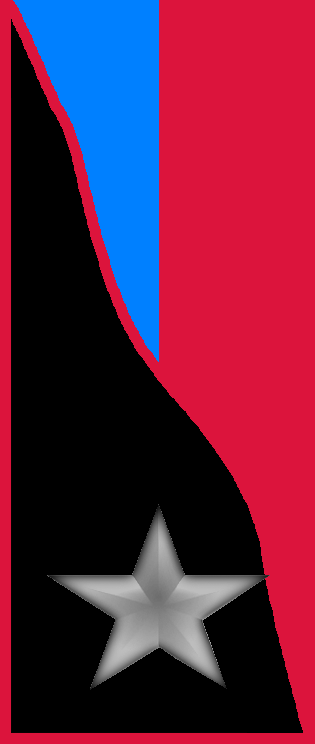
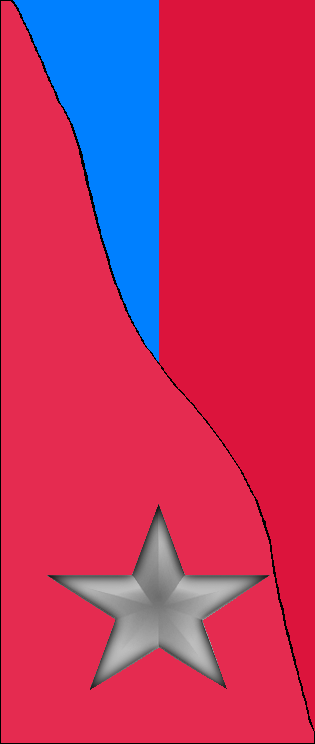
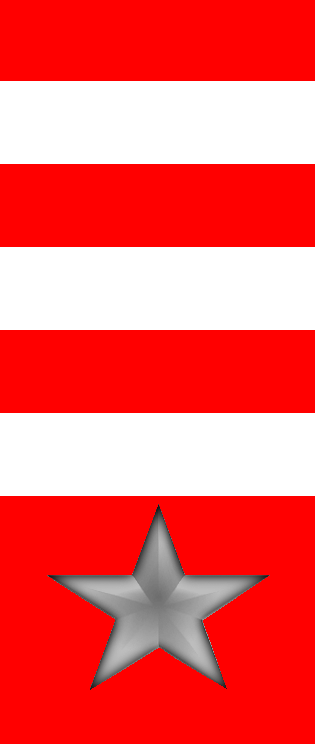
- Identification symbol: Perugia Division gorget patches

The 151st Infantry Division "Perugia" (Italian: 151ª Divisione di fanteria "Perugia") was an infantry division of the Royal Italian Army during World War II. The Perugia was formed on 25 August 1941 and named for the city of Perugia. The Perugia was classified as an occupation infantry division, which meant that the division's artillery regiment consisted of two artillery groups instead of the three artillery groups of line infantry divisions and that the divisional mortar battalion was replaced by a divisional machine gun battalion.

The Perugia was sent to Dalmatia, then Montenegro and finally Albania. Following the announcement of the Armistice of Cassibile on 8 September 1943 the division marched from its bases to the Albanian coast, where some thousand men could be evacuated by ship to Italy, but the majority of the division was left behind and captured by the Germans after fierce fighting by the Germans. Immediately after their capture the Germans executed all officers and non-commissioned officers of the division, including the division's commander General Ernesto Chiminello.

== History ==
=== World War I ===
The division's lineage begins with the Brigade "Perugia" raised on 1 March 1915 with the 129th and 130th infantry regiments. The brigade fought on the Italian front in World War I and together with its regiments was disbanded after the war in January 1920.

=== World War II ===
The 151st Infantry Division "Perugia" was activated in Perugia on 25 August 1941 and consisted of the 129th Infantry Regiment "Perugia", 130th Infantry Regiment "Perugia", and the 151st Artillery Regiment "Perugia". As a division raised during the war the Perugia did not have its own regimental depots and therefore its regiments were raised by the depots of the 22nd Infantry Division "Cacciatori delle Alpi": the 129th Infantry Regiment "Perugia" was raised in Perugia on 12 August 1941 by the 51st Infantry Regiment "Cacciatori delle Alpi" and the 130th Infantry Regiment "Perugia" was raised in Spoleto on 14 August 1941 by the 52nd Infantry Regiment "Cacciatori delle Alpi", while the 151st Artillery Regiment "Perugia" was raised by the 1st Artillery Regiment "Cacciatori delle Alpi" in Foligno.

==== Dalmatia ====
The division left its bases in Umbria on 7 December 1941 and was shipped from Bari to Split in Dalmatia, where the division arrived on 10 December. The Perugia's headquarters was at Split, with its units in Split, Šibenik, Trogir, and Sinj and its area of responsibility included the islands along the Dalmatian coast and the territory inland up to the mountain passes to Bosnia and Herzegovina. The division found itself immediately engaged by Yugoslav partisans, with the Perugia undertaking large scale anti-partisan operations from February to April 1942 and the partisans striking relentlessly the Split-Šibenik railway and the key roads in the area.

==== Montenegro ====
In late July 1942 the Perugia moved to Cetinje in Montenegro and was responsible for the territory between Lake Skadar and the Bay of Kotor. The Perugia garrisoned the Gruda, Mrčine, Crkvice, Ledenice, Kotor and Grabovac. The division was instantly attacked by the local partisan forces with intense, incessant fighting occurring in the mountainous area around Grahovo and Vilusi. In May–June 1943 the division participated in the Battle of Sutjeska.

==== Albania ====
In August 1943 the division moved to Gjirokastër in southern Albania. The division garrisoned the cities of Gjirokastër and Delvinë with the 129th Infantry Regiment and the cities of Këlcyrë and Tepelenë with the 130th Infantry Regiment. After the Armistice of Cassibile was announced on 8 September 1943 the Perugia was attacked by German forces and Albanian partisans. The Perugia's commander ordered his troops to move to the coast and embark to Italy. To achieve this the division split in two formations: one marching from Gjirokastër to Sarandë and the other from Tepelenë to Vlorë. Heavy German attacks prevent this maneuver and the division tried to concentrate on 14 September around Tepelenë, but on the way there both formations found themselves under constant attacks by German forces and heavily harassed by partisan formations, which tried to take possession of the Perugia's weapons and materiel.

After the failure to unite its forces at Tepelenë the division returned to the original plan and both formations battled their way out of the Albanian mountains towards the coast. The survivors of the 130th Infantry Regiment reached Vlorë and set up a defensive perimeter, which managed to withstand the German attacks until 20 September 1943. The remnants of the 129th Infantry Regiment, together with the division's command, reached Sarandë, where the Germans besieged the Italians. Approximately 1,000 men could be shipped back to Italy with the vessels in the harbor. No help from Italy or the Allies arrived and so between 3–5 October the German 1st Mountain Division overran most of the Perugia's positions and immediately executed all captured officers and non-commissioned officers - 120 in total, including the division's commander Ernesto Chiminello. On 7 October the Germans captured the last positions of the Perugia in the mountains near Kuç and executed another 32 officers and non-commissioned officers.

About 170 survivors of the division joined the Albanian partisans and formed with the survivors of the 41st Infantry Division "Firenze" and 53rd Infantry Division "Arezzo" the Antonio Gramsci Battalion. The battalion fought with the Albanian National Liberation Army until the Germans retreated from Albania. The battalion paraded under arms through Tirana on 28 November 1944 and the survivors were repatriated to Italy in May 1945.

== Organization ==
151st Infantry Division "Perugia" organization

- 151st Infantry Division "Perugia"
  - Headquarters
    - Command Company
    - 111th Carabinieri Section
    - 112th Carabinieri Section
    - 151st Field Post Office
    - 151st Infantry Division Command Transport Squad
  - 129th Infantry Regiment "Perugia"
    - Command Company
    - 3 × Fusilier battalions
    - Support Weapons Battery (65/17 mod. 13 infantry support guns)
    - Mortar Company (81mm Mod. 35 mortars)
  - 130th Infantry Regiment "Perugia"
    - Command Company
    - 3 × Fusilier battalions
    - Cannons Company (47/32 mod. 35 anti-tank guns)
    - Mortar Company (81mm Mod. 35 mortars)
  - 151st Artillery Regiment "Perugia"
    - Command Unit
    - I Group (100/22 mod. 14/19 howitzers; formed by the depot of the 1st Artillery Regiment "Cacciatori delle Alpi")
    - II Group (100/22 mod. 14/19 howitzers; formed by the depot of the 26th Artillery Regiment "Pavia", transferred on 25 November 1941 to the 153rd Artillery Regiment "Macerata")
    - II Group (75/27 mod. 06 field guns; assigned to the regiment on 25 November 1941)
    - III Group (75/27 mod. 06 field guns)
    - 1 × Anti-aircraft battery (20/65 Mod. 35 anti-aircraft guns)
    - Ammunition and Supply Unit
  - CLI Machine Gun Battalion
  - CLI Mortar Battalion (81mm Mod. 35 mortars; formed in 1942)
  - CLI Mixed Engineer Battalion
    - 151st Engineer Company
    - 251st Telegraph and Radio Operators Company
  - 151st Anti-Tank Company (47/32 mod. 35 anti-tank guns)
  - 121st Medical Section
    - 137th Field Hospital
    - 1 × Field hospital
    - 1 × Surgical unit
  - 151st Supply Section
  - 540th Transport Section

Attached to the division in 1943:

- XIV Machine Gun Battalion
- CXIV Guardia alla Frontiera Machine Gun Battalion
- CXLIV CC.NN. Battalion

== Commanding officers ==
The division's commanding officers were:

- Generale di Divisione Riccardo Pentimalli (25 August 1941 - 1 July 1943)
- Generale di Brigata Ernesto Chiminello (2 July 1942 - 4 October 1943; executed by the Germans)
