= 207th Coastal Division =

Royal Italian Army infantry division during World War II

- Active: 1941 – 1943
- Country: Kingdom of Italy
- Branch: Royal Italian Army
- Size: Division
- Garrison/HQ: Agrigento
- Engagements: World War II

Insignia
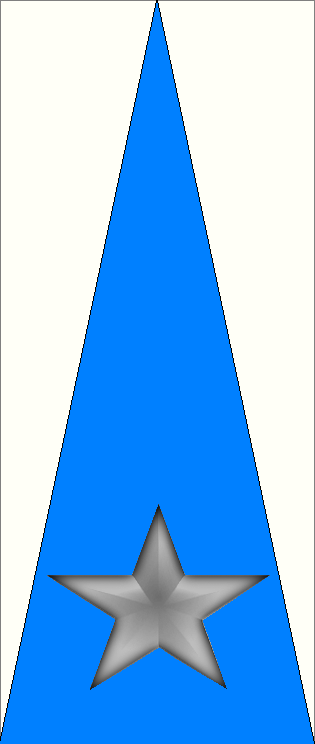
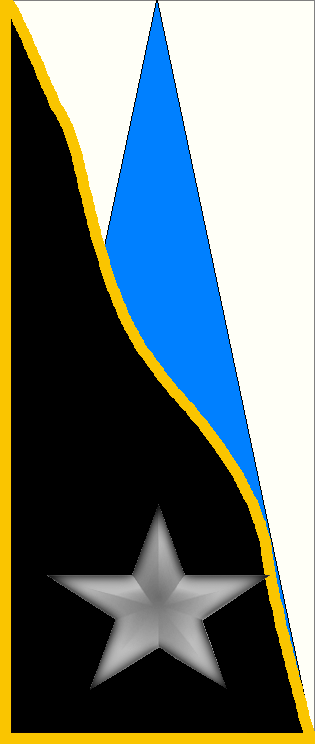
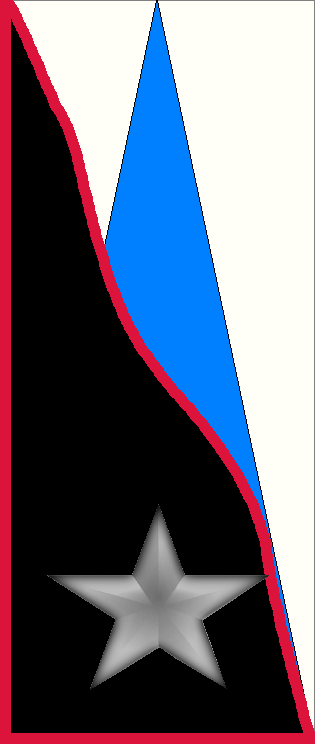
- Identification symbol: 207th Coastal Division gorget patches

The 207th Coastal Division (Italian: 207ª Divisione Costiera) was an infantry division of the Royal Italian Army during World War II. Royal Italian Army coastal divisions were second line divisions formed with reservists and equipped with second rate materiel. Recruited locally, they were often commanded by officers called out of retirement.

== History ==
The division was activated on 15 November 1941 in Palermo by reorganizing the VII Coastal Sector Command. The division was assigned to XII Army Corps, which was responsible for the defense of the western half of the island of Sicily. In January 1942 the division moved its headquarter to Agrigento. The division was responsible for the coastal defense of the coast between Sciacca and Punta Due Rocche to the East of Licata.

The division fought against units of the American Seventh Army after the allies landed on Sicily on 10 July 1943. By 16 July 1943 the division had been severely decimated and was therefore officially declared lost due to wartime events.

== Organization ==
- 207th Coastal Division, in Agrigento
  - 138th Coastal Regiment
    - CCCLXXX Coastal Battalion
    - CCCLXXXVIII Coastal Battalion
    - CDXV Coastal Battalion
    - CDXVII Coastal Battalion
    - CDXX Coastal Battalion
  - 139th Coastal Regiment, in Licata
    - LXII Replacements Battalion
    - CDXIX Coastal Battalion
    - CCCXC Coastal Battalion
  - 12th Coastal Artillery Regiment
    - XXXV Coastal Artillery Group (3 × 105/28 and 1 × 75/27 mod. 06 batteries)
    - CXLV Coastal Artillery Group (2 × 105/28 and 1 × 75/34 mod. S.F. batteries)
    - CLX Coastal Artillery Group (2 × 149/35 and 1 × 105/27 mod. 06 batteries)
    - CCXXIII Coastal Artillery Group (2 × 100/22 mod. 14/19 batteries)
  - CIX Machine Gun Battalion
    - 510th Machine Gun Company
    - 516th Machine Gun Company
  - 207th Carabinieri Section
  - 164th Field Post Office
  - Division Services

Attached to the division:

- 177th Bersaglieri Regiment
  - DXXV Bersaglieri Battalion (formed by the 3rd Bersaglieri Regiment)
  - DXXVI Bersaglieri Battalion (formed by the 6th Bersaglieri Regiment)
  - DXXVII Bersaglieri Battalion (formed by the 2nd Bersaglieri Regiment)
- CIV Anti-tank Battalion (47/32 mod. 35 anti-tank guns)
- CCXXIII Artillery Group (joined the 12th Coastal Artillery Regiment upon being assigned to the division)
- LXXXVIII Guardia alla Frontiera Artillery Group (attached until the 12th Coastal Artillery Regiment joined the division)
- Armored Train 120/3/S, in Porto Empedocle (4 × 120/45 Mod. 1918 naval guns, 4 × 20/77 Scotti anti-aircraft guns)
- Armored Train 76/1/T, in Porto Empedocle (6 × 76/40 Mod. 1916 naval guns, 4 × 20/77 Scotti anti-aircraft guns)
- Armored Train 76/2/T, in Licata (4 × 76/40 Mod. 1916 naval guns, 4 × 20/77 Scotti anti-aircraft guns)

== Commanding officers ==
The division's commanding officers were:

- Generale di Divisione Antonio Calierno (15 November 1941 - 30 November 1942)
- Generale di Brigata Ottorino Schreiber (1 December 1942 - 11 July 1943)
- Generale di Brigata Augusto De Laurentiis (12 July - 16 July 1943, POW)
