= Ugo de Carolis =

Italian Brigadier-General

- Born: 7 October 1887; Capua, Italy
- Died: 12 December 1941 (aged 54); Stalino, Soviet Union
- Military career
- Allegiance: Kingdom of Italy
- Branch: Royal Italian Army
- Rank: Brigadier-General
- Commands: 52nd Infantry Division "Torino"
- Conflicts: World War II: Battle of Chazepetovka †
- Awards: Gold Medal of Military Valor; Knight's Cross of the Iron Cross

Ugo de Carolis (born 1887 – 12 December 1941) was an Italian Brigadier-General and commander of the 52nd Infantry Division "Torino" on the eastern front during World War II. He was a recipient of the Knight's Cross of the Iron Cross.

== Awards ==
- Medaglia d'oro al valor militare
- Knight's Cross of the Iron Cross on 9 February 1942 as Generale di brigada and commander of the Italian 52nd Infantry Division "Torino"

== See also ==
- Italian Expeditionary Corps in Russia
