= 1st Artillery Regiment "Cacciatori delle Alpi" =

Inactive Italian Army artillery unit

- 1° Reggimento Artiglieria "Cacciatori delle Alpi"
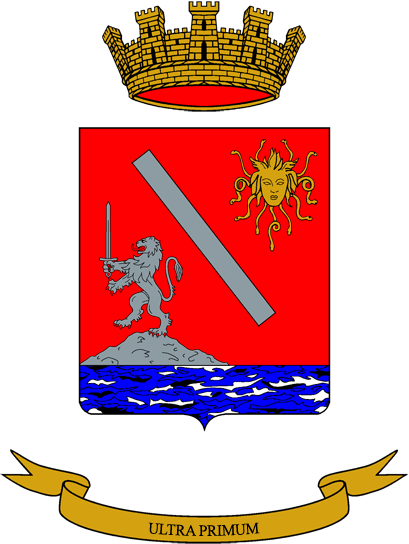
- Regimental coat of arms
- Active: 1 Jan. 1871 — 11 Sept. 1943; 1 Dec. 1948 — April 1953; 10 May 1953 — 31 Dec. 1958; 2 May 1976 — 12 Nov. 1999
- Country: Italy
- Branch: Italian Army
- Part of: Artillery School
- Garrison/HQ: Bracciano
- Motto: "Ultra primum"
- Anniversaries: 15 June 1918 - Second Battle of the Piave River

Insignia
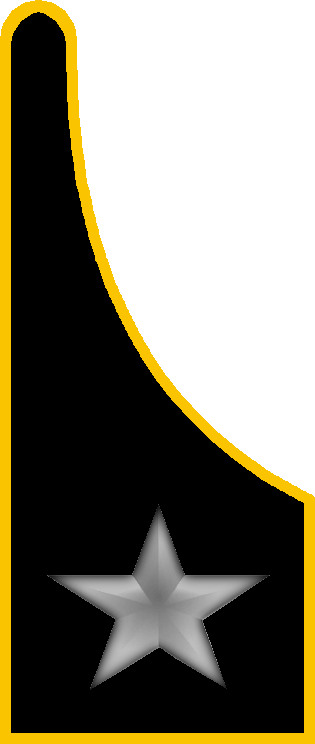
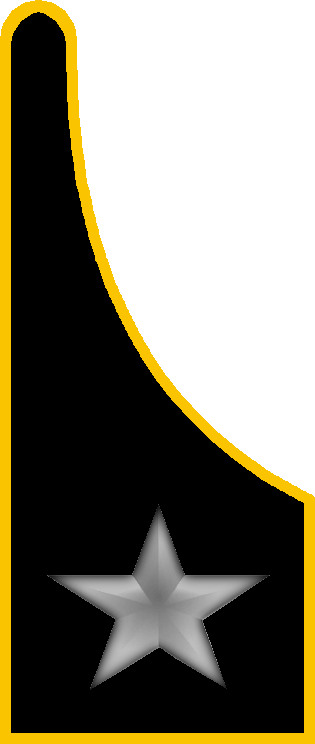
- Regimental gorget patches

The 1st Artillery Regiment "Cacciatori delle Alpi" (Italian: 1° Reggimento Artiglieria "Cacciatori delle Alpi") is an inactive field artillery regiment of the Italian Army, which was based in Bracciano in Lazio. The regiment was formed in 1871 by the Royal Italian Army. During World War I the regiment served on the Italian front. In 1935 the regiment was assigned to the 22nd Infantry Division "Cacciatori delle Alpi", with which the regiment served in the Greco-Italian War of World War II. In July 1941 the division was sent to occupied Yugoslavia on occupation duty. After the announcement of the Armistice of Cassibile on 8 September 1943 the division and its regiments were disbanded on 11 September by invading German forces.

The regiment was reformed in 1948 and assigned to the Infantry Division "Granatieri di Sardegna". In April 1953 the regiment was disbanded so its flag could be transferred on 10 May 1953 to the 1st Armored Artillery Regiment "Pozzuolo del Friuli" in Civitavecchia. The regiment was assigned to the Armored Division "Pozzuolo del Friuli" until division and regiment were disbanded on 31 December 1958. In 1976 the unit was reformed in Bracciano as 1st Self-propelled Field Artillery Group "Cacciatori delle Alpi" and assigned to the Artillery School. In 1981 the group was renamed 1st Artillery Group "Cacciatori delle Alpi" and continued to serve as the Artillery's School's training and demonstration unit until 12 November 1999, when it was disbanded. The regimental anniversary falls, as for all Italian Army artillery regiments, on June 15, the beginning of the Second Battle of the Piave River in 1918.

This article is about the Royal Italian Army's 1st Field Artillery Regiment, which was a support unit assigned to a division-level command. This regiment is unrelated to the 1st Heavy Field Artillery Regiment, which was a support unit assigned to a corps-level command, and unrelated to the 1st Heavy Artillery Regiment, which was a support unit assigned to an army-level command.

== History ==
On 1 January 1871 the 11th Artillery Regiment was formed in Foligno. The new regiment consisted of five fortress companies, which had been ceded by the 4th Artillery Regiment, and eight field batteries, three of which had been ceded by the 5th Artillery Regiment, two by the 7th Artillery Regiment, and another three by the 8th Artillery Regiment. Two of the ceded batteries had fought in the First Italian War of Independence, Second Italian War of Independence, the Piedmontese invasion of Central and Southern Italy, the Third Italian War of Independence and one of the two had also participated in 1870 in the capture of Rome. On 30 September 1873 the regiment ceded four fortress companies to help form the 12th Fortress Artillery Regiment.

On 1 January 1874 the army's Sappers Corps was split and the staff and the depot of the 1st Artillery Regiment - Pontieri in Pavia were used to reform the 1st Engineer Regiment. Consequently the 11th Artillery Regiment was renumbered as 1st Artillery Regiment on the same date. On 1 June 1882 the regiment was renamed 1st Field Artillery Regiment. On 1 November 1884 the regiment ceded two batteries to help from the 12th Field Artillery Regiment and on 1 November 1888 the regiment ceded eight batteries and one train company to help form the 13th Field Artillery Regiment.

In 1895-96 the regiment provided two officers and 156 troops to help form two batteries and to augment units deployed to Eritrea for the First Italo-Ethiopian War. During the Italo-Turkish War in 1911-12 the regiment provided four officers and 87 troops to help form a group command and one battery. The regiment also provided 111 troops to complement the 22nd Field Artillery Regiment and 24th Field Artillery Regiment, which had been mobilized for the war. On 1 January 1915 the regiment ceded its II Group to help form the 33rd Field Artillery Regiment.

=== World War I ===
At the outbreak of World War I the regiment was assigned to the IX Army Corps as the corps' artillery regiment. At the time the regiment consisted of a command, three groups with a combined eight batteries equipped with 75/27 mod. 11 field guns, a reserve pack battery with 70/15 mountain guns, and a depot. During the war the regiment's depot in Foligno formed the commands of the 37th Field Artillery Regiment and 55th Field Artillery Regiment. The depot also formed the commands of the 101st Mountain Battery, 266th Siege Battery, and 609th Siege Battery and in 1917 it provided troops to help form the 56th Field Artillery Regiment. During the war the regiment fought in the Dolomites: in 1915 on the summits of the Tofane, on Col di Lana, and in the area of the San Pellegrino Pass, while in 1916 the regiment was deployed in the Val Travignolo and on the ridges of the Monte Castelletto, before fighting at Costabella for the mountains of Cima Bocche and Colbricon. In 1917 the regiment was deployed on the glaciers of the Marmolada, before being moved to the Monte Sief, and then falling back to the Monte Grappa massive after the Battle of Caporetto. During the battles of Monte Grappa the regiment was in November 1917 on Monte Tomba and at Monfenera and in January 1918 on Monte Asolone. In May and June 1918 the regiment fought on Col della Berretta and Col Caprile, before returning to the Monte Grappa, where the regiment remained until the end of the war.

In 1926 the regiment was assigned to the 22nd Territorial Division of Perugia and consisted of a command, one group with 100/17 mod. 14 howitzers, two groups with 75/27 mod. 06 field guns, one group with mule-carried 75/13 mod. 15 mountain guns, and a depot. On 1 October 1934 one of the regiment's groups with 75/27 mod. 06 field guns was disbanded and replaced by a group with 75/13 mod. 15 mountain guns, whose personnel had been transferred from the 19th Field Artillery Regiment. In January 1935 the 22nd Territorial Division of Rome was renamed 22nd Infantry Division "Cacciatori delle Alpi" and consequently the regiment was renamed 1st Artillery Regiment "Cacciatori delle Alpi". In 1935 the regiment formed the XXX Train Group for the Second Italo-Ethiopian War. The regiment also provided six officers and 321 enlisted to augment deployed units.

On 1 October 1938 the regiment ceded one of its groups with 75/13 mod. 15 mountain guns to help reform the 52nd Artillery Regiment "Torino". On 7 December 1938 the regiment was granted the right to wear a red tie with the formal uniform, an honor, which was meant to continue Giuseppe Garibaldi's tradition of clothing his volunteers, to which the Cacciatori delle Alpi had belonged, in red shirts. The same honor had already been bestowed on the infantry regiments of the Brigade "Alpi" in 1919.

=== World War II ===
On 1 September 1939 the regiment's depot formed a group with 75/13 mod. 15 mountain guns to help reform the 34th Artillery Regiment "Sassari". On 10 June 1940, the day Italy entered World War II, the regiment consisted of a command, command unit, one group with 100/17 mod. 14 howitzers, one group with 75/27 mod. 06 field guns, one group with 75/13 mod. 15 mountain guns, and an anti-aircraft battery with 20/65 mod. 35 anti-aircraft guns. The regiment was assigned to the 22nd Infantry Division "Cacciatori delle Alpi", which also included the 51st Infantry Regiment "Alpi" and 52nd Infantry Regiment "Alpi".

In early January 1941 the division was sent to Albania to reinforce the crumbling Italian front during the Greek offensive in the Greco-Italian War. For the war the regiment was reorganized and consisted now of a command, command unit, one group with 100/17 mod. 14 howitzers, and two groups with 75/18 mod. 35 howitzers. On 21 January the division entered the front with the task to block Greek attacks. By 28 January the Greeks had succeeded in breaking the Cacciatori's line and the severely decimated division gave way and retreated north. Only with the German invasion of Greece in April 1941 did the Italians military manage to drive the Greek forces back and by 28 April 1941 the division had reached the Greek near Ersekë.

In July 1941 the division was transferred to Montenegro for garrison duties and in September of the same year the division was deployed to Croatia. For the next two years the division was engaged in combat with Yugoslav Partisans. The division was in Slovenia when the Armistice of Cassibile was announced on 8 September 1943 and was disbanded by invading German forces on 11 September 1943.

=== Cold War ===
==== 1st Field Artillery Regiment ====
On 1 December 1948 the 1st Field Artillery Regiment was reformed in L'Aquila and consisted of a command, a command unit, and the I and II groups with QF 25-pounder field guns. The regiment was assigned to the Infantry Division "Granatieri di Sardegna" and on 10 April 1949 it formed the III Group with QF 25-pounder field guns, which was already disbanded on 1 April 1950. In 1951 the regiment formed the III Light Anti-aircraft Group with 40/56 anti-aircraft autocannons and an anti-tank sub-grouping with the IV and V anti-tank groups with QF 17-pounder anti-tank guns. Afterwards the regiment consisted of the following units:

- 1st Field Artillery Regiment, in L'Aquila
  - Command Unit
  - I Group with QF 25-pounder field guns
  - II Group with QF 25-pounder field guns
  - III Light Anti-aircraft Group with 40/56 anti-aircraft autocannons
  - Anti-tank Sub-grouping
    - IV Anti-tank Group with QF 17-pounder anti-tank guns
    - V Anti-tank Group with QF 17-pounder anti-tank guns

==== 1st Armored Artillery Regiment "Pozzuolo del Friuli" ====
On 1 February 1953 the Artillery Recruits Advanced Training Center in Civitavecchia formed two groups with M7 Priest self-propelled guns and one group with M36 tank destroyers for the 133rd Armored Artillery Regiment. The regiment was activated on 31 March 1953, but did not receive either name or number. In April it was decided to disbanded the 1st Field Artillery Regiment and transfer its number and traditions to the new regiment. Consequently in April 1953 the regiment in L'Aquila was disbanded and most of its groups were transferred to the 13th Field Artillery Regiment. On 10 May 1953 the regiment in Civitavecchia was designated 1st Armored Artillery Regiment "Pozzuolo del Friuli" and received the flag and traditions of the 1st Artillery Regiment "Cacciatori delle Alpi". The regiment was assigned to the Armored Division "Pozzuolo del Friuli" and consisted of the following units:

- 1st Armored Artillery Regiment "Pozzuolo del Friuli", in Civitavecchia
  - Command Unit
  - I Self-propelled Group with M7 Priest self-propelled guns
  - II Self-propelled Group with M7 Priest self-propelled guns
  - IV Self-propelled Anti-tank Group with M36 tank destroyers
  - V Light Anti-aircraft Group with 40/56 autocannons

In 1955 the regiment added a III Self-propelled Group with M7 Priest self-propelled guns while the IV and V groups were merged to form the Mixed Group, which fielded two light anti-aircraft batteries with 40/56 autocannons and one self-propelled anti-tank battery with M36 tank destroyers. The same year the regiment formed a Light Aircraft Section with L-21B artillery observation planes, which on the following year was expanded to Light Aircraft Unit. Also in 1956 the self-propelled anti-tank battery with M36 tank destroyers was disbanded.

In 1958 the army decided to disbanded the Armored Division "Pozzuolo del Friuli" and consequently the groups of the regiment were transferred to other units: on 1 May the I Group was transferred to the 11th Field Artillery Regiment and on 30 November the II Group to the 33rd Field Artillery Regiment. On 22 December the Mixed Group was disbanded and on the last day of the year, 31 December 1958, the III Group was transferred to the 13th Field Artillery Regiment, while the Light Aircraft Unit was transferred to the 4th Armored Infantry Regiment. Afterwards the 1st Armored Artillery Regiment "Pozzuolo del Friuli" was disbanded and the flag of the 1st Artillery Regiment "Cacciatori delle Alpi" was transferred to the Shrine of the Flags in the Vittoriano in Rome.

==== 1st Artillery Group "Cacciatori delle Alpi" ====
During the 1975 army reform the army disbanded the regimental level and newly independent battalions and groups were granted for the first time their own flags. On 2 May 1976 the VIII Army Corps Self-propelled Artillery Group of the Artillery School in Bracciano was renamed 1st Self-propelled Artillery Group "Cacciatori delle Alpi". The group consisted of a command, a command and services battery, two batteries with M44 self-propelled howitzers, one battery with M109G self-propelled howitzers, and one section with MGM-52 Lance tactical surface-to-surface missile launchers. The group served as the Artillery School's experimentation and demonstration unit for self-propelled artillery systems, while the 18th Field Artillery Group "Gran Sasso", which had been formed on the same date, served as the Artillery School's experimentation and demonstration unit for towed artillery systems. On 12 November 1976 the President of the Italian Republic Giovanni Leone assigned with decree 846 the flag and traditions of the 1st Artillery Regiment "Cacciatori delle Alpi" to the group.

On 31 March 1981 the 18th Field Artillery Group "Gran Sasso" was disbanded and the next day the 1st Self-propelled Artillery Group "Cacciatori delle Alpi" was reorganized and renamed 1st Artillery Group "Cacciatori delle Alpi". The group consisted now of the following units:

- 1st Artillery Group "Cacciatori delle Alpi", in Bracciano
  - Command and Services Battery
  - 1st Battery with M114 howitzers
  - 2nd Battery with FH70 howitzers
  - 3rd Battery with M109G self-propelled howitzers
  - 4th Battery with M44 self-propelled howitzers

In 1982 the M44 self-propelled howitzers were taken out of service by the Italian Army and the 4th Battery was tasked with the development of the British-German-Italian SP70 self-propelled howitzer. After that project failed in 1986 the 4th Battery received M270 MLRS launchers, which signalled the introduction of that system in the Italian Army. In 1989 the 4th Battery was disbanded and its M270 MLRS transferred to the 3rd Missiles Artillery Group "Volturno". The same year the group added the Artillery Specialists Battery and the Transport and Maintenance Battery.

On 12 November 1999 the 1st Artillery Group "Cacciatori delle Alpi" was disbanded and the flag of the 1st Artillery Regiment "Cacciatori delle Alpi" was once more deposited at the Shrine of the Flags in the Vittoriano in Rome.
