= Cima Bocche =

Mountain in Italy

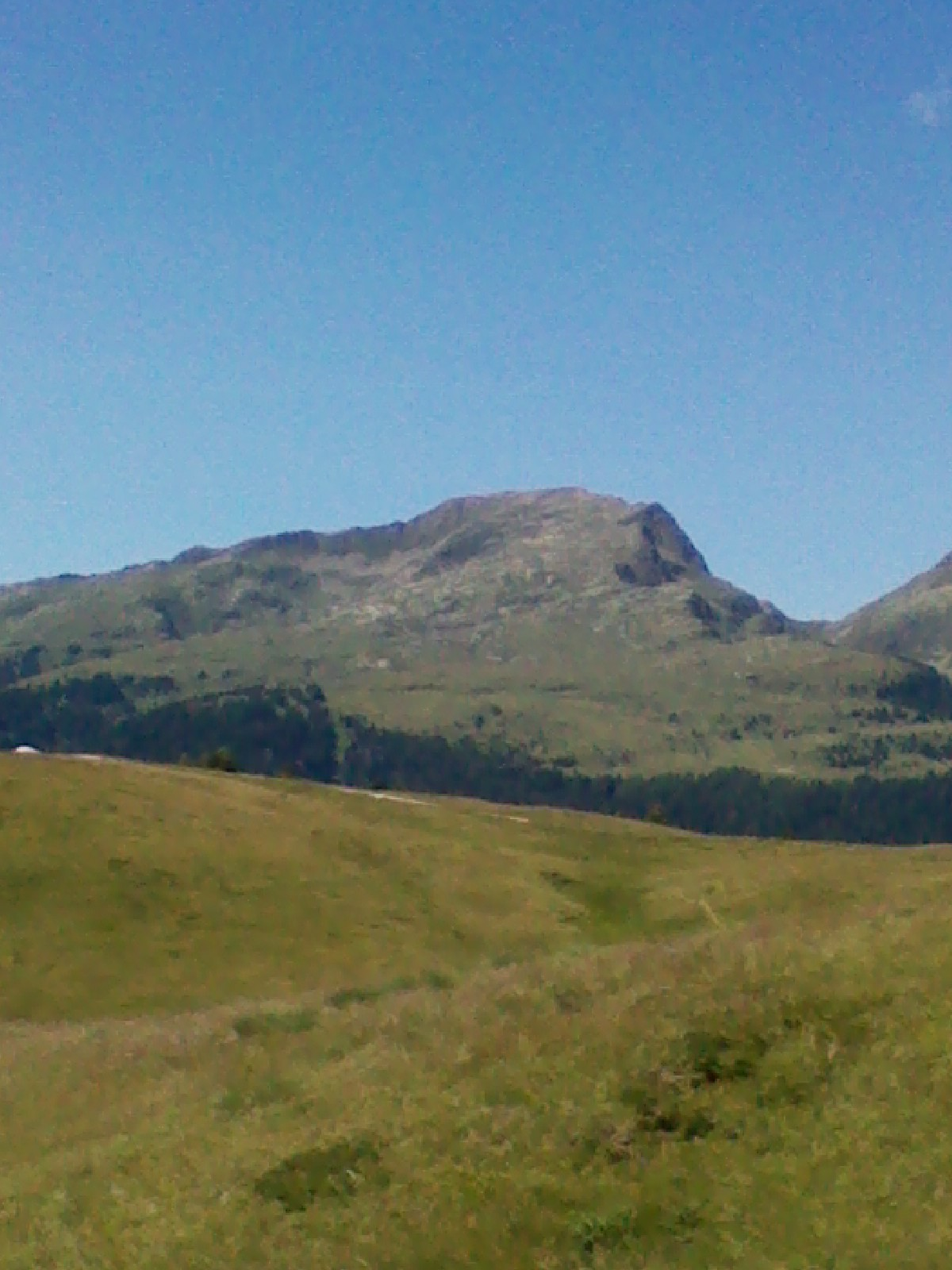
- Cima Bocche from Rolle Pass

Highest point
- Elevation: 2,745 m (9,006 ft)
- Prominence: 714 m (2,343 ft)
- Coordinates: 46°21′N 11°45′E

Geography
- Location within Alps
- Location: Trentino, Italy
- Parent range: Dolomites

Cima Bocche (2,745 m) is a mountain of the Dolomites in Trentino, Italy. It is the highest peak of a small group that is located between the San Pellegrino Pass and the Predazzo valley. The mountain has a vertical 400m north face, whereas its southern slopes are far more gentle, making it an easy climb from this direction. Despite being geographically part of the Dolomites, the mountain is not geologically part of the range, as it is formed of Porphyry rather than dolomite.

== World War I ==
The mountain was on the Italian Front during the Great War due to its strategically important position with views towards the San Pellegrino Pass and the Valles Pass. An old fort still stands on the summit and trenches and support ropes can still be found on its slopes.
