= Rozoy-sur-Serre =

- Commune
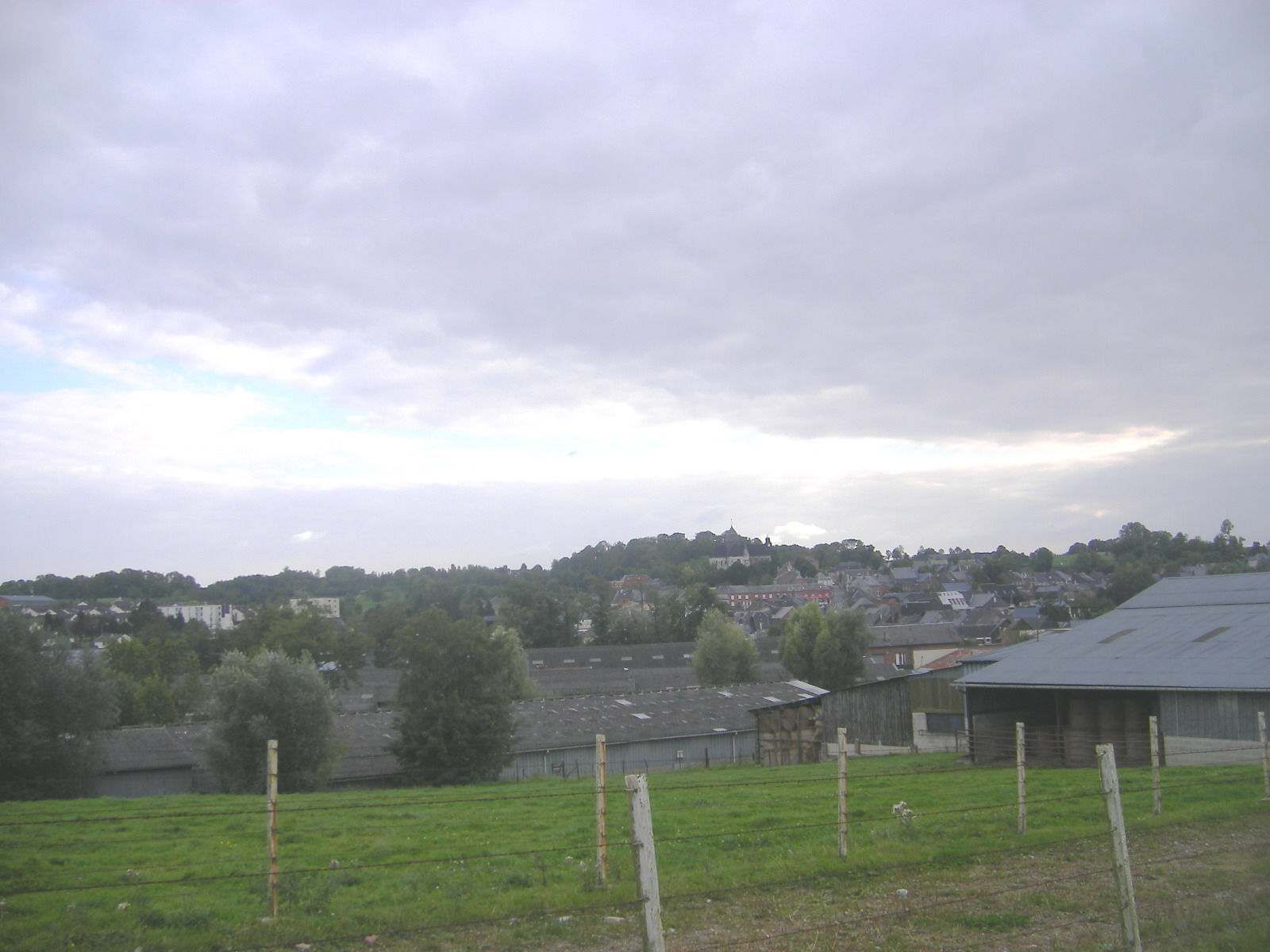
- A general view of Rozoy-sur-Serre

- Coat of arms
- Location of Rozoy-sur-Serre
- Location within France Location within Hauts-de-France
- Coordinates: 49°42′35″N 4°07′44″E
- Country: France
- Region: Hauts-de-France
- Department: Aisne
- Arrondissement: Vervins
- Canton: Vervins

Government
  - Mayor (2026–32): Jean-René Durtette
- Area^{1}: 16.53 km^{2} (6.38 sq mi)
- Elevation: 148 m (486 ft)
- Highest elevation: 232 m (761 ft)
- Lowest elevation: 131 m (430 ft)
- Population (2023): 917
  - Density: 55.5/km^{2} (144/sq mi)
- Time zone: UTC+01:00 (CET)
  - Summer (DST): UTC+02:00 (CEST)
- INSEE/Postal code: 02666 /02360
- ^{1} French Land Register data, which excludes lakes, ponds, glaciers > 1 km^{2} (0.386 sq mi or 247 acres) and river estuaries.

Rozoy-sur-Serre (French pronunciation: [ʁozwa syʁ sɛʁ], literally Rozoy on Serre) is a commune in the Aisne department in Hauts-de-France in northern France.

== Population ==
Historical population
Year	Pop.	±% p.a.
1968	1,201	—
1975	1,315	+1.30%
1982	1,187	−1.45%
1990	1,095	−1.00%
1999	1,079	−0.16%
2007	1,048	−0.36%
2012	1,023	−0.48%
2017	1,007	−0.31%
2023	917	−1.55%
Source: INSEE

== See also ==
- Communes of the Aisne department
