= Ernesto Chiminello =

Italian general (1890–1943)

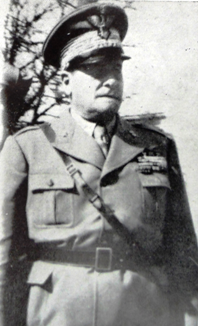
- Born: 4 December 1890; Pizzo, Kingdom of Italy
- Died: 4 October 1943 (aged 52); Sarande, Albania
- Military career
- Allegiance: Kingdom of Italy
- Branch: Royal Italian Army
- Rank: Major General
- Commands: 22nd Infantry Regiment; 3rd Infantry Regiment; Ragusa Military District; Alessandria Military Zone; 33rd Infantry Division Acqui; 151st Infantry Division Perugia
- Conflicts: World War I; World War II; Operation Achse
- Awards: Order of the Crown of Italy; Order of Saints Maurice and Lazarus

Ernesto Chiminello (4 December 1890 – 4 October 1943) was an Italian general during World War II.

== Biography ==
He was born on December 4, 1890, and enlisted in the Royal Italian Army as officer cadet, becoming an infantry second lieutenant in 1908. Between 1912 and 1913 he fought in Libya, being promoted to lieutenant on September 6, 1913. He fought on the Italian front during the First World War, being promoted to captain on 9 September 1915.

After the end of hostilities he attended the Italian Army War School, later holding the position of Deputy Chief of Staff of the Bologna Army Corps. He then commanded the 22nd Infantry Regiment, the 3rd Infantry Regiment and the military district of Ragusa in 1938. On June 3, 1932 he was made a Knight of the Order of Saints Maurice and Lazarus.

After serving as Chief of Staff of the 32nd Infantry Division Marche, he became commander of the military zone of Alessandria. On 1 July 1940, after Italy's entry into World War II, he was promoted to the rank of Brigadier General. In July 1941 he was appointed president of the commission tasked with defining the new borders of Montenegro. On 25 October 1942, after promotion to Major General, he assumed command of the 33rd Infantry Division Acqui, stationed in Kefalonia, a post he held until 16 June 1943.

On 15 August of the same year, after a short period at the disposal of the Florence Army Corps, he was sent to Albania as commander of the 151st Infantry Division Perugia. The Armistice of Cassibile, on 8 September 1943, found him in Gjirokastra, where the division's headquarters were located; the division was deployed near the border with Greece, in the area between Përmet, Klisura and Tepelene. Upon hearing the news of the armistice, the divisional command unanimously decided to resist the Germans, even with the use of weapons.

On 9 September Chiminello met a German envoy, and an agreement was reached stating that his troops would remain in Gjirokastra, together with a small contingent of German soldiers, and that in case of movement the division would go to Vlore. The deputy commander of the division, Brigadier General Giuseppe Adami, in command of the Tepelene sector, entered into negotiations with the Albanian partisans, with Chiminello's approval (through the mediation of Major Bill Tilman, British liaison with the partisans, a pact was made stating that Adami's troops would join the partisans in the mountains and fight the Germans alongside them; this was also approved by Chiminello), but between 10 and 11 September the Albanians surrounded the town. After this Chiminello left Adami free to behave as he saw fit, and the latter left for Vlore with his troops.

On 13 September more Italian units arrived in Gjirokastra, while the small German garrison present in the town was despatched to Vlore. On the following day the Albanian partisans issued an ultimatum for the surrender of all weapons and the disarmament of the division, which was rejected, and then launched an assault on the Italian positions, which was repelled with the loss of some five hundred partisans. At dawn on 16 September, about 5,000 men of the division, led by Chiminello, left for Sarande, which was free from the Germans, arriving there on 22 September after clashing with the partisans and being joined on the route by runaway Italian prisoners from other units (such as the 49th Infantry Division Parma) which had been disarmed by the Germans. Over the next two days, ships sent from Italy loaded part of the soldiers, starting with the wounded and the former prisoners, but there was not room for everyone, and Luftwaffe attacks prevented the sending of more ships. On 24 September the division left for Himara, where the arrival of more ships had been promised to pick up the remaining men, arriving there on the 27 September, but the ships never came, and the troops were stopped and disarmed by the partisans and then attacked by the 1st Gebirgsjager Division (also responsible, in the previous days, of the massacre of the Acqui Division on Kefalonia; among those executed had been General Antonio Gandin, Chiminello's successor at the command of the Acqui Division). Part of the soldiers were captured, part dispersed and took to the mountains. General Chiminello, who according to survivors appeared tired and depressed, hid in the woods together with other officers until 3 October, when he decided to surrender to the Germans. He was sentenced to death by a German drumhead court-martial and shot on the following day on a beach north of Sarande together with his chief of staff, Major Sergio Bernardelli. Another 118 officers from the Perugia Division were executed between 5 and 7 October in Kuc and Sarande; the corpses were carried offshore and thrown into the sea after stones had been tied to their legs.
