= 52nd Infantry Division "Torino" =

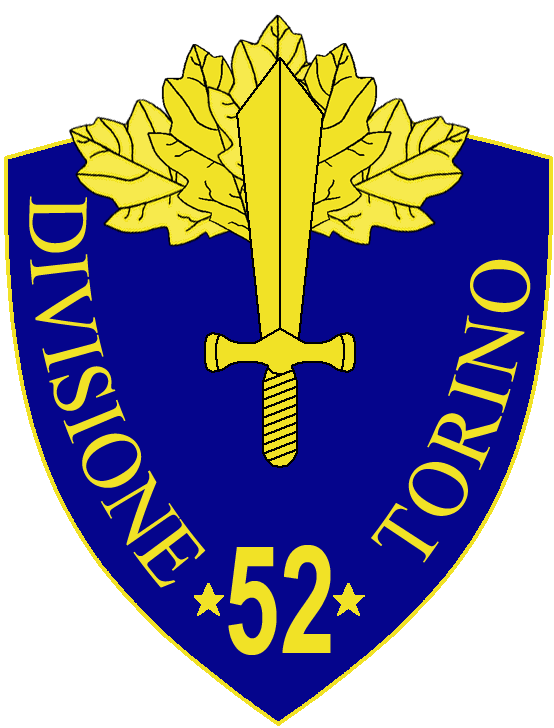
- 52nd Infantry Division "Torino" insignia
- Active: 1940–1943
- Country: Kingdom of Italy
- Branch: Royal Italian Army
- Role: Infantry
- Size: Division
- Engagements: World War II

Commanders
- Notable commanders: Ugo de Carolis

Insignia
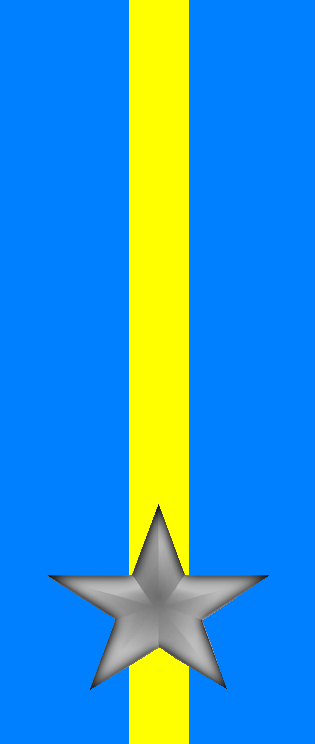
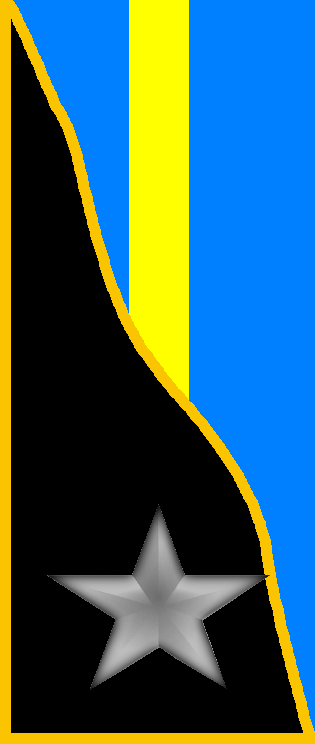
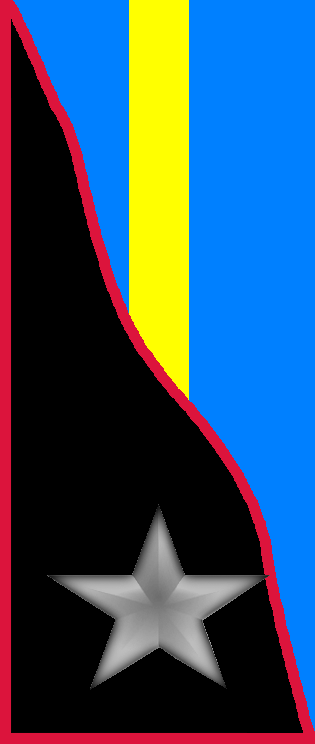
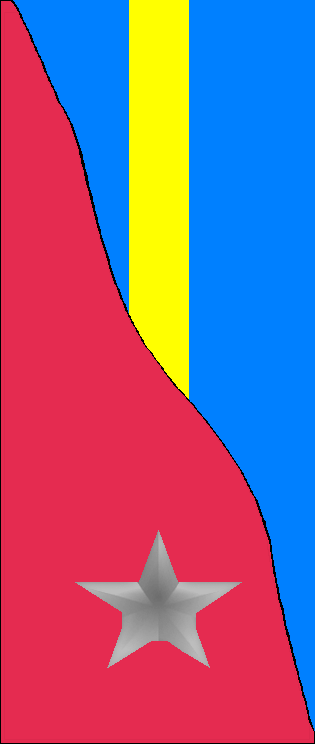
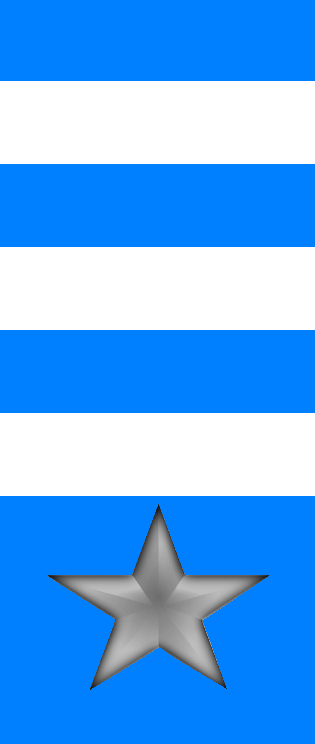
- Identification symbol: Torino Division gorget patches

The 52nd Infantry Division "Torino" (Italian: 52ª Divisione di fanteria "Torino") was an infantry division of the Royal Italian Army during World War II. The Torino was named after the city of Turin (Italian: Torino) and classified as an auto-transportable division, meaning it had some motorized transport, but not enough to move the entire division at once. The division was formed by expanding the Torino Brigade in June 1940 and was based with two of its regiments in Civitavecchia, while the 81st Infantry Regiment "Torino" was based in Rome. The division took part in the Invasion of Yugoslavia and was then sent to the Eastern front as part of the Italian Expeditionary Corps in Russia.

== History ==
The division's lineage begins with the Brigade "Torino" established in Turin on 1 November 1884 with the 81st and 82nd infantry regiments.

=== World War I ===
The brigade fought on the Italian front in World War I. On 25 November 1926 the brigade and 82nd Infantry Regiment "Torino" were disbanded, while the 81st Infantry Regiment "Torino" was assigned to the XXII Infantry Brigade of the 22nd Territorial Division of Perugia.

In March 1938 the Central Military Schools Command in Civitavecchia assumed a dual training/operational role and changed its name to Central Military Schools Command - Infantry Division "Torino" and received the 81st Infantry Regiment "Torino" from the 22nd Infantry Division "Cacciatori delle Alpi". On 1 July 1938 the Central Military Schools Command's Central Infantry School re-raised the 82nd Infantry Regiment "Torino", while the Central Artillery School re-raised the 52nd Artillery Regiment on 1 October 1938.

On 5 June 1940 the division split from the Central Military Schools Command and activated as 52nd Infantry Division "Torino", with the 81st and 82nd infantry regiments, and the 52nd artillery regiment.

=== World War II ===
==== Yugoslavia ====
On 6 April 1941 the division participated in the invasion of Yugoslavia departing from Ilirska Bistrica and Podgrad. On the 12th the division moved through Sušak and then proceeded southwards along the Dalmatian coast. After taking the cities of Šibenik and Split it reached Dubrovnik, where it linked up with the 131st Armored Division "Centauro", which had advanced North from Italian-occupied Albania. In early July the division returned to Civitavecchia.

==== Soviet Union ====
In July 1941 the division was assigned to the Italian Expeditionary Corps in Russia and left Rome on 10 July 1941. On 13 August it reached Shaikhani in Ukraine and was subordinated to the German 1st Panzer Group. On 17 September it deployed to the right of the 3rd Cavalry Division "Principe Amedeo Duca d'Aosta" in the Dnjepropetrowsk area on the Dnieper river, where it was immediately engaged by enemy units. Between 27 and 30 September 1941, the division participated in the Battle of Petrikowka. Between 20 October and 2 November 1941, the division assaulted the city of Stalino (today Donetsk) in Eastern Ukraine, and occupied the neighbouring towns of Horlivka and Yenakiieve.

In November the Torino was on the Krynka river to protect the southern flank of the 3rd Cavalry Division and on 6 December it attacked Chazepetowka and reach the village after two days of struggle. On 12 December 1941 the division's commander General Ugo de Carolis was killed and posthumously awarded the Knight's Cross by the Germans. On 25-26 December the division faced Russian attacks at Malo Orlovka and, in the course of a counter attacks, occupied Plosky and Vife Ostraja, where it repelled violent enemy counterattacks.

The Torino remained with 1st Panzer Army until 3 June 1942 when it was subordinated to the German 17th Army. In July 1942 it entered the newly arrived Italian Army in Russia/8th Army, which formed the left flank of the German 6th Army during the Battle of Stalingrad. The 8th Army suffered heavy losses during the Soviet Operation Little Saturn in winter of 1942/43 and was destroyed by March 1943. Some 8,000 men of the 13,500 men of the Torino were killed or missing in Russia, including 2,814 of the 81st Infantry Regiment, 2,608 of the 82nd Infantry Regiment, 1,283 of the 52nd Artillery Regiment, 483 of the XXVI Mortar Battalion, 208 of the LII Mortar Battalion, 154 of the 52nd Transmission Company, 114 of the 171st Anti-Tank Company, and 102 of the 52nd Medical Section.

The survivors of the division returned to Italy, where on 1 June 1943 the 159th Infantry Division "Veneto" was renamed 52nd Infantry Division "Torino". The reformed Torino was disbanded by the Germans following the Armistice of Cassibile.

== Organization ==
52nd Infantry Division "Torino" organization in 1940

When the division was deployed to Russia it consisted of the following units:

- 52nd Infantry Division "Torino", in Civitavecchia
  - Headquarters
    - Command Company
    - 56th Carabinieri Section
    - 66th Carabinieri Section
    - 152nd Field Post Office
    - 52nd Infantry Division Command Transport Squad
  - 81st Infantry Regiment "Torino", in Rome
    - Command Company
    - 3 × Fusilier battalions
    - Support Weapons Battery (65/17 mod. 13 infantry support guns)
    - Mortar Company (81mm mod. 35 mortars)
  - 82nd Infantry Regiment "Torino", in Civitavecchia
    - Command Company
    - 3 × Fusilier battalions
    - Support Weapons Battery (65/17 mod. 13 infantry support guns)
    - Mortar Company (81mm mod. 35 mortars)
  - 52nd Artillery Regiment "Torino", in Civitavecchia
    - Command Unit
    - I Group (100/17 mod. 14 howitzers)
    - II Group (75/27 mod. 11 field guns)
    - III Group (75/27 mod. 11 field guns)
    - 10th Anti-aircraft Battery (20/65 mod. 35 anti-aircraft guns; replaced by the 352nd Anti-aircraft Battery during the deployment in the Soviet Union)
    - 11th Anti-aircraft Battery (20/65 mod. 35 anti-aircraft guns; joined the regiment on 1 September 1941; replaced by the 361st Anti-aircraft Battery during the deployment in the Soviet Union)
    - 74th Anti-tank Battery (75/39 anti-tank guns; attached during the deployment in the Soviet Union)
    - Ammunition and Supply Unit
  - XXVI Mortar Battalion (81mm mod. 35 mortars, detached from the 26th Infantry Division "Assietta")
  - LII Mortar Battalion (81mm mod. 35 mortars)
  - 52nd Anti-tank Company (47/32 mod. 35 anti-tank guns)
  - 171st Anti-tank Company (47/32 mod. 35 anti-tank guns; transferred from the 1st Cavalry Division "Eugenio di Savoia" for the deployment in the Soviet Union)
  - 52nd Telegraph and Radio Operators Company
  - 57th Engineer Company
  - 185th Heavy Transport Unit (attached for the deployment in the Soviet Union)
    - 815th Heavy Transport Section
    - 834th Heavy Transport Section
  - 52nd Medical Section
    - 89th Field Hospital
    - 90th Field Hospital
    - 117th Field Hospital
    - 578th Field Hospital
    - 52nd Surgical Unit
  - 52nd Supply Section (expanded to 52nd Supply Unit for the deployment to the Soviet Union)
  - 56th Transport Section

Attached from early 1941 to July 1941:

- 63rd CC.NN. Legion "Tagliamento"
  - Command Company
  - LXIII CC.NN. Battalion
  - LXXIX CC.NN. Battalion
  - 63rd CC.NN. Machine Gun Company

== Military honors ==
For their conduct during the Italian campaign in the Soviet Union the President of Italy awarded on 31 December 1947 to the three regiments of the 52nd Infantry Division "Torino" Italy's highest military honor, the Gold Medal of Military Valor.

- 81st Infantry Regiment "Torino" on 31 December 1947
- 82nd Infantry Regiment "Torino" on 31 December 1947
- 52nd Artillery Regiment "Torino" on 31 December 1947

== Commanding officers ==
The division's commanding officers were:

- Generale di Divisione Mario Priore (1 November 1938 – 1 September 1939)
- Generale di Divisione Gabriele Nasci (2 September - 30 November 1939)
- Generale di Divisione Mario Arisio (1 December 1939 - 9 June 1940)
- Generale di Divisione Luigi Manzi (10 June 1940 – 7 January 1942)
- Generale di Brigata Francesco Dupont (acting, 8 January 1942 - 15 February 1942)
- Generale di Divisione Roberto Lerici (16 February 1941 - 26 August 1942)
- Generale di Brigata Ottorino Schreiber (acting, 27 August 1942 - 14 September 1942)
- Generale di Divisione Roberto Lerici (15 September 1942 - 30 January 1943)
- Colonel Giovanni Lattanzi (31 January - 3 March 1943)
- Colonel Bruno Gemelli (acting, 4 March 1943 - 17 March 1943)
- Colonel Giovanni Lattanzi (18 March 1943 - 31 March 1943)
- Generale di Brigata Luigi Krall (1 June 1943 - 15 August 1943
- Generale di Divisione Bruno Malaguti (16 August 1943 - 13 September 1943)

== See also ==
- Italian participation in the Eastern Front
- Italian Army in Russia
