= Bernese Alps in the wide meaning =

Mountain range in Switzerland

- German: Berner Alpen i.w.S. French: Alpes Bernoises d.l.s.l.
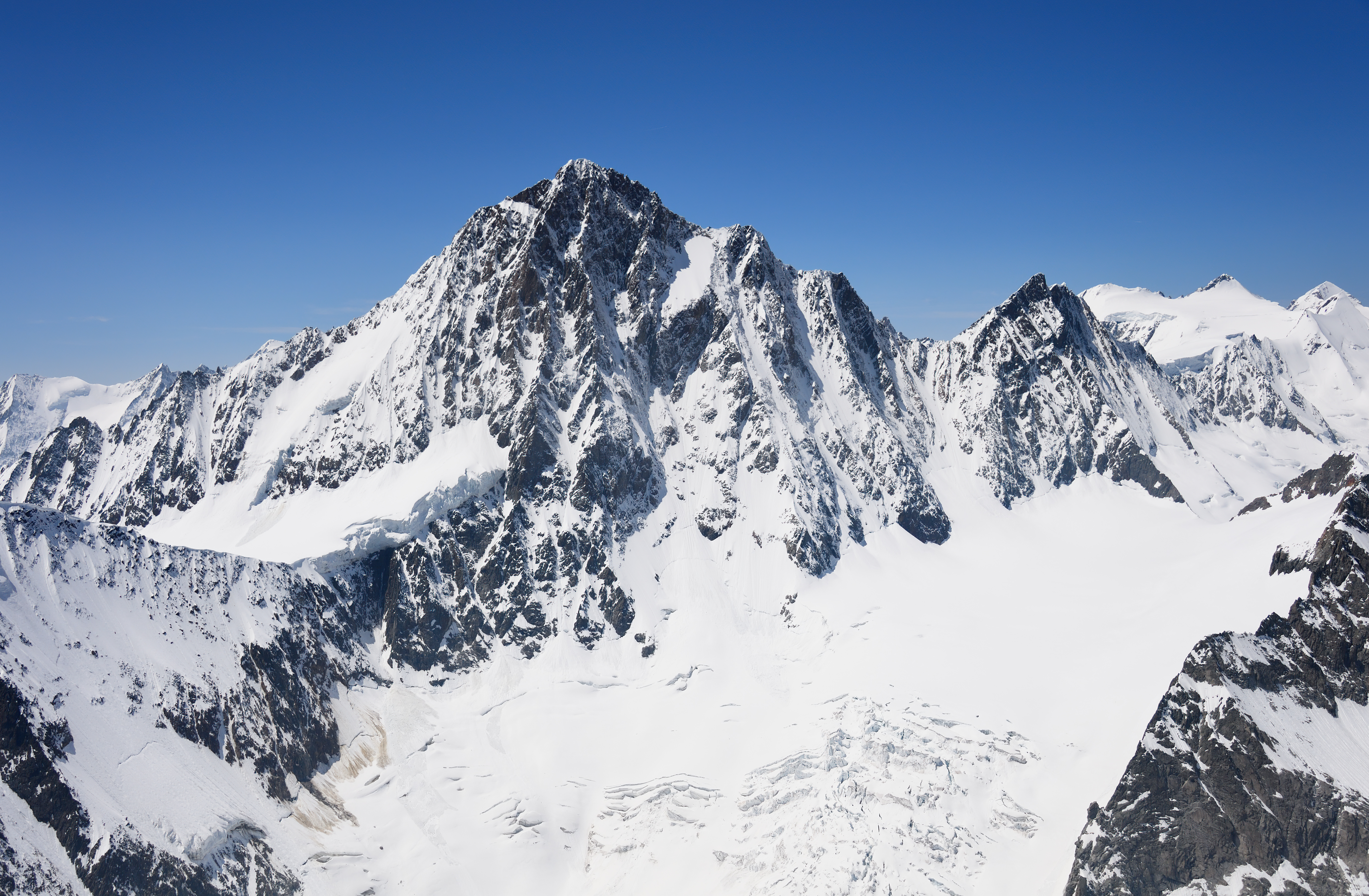
- Aerial view on the Finsteraarhorn (4275m)

Highest point
- Peak: Finsteraarhorn
- Elevation: 4,274 m (14,022 ft)
- Coordinates: 46°21′15″N 8°07′34″E

Geography
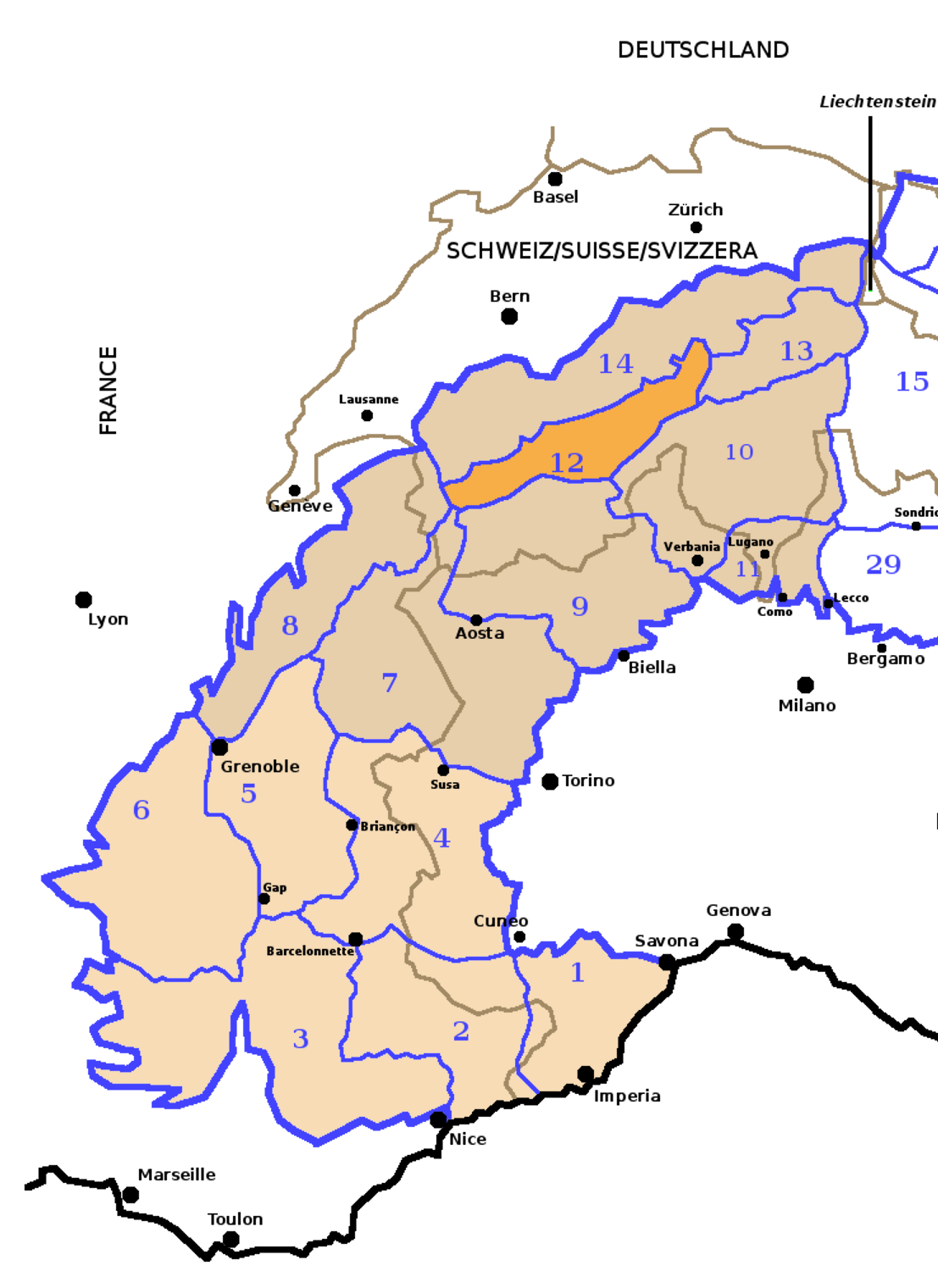
- Bernese Alps i.w.s. (section nr. 12) within the Western Alps
- Country: Switzerland
- Cantons: Bern, Vaud, Valais, Lucerne, Uri, Nidwalden and Obwalden
- Parent range: Alps
- Borders on: Lepontine Alps, Pennine Alps, Graian Alps, Savoy Prealps, Swiss Prealps and Glarus Alps i.t.w.m.

Geology
- Orogeny: Alpine orogeny

The Bernese Alps in the wide meaning (in German Berner Alpen i.w.S., in French Alpes Bernoises D.l.s.l.) are a mountain range in the northwestern part of the Alps. They are located in Switzerland.

== Geography ==
The range covers parts of several Swiss cantons: Bern, Vaud, Valais, Lucerne, Uri, Nidwalden and Obwalden.

=== SOIUSA classification ===
According to SOIUSA (International Standardized Mountain Subdivision of the Alps) the range is an Alpine section, classified in the following way:

- Main part = Western Alps
- Major sector = North Western Alps
- Section = Bernese Alps i.t.w.m.
- code = I/B-12

=== Subdivision ===
The range is divided into three subsections:

- Urner Alps (in German Urner Alpen) - SOIUSA code:I/B-12.I;
- Bernese Alps s.s. (in German Berner Alpen i.e.S.) - SOIUSA code:I/B-12.II;
- Vaud Alps - SOIUSA code:I/B-12.III.

== Notable summits ==
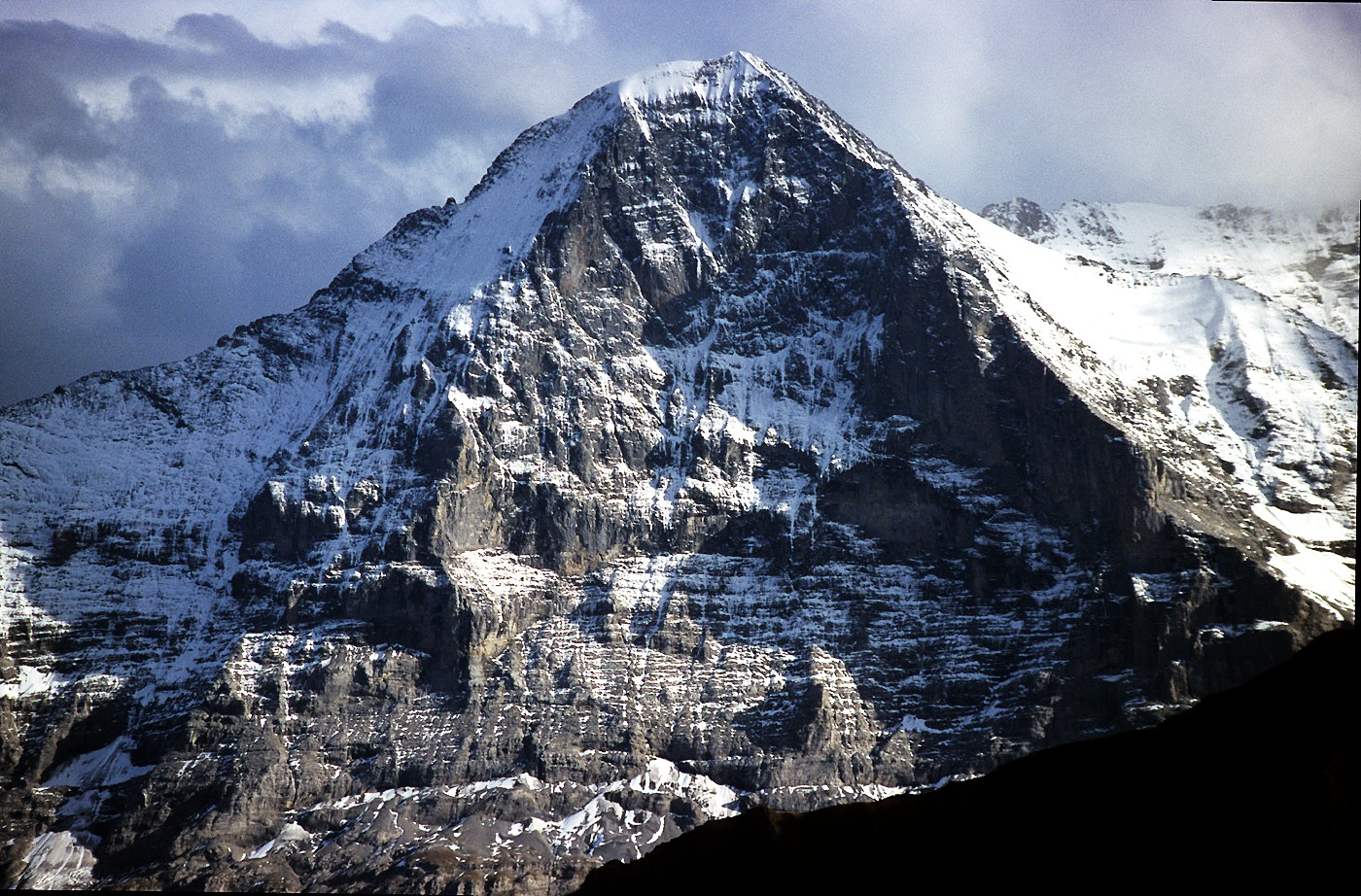
Eiger north face

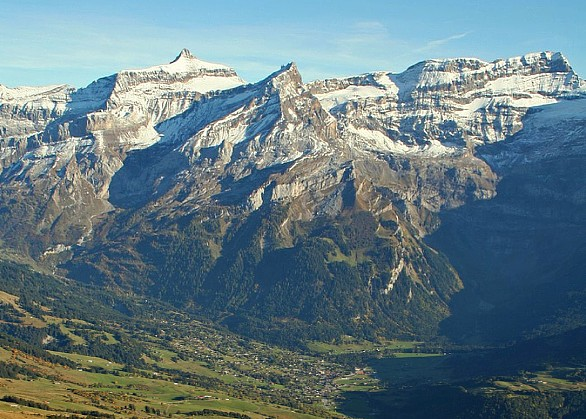
The Diablerets from the Pic Chaussy

Some notable summits of the range are:

Name	Elevation (m)	Alpine subsection
Finsteraarhorn	4,274	Bernese Alps s.s.
Aletschhorn	4,193	Bernese Alps s.s.
Jungfrau	4,158	Bernese Alps s.s.
Mönch	4,105	Bernese Alps s.s.
Schreckhorn	4,080	Bernese Alps s.s.
Fiescherhorn	4,049	Bernese Alps s.s.
Grünhorn	4,043	Bernese Alps s.s.
Lauteraarhorn	4,042	Bernese Alps s.s.
Gletscherhorn	3,983	Bernese Alps s.s.
Eiger	3,967	Bernese Alps s.s.
Äbeni Flue	3,962	Bernese Alps s.s.
Fiescher Gabelhorn	3,876	Bernese Alps s.s.
Doldenhorn	3,643	Bernese Alps s.s.
Dammastock	3,630	Urner Alps
Galenstock	3,583	Urner Alps
Sustenhorn	3,503	Urner Alps
Titlis	3,238	Urner Alps
Les Diablerets	3,210	Vaud Alps
Grand Muveran	3,051	Vaud Alps
Lohner	3,048	Bernese Alps s.s.
Wendenstöcke	3,042	Urner Alps
Sparrhorn	3,021	Bernese Alps s.s.
Torrenthorn	2,998	Bernese Alps s.s.
Dent de Morcles	2,980	Vaud Alps
Eggishorn	2,934	Bernese Alps s.s.

== Notable passes ==
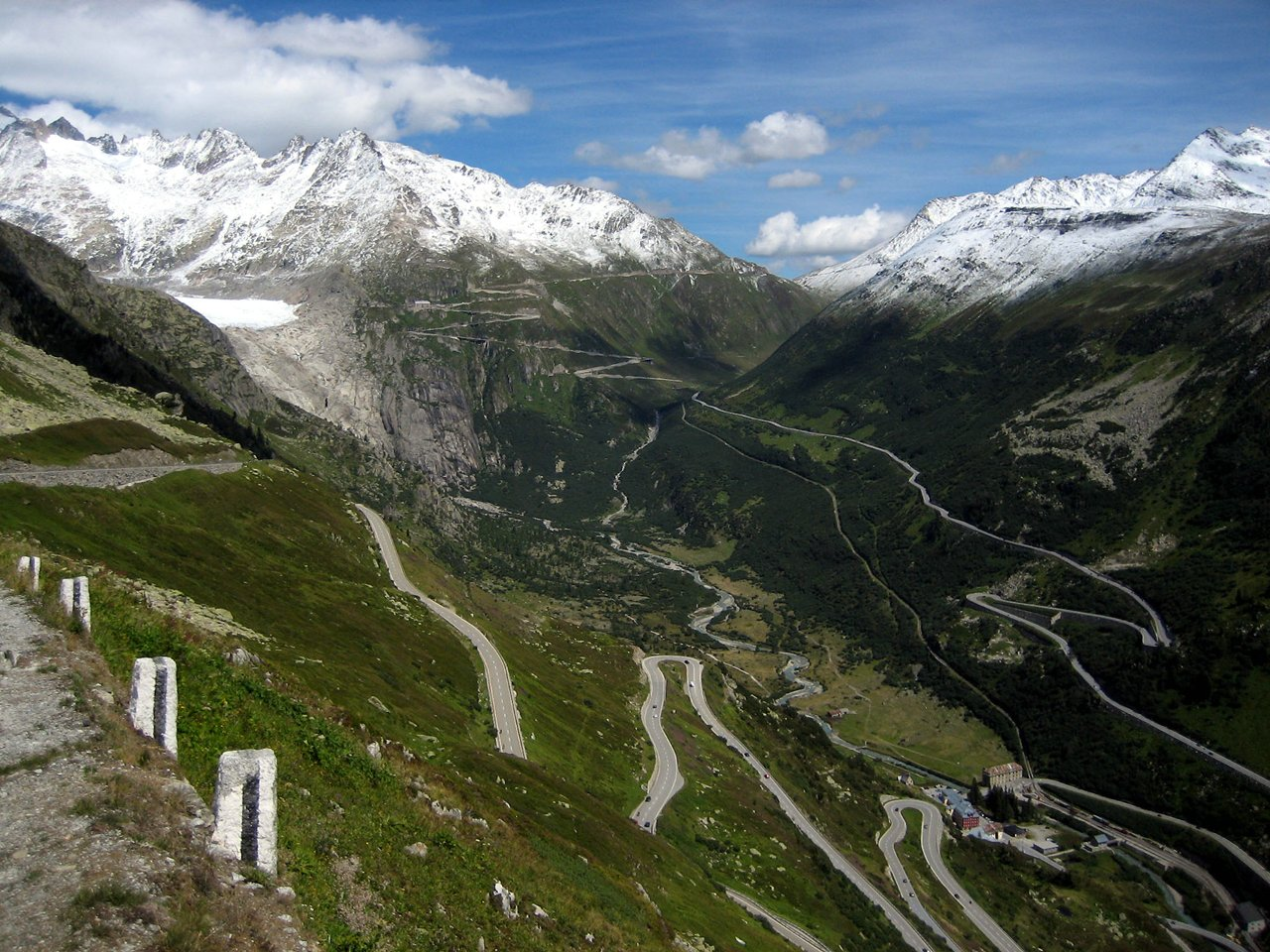
Furka pass west side

Some notable mountain passes of the range are:

Name	Route (from/to)		Type	Elevation	
Furka Pass	Rhône Glacier	Andermatt	Road	2436 m	7992 ft
Gemmi Pass	Kandersteg	Leukerbad	Bridle path	2329 m	7641 ft
Mönchjoch	Grindelwald	Eggishorn	Snow	3560 m	11,680 ft
Jungfraujoch	Wengernalp	Eggishorn	Snow	3470 m	11,385 ft
Grünhornlücke	Great Aletsch Glacier	Fiescher Glacier	Snow	3305 m	10,844 ft
Grimsel Pass	Meiringen	Rhone Glacier	Road	2164 m	7100 ft
Kleine Scheidegg	Grindelwald	Lauterbrunnen	Path, railway	2064 m	6772 ft
Col de Cheville	Sion	Bex	Bridle path	2049 m	6723 ft
Grosse Scheidegg	Grindelwald	Meiringen	Road (restricted to bus traffic)	1967 m	6454 ft
Brünig Pass	Meiringen	Lucerne	Road, railway	1035 m	3396 ft
Petersgrat	Lauterbrunnen	Lötschental	Snow	3205 m	10,516 ft
Lötschenlücke	Lötschental	Eggishorn	Snow	3204 m	10,512 ft
Susten Pass	Meiringen	Wassen	Road	2262 m	7422 ft
Sanetsch Pass	Sion	Saanen	Bridle path	2234 m	7331 ft

== Maps ==
- Swiss official cartography (Swiss Federal Office of Topography - Swisstopo); on-line version: map.geo.admin.ch
