= Schönbühlhorn =

Mountain in Switzerland

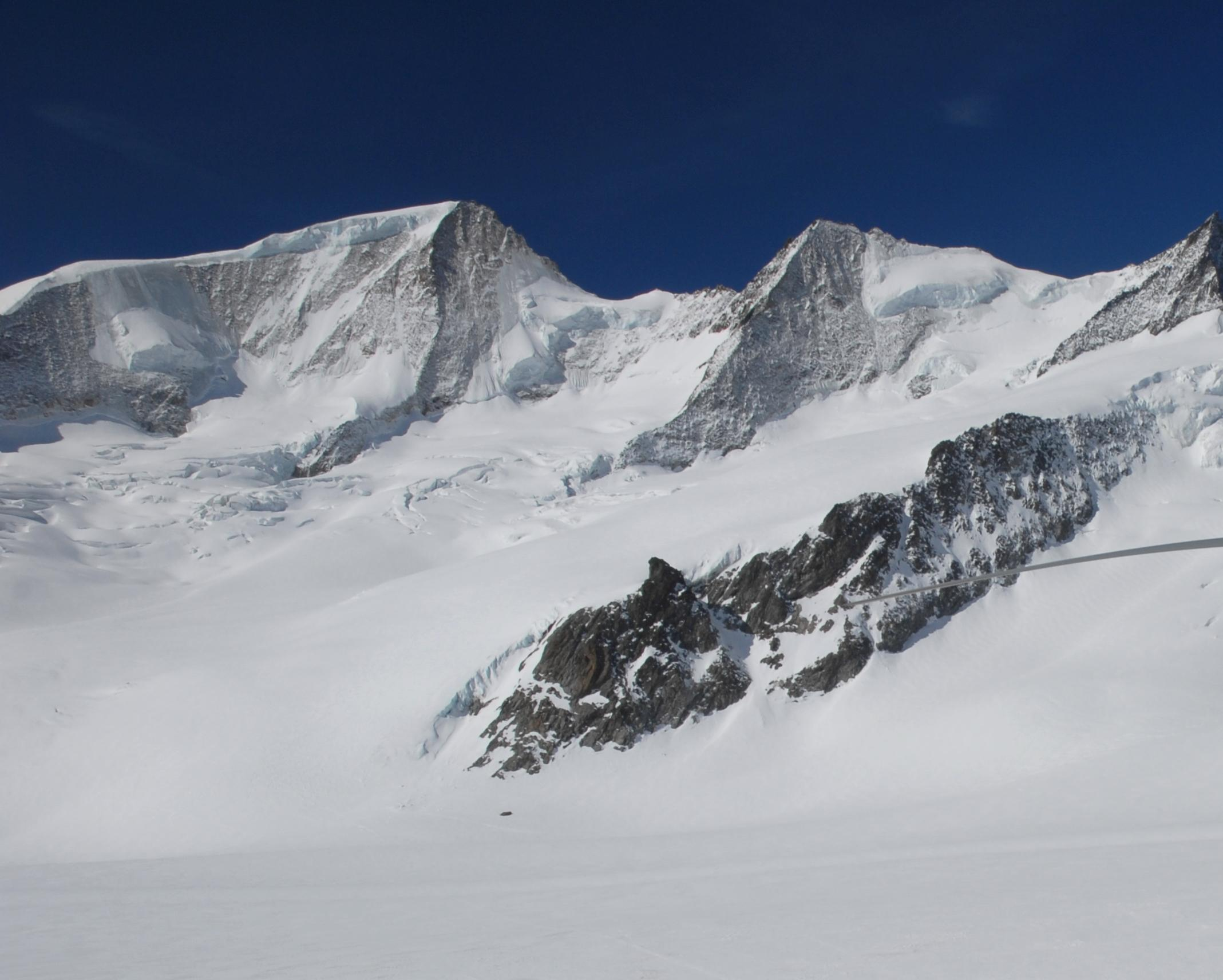
- Gross Wannenhorn (left) and Schönbühlhorn (right) from the east side

Highest point
- Elevation: 3,854 m (12,644 ft)
- Prominence: 92 m (302 ft)
- Parent peak: Fiescher Gabelhorn
- Coordinates: 46°29′53.5″N 8°5′29.5″E

Geography
- Location within Switzerland
- Location: Valais, Switzerland
- Parent range: Bernese Alps

The Schönbühlhorn (3,854 m) is a mountain in the Bernese Alps, overlooking the Aletsch Glacier in the canton of Valais. It lies on the range south of the Grünhornlücke, that culminates at the Gross Wannenhorn.
