= Vordersee =

Lake in Switzerland

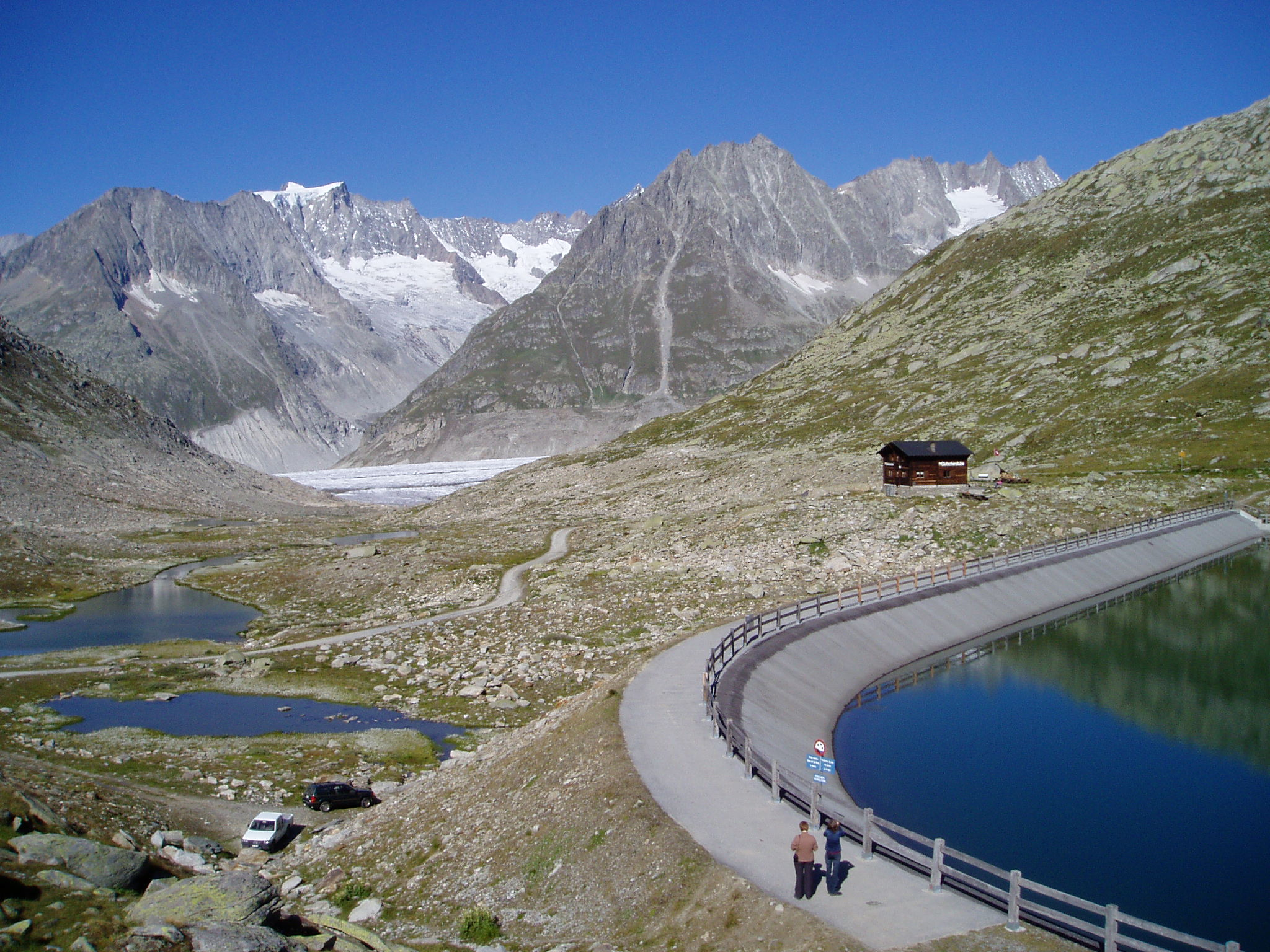
- The Vordersee (right) with its dam

- Location within Canton of Valais Location within Piedmont Location within Switzerland Location within Italy Location within Alps
- Interactive map of Vordersee
- Location: Valais
- Coordinates: 46°26′29″N 8°06′20″E
- Basin countries: Switzerland
- Surface area: 6.2 ha (15 acres)
- Surface elevation: 2,360 m (7,740 ft)

The Vordersee (also named Märjelen-Stausee) is a reservoir located east of the Aletsch Glacier, between the Strahlhorn and the Eggishorn, in the Swiss canton of Valais. The lake has a surface area of 0.062 km² and is located at 2,360 metres above sea level. It is located in the municipality of Fieschertal.

== See also ==
- List of mountain lakes of Switzerland
