= Strahlhorn (disambiguation) =

The Strahlhorn (4190 m) is a mountain of the Pennine Alps, east of Zermatt and south of Saas Fee in Valais. It is also the name of several other mountains in Switzerland:

- Strahlhorn (Baltschieder) (3200 m), part of the Bernese Alps, east of Bietschhorn and north of Baltschieder in Valais
- Strahlhorn (Fieschertal) (3026 m), part of the Bernese Alps between Aletsch Gacier and Fieschertal in Valais
- Strahlhorn (Niedergesteln) (3194 m), part of the Bernese Alps, south of Lötschental and west of Bietschhorn in Valais
- Strahlhorn (Guttannen) (3156 m), part of Bernese Alps, east of Guttannen, next to Gwächtenhorn, between Trift Glacier and Hasli Valley.
