= Strahlhorn (Fieschertal) =

Mountain in Switzerland

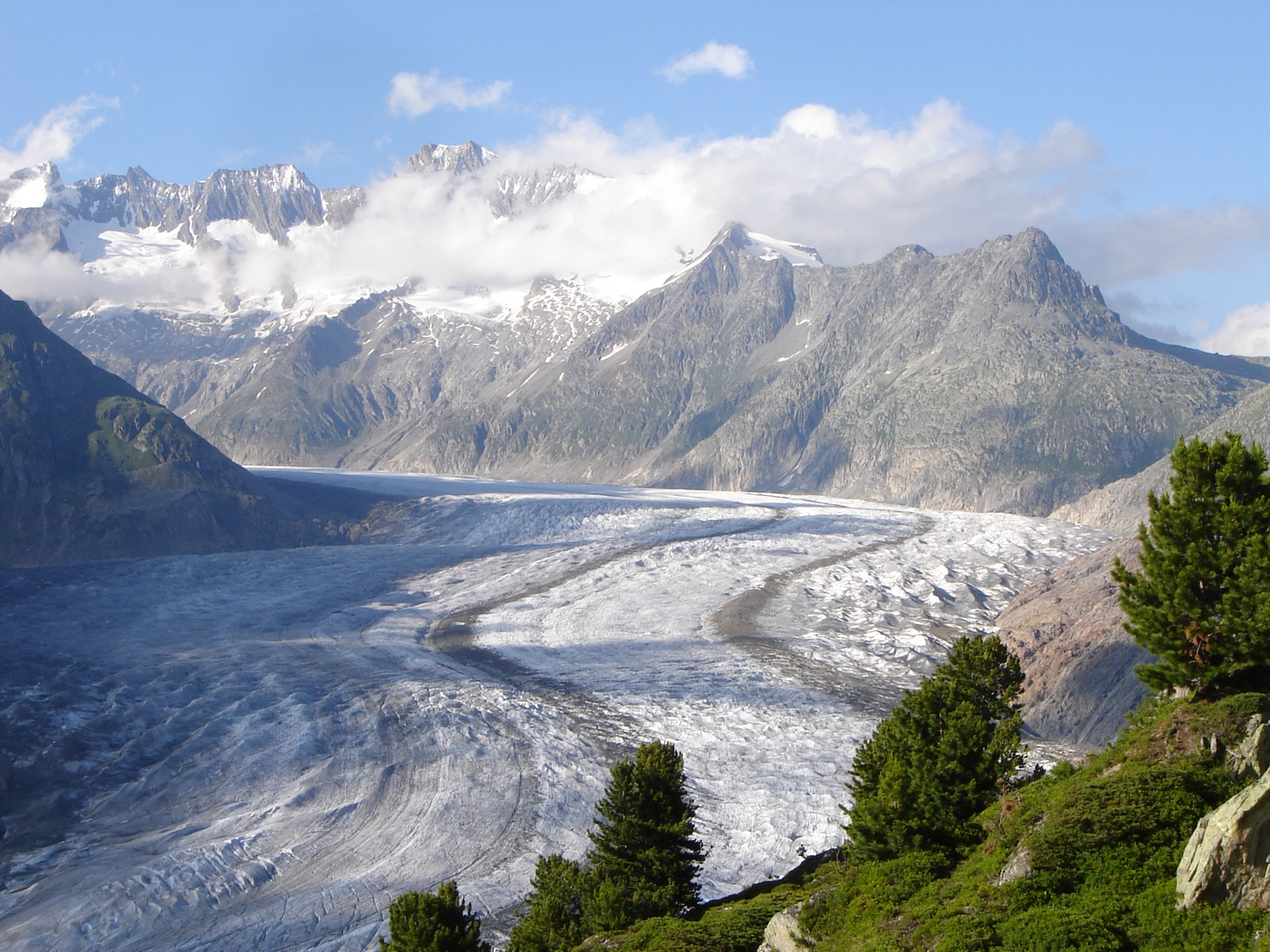
- The Aletsch Glacier with the Strahlhorn (right peak)

Highest point
- Elevation: 3,027 m (9,931 ft)
- Coordinates: 46°27′9.9″N 8°5′42.7″E

Geography
- Location within Switzerland
- Location: Valais, Switzerland
- Parent range: Bernese Alps

The Strahlhorn (3,027 m) is a mountain of the Bernese Alps, overlooking the Aletsch Glacier in the canton of Valais. It lies at the southern end of the Gross Wannenhorn range, just north of the Märjelensee.
