= Massa (river) =

River in Switzerland

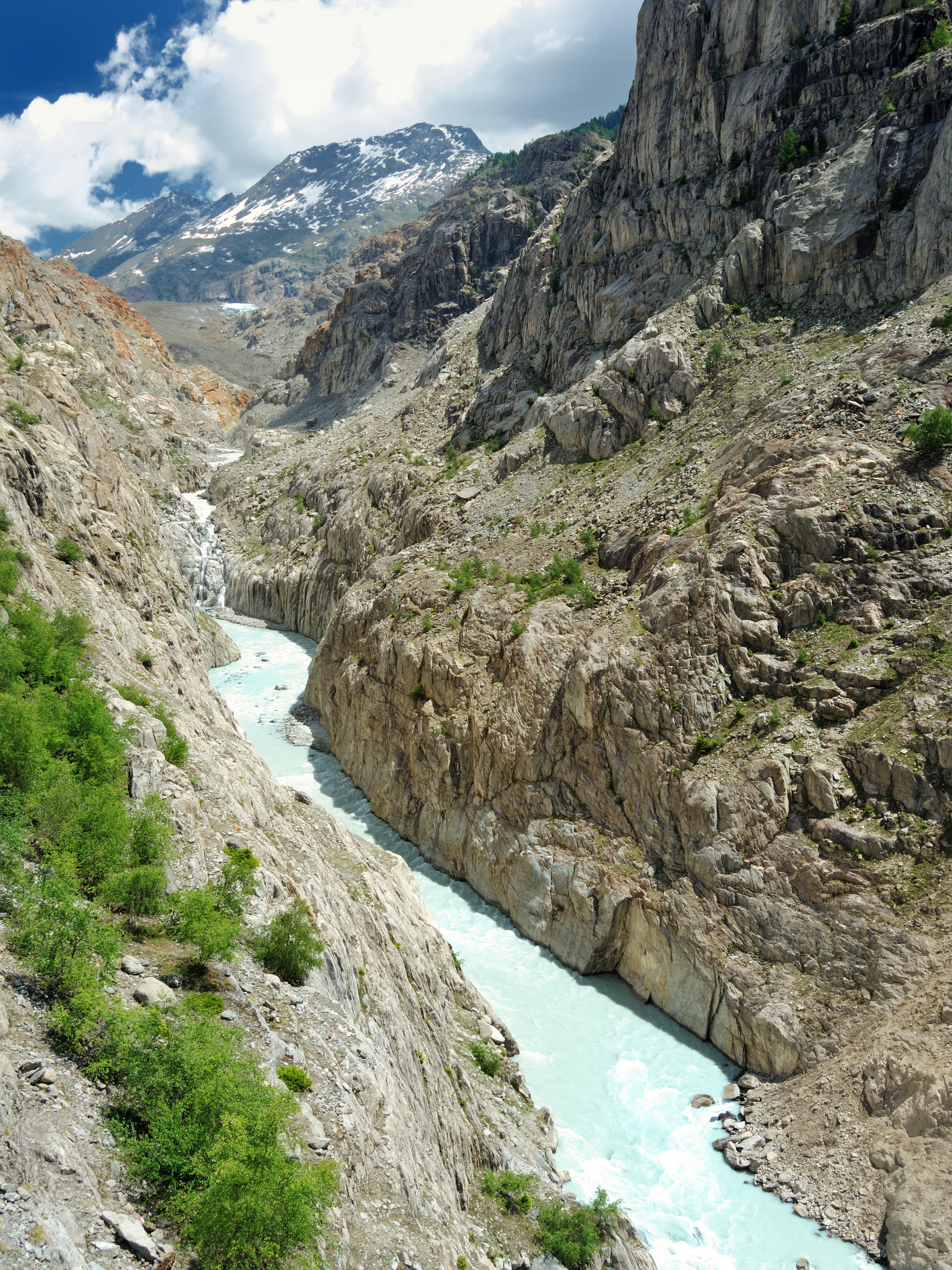
- The Massa flows through a steep-sided gorge. In the distance is the Aletsch Glacier, the source of the melt-water.

Location
- Country: Switzerland

Physical characteristics
- Source: Aletsch Glacier
  - location: Valais
  - coordinates: 46°26′32″N 8°04′38″E
- Mouth: Rhône
  - location: Bitsch, Valais
  - coordinates: 46.3298°N 8.0129°E
- Length: 7 km (4.3 mi)

Basin features
- Progression: Rhône→ Mediterranean Sea

The Massa (German pronunciation: [ˈmasa]) is a seven kilometre long river in the eastern Bernese Alps in the Swiss canton of Valais. It is mainly fed by the melt-water from the Aletsch Glacier. It passes through the Massa Gorge and flows into the Stausee Gibidum reservoir and onwards to its confluence with the Rhône.

The whole area, including other glaciers, is part of the Jungfrau-Aletsch Protected Area, which was declared a UNESCO World Heritage Site in 2001.

== See also ==
- List of rivers of Switzerland
- List of glaciers
- Retreat of glaciers since 1850
- Swiss Alps
