= Konkordiaplatz =

Flat area of snow and ice in the Swiss canton of Valais

Coordinates: 46°30′07″N 8°02′08″E

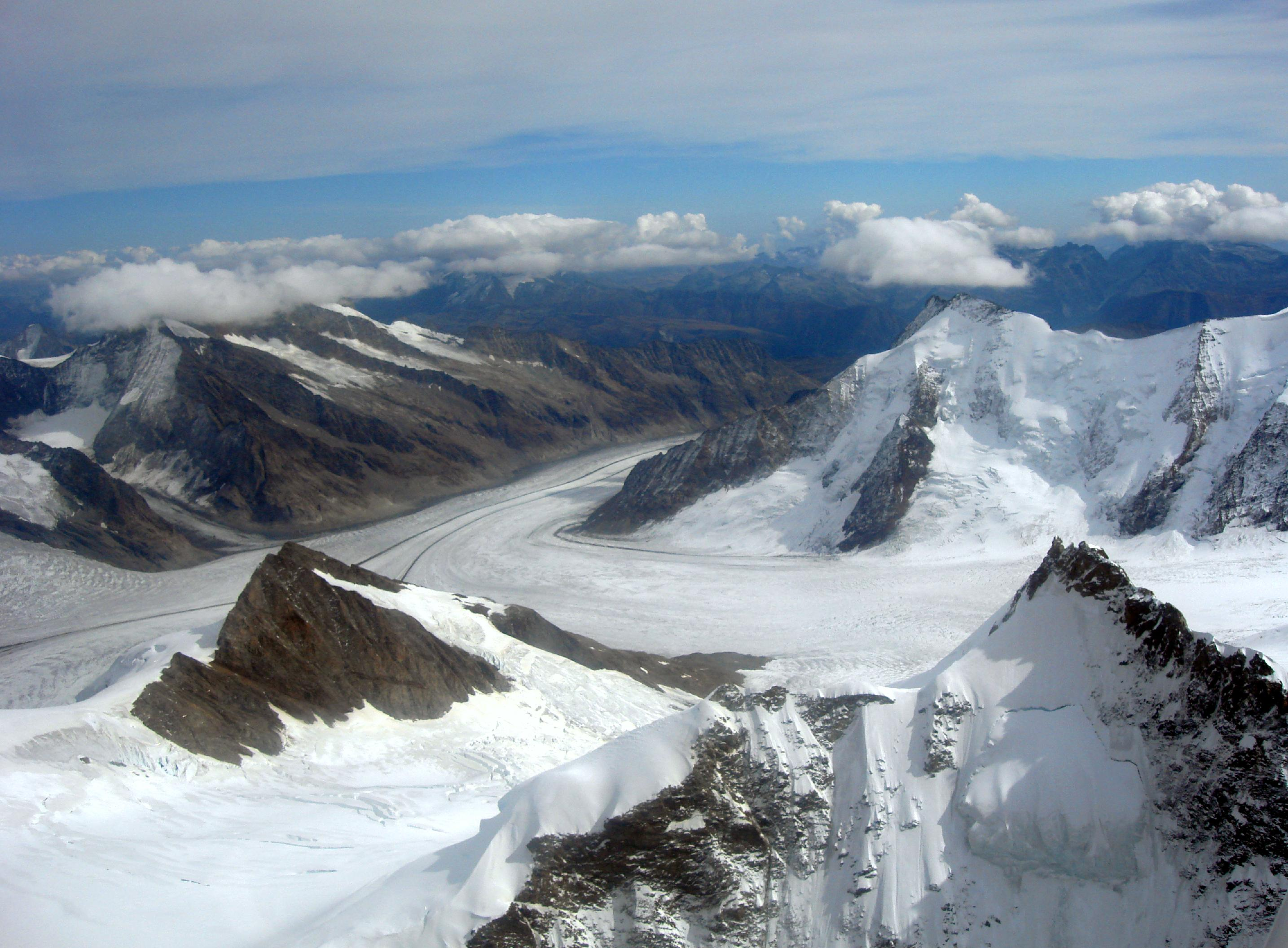
Aerial view of the Aletsch Glacier with the converging Jungfraufirn and Grosser Aletschfirn. Peaks of the Valais Alps on the horizon.

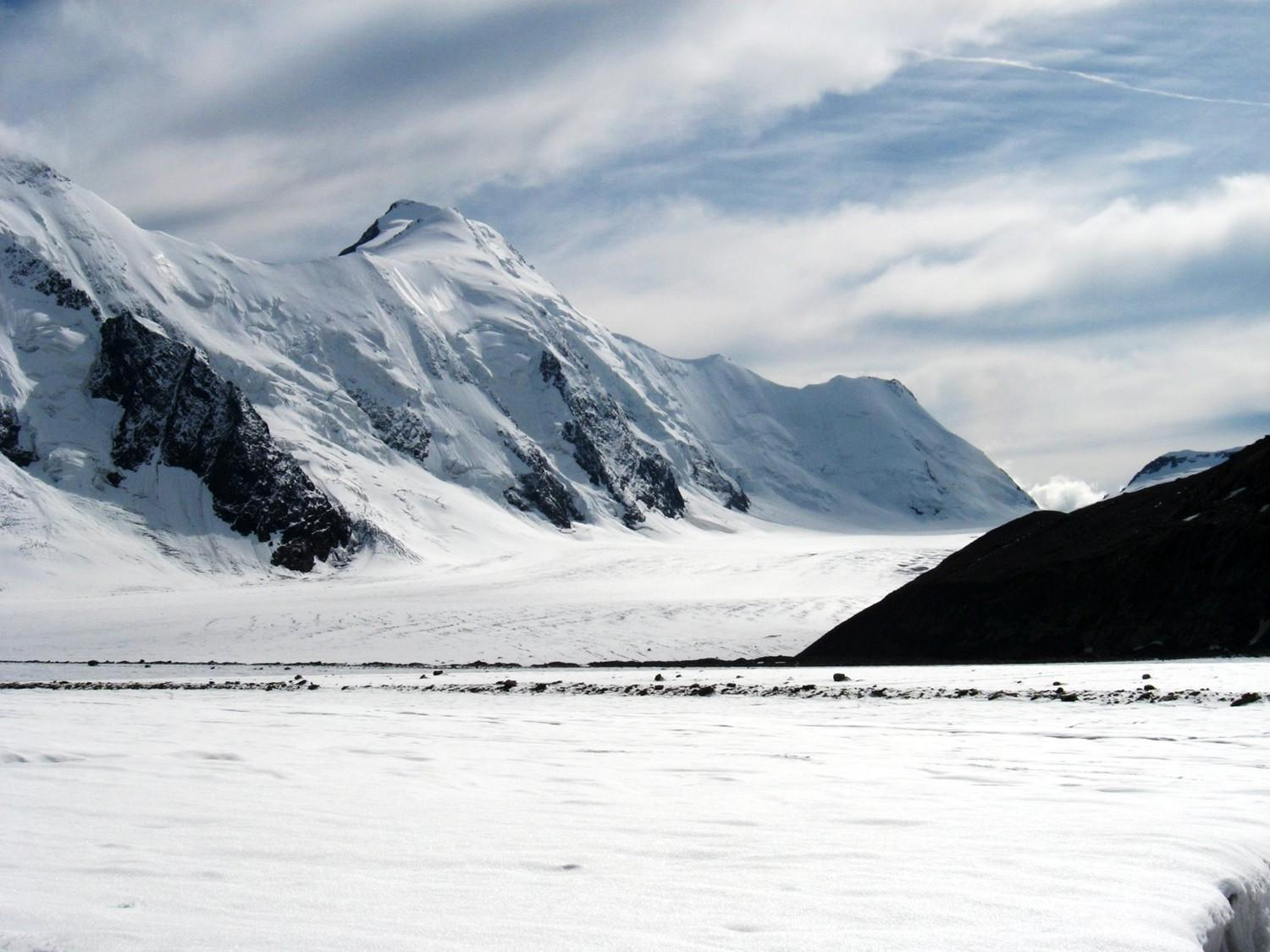
View from Konkordia towards Aletschhorn

The Konkordiaplatz or Concordia Place (French: Place de la Concorde), is a flat area of snow and ice lying just to the south of the Jungfrau in the Bernese Alps in the Swiss canton of Valais. It is the junction of four large glaciers coming down from the Aletschfirn, the Jungfraufirn, the Ewigschneefäld and the Grüneggfirn. The main Aletsch Glacier originates from Konkordiaplatz. The Konkordiaplatz Charter was signed by the municipalities located in the Jungfrau-Aletsch Protected Area UNESCO World Heritage site, vowing to retain the aesthetic beauty of the region.

== Naming ==
Concordia is the Latin word for harmony, literally "with (one) heart". It was the name of the Roman goddess of agreement, understanding, and marital harmony. British mountaineer John Frederick Hardy dubbed the location at the convergence of the several glaciers Place de la Concorde of Nature.

The name Concordia was then given to other places where two or more glaciers meet, or large glaciated areas, such as Concordia in the Karakoram, and Concordia Station in Antarctica.

== Geography ==
Konkordiaplatz is located at an altitude between 2,700 and 2,800 metres, covering an area of approximately 2 km^{2}. The depth of snow and ice is more than 900 metres. It is surrounded by the Dreieckhorn (south), the Fiescher Gabelhorn (east), the Grünhorn (north-east) and the Kranzberg (subpeak of the Jungfrau) and Trugberg (north).

The area is uninhabited but the Konkordia Hut lies above the glacier, on the western slope of Gross Wannenhorn.
