= Stausee Gibidum =

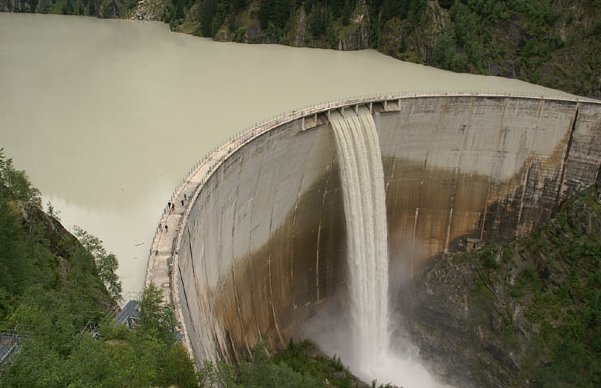

- Location within Canton of Valais Location within Switzerland Location within Alps
- Interactive map of Stausee Gibidum
- Location: Valais, Switzerland
- Coordinates: 46°22′22″N 8°0′10″E
- Type: reservoir
- Primary inflows: Aletsch Glacier, Massa
- Primary outflows: Massa
- Catchment area: 150.3 km^{2} (58.0 sq mi)
- Basin countries: Switzerland
- Surface area: 0.21 km^{2} (0.081 sq mi)
- Max. depth: 104 m (341 ft)
- Water volume: 9.2×10^{6} m^{3} (320×10^{6} cu ft)
- Surface elevation: 1,436.5 m (4,713 ft)

Stausee Gibidum (Gibidum reservoir or "Stausee Gebidem") is a reservoir in the canton of Valais, Switzerland. Its surface area is 0.21 km², shared by the municipalities of Naters and Riederalp.

The construction of Gebidem dam was started in 1964 and completed by 1967. The arch dam has an elevation of 122 m and a crest length of 327 m.

== See also ==
- List of mountain lakes of Switzerland
