= Grünhornlücke =

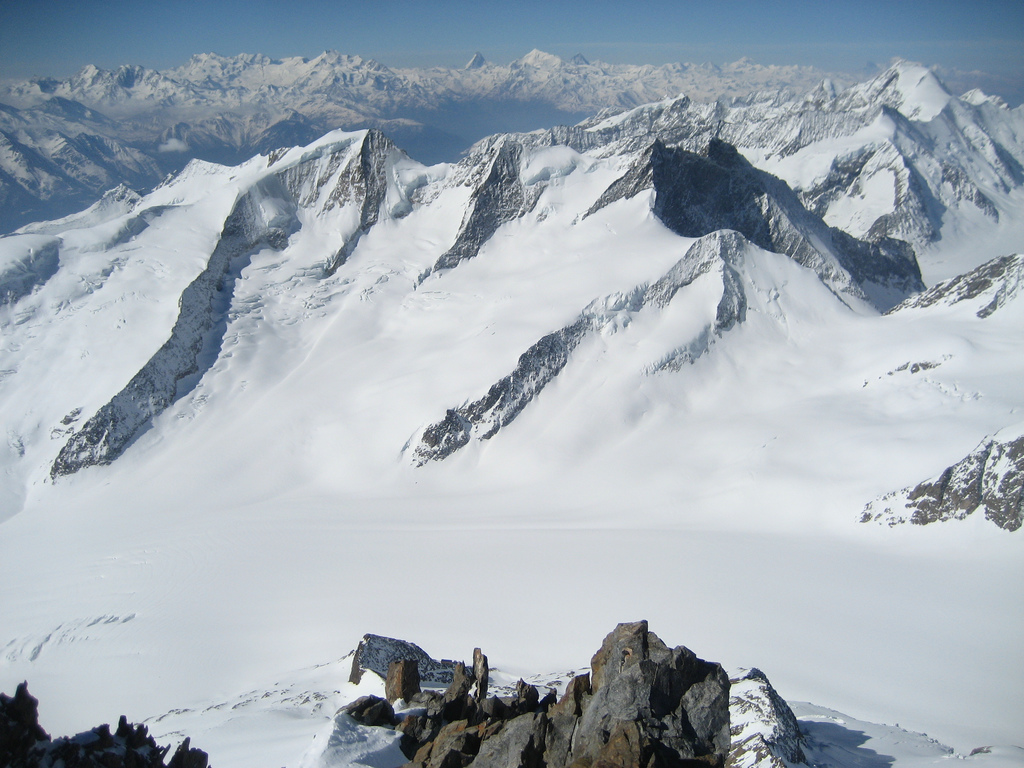
- The Grünhornlücke (far right) from the Finsteraarhorn (east side)

- Location within Switzerland
- Elevation: 3,270 metres (10,730 ft)
- Traversed by: Glacier

Third Approach
- Location: Valais, Switzerland
- Range: Bernese Alps
- Coordinates: 46°30′49.5″N 8°05′00.7″E

The Grünhornlücke (el. 3270 m.) is a high mountain pass in the eastern Bernese Alps, connecting the Aletsch Glacier and the Fiescher Glacier in the canton of Valais. The pass is located between the Grünhorn on the north and the Fiescher Gabelhorn on the south.

On the west side of the pass (Aletsch Glacier) is the Konkordiaplatz. The Grünhornlücke is approximately halfway between the Konkordia Hut and the Finsteraarhorn Hut.

== See also ==
- List of mountain passes in Switzerland
