= Bettmerhorn =

Mountain in the Bernese Alps, Switzerland

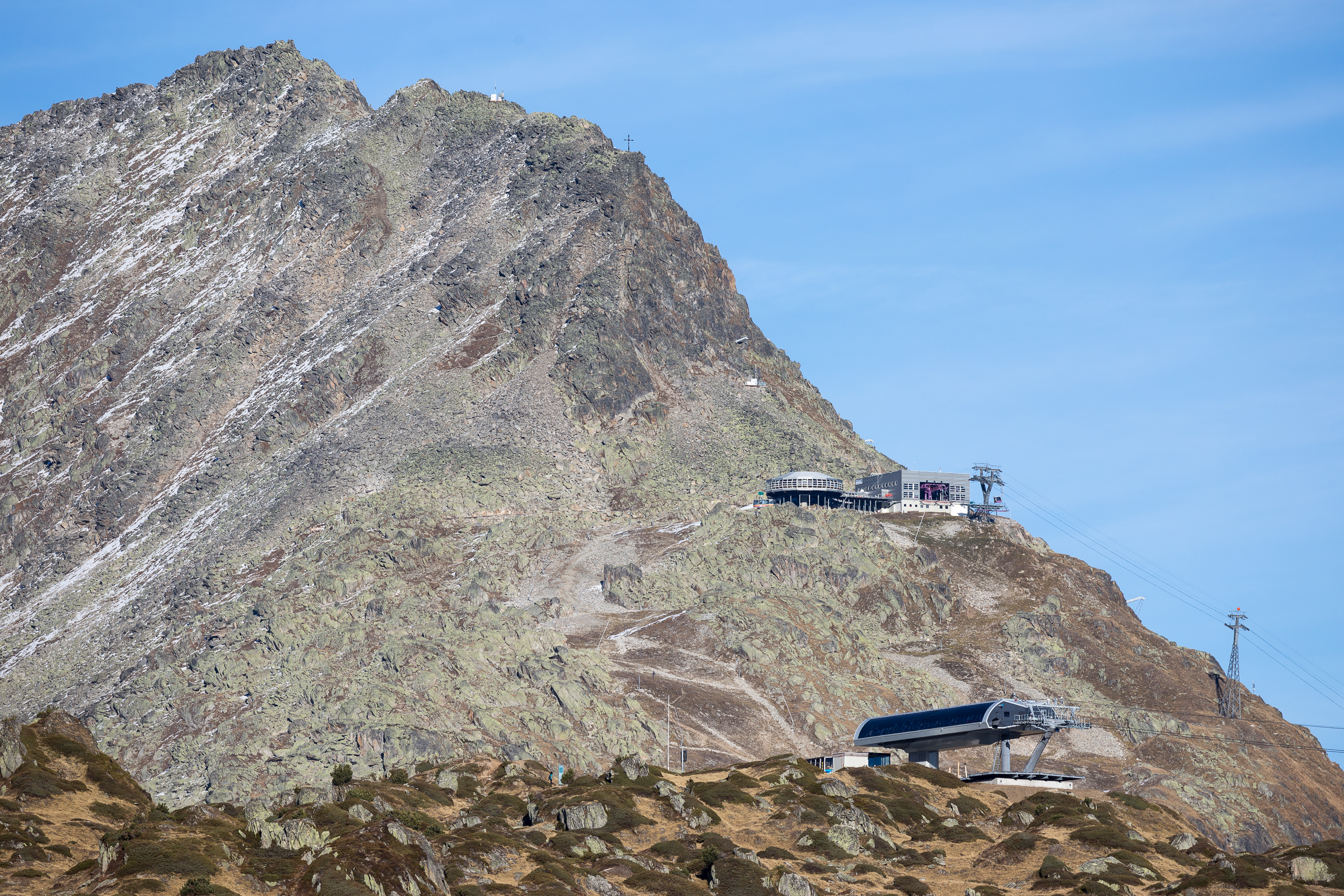
- Bettmerhorn with the gondola lift’s mountain station

Highest point
- Elevation: 2,872 m (9,423 ft)
- Prominence: 150 m (490 ft)
- Parent peak: Eggishorn
- Coordinates: 46°24′36″N 8°4′36″E

Geography
- Location within Switzerland
- Location: Valais, Switzerland
- Parent range: Bernese Alps

The Bettmerhorn is a mountain of the Bernese Alps, located north of Bettmeralp in the Swiss canton of Valais. The summit can be reached with a 30-minute vertical hike after ascending most of the mountain by cable car from the car free village of Bettmeralp. Bettmeralp is accessible by cable car from the Betten train station (Matterhorn Gotthard Bahn).

The Bettmerhorn summit station offers impressive views on the Bernese Alps and the Aletsch Glacier, the largest in the Alps. The view also extends to the Lepontine and Pennine Alps (Dom, Matterhorn, Weisshorn).
