= Märjelensee =

Lake in Valais, Switzerland

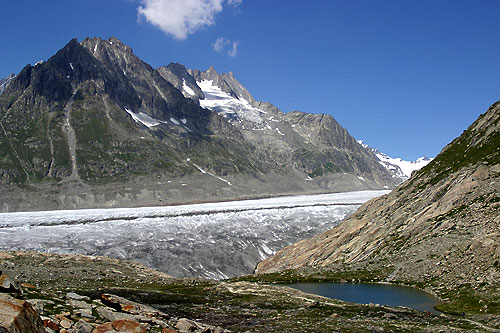

- Location within Canton of Valais Location within Switzerland Location within Alps
- Interactive map of Märjelensee
- Location: Aletsch Glacier, Valais
- Coordinates: 46°26′26.76″N 8°5′31.17″E
- Type: periglacial
- Basin countries: Switzerland
- Surface area: 32 ha (79 acres)
- Max. depth: 45 m (148 ft)
- Surface elevation: 2,348 m (7,703 ft)

Märjelensee is a lake in the canton of Valais, Switzerland. It formed on the eastern side of the Aletsch Glacier in the 19th century.
