= Eggishorn =

Mountain in Switzerland

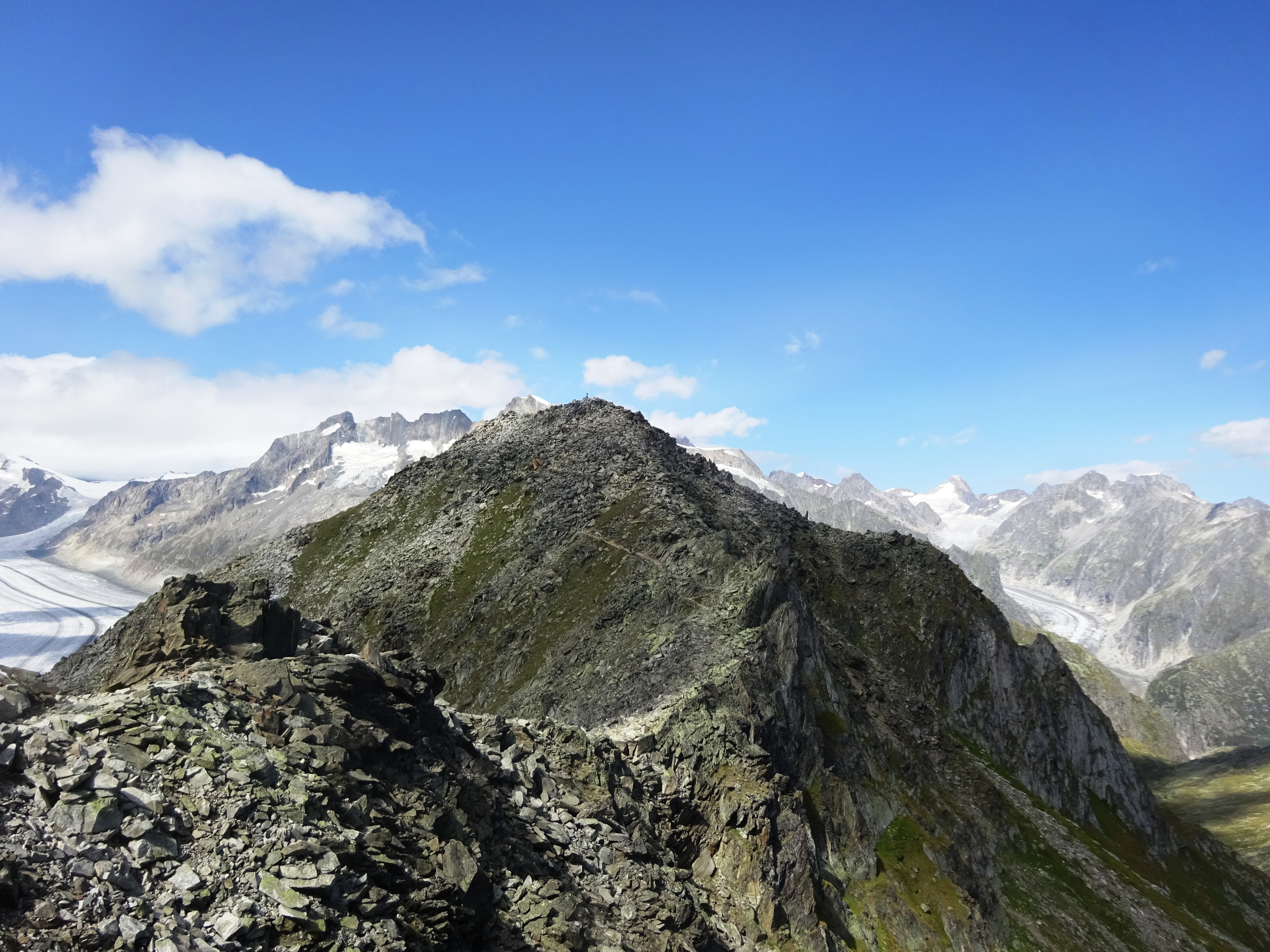
- Eggishorn viewed from southwest

Highest point
- Elevation: 2,927 m (9,603 ft)
- Prominence: 563 m (1,847 ft)
- Parent peak: Finsteraarhorn
- Listing: Alpine mountains 2500-2999 m
- Coordinates: 46°25′53″N 8°05′39″E

Geography
- Location within Switzerland
- Location: Valais, Switzerland
- Parent range: Bernese Alps

Climbing
- Easiest route: Aerial tramway

The Eggishorn is a mountain in the southeastern part of the Bernese Alps, located north of Fiesch in the Swiss canton of Valais. A cable car station is located on a secondary summit named Fiescherhorli (2,893 m), 500 metres south of the main peak.

The Eggishorn lies within the Jungfrau-Aletsch-Bietschhorn region, which in 2001 was designated by UNESCO as a World Heritage Site. On its northern flank is the Aletsch Glacier. From the summit the view extends also to the Lepontine and Pennine Alps (Dom, Matterhorn, Weisshorn).

Together with Fiescherhorli and Bettmerhorn, Eggishorn forms a ridge, running in a direction from north-northeast to south-southwest, with steep slopes on both sides, facing Aletsch Glacier in the west and the mountain plateau of Fiescheralpe above the Rhone valley in the east. In terms of its geology, this mountain ridge is part of the metamorphic coat of the granitic Aarmassif; predominant rock types are gneiss and schist.

== Pictures ==
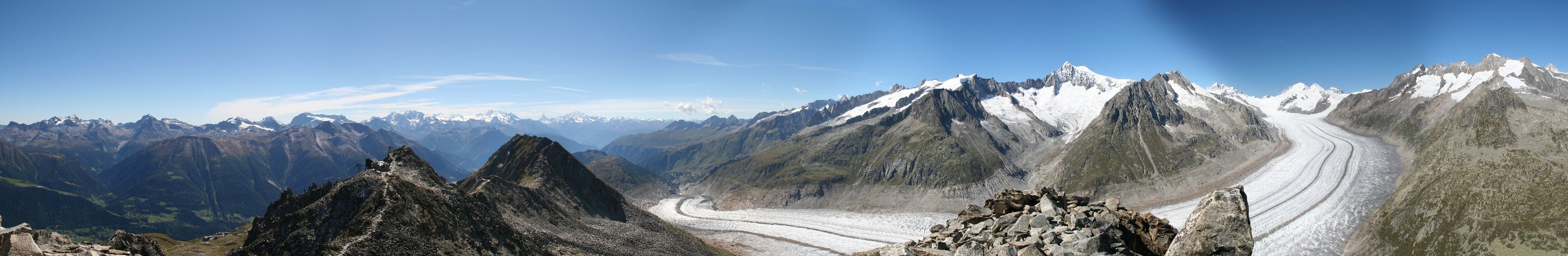
Panorama Picture from the Eggishorn to the North and the West and the Aletsch Glacier
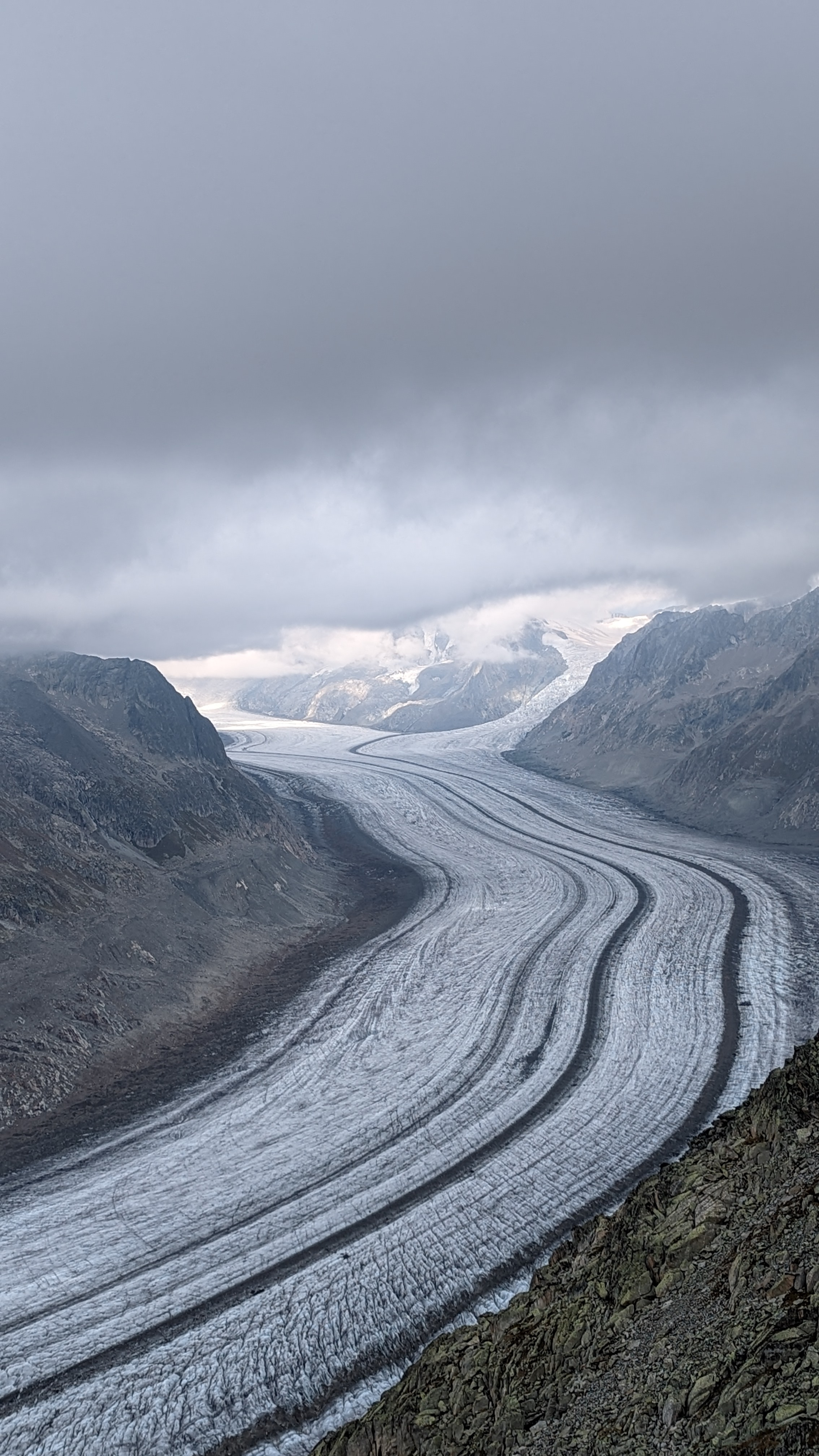

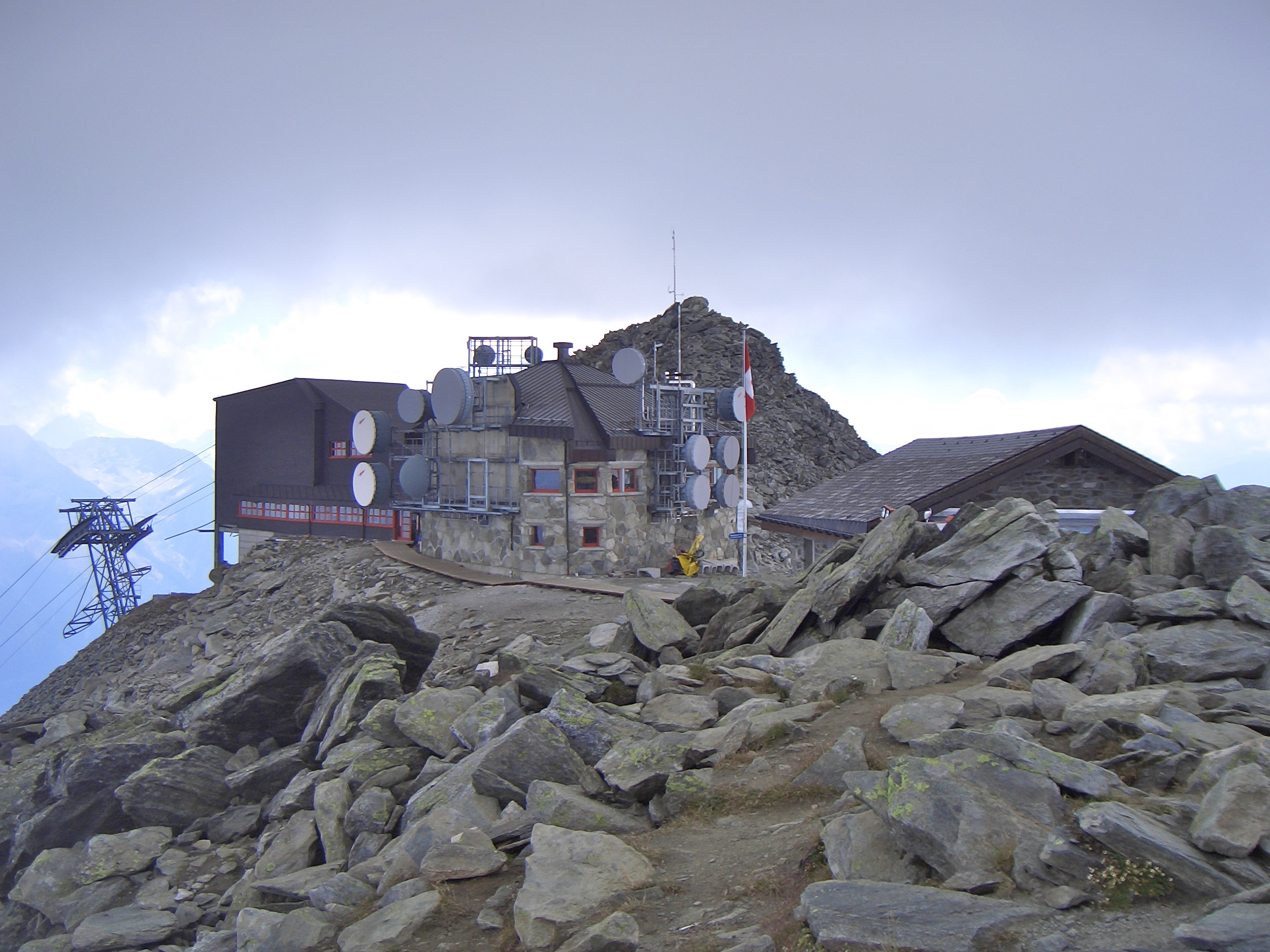
Eggishorn Terminus 2,926 metres (9,600 ft)

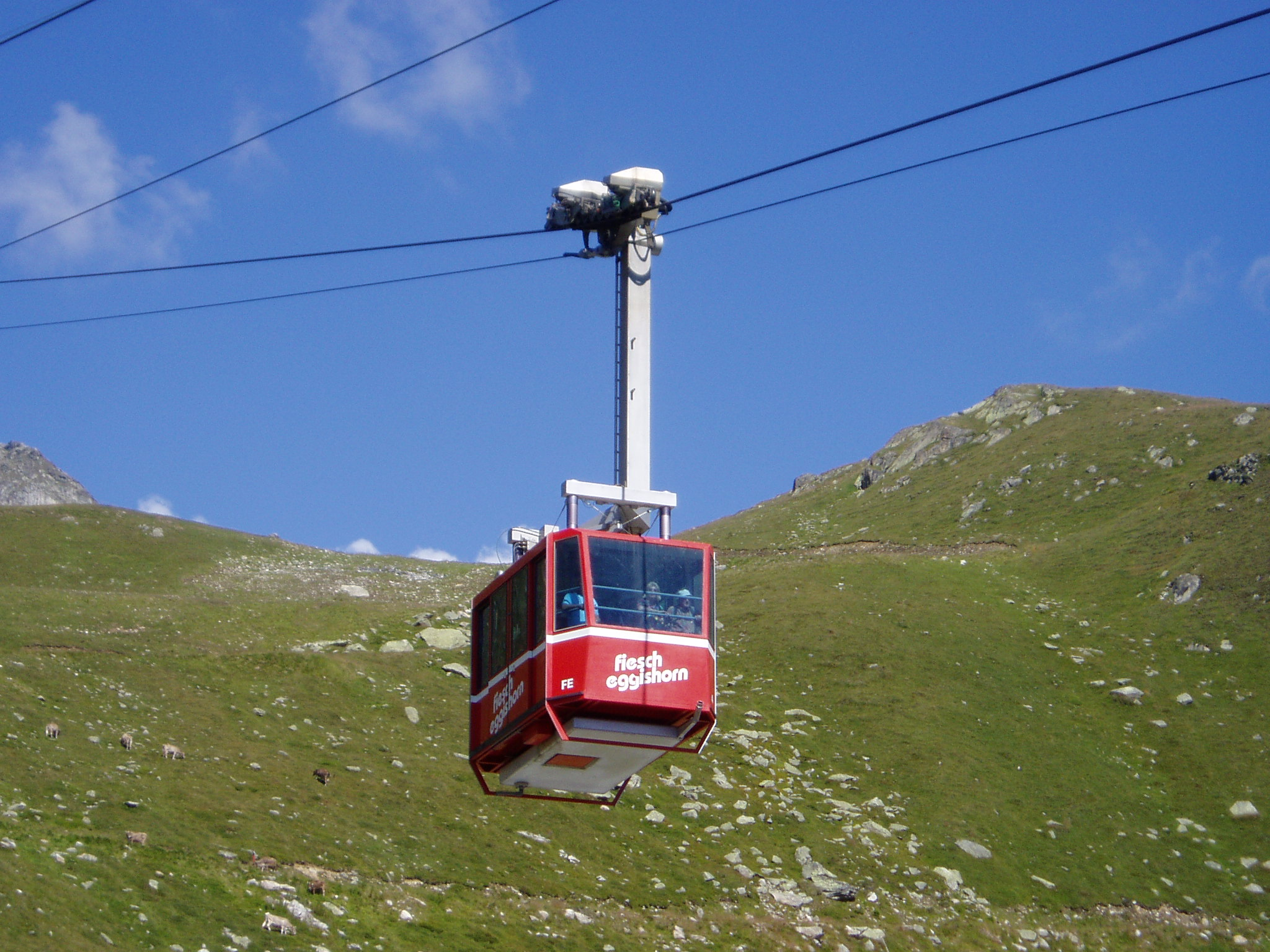
Aerial tramway Fiesch Eggishorn (FE)

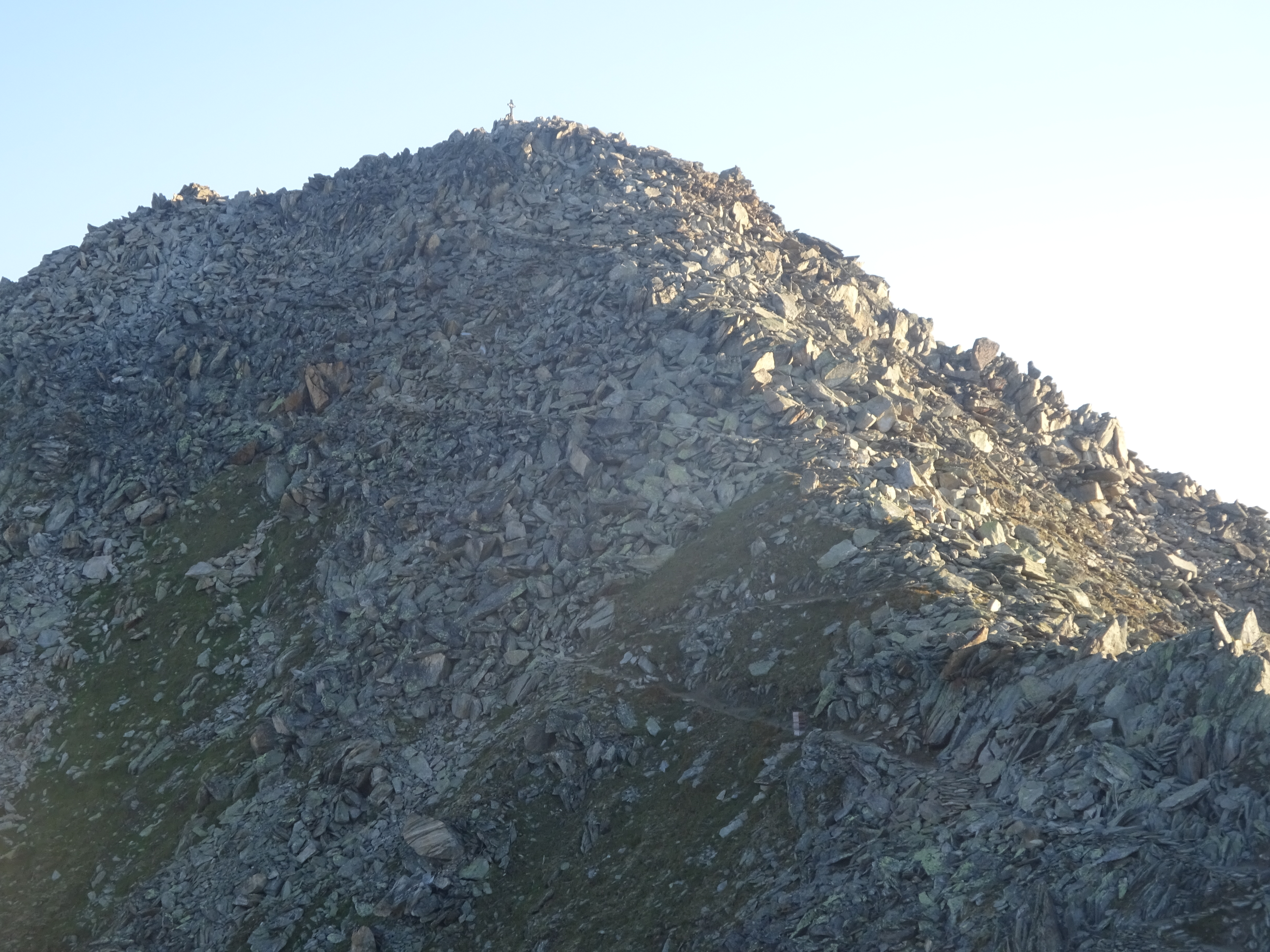
Gipfel des Eggishorns mit Schuttfeld unterhalb

== See also ==
- List of mountains of Switzerland accessible by public transport
