= Chamm =

- Directed by: Rajeev Kumar
- Written by: Bhagwant Rasulpuri
- Produced by: Tejinder Pal Surender
- Starring: Mehereen; Hardeep Gill; Surender; Baljinder
- Release date: 2017
- Running time: 35 minutes
- Country: India
- Language: Punjabi

Chamm is a 2017, Punjabi film directed Rajeev Kumar and produced by Tejinder Pal Surender. The film focuses on the Dalit community of Punjab and is based on a short story written by Bhagwant Rasulpuri. The 35-minute movie got selected to be screened at the Cannes Film Festival's 2017 Short Film Corner. The film will also be screened at the International Film Festival of South Asia at Toronto.

The film revolves around the story of a Dalit man who works at a slaughter house.

== Plot ==
The film is a story of two brothers from a lower caste, who go through every evil of society from bankruptcy to unemployment through the clutches of politicians, local dealers and medical services. Sarpanch Haakam is the antagonist who wishes to destroy Keepa and his nuclear family but, one Veterinary doctor comes in between to save them and their family.

== Cast ==
- Mehereen
- Hardeep Gill
- Surender
- Baljinder

== Production and distribution ==
The film has been independently produced and it is now being screened for free at towns and villages in and around Punjab.
