= Jungfrau-Aletsch protected area =

Protected area in south-western Switzerland

Swiss Alps Jungfrau-Aletsch
UNESCO World Heritage Site
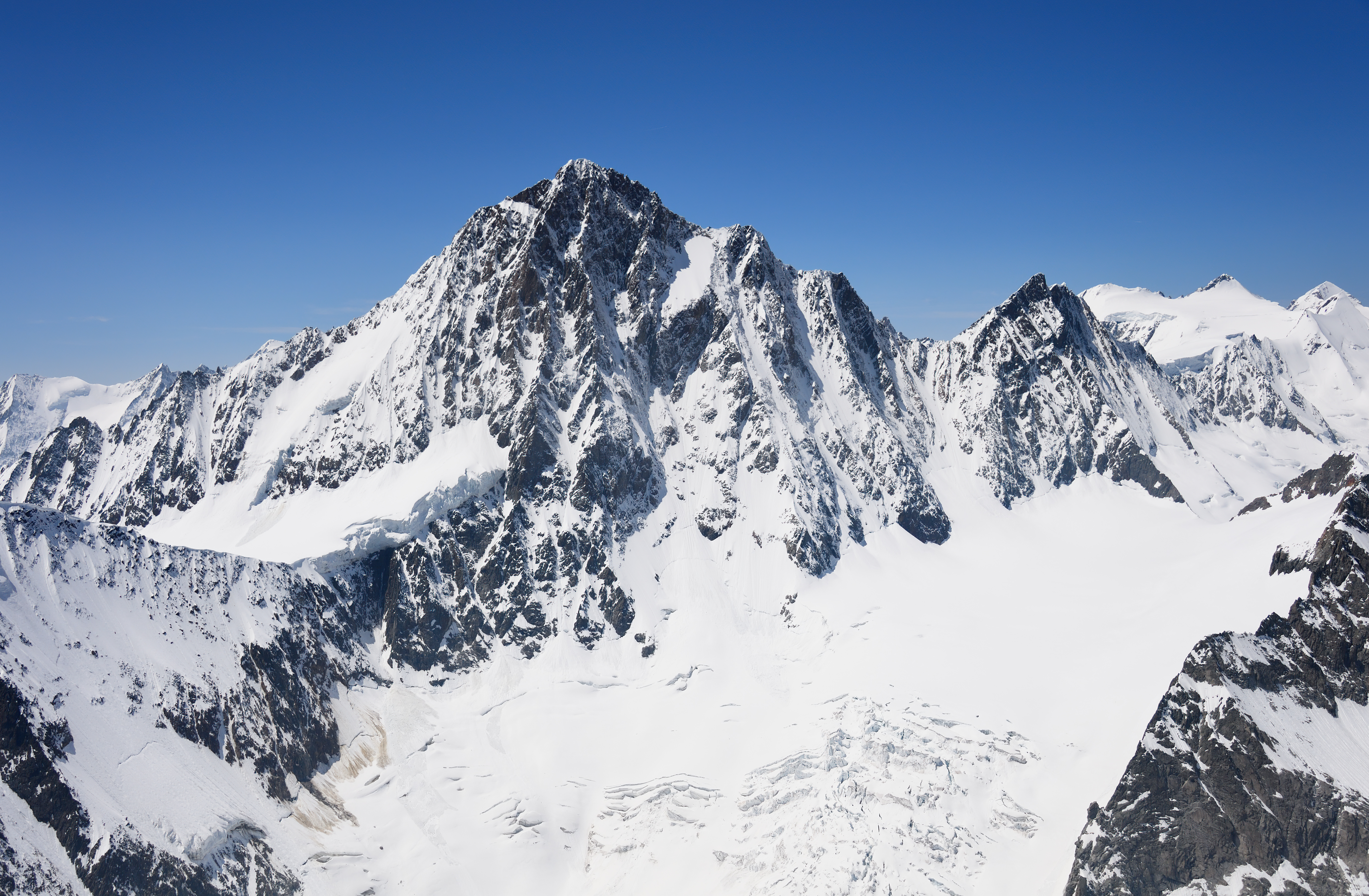
- View of the Finsteraarhorn

- Location within Switzerland
- Location: Switzerland
- Criteria: Natural: (vii), (viii), (ix)
- Reference: 1037bis
- Inscription: 2001 (25th Session)
- Extensions: 2007
- Area: 82,400 ha (204,000 acres)
- Website: jungfraualetsch.ch
- Coordinates: 46°30′N 8°02′E

The Jungfrau-Aletsch protected area (officially Swiss Alps Jungfrau-Aletsch) is located in south-western Switzerland between the cantons of Bern and Valais. It is a mountainous region in the easternmost side of the Bernese Alps, containing the northern wall of Jungfrau and Eiger, and the largest glaciated area in western Eurasia, comprising the Aletsch Glacier. The Jungfrau-Aletsch protected area is the first World Natural Heritage site in the Alps; it was inscribed in 2001.

== Geography and climate ==
The Jungfrau-Aletsch protected area is located in the Swiss Alps between the Bernese Oberland and north-eastern Valais, about 25 km south of Interlaken and 20 km north of Brig. The site covers the whole Aar massif from the Oeschinensee in the west to the Grimselsee (not comprised) in the east, including the basins of the Aletsch, Fiescher, Aar and Grindelwald glaciers.

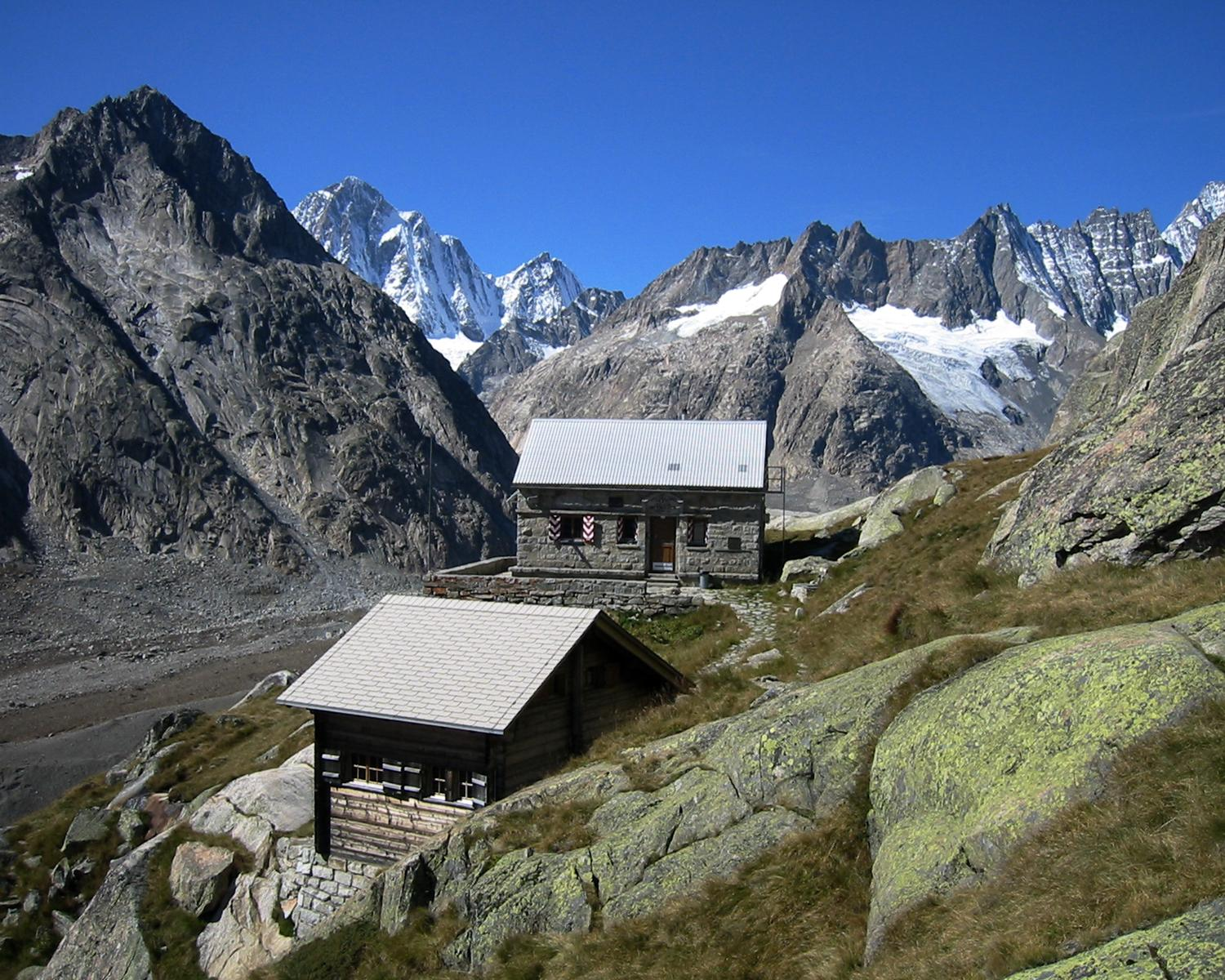
The valley of the Unteraar Glacier

The culminating point is the Finsteraarhorn which, with its 4,270 metres, is also the highest mountain in the Bernese Alps. 8 other summits above 4,000 metres are located in the area: Aletschhorn, Jungfrau, Mönch, Schreckhorn, Gross Fiescherhorn, Hinter Fiescherhorn, Grünhorn and Lauteraarhorn.

The summit ridge separating the cantons of Valais and Bern is the main watershed of Europe. The principal valleys on the north side run due north below the precipitous 20 kilometer north wall of the Jungfrau, Mönch and Eiger, thence to the Aar, a tributary of the Rhine which runs into the North Sea. The southern valleys drain into the southwest running valley of the Rhone which flows into the Mediterranean sea.

The climate of the region is strongly influenced by the height of the mountains. They form a barrier between the wet sub-oceanic climate of the north and the drier climate of the south-facing Valais slopes. On the north side the rainfall exceeds 2,200 mm, most falling in summer, but on the south side it is only 1,000 mm, with more falling in winter. The Valais experiences a subcontinental climate at low and medium altitudes and is markedly semi-arid. Mean annual temperatures range from -8.5 °C at Jungfraujoch (3,500 m) to 9.1 °C at Brig (700 m).

== Physical features ==
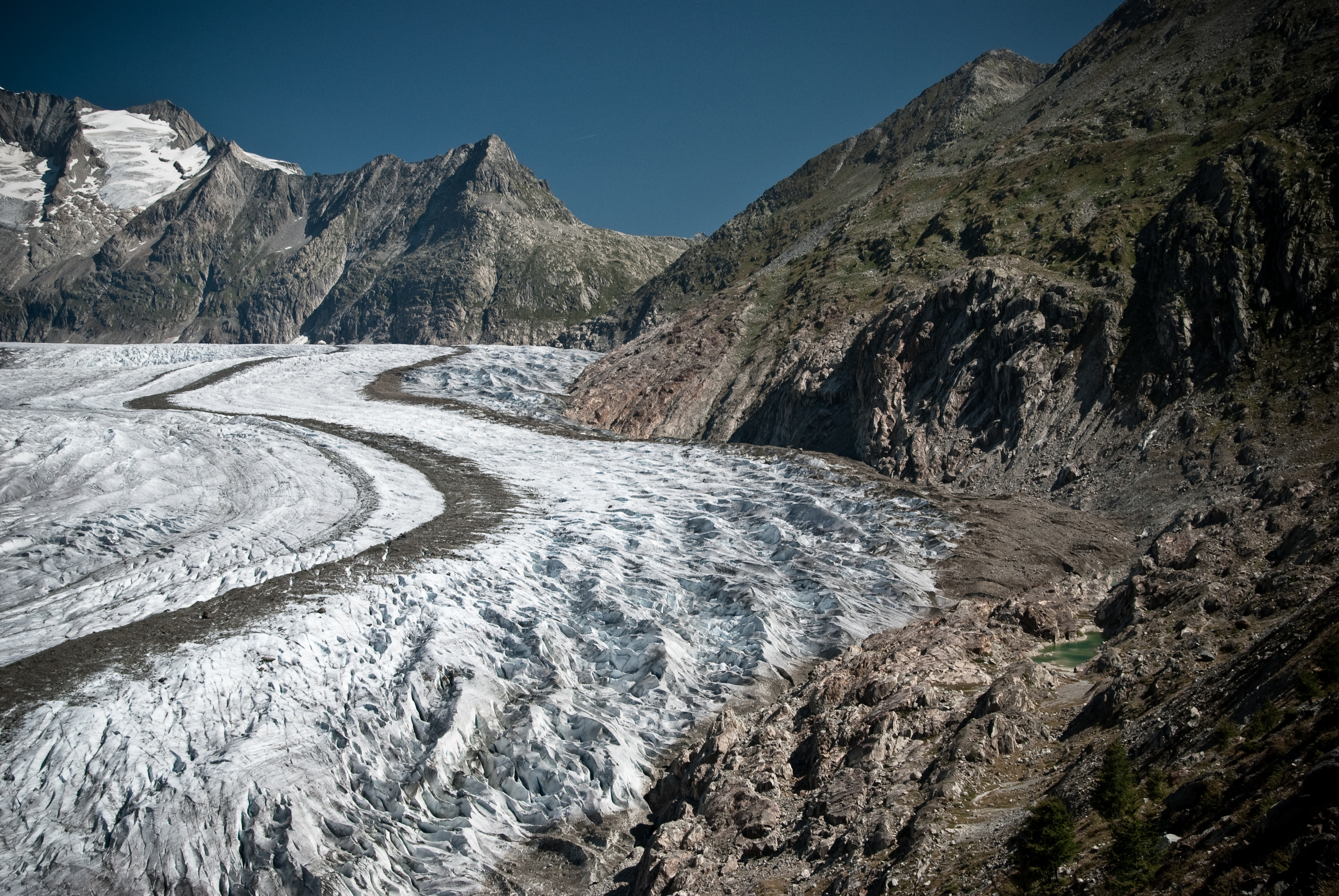
Aletsch Glacier

The Jungfrau-Aletsch site is almost untouched, except for trails and mountain huts. It is deeply glaciated. About half of the area is higher than 2,600 metres, a few hundred metres lower than the limit between the glaciers accumulation and ablation zones. The total area covered by glacier is 35,000 ha, it constitutes the largest continuous area of ice in the Alps. The largest and longest glacier in the Alps, the Aletsch Glacier is 23 km long and has a maximum thickness of 900 metres at Konkordiaplatz.

=== Area ===
The protected site covers an area of 82,388 ha, comprising the 53,888 ha existing World Heritage Site plus extensions at both ends totaling 28,500 ha. 56% is within the Canton of Valais, 44% within the Canton of Bern.

== Flora and fauna ==
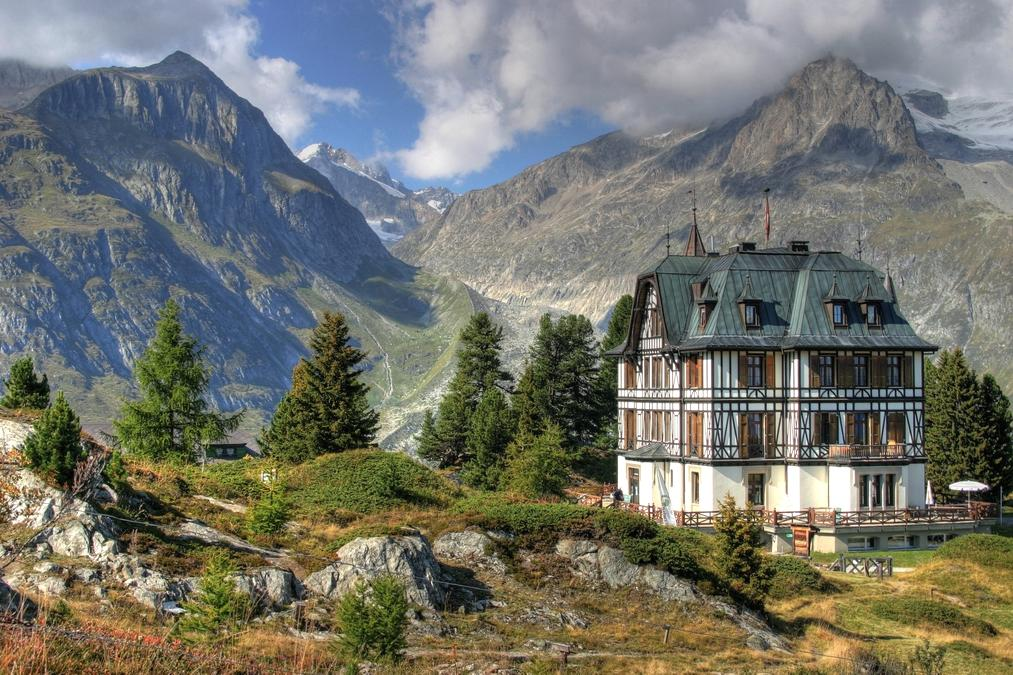
Tree line of the Aletsch Forest (Pro Natura nature centre).

Glaciers and barren rock constitute 80% of the area; 6% is forested, 5.2% is alpine meadow, and 8% is scrub. Altitude is the strongest factor influencing the distribution and diversity of the vegetation. Within the nominated area there are 1,800 species of vascular plants and 700 mosses. The growing period decreases with altitude, but there are 529 species of phanerogams and pteridophytes above the tree line. Broadleaf montane forest extends from 900 m to 1,300 m on north- facing slopes. On south-facing slopes the same zone is approximately 200 m higher. The subalpine zone lies between 1,300 m to 2,000 m, between the broadleaf and alpine zone. Characteristic species are the Swiss Pine (Pinus Cembra) and the Norway Spruce (Picea abies) on the north and south side respectively. An example of Pinus cembra forest is the Aletsch Forest above the Aletsch Glacier and near the tree line. It developed on the moraine of the glacier after its maximum extension in 1850. The zone directly above the tree line forms a girdle of moorland vegetation and Alpine grassland.

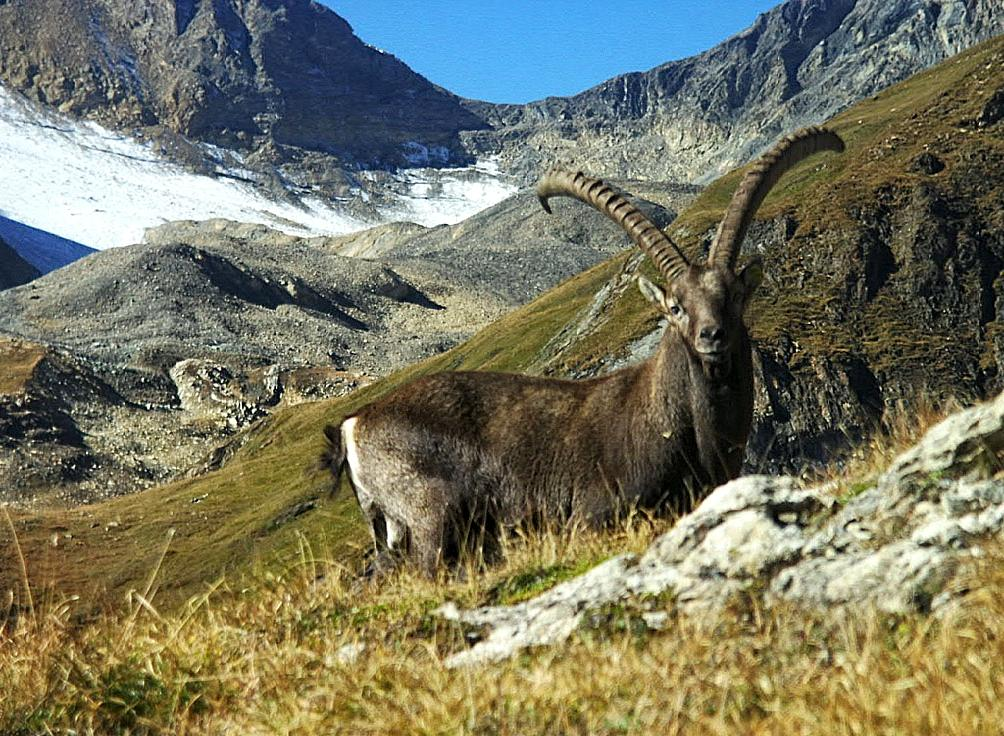
Alpine ibex (Lötschental valley)

1,250 fauna species have been recorded on the site, including 271 vertebrates: 42 mammals, 99 birds, eight reptiles, four amphibians and seven fish, and numerous invertebrates including 97 molluscs and 979 insects. As for the rest of the Alps, common species are the chamois (Rupicapra rupicapra), alpine ibex (Capra ibex), red deer (Cervus elaphus). Smaller mammals include the mountain hare (Lepus timidus), fox (Vulpes vulpes), ermine (Mustela erminea), marmot (Marmota marmota) and the reintroduced lynx (Felis lynx).

== Tourism ==
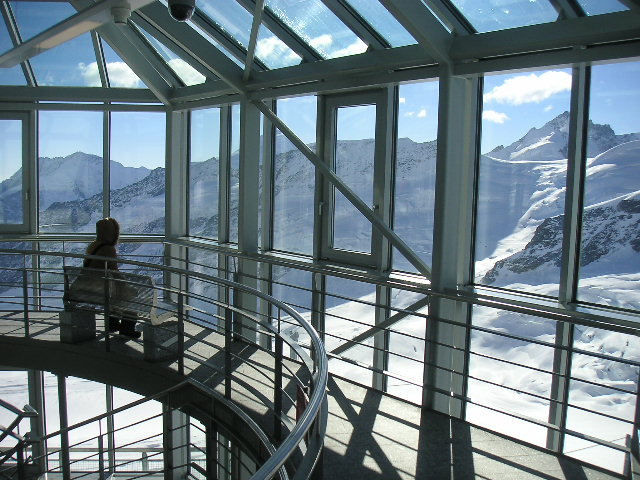
Jungfraujoch

The regions of the Bernese Oberland and Valais have been popular tourist destinations since the 19th century. The Jungfrau was first climbed in 1811 and the Finsteraarhorn in 1812. The first tourists came mostly in summer, but in the 1930s winter sports became also popular. On the north side visitors are only able to visit the site via the Jungfrau railway which leads to the Jungfraujoch. The railway has turned the site from an inaccessible mountain face to a very accessible site visited by large nearby populations. The Jungfrau railway was built between 1870 and 1912, taking visitors from Kleine Scheidegg (2,061 m) to Jungfraujoch (3,454 m), the saddle between the Mönch and Jungfrau. On the south side the area of Riederalp-Bettmeralp hosts most of the visitors. Other inhabited regions on the margin are Kandersteg and the Lötschental. The network of foot-paths is well developed around the site but nonexistent through it, the centre being inaccessible to walkers. The site can only be accessed by experienced mountaineers and there is a series of 37 shelters and five mountain refuges with a total of 1,582 beds, managed by the Swiss Alpine Club. The Aletsch ecological centre in Riederalp is run by Pro Natura functions as a visitor center.

== History ==
- 1933: The protection of the Aletsch forest is assumed by the canton of Valais
- 1960: The canton of Bern assumes the protection of the upper Lauterbrunnen Valley
- 1983: The Bernese Alps are included on the Federal Inventory of Landscapes and Natural Monuments, with a revision of the area in 1998
- 2001: The area is inscribed in the UNESCO World Heritage list under the name Jungfrau-Aletsch-Bietschhorn
- 2007: Extension of the site, new name Swiss Alps Jungfrau-Aletsch

== Notes and references ==
- Swiss Alps Jungfrau-Aletsch, United Nation Environment Programme
- Swisstopo maps
