= Aletsch Glacier =

Largest glacier in the Alps

- (Grosser) Aletschgletscher
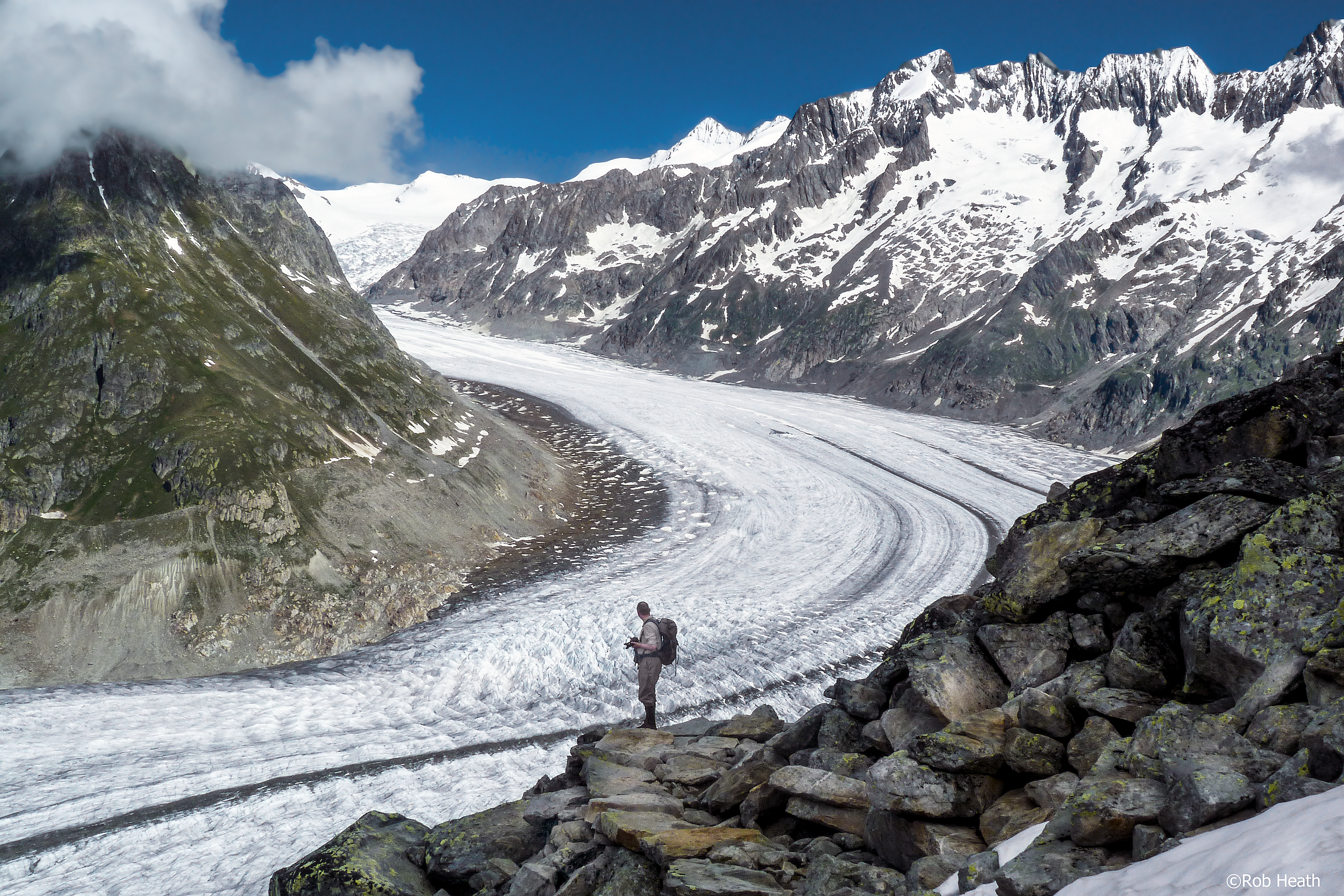
- Aletsch Glacier in June 2011

- Location within Switzerland Location within Canton of Valais Location within Alps
- Interactive map of Aletsch Glacier
- Type: Valley glacier
- Location: Valais, Switzerland
- Coordinates: 46°26′32″N 8°4′38″E
- Area: 81.7 km^{2} (31.5 square miles) (2011)
- Length: 22.6 km (14.0 miles) (2014)
- Thickness: 940 m (3,080 ft)
- Highest elevation: 4160 m
- Lowest elevation: 1650 m
- Terminus: Massa
- Status: Retreating

The Aletsch Glacier (German: Aletschgletscher [ˈaːlɛtʃˌɡlɛtʃər]) or Great Aletsch Glacier (Grosser Aletschgletscher) is the largest glacier in the Alps. It has a length of about 23 km (14 mi) (2014), a volume of 15.4 km^{3} (3.7 cu mi) (2011), and covers about 81.7 km^{2} (31.5 square miles) (2011) in the eastern Bernese Alps in the Swiss canton of Valais. The Aletsch Glacier is composed of four smaller glaciers converging at Konkordiaplatz, where its thickness was measured to reach a maximum of 905 metres (2,969 ft). It then continues towards the Rhône valley before giving birth to the Massa. The Aletsch Glacier is – like most glaciers in the world today – a retreating glacier. As of 2016, since 1980 it lost 1.3 kilometres (0.81 mi) of its length, since 1870 3.2 kilometres (2.0 mi), and lost also more than 300 metres (980 ft) of its thickness.

The whole area, including other glaciers is part of the Jungfrau-Aletsch Protected Area, which was declared a UNESCO World Heritage Site in 2001.

== Geography ==
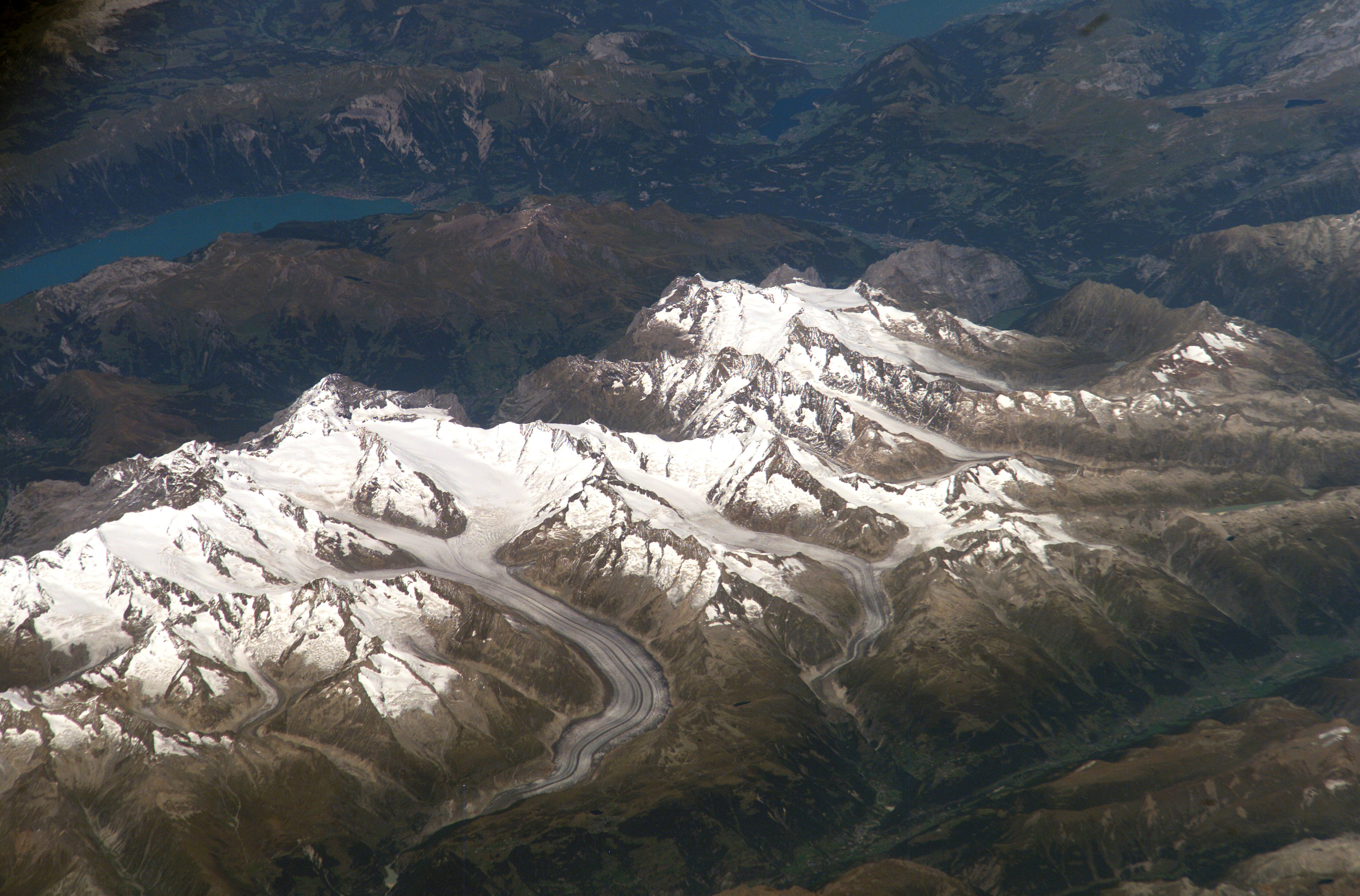
ISS image of the Bernese Alps showing the Wetterhorn (right), Eiger (centre), Jungfrau (left), Lake Brienz (background) and Aletsch glacier (foreground).

The Aletsch Glacier is one of the many glaciers located between the cantons of Bern and Valais on the Bernese Alps located east of the Gemmi Pass. The whole area is considered to be the largest glaciated area in western Eurasia. The Fiescher and Aar Glaciers lying on the east have similar extensions.

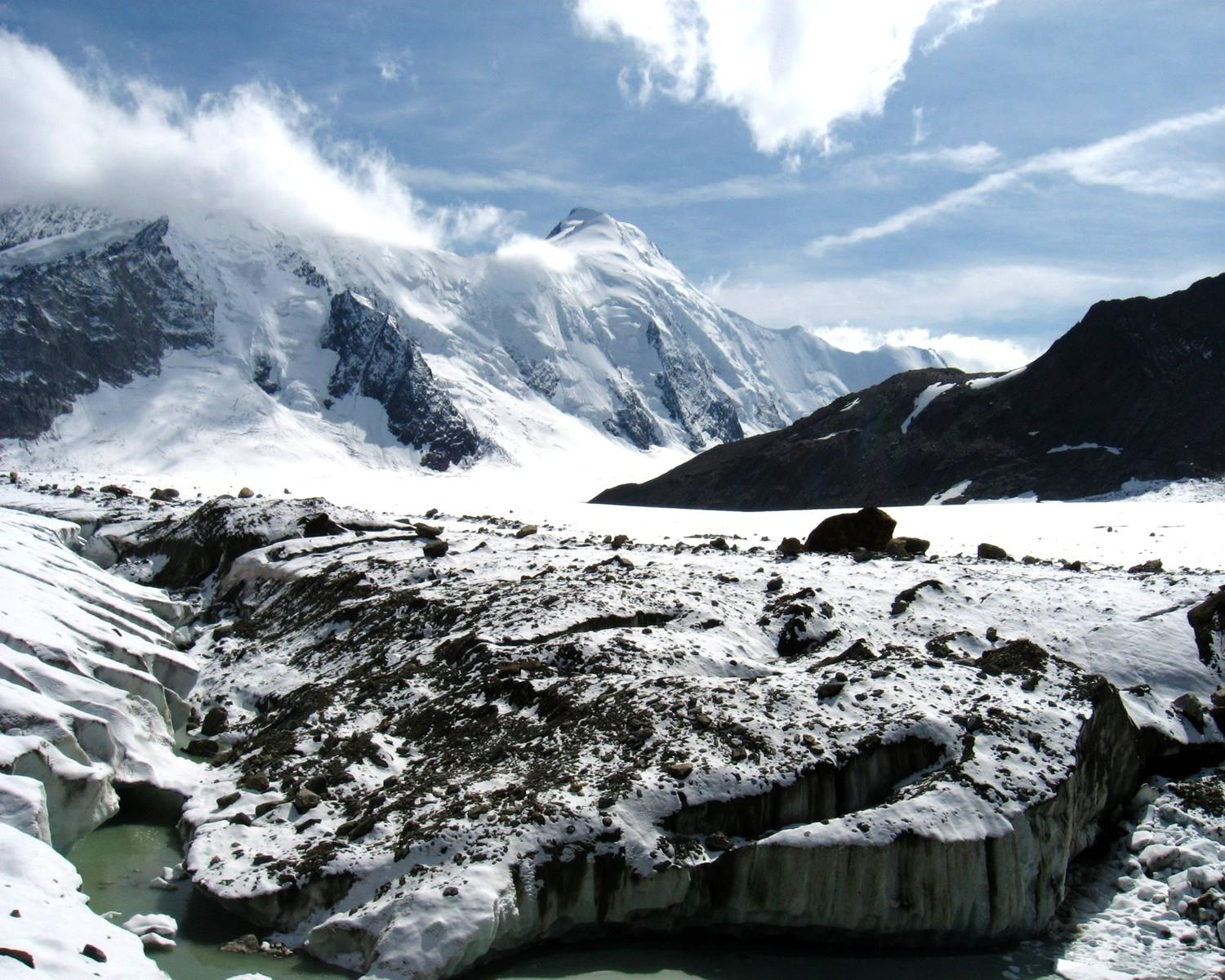
At Konkordiaplatz

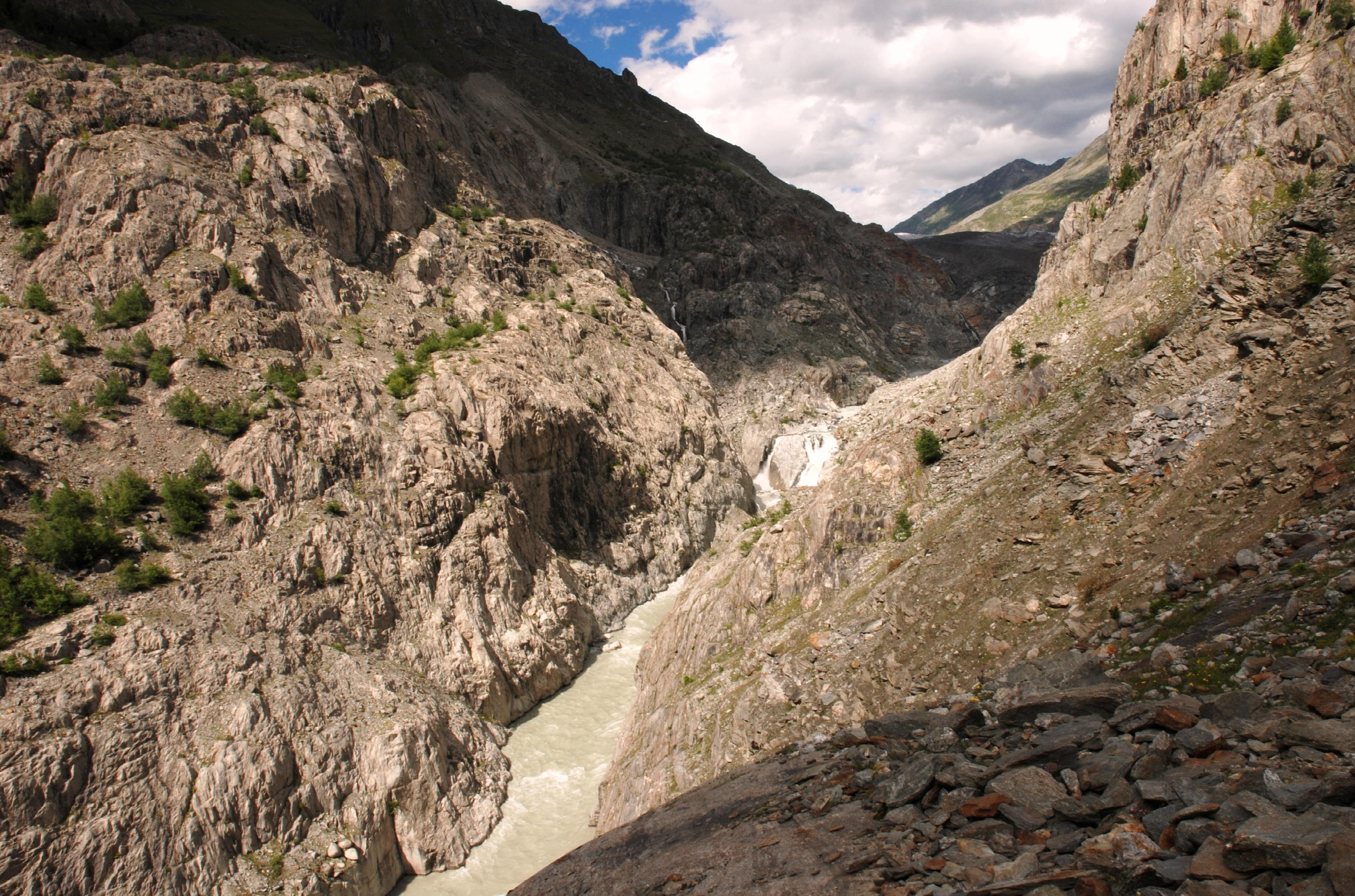
The beginning of the river Massa (the glacier is visible on the right)

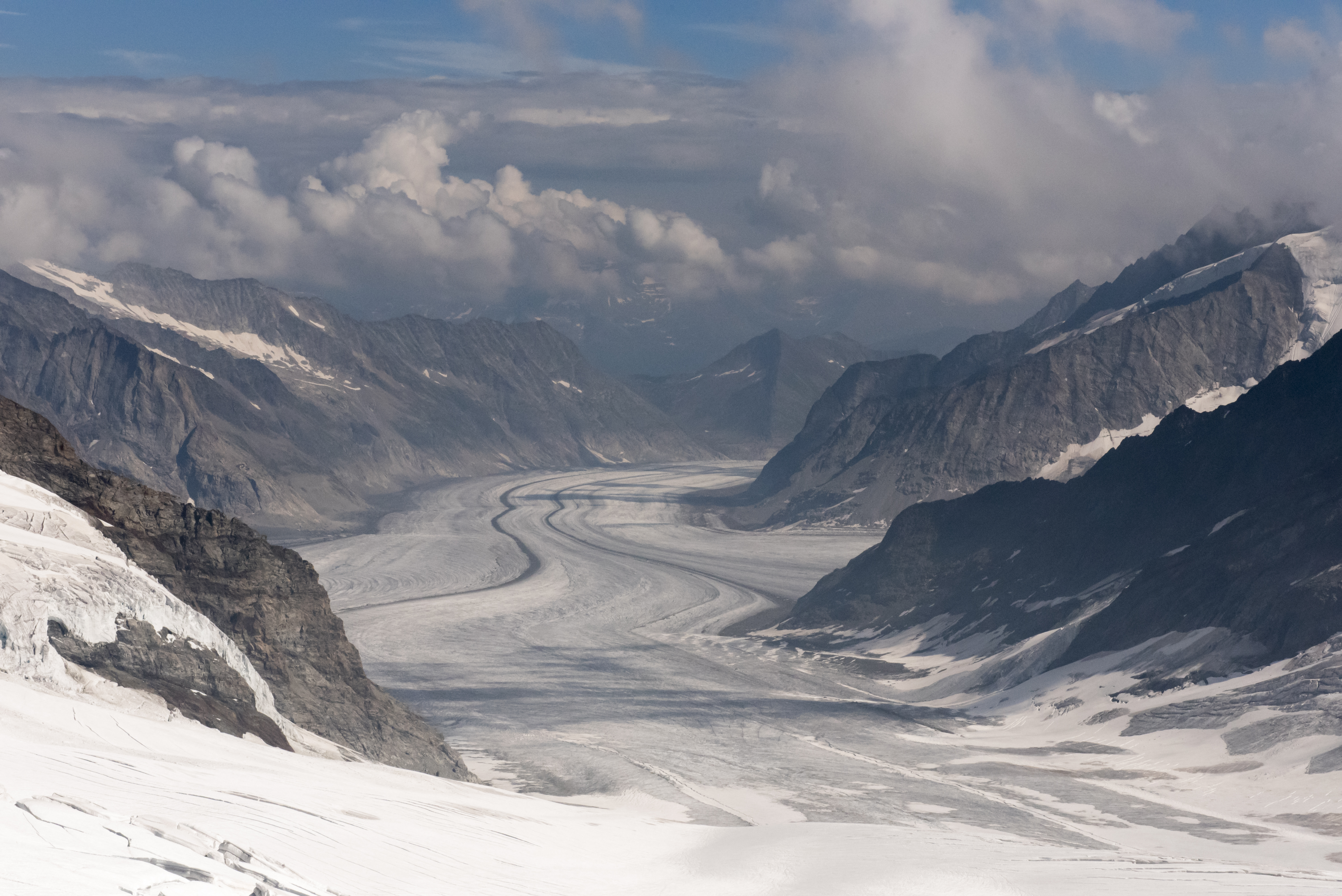
View downhill, from the top of Jungfraufirn

Except the Finsteraarhorn, all the highest summits of the Bernese Alps are located within the drainage basin of the glacier. The Jungfrau and Mönch constitute the northern boundary; the Gross Fiescherhorn and Gross Wannenhorn lie on its east side; finally the culminating point, the Aletschhorn (4,193 m (13,757 ft)) is located on the west side.

Before reaching the maximum flow, four smaller glaciers converge at Konkordiaplatz:

- From the western mouth flows the Grosser Aletschfirn, which runs along the northern foot of the Aletschhorn and Dreieckhorn. The Grosser Aletschfirn is supplied from the north by three notable firns: the Äbeni Flue-Firn, the Gletscherhornfirn, and the Kranzbergfirn. All of these firns have their starting points at around 3,800 m (12,500 ft). From the Äbeni Flue-Firn to the Konkordiaplatz, the Grosser Aletschfirn is 9 km (5.6 mi) long and is on average about 1.5 km (0.93 mi) wide. On the west, the Grosser Aletschfirn connects with the Langgletscher over the 3,158 m (10,361 ft) high glacier pass, the Lötschenlücke, into the Lötschental.
- From the northwestern mouth flows the Jungfraufirn. This firn in fact represents the straight continuation of the Aletsch Glacier, yet is the shortest of the four tributary glaciers. It has its origin on the southern flank of the Mönch and at the eastern flank of the Jungfrau with the Jungfraujoch in-between. Up to the Konkordiaplatz, the Jungfraufirn is a scarce 7 km (4.3 mi) long, and returns to flank the Kranzberg in the west and the Trugberg in the east. At its highest point, it is 2 km (1.2 mi) wide, and further down it is still a good 1 km (0.62 mi) wide.
- From the northern mouth flows the Ewigschneefäld ("Eternal snow field"), where its starting point takes the east flank of the Mönch. In an elbow, it flanks from Trugberg in the west and the Gross Fiescherhorn and Grünhorn in the east, flowing on to the Konkordiaplatz. Up to here, it is about 8 km (5.0 mi) long and averages about 1.2 km (0.75 mi) wide. The mouth at the Konkordiaplatz it follows over a rise with a descent from 25 to 30 percent; here, the glacier is sharply split. Against the north is the Ewigschneefäld over the snow-covered pass of the Unners Mönchsjoch (3,518 m (11,542 ft)), connected with the catchment area of the Ischmeer (Wallis German for "Ice Sea"). Through the Obere Mönchsjoch (3,624 m (11,890 ft)) between the Mönch and the Trugberg stands a connection to the Jungfraufirn.
- From the east, the smallest firn arrives at the Konkordiaplatz: the Grüneggfirn. Its northern arm begins below the Grünegghorn (3,860 m (12,660 ft)). The southern arm collects its snow and ice in the pot flanked by the Wyssnollen, Fiescher Gabelhorn (3,866 m (12,684 ft)), and the Chamm. Between the peaks Wyssnollen and Grünhörnli another glacier pass, the Grünhornlücke (3,279 m (10,758 ft)), connects to the Fieschergletscher. The Grüneggfirn enters the Konkordiaplatz in a gap between the mountainsides Grünegg to the north and the Fülberg to the south. On the western side of the Fülberg the Konkordia hut (mountain hut) overlooks the whole Konkordiaplatz at an altitude of 2,850 m (9,350 ft).

South of Konkordiaplatz, the glacier runs towards the valley of the Oberwallis (Upper Valais); on the east side, near Bettmeralp, lies a small glacier lake, Märjelensee (2,301 m (7,549 feet)); from the western side used to enter the Mittelaletschgletscher, but since the end of the 20th century the connection with the Aletsch Glacier has been lost. Further down, until about 1880, the Oberaletschgletscher did also enter the Aletsch Glacier at its mouth. But since then both glaciers have been retreating so far that they do not connect anymore (the Upper Aletsch Glacier did retreat about 1.3 km (0.81 mi) from its connecting point with the Aletsch Glacier), but both serve now only as the source of the river Massa. The river flows through the Lake Gibidum (a reservoir, and coincidentally representing the glacier's mouth region in the 19th century, which is a retreat of more than 4 km (2.5 mi)) and a gorge of the same name before reaching the Rhône near Brig.

== Tourism ==
The area of the Aletsch Glacier and some surrounding valleys is on the UNESCO World Heritage list, thus it is protected and the facilities are mostly restricted to the external zones. The region between Belalp, Riederalp and Bettmeralp (which is called Aletsch Region) in Valais gives access to the lower part of the glacier. The Bettmerhorn and Eggishorn are popular view points and are accessible by cable car. The Massa river can be crossed since 2008 by a suspension bridge, thus allowing hikes between the left and the right part of the glacier.

The Jungfraujoch railway station (3,450 m) gives a direct access to the upper Aletsch Glacier as well as the normal route to the Jungfrau. It can be reached only from Interlaken in the canton Bern. Hiking paths pass the Konkordia Hut or the Hollandia Hut, eventually reaching other glaciers in the massif.

On the Riederfurka, at 2,065 metres between Riederalp and the glacier, is located the historic Villa Cassel, former summer residence of many famous and influential guests from the worlds of politics and finance. The house is now one of the centers of the environmental organization Pro Natura, which hosts a permanent exhibition about the site.

== Panorama ==
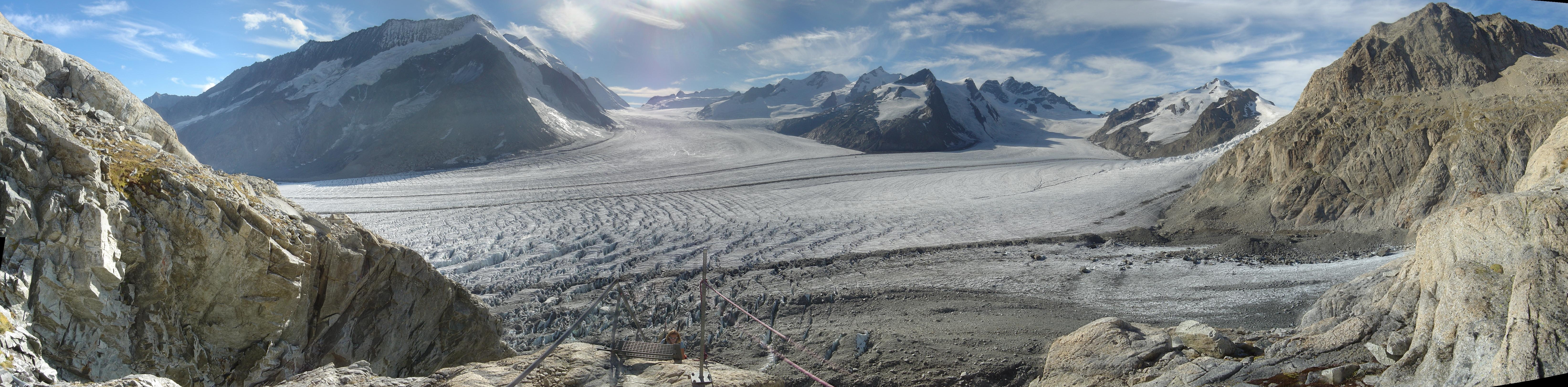
Aletsch Glacier and Konkordiaplatz seen from Konkordia Hut (Sept. 2007)

Also at the mouth of the Konkordiaplatz from the east is the small but important Grüneggfirn (3 km long and averaging 600 m wide). This firn is connected in the over the glacier pass Grünhornlücke (3280 m high) to the Fiescher Glacier in the east.

From the Konkordiaplatz, the Aletsch Glacier has a width of approximately 1.5 km and moves at a rate of 180 m per year to the southeast on course with the Rhône valley, bordering the Dreieckhorn in the west and the great Wannenhorn in the east. It then takes a great right turn and bends ever closer to the southwest, running through the edge of the Eggishorn and Bettmerhorn of the Rhône valley. The lowest part of the great Aletsch Glacier is largely covered with detritus of the lateral and medial moraines. The glacier's toe currently lies about 1560 m high, far beneath the local tree line. From it springs the Massa stream, which flows through the Massa Canyon and is used to generate hydroelectric power. It continues through the upper half of the Brig, eventually entering into the Rhône.

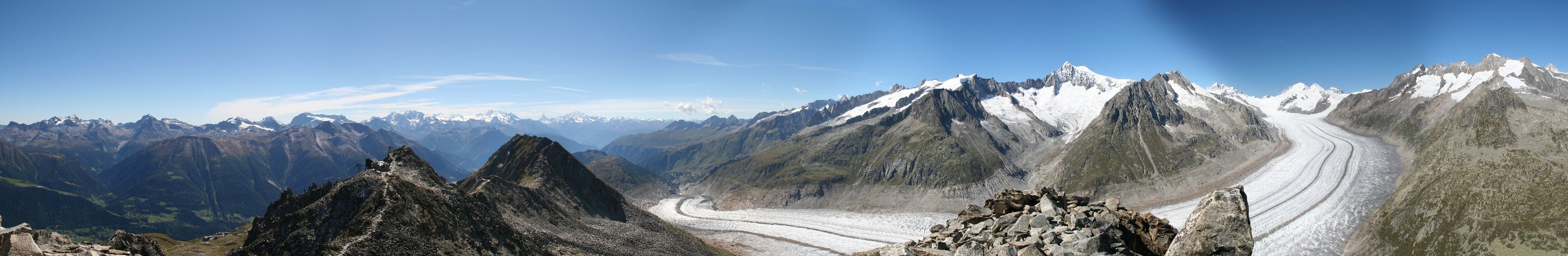
Aletsch Glacier from Eggishorn (Sept. 2007)

The great Aletsch Glacier shows considerable ice cover. At the Konkordiaplatz, it has an ice cover of more than 900 m, but as it moves to the south, the greater part of the ice melts, gradually decreasing the cover to around 150 m.

The characteristically dark medial moraine, situated almost in the middle of the glacier, runs protracted in two bands from the Konkordiaplatz along the whole length to the glacier's toe-zone. This medial moraine is collected from the ice of three large ice fields, which all run together. The westernmost medial moraine has been named the Kranzbergmoräne, and the easternmost carries the name Trugbergmoräne.

== Formation and evolution ==
Slight retreat and some thinning can be seen between 1990 and 2000

The Aletsch Glacier resulted from the accumulation and compaction of snow. Glaciers generally form where snow and ice accumulation exceed snow and ice melt. As the snow and ice thicken it reaches a point where it begins to move due to a combination of gravity and pressure of the overlying snow and ice.

During the last glacial periods, the Aletsch Glacier was much larger than now. 18,000 years ago the lower part of the ridge, between Riederalp and the glacier, was completely covered by ice. Only the summits of the Bettmerhorn, Eggishorn and the Fusshörner were above the glacier. After an important retreat, the glacier again advanced 11,000 years ago during the last glacial period. The glacier reached the Rhône valley, and its ice the Riederfurka. Remaining moraines are still visible in the Aletsch Forest.

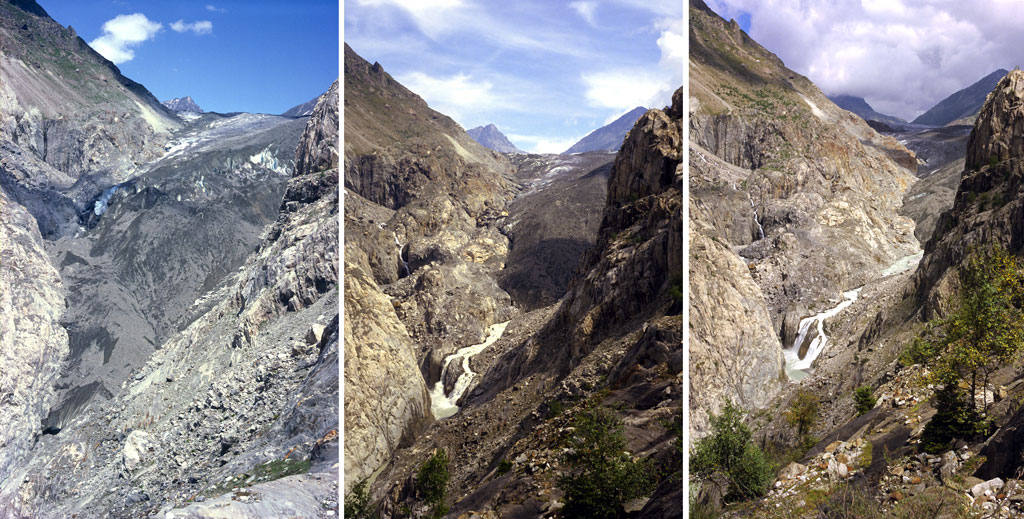
The retreat of Aletsch Glacier in the Swiss Alps (situation in 1979, 1991 and 2002), due to global warming.

Since the last glaciation, the glacier generally retreated. However slight climatic changes happened and, in 1860, the glacier was 3 km longer and the ice level 200 m higher.

As for many other glaciers, records show a major longer-term retreat trend. The Aletsch Glacier receded by 3.2 km (2.0 mi) since 1870, including 1.3 km (0.81 mi) since 1980. A record retreat of 114.6 metres (376 ft) happened in 2006 alone.

Since the end of the Little Ice Age in 1850 the glacier has lost 20 percent of its ice mass, considerably less than other glaciers in Switzerland, which have lost up to 50 percent. This is explained with the large size of the Aletsch Glacier, which reacts much slower to climate change than smaller glaciers. It is however estimated that, by 2100, the glacier will have only one tenth of its 2018 ice mass.

== Photo opportunity ==
On August 18, 2007, photographer Spencer Tunick used hundreds of naked people in a "living sculpture" on the Aletsch Glacier in a photo shoot which he said was intended to draw attention to global warming and the shrinking of the world's glaciers. The temperature was about 10 °C (50 °F) at the time of the photo shoot. The 600 participants on the shrinking glacier said that they had volunteered for Tunick (a collaboration with Greenpeace) to let the world know about the effects of global warming on the melting Swiss glaciers.

== See also ==
- List of glaciers in Switzerland
- List of glaciers
- Retreat of glaciers since 1850
- Swiss Alps
- Vordersee
