= Grosses Wannenhorn =

Mountain in the Bernese Alps

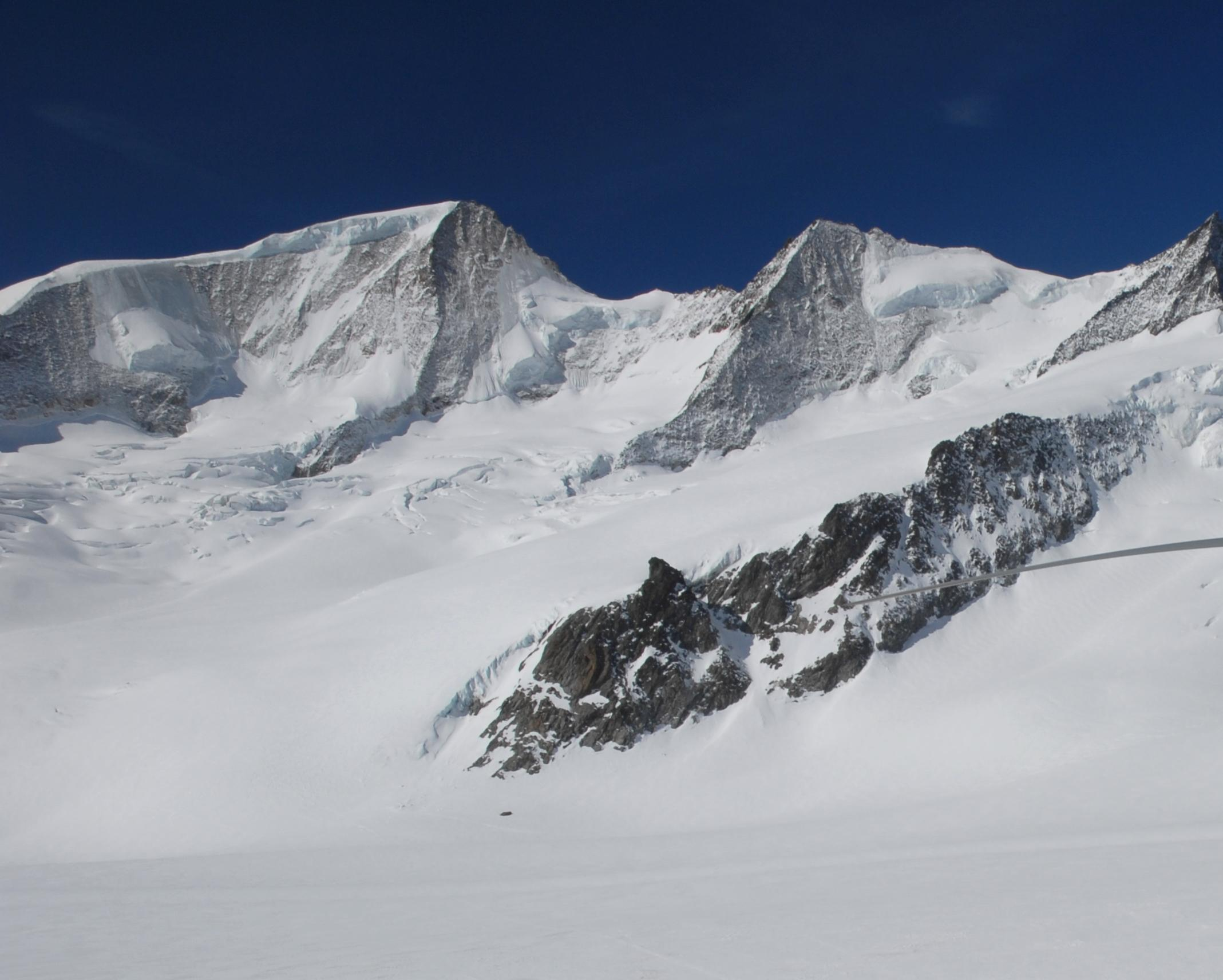
- The Gross Wannenhorn (left) and the Schönbühlhorn (right) from the Fiescher Glacier

Highest point
- Elevation: 3,906 m (12,815 ft)
- Prominence: 636 m (2,087 ft)
- Parent peak: Finsteraarhorn
- Listing: Alpine mountains above 3000 m
- Coordinates: 46°29′37.8″N 8°05′51.5″E

Geography
- Location within Switzerland
- Country: Switzerland
- Canton: Valais
- Parent range: Bernese Alps
- Topo map: swisstopo

Climbing
- First ascent: 1864 (Gottlieb Studer and team)

The Grosses Wannenhorn is a 3906-metre mountain in the Bernese Alps, in the Swiss canton of Valais near the village of Fiesch. It is part of the Walliser Fiescherhörner. The mountain separates the Aletsch Glacier to the west from the Fiescher Glacier to the east.

The east side of the Grosses Wannenhorn is heavily glaciated, while the west side is a steep slope intermittently broken by ice fields. In the southeast, there lies the rocky sub-peak Kleines Wannenhorn (3707 m).

The mountain was first climbed by Gottlieb Studer and team in 1864.

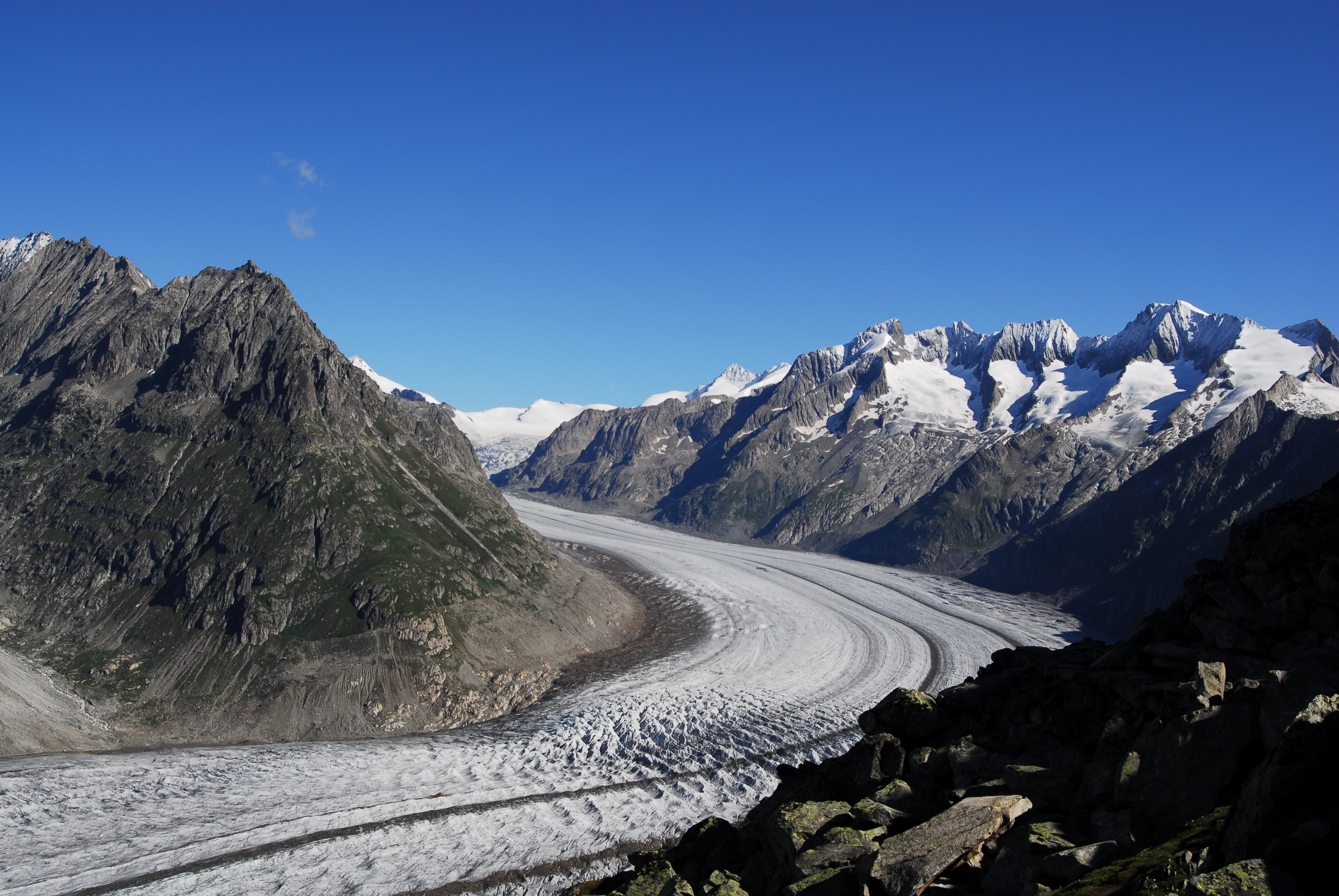
The Aletsch Glacier and the Gross Wannenhorn (right), from the Bettmerhorn

== See also ==
- List of mountains of the Alps above 3000 m
- List of mountains of Switzerland
