= Fiescher Gabelhorn =

Mountain in Switzerland

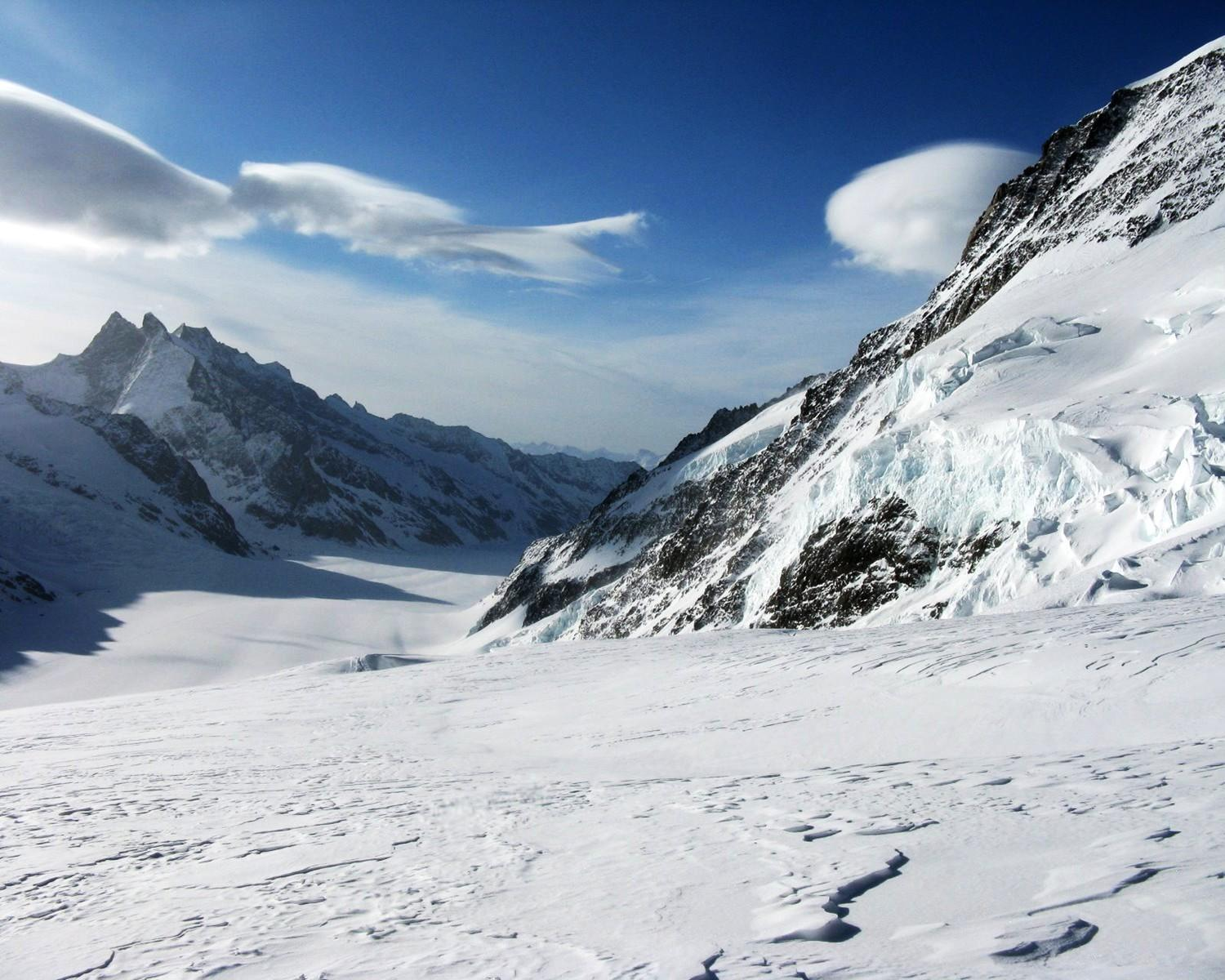
- Fiescher Gabelhorn (far left), from the Aletsch Glacier

Highest point
- Elevation: 3,876 m (12,717 ft)
- Prominence: 152 m (499 ft)
- Parent peak: Gross Wannenhorn
- Coordinates: 46°30′8.4″N 8°5′3.3″E

Geography
- Location within Switzerland
- Location: Valais, Switzerland
- Parent range: Bernese Alps

The Fiescher Gabelhorn is a mountain of the Bernese Alps, overlooking Konkordiaplatz in the canton of Valais.
