= Nasse =

Nasse is a surname. Notable people with the surname include:

- Albert Nasse (1878–1910), American rower
- Christian Friedrich Nasse (1778–1851), German physician and psychiatrist
- Saul Nassé (born 1965), English television producer

See also

- Nasse-setä (Finnish for "Uncle Nasse"), Finnish sketch comedy character
- Nasse Strahlegg, is a peak of the Bernese Alps
- Ward-Nasse Gallery, art gallery for visual, spoken and performing artists in New York City
