= Engelhorn =

Engelhorn may refer to:

- Curt Engelhorn (1926–2016), German businessman
- Grosses Engelhorn, a mountain in Switzerland
- Friedrich Engelhorn (1821–1902), German businessman, founder of BASF
- Shirley Englehorn (1940-2022), American golfer
