= Chistehorn =

Mountain in Switzerland

- Location within Switzerland

Highest point
- Elevation: 2,785 m (9,137 ft)
- Prominence: 143 m (469 ft)
- Coordinates: 46°20′53″N 7°47′5.4″E

Geography
- Location: Valais, Switzerland
- Parent range: Bernese Alps

The Chistehorn is a mountain of the Bernese Alps, overlooking Hohtenn in the canton of Valais. It lies south of the Wannihorn.
