= Bernese Alps =

Part of the Alps mountain range in Switzerland

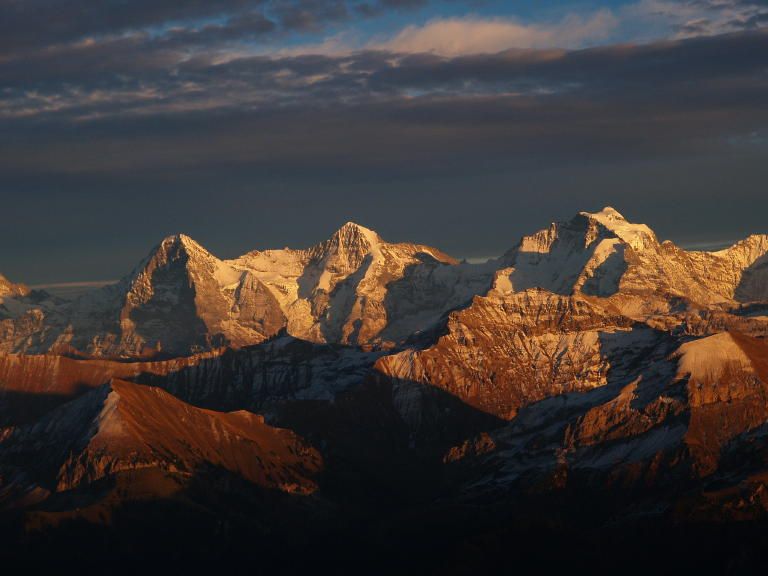
- The Eiger, Mönch, and Jungfrau

Highest point
- Peak: Finsteraarhorn
- Elevation: 4,274 m (14,022 ft)
- Listing: Mountains of the Alps over 4000 m
- Coordinates: 46°32′19″N 8°07′38″E

Naming
- Native name: German: Berner Alpen; French: Alpes bernoises

Geography
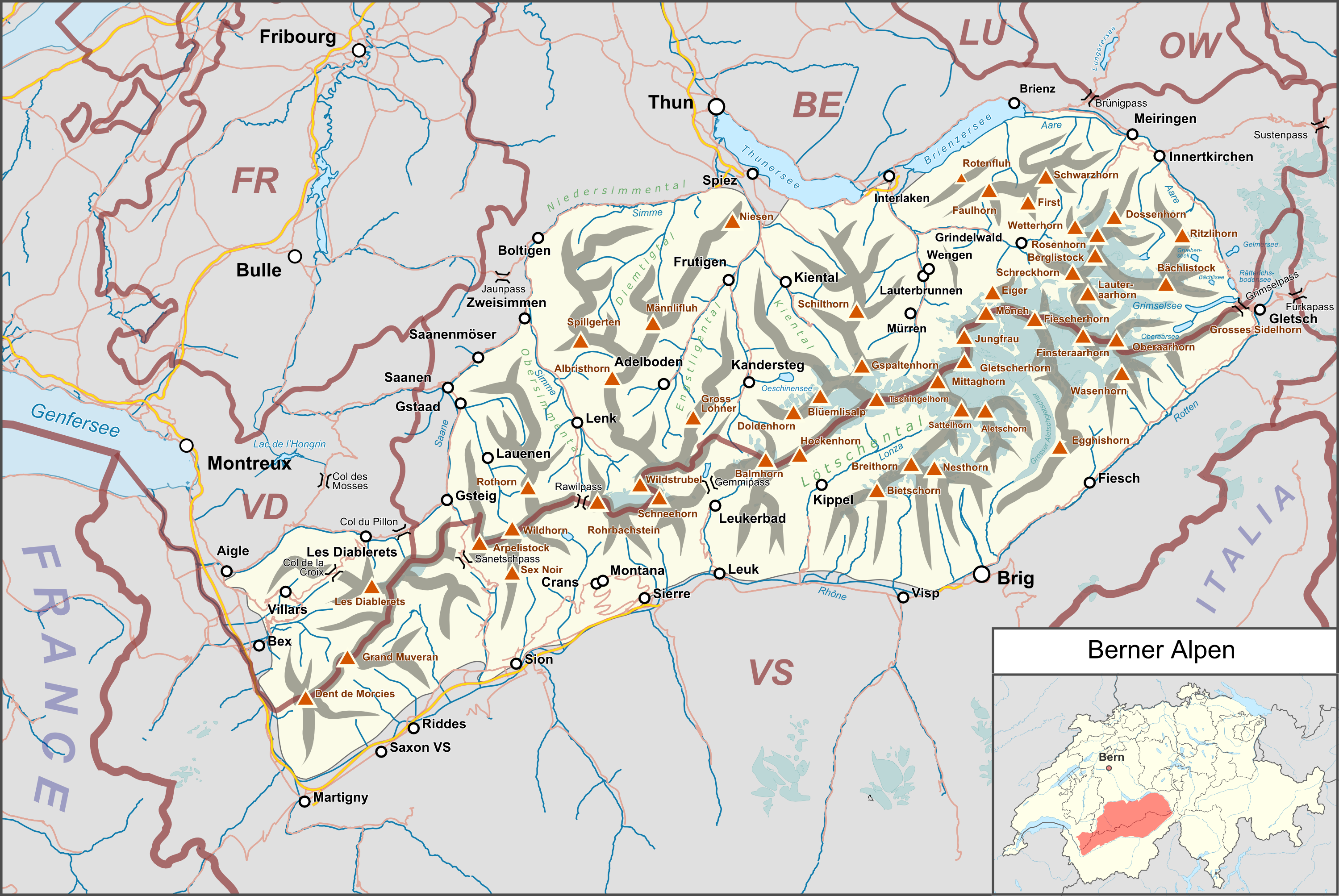
- Map of Bernese Alps and their location in Switzerland (red)
- Country: Switzerland
- Cantons: Bern; Vaud; Fribourg; Valais
- Range coordinates: 46°25′30″N 7°41′37″E
- Parent range: Western Alps
- Borders on: Chablais Alps; Pennine Alps; Lepontine Alps; Uri Alps; Emmental Alps
- Topo map: Swiss Federal Office of Topography swisstopo

The Bernese Alps are a mountain range of the Alps located in western Switzerland. Although the name suggests that they are located in the Berner Oberland region of the canton of Bern, portions of the Bernese Alps are in the adjacent cantons of Valais, Fribourg and Vaud, the latter being usually named Fribourg Alps and Vaud Alps respectively. The highest mountain in the range, the Finsteraarhorn, is also the highest point in the canton of Bern.

The Rhône valley separates them from the Chablais Alps in the west and from the Pennine Alps in the south; the upper Rhône valley separates them from the Lepontine Alps to the southeast; the Grimsel Pass and the Aare valley separates them from the Uri Alps in the east, and from the Emmental Alps in the north; their northwestern edge is not well defined, describing a line roughly from Lake Geneva to Lake Thun. The Bernese Alps are drained by the river Aare and its tributary the Saane in the north, the Rhône in the south, and the Reuss in the east.

The Bernese Alps are amongst the three highest major subranges of the Alps, together with the Pennine Alps and the Mont Blanc massif.

== Geography ==
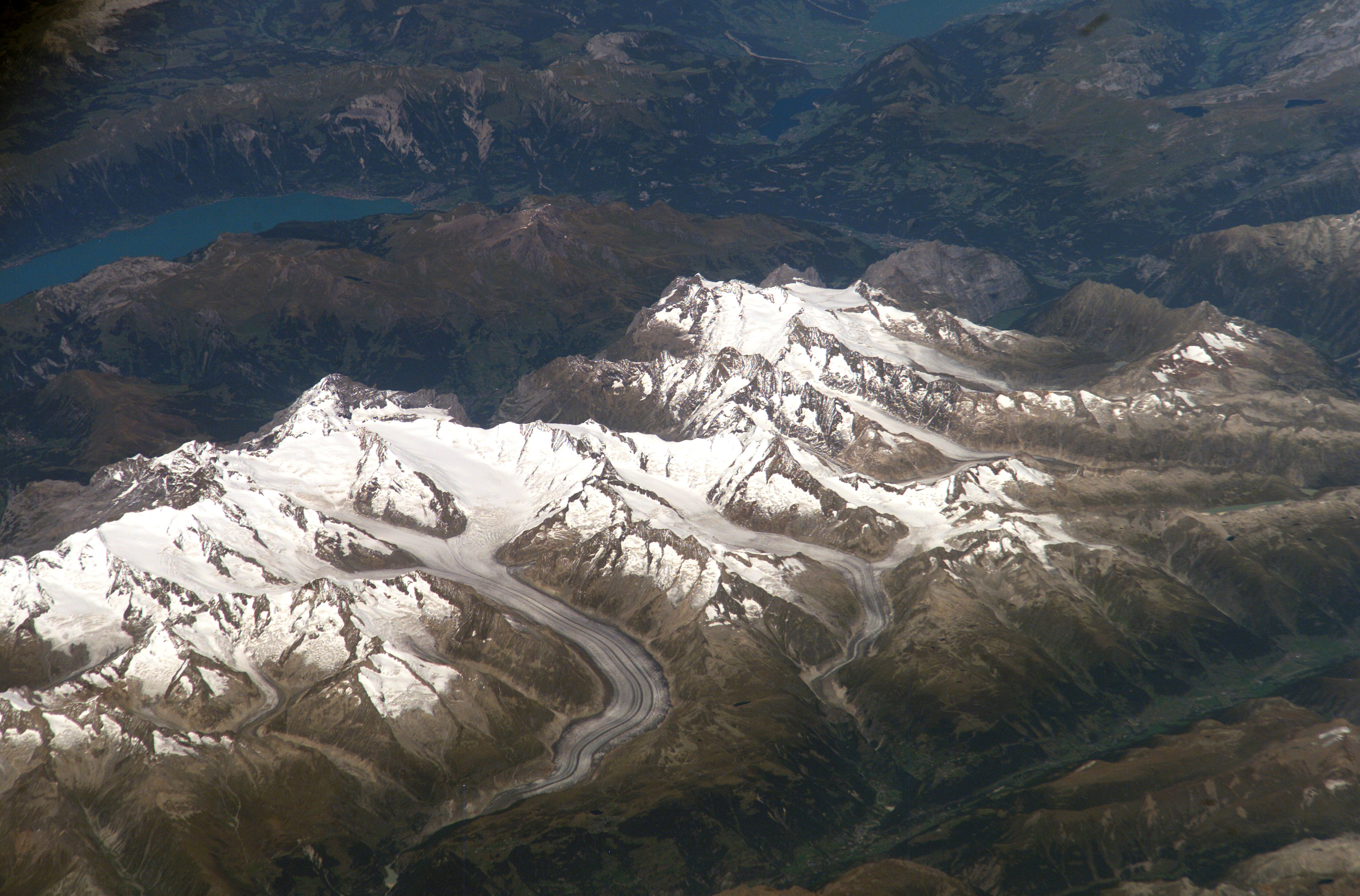
ISS image of the Bernese Alps showing the Wetterhorn (right), Eiger (centre), Jungfrau (left), Lake Brienz (background) and Aletsch glacier (foreground).

One of the most prominent Alpine ranges, the Bernese Alps extend from the gorge of Saint-Maurice, through which the Rhône finds its way to Lake Geneva, to the Grimsel Pass or, depending on the definition, to the river Reuss (thus including the Uri Alps). The principal ridge, a chain that runs 100 kilometres (62 mi) from west (Dent de Morcles) to east (Sidelhorn), whose highest peak is the Finsteraarhorn, forms the watershed between the cantons of Bern and Valais. Except for the westernmost part, it is also the watershed between the Rhine (North Sea) and the Rhône (Mediterranean Sea). This chain is not centered inside the range but lies close (10 to 15 km) to the Rhône on the south. This makes a large difference between the south, where the lateral short valleys descend abruptly into the deep trench forming the valley of the Rhône and the north, where the Bernese Alps extends through a great part of the canton of Bern (Bernese Oberland), throwing out branches to the west into the adjoining cantons of Vaud and Fribourg. There the mountains progressively become lower and disappear into the hilly Swiss Plateau. The Bernese Alps have a large influence on the climate of Switzerland: while their north side is very exposed to weather, their south side is protected from it. As a consequence, agriculture consists essentially of dairy farming and cattle breeding on the northern foothills, while on the sunnier southern foothills (Rhone Valley) it also consists of vineyards.

Gemmi Pass is the most central of the major passes through the main chain. It also marks the separation between two distinct sections of the Bernese Alps: the chain west of Gemmi Pass, consisting mainly of foothills with a few large glacier-covered mountains (notably Dent de Morcles, Grand Muveran, Diablerets, Wildhorn and Wildstrubel) around 3,000 metres (9,800 ft), and the chain east of Gemmi Pass, consisting mainly of summits around 4,000 metres (13,000 ft) on several subranges, with large valley glaciers between them. The latter section, contrary to the former, has very few foothills and is the most glaciated part of the Alps.

A characteristic in the orography of the Bernese Alps is, that whereas the western portion of that chain consists of a single series of summits with comparatively short projecting buttresses, the higher group presents a series of longitudinal ridges parallel to the axis of the main chain, and separated from each other by deep valleys that form the channels of great glaciers. Thus the Tschingel Glacier and the Kander Glacier, separate the portion of the main range lying between the Gemmi Pass and the Mittaghorn from the equally high parallel range of the Doldenhorn and Blümlisalp on its northern side. To the south, the same portion of the main range is divided from the still higher parallel range whose summits are the Aletschhorn and the Bietschhorn by the Lötschental and the Lötschenlücke. To this again succeeds the deep trench through which the lower part of the Aletsch Glacier flows down to the Rhône, enclosed by the minor ridge that culminates at the Eggishorn.

It is in the central and eastern portions of the range only that crystalline rocks make their appearance; the western part is composed almost exclusively of sedimentary deposits, and the secondary ridges extending through Bern and the adjoining cantons are formed of jurassic, cretaceous, or eocene strata.

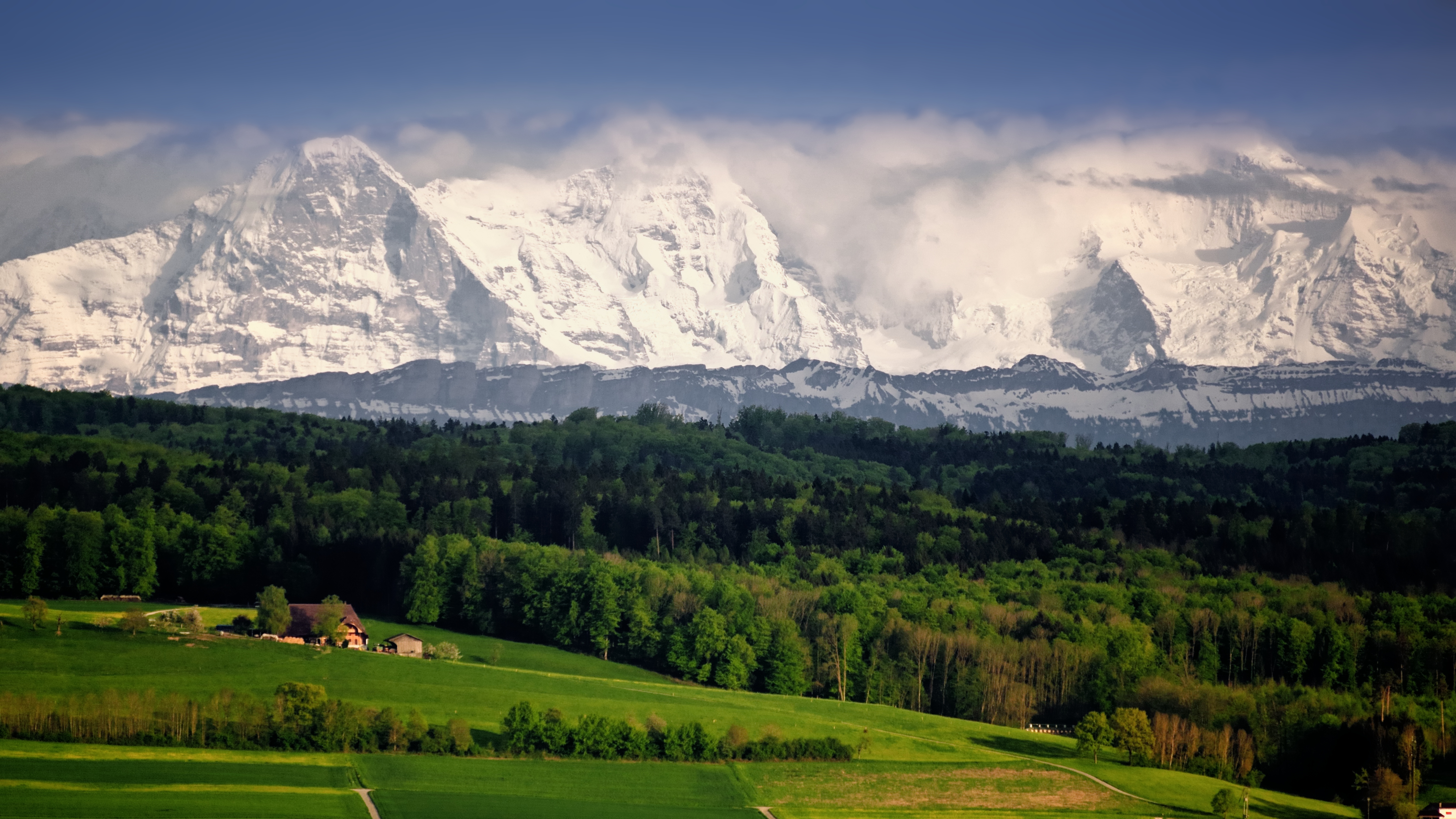
The north side of the Bernese Alps from across the Swiss Plateau

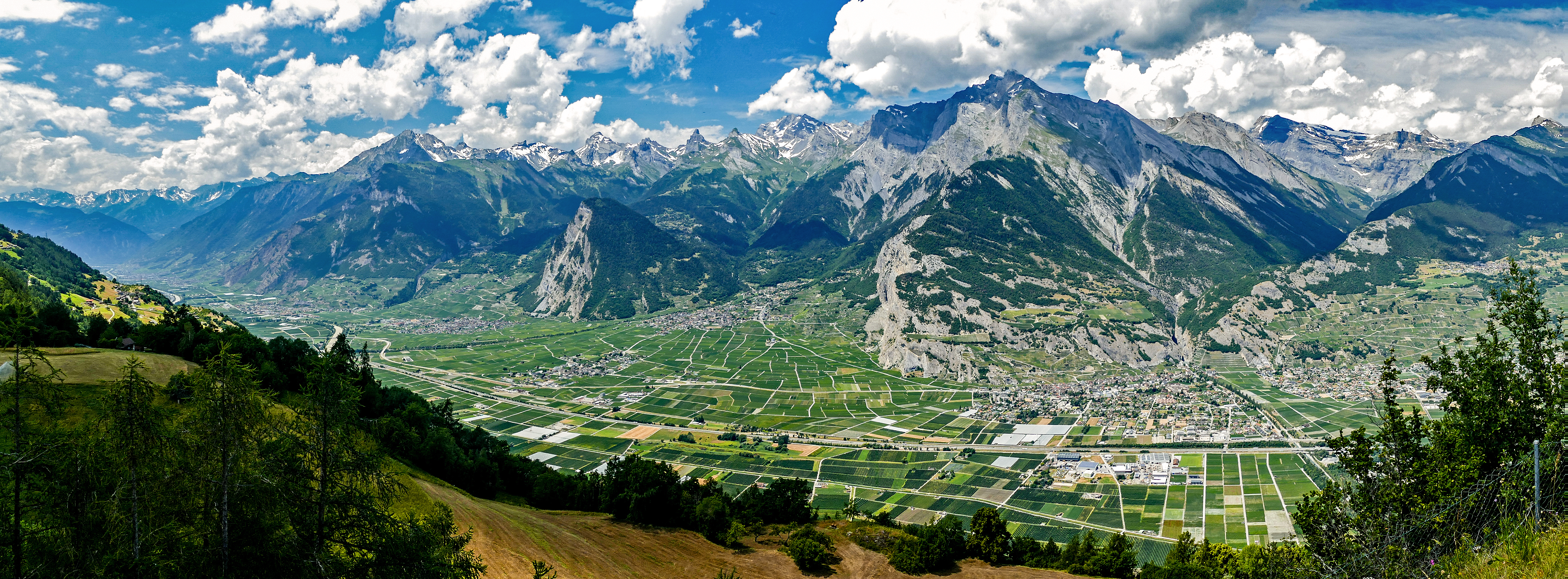
The south side of the Bernese Alps from across the Rhone Valley

== Exploration ==
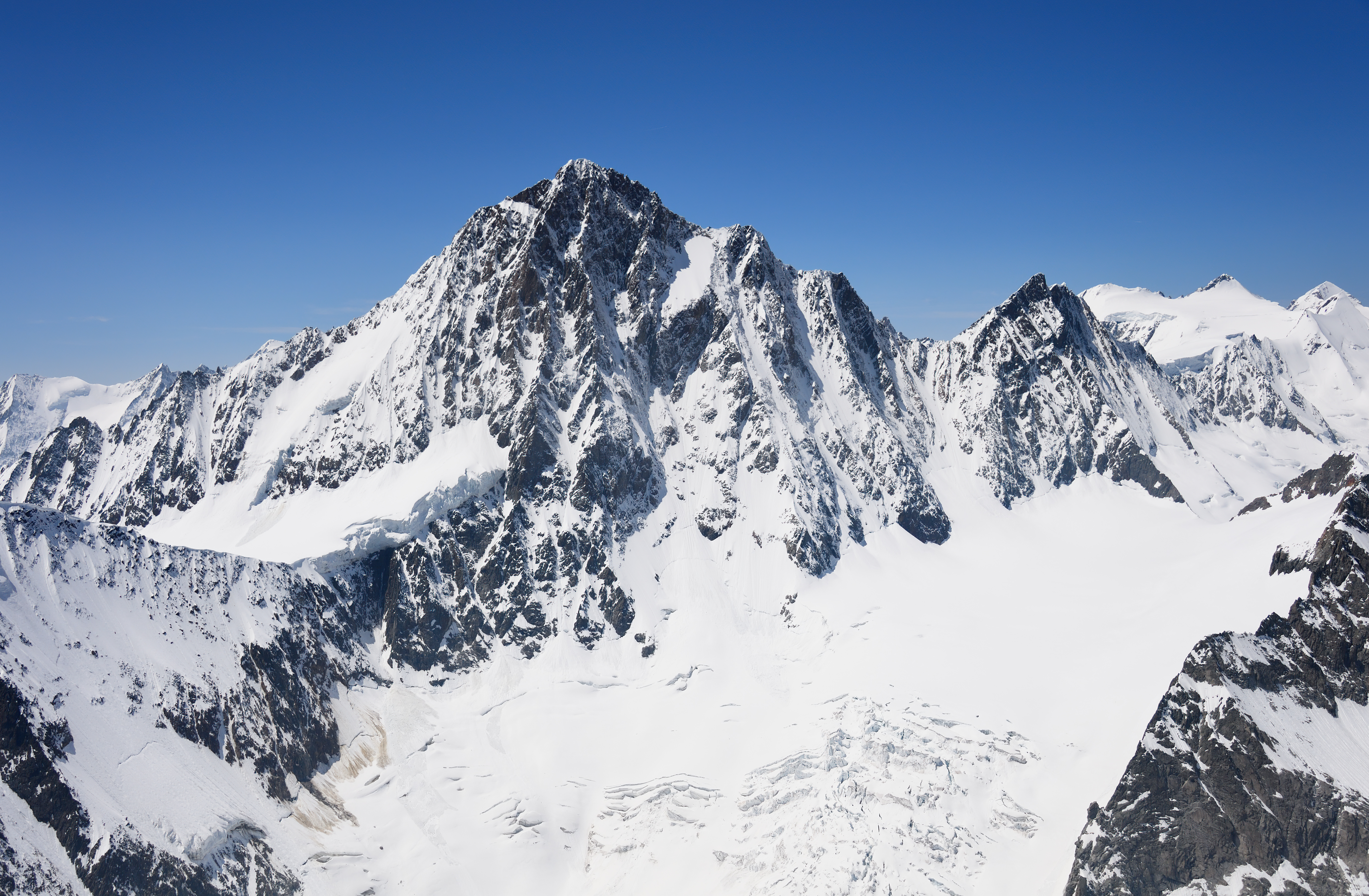
The Finsteraarhorn is the highest mountain in the Bernese Alps. It is also one of the remotest locations in Switzerland.

The beauty of the scenery and the facilities offered to travellers by the general extension of mountain railways make the northern side of the range, the Bernese Oberland, one of the portions of the Alps most visited by tourists. Since strangers first began to visit the Alps, the names of Grindelwald, Lauterbrunnen, and Interlaken have become famous. But unlike many other Alpine regions, which have been left to be explored by strangers, this region has been long visited by Swiss travellers and men of science. Among them were the brother Meyer of Aarau and Franz Joseph Hugi. They have explored most of the mountain ranges not very difficult to access, and have climbed most of the higher summits. In 1841, Louis Agassiz, with several scientific friends, established a temporary station on the Unteraar Glacier, and, along with scientific observations on the glaciers, started a series of expeditions. Several mountains in the area are named after Agassiz and the other explorers. The works of Desor and Gottlieb Studer have been followed by several other publications that bear testimony to Swiss mountaineering activity. Notwithstanding the activity of their predecessors, the members of the English Alpine Club have found scope for further exploits, amongst which may be reckoned the first ascents of the Aletschhorn and the Schreckhorn, and the still more arduous enterprise of crossing the range bypasses, such as the Jungfraujoch and Eigerjoch, which are considered among the most difficult in the Alps.

== Jungfrau-Aletsch area ==
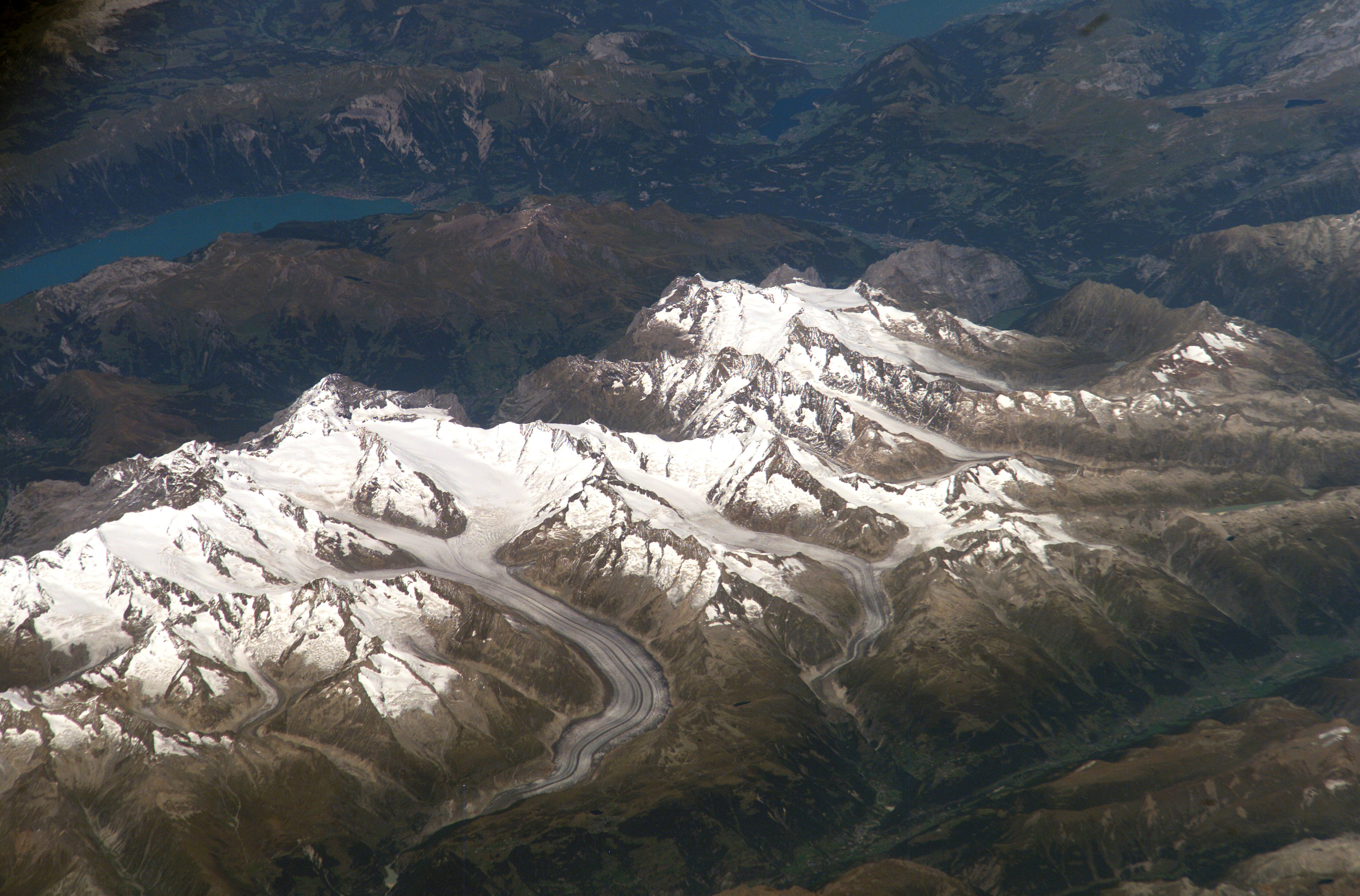
Jungfrau-Aletsch area seen from space

The Jungfrau-Aletsch area is located in the eastern Bernese Alps in the most glaciated region of the Alps. It was inscribed as a UNESCO World Heritage Site (Swiss Alps Jungfrau-Aletsch) in 2001 and further expanded in 2007. Its name comes from the Aletsch Glacier and the two summits of the Jungfrau and Bietschhorn, which constitute some of the most impressive features of the site. The actual site (after the extension) includes other large glacier valleys such as the Fiescher Glacier and the Aar Glaciers.

== List of peaks ==
The chief peaks of the Bernese Alps are:

Name	Elevation
Finsteraarhorn	4,274 m (14,022 ft)
Aletschhorn	4,194 m (13,760 ft)
Jungfrau	4,158 m (13,642 ft)
Mönch	4,110 m (13,484 ft)
Schreckhorn	4,078 m (13,379 ft)
Grosses Fiescherhorn	4,049 m (13,284 ft)
Grünhorn	4,043 m (13,264 ft)
Lauteraarhorn	4,042 m (13,261 ft)
Hinteres Fiescherhorn	4,025 m (13,205 ft)
Gletscherhorn	3,982 m (13,064 ft)
Rottalhorn	3,971 m (13,028 ft)
Eiger	3,967 m (13,015 ft)
Ebnefluh	3,961 m (12,995 ft)
Agassizhorn	3,947 m (12,949 ft)
Bietschhorn	3,934 m (12,907 ft)
Trugberg	3,932 m (12,900 ft)
Klein Grünhorn	3,912 m (12,835 ft)
Gross Wannenhorn	3,906 m (12,815 ft)
Kleines Fiescherhorn	3,895 m (12,779 ft)
Mittaghorn	3,893 m (12,772 ft)
Fiescher Gabelhorn	3,876 m (12,717 ft)
Schönbühlhorn	3,854 m (12,644 ft)
Nesthorn	3,820 m (12,533 ft)
Dreieckhorn	3,811 m (12,503 ft)
Schinhorn	3,796 m (12,454 ft)
Breithorn (Blatten)	3,784 m (12,415 ft)
Breithorn (Lauterbrunnen)	3,780 m (12,402 ft)
Grosshorn	3,754 m (12,316 ft)
Sattelhorn	3,744 m (12,283 ft)
Kranzberg	3,741 m (12,274 ft)
Geisshorn	3,740 m (12,270 ft)
Klein Lauteraarhorn	3,738 m (12,264 ft)
Silberhorn	3,704 m (12,152 ft)
Mittelhorn	3,702 m (12,146 ft)
Rotstock	3,699 m (12,136 ft)
Balmhorn	3,697 m (12,129 ft)
Wetterhorn	3,690 m (12,106 ft)
Rosenhorn	3,689 m (12,103 ft)
Blüemlisalphorn	3,660 m (12,008 ft)
Bärglistock	3,655 m (11,991 ft)
Breitlauihorn	3,654 m (11,988 ft)
Hugihorn	3,647 m (11,965 ft)
Doldenhorn	3,638 m (11,936 ft)
Altels	3,630 m (11,909 ft)
Gross Fusshorn	3,627 m (11,900 ft)
Tschingelhorn	3,555 m (11,663 ft)
Lonzahörner	3,559 m (11,677 ft)
Unterbächhorn	3,554 m (11,660 ft)
Finsteraarrothorn	3,530 m (11,581 ft)
Galmihorn	3,507 m (11,506 ft)
Mittleres Wysshorn	3,545 m (11,631 ft)
Kleines Schreckhorn	3,495 m (11,467 ft)
Nasse Strahlegg	3,485 m (11,434 ft)
Lauteraar Rothörner	3,477 m (11,407 ft)
Wasenhorn	3,447 m (11,309 ft)
Gspaltenhorn	3,436 m (11,273 ft)
Ewigschneehorn	3,330 m (10,925 ft)
Tschingelspitz	3,315 m (10,876 ft)
Olmenhorn	3,314 m (10,873 ft)
Hienderstock	3,307 m (10,850 ft)
Wilerhorn	3,307 m (10,850 ft)
Hockenhorn	3,293 m (10,804 ft)
Ritzlihorn	3,277 m (10,751 ft)
Hogleifa	3,276 m (10,748 ft)
Wildhorn	3,250 m (10,663 ft)
Bächlistock	3,246 m (10,650 ft)
Wildstrubel	3,244 m (10,643 ft)
Birghorn	3,243 m (10,640 ft)
Hohstock	3,225 m (10,581 ft)
Diablerets	3,216 m (10,551 ft)
Stockhorn	3,211 m (10,535 ft)
Sackhorn	3,204 m (10,512 ft)
Petersgrat	3,202 m (10,505 ft)
Strahlhorn (Baltschieder)	3,201 m (10,502 ft)
Wellhorn	3,191 m (10,469 ft)
Firehorn	3,182 m (10,440 ft)
Steinlauihorn	3,161 m (10,371 ft)
Wannihorn	3,116 m (10,223 ft)
Brandlammhorn	3,108 m (10,197 ft)
Mettenberg	3,104 m (10,184 ft)
Schwarzhorn	3,104 m (10,184 ft)
Löffelhorn	3,096 m (10,157 ft)
Tieregghorn	3,072 m (10,079 ft)
Geltenhorn	3,062 m (10,046 ft)
Grand Muveran	3,051 m (10,010 ft)
Mutthorn	3,037 m (9,964 ft)
Arpelistock	3,036 m (9,961 ft)
Sparrhorn	3,020 m (9,908 ft)
Wiwannihorn	3,000 m (9,843 ft)
Torrenthorn	2,998 m (9,836 ft)
Brünberg	2,982 m (9,783 ft)
Schilthorn	2,973 m (9,754 ft)
Dent de Morcles	2,969 m (9,741 ft)
Gärsthorn	2,964 m (9,724 ft)
Eggishorn	2,934 m (9,626 ft)
Schwarzhorn	2,930 m (9,613 ft)
Ritzihorn	2,891 m (9,485 ft)
Wildgärst	2,891 m (9,485 ft)
Gross Sidelhorn	2,881 m (9,452 ft)
Alplistock	2,878 m (9,442 ft)
Risihorn	2,876 m (9,436 ft)
Bettmerhorn	2,872 m (9,423 ft)
Gallauistöck	2,869 m (9,413 ft)
Gstellihorn	2,855 m (9,367 ft)
Innerer Fisistock	2,787 m (9,144 ft)
Grosses Engelhorn	2,782 m (9,127 ft)
Chistehorn	2,785 m (9,137 ft)
Niwen	2,769 m (9,085 ft)
Albristhorn	2,764 m (9,068 ft)
Bietenhorn	2,756 m (9,042 ft)
Ärmighorn	2,742 m (8,996 ft)
Tschingellochtighorn	2,735 m (8,973 ft)
Klein Wellhorn	2,701 m (8,862 ft)
Mittaghorn	2,686 m (8,812 ft)
Birg	2,684 m (8,806 ft)
Faulhorn	2,683 m (8,802 ft)
Schwarzmönch	2,649 m (8,691 ft)
Mont à Cavouère	2,612 m (8,570 ft)
Schluchhorn	2,579 m (8,461 ft)
Bunderspitz	2,546 m (8,353 ft)
Sulegg	2,412 m (7,913 ft)
Niesen	2,366 m (7,762 ft)
Pic Chaussy	2,351 m (7,713 ft)
Tête du Portail	2,335 m (7,661 ft)
Rauflihorn	2,323 m (7,621 ft)
Gebidum	2,317 m (7,602 ft)
Wiriehorn	2,304 m (7,559 ft)
Furggenspitz	2,297 m (7,536 ft)
Pointe des Savolaires	2,294 m (7,526 ft)
Oltschiburg	2,234 m (7,329 ft)
Riederhorn	2,230 m (7,316 ft)
Vanil Carré	2,197 m (7,208 ft)
Regenboldshorn	2,193 m (7,195 ft)
Hochmatt	2,152 m (7,060 ft)
Rüdigenspitze	2,124 m (6,969 ft)
Le Chamossaire	2,116 m (6,942 ft)
Rocher du Midi	2,097 m (6,880 ft)
Vanil d'Arpille	2,085 m (6,841 ft)
Dent de Combette	2,082 m (6,831 ft)
Hohmad	2,076 m (6,811 ft)
Hohmädli	2,021 m (6,631 ft)
Wätterlatte	2,007 m (6,585 ft)
Vanil des Cours	1,562 m (5,125 ft)

== Glaciers ==
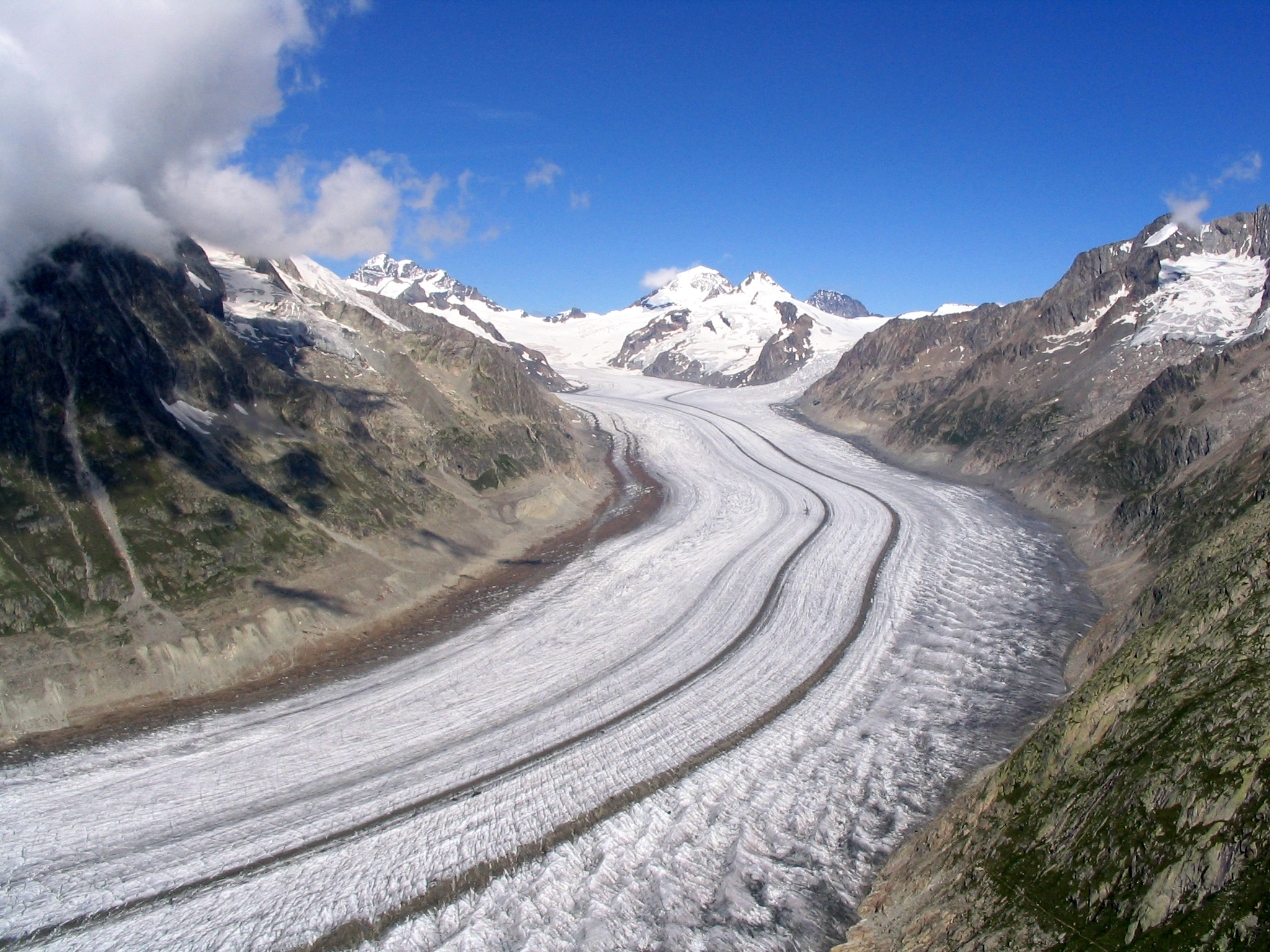
The Aletsch Glacier is the largest glacier in the Alps.

Main glaciers:

- Aletsch Glacier
- Fiescher Glacier
- Unteraar Glacier
- Lower Grindelwald Glacier
- Oberaletsch Glacier
- Mittelaletsch Glacier
- Gauli Glacier
- Lang Glacier
- Upper Grindelwald Glacier
- Kander Glacier
- Tschingel Glacier
- Rosenlaui Glacier
- Plaine Morte Glacier
- Wildstrubel Glacier
- Tsanfleuron Glacier
- Diablerets Glacier

== List of mountains lakes ==
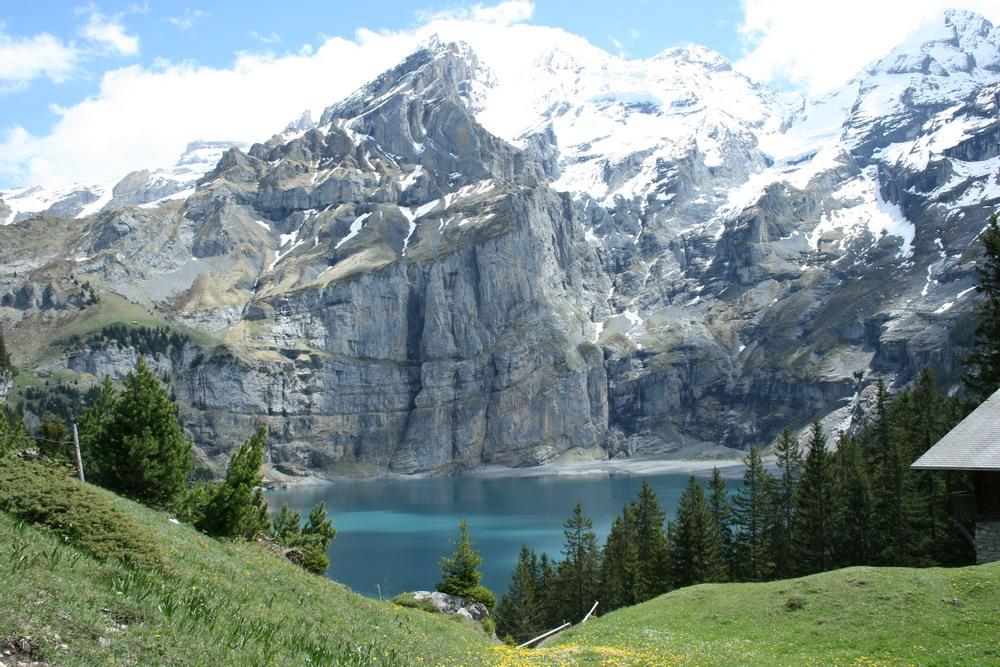
Oeschinensee

- Grimselsee
- Oberaarsee
- Lac de Tseuzier
- Daubensee
- Lac de Sénin
- Oschinensee

== List of passes ==
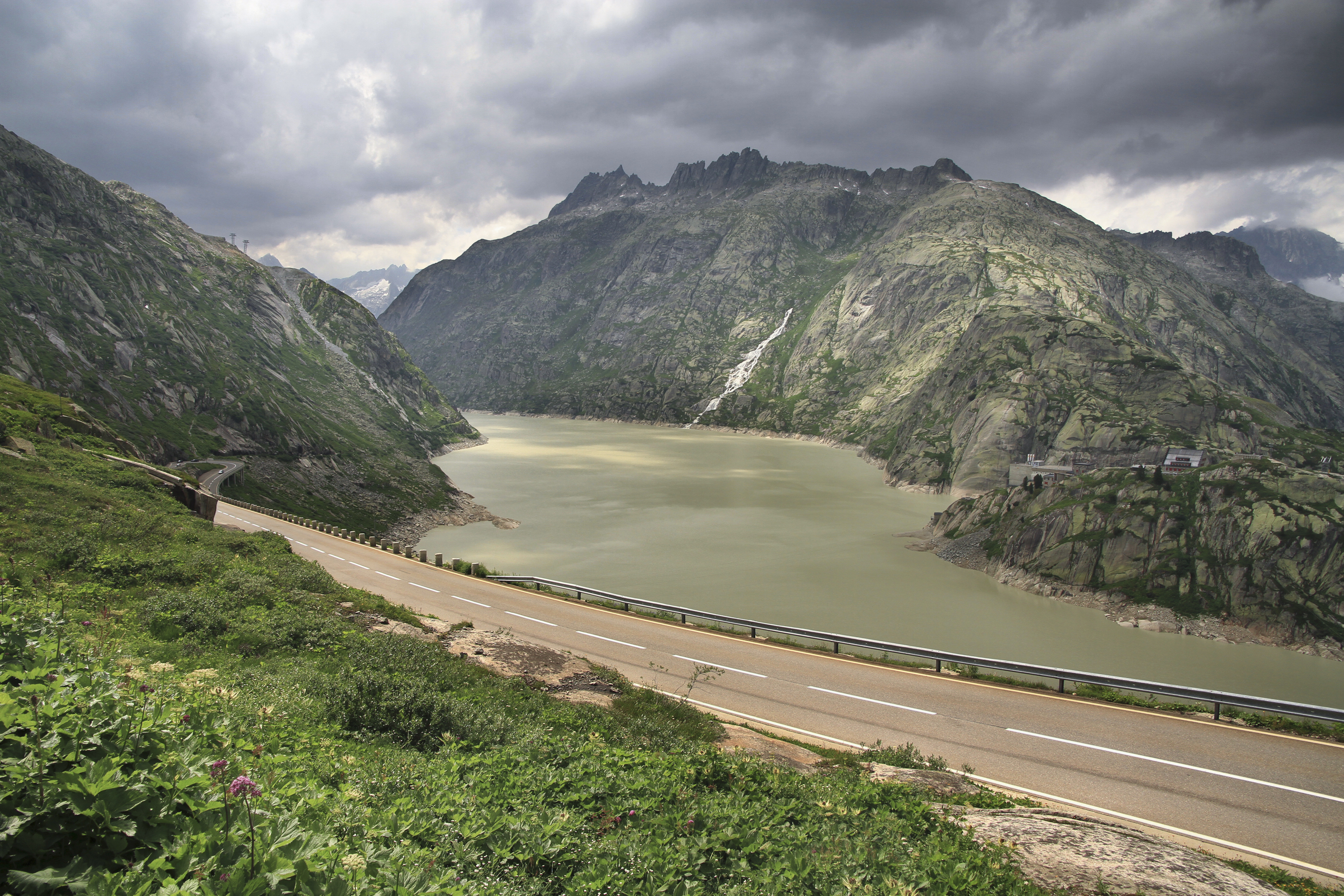
The road of the Grimsel Pass is the only one connecting the cantons of Bern and Valais.

The chief passes of the Bernese Alps are:

Mountain pass	Location	Type	Elevation
Lauitor	Lauterbrunnen to the Eggishorn	Snow	3,700 m (12,139 ft)
Mönchjoch	Grindelwald to the Eggishorn	Snow	3,560 m (11,680 ft)
Jungfraujoch	Wengernalp to the Eggishorn	Snow	3,470 m (11,385 ft)
Strahlegg	Grindelwald to the Grimsel Pass	Snow	3,351 m (10,994 ft)
Grünhornlücke	Great Aletsch Glacier to the Fiescher Glacier	Snow	3,305 m (10,843 ft)
Oberaarjoch	Grimsel to the Eggishorn	Snow	3,233 m (10,607 ft)
Gauli	Grimsel to Meiringen	Snow	3,206 m (10,518 ft)
Petersgrat	Lauterbrunnen to the Lötschental	Snow	3,205 m (10,515 ft)
Lötschenlücke	Lötschental to the Eggishorn	Snow	3,204 m (10,512 ft)
Lauteraarsattel	Grindelwald to the Grimsel	Snow	3,156 m (10,354 ft)
Beichgrat	Lötschental to the Belalp	Snow	3,136 m (10,289 ft)
Lammernjoch	Lenk to the Gemmi	Snow	3,132 m (10,276 ft)
Gamchilucke	Kiental to Lauterbrunnen	Snow	2,833 m (9,295 ft)
Tschiugel	Lauterbrunnen to Kandersteg	Snow	2,824 m (9,265 ft)
Hohtürli	Kandersteg to the Kiental	Footpath	2,707 m (8,881 ft)
Lötschen	Kandersteg to the Lötschental	Snow	2,695 m (8,842 ft)
Sefinenfurgge	Lauterbrunnen to the Kiental	Footpath	2,616 m (8,583 ft)
Rawil	Sion to Lenk im Simmental	Bridle path	2,415 m (7,923 ft)
Gemmi	Kandersteg to Leukerbad	Bridle path	2,329 m (7,641 ft)
Sanetsch	Sion to Saanen	Bridle path	2,234 m (7,329 ft)
Grimsel	Meiringen to the Rhône Glacier	Road	2,164 m (7,100 ft)
Kleine Scheidegg	Grindelwald to Lauterbrunnen	Path, railway	2,064 m (6,772 ft)
Cheville	Sion to Bex	Bridle path	2,049 m (6,722 ft)
Grosse Scheidegg	Grindelwald to Meiringen	road (restricted to buses)	1,967 m (6,453 ft)

== See also ==
- Bernese Alps in the wide meaning
- Swiss Alps
- The Alps (documentary film)
