= Risihorn =

Mountain in Switzerland

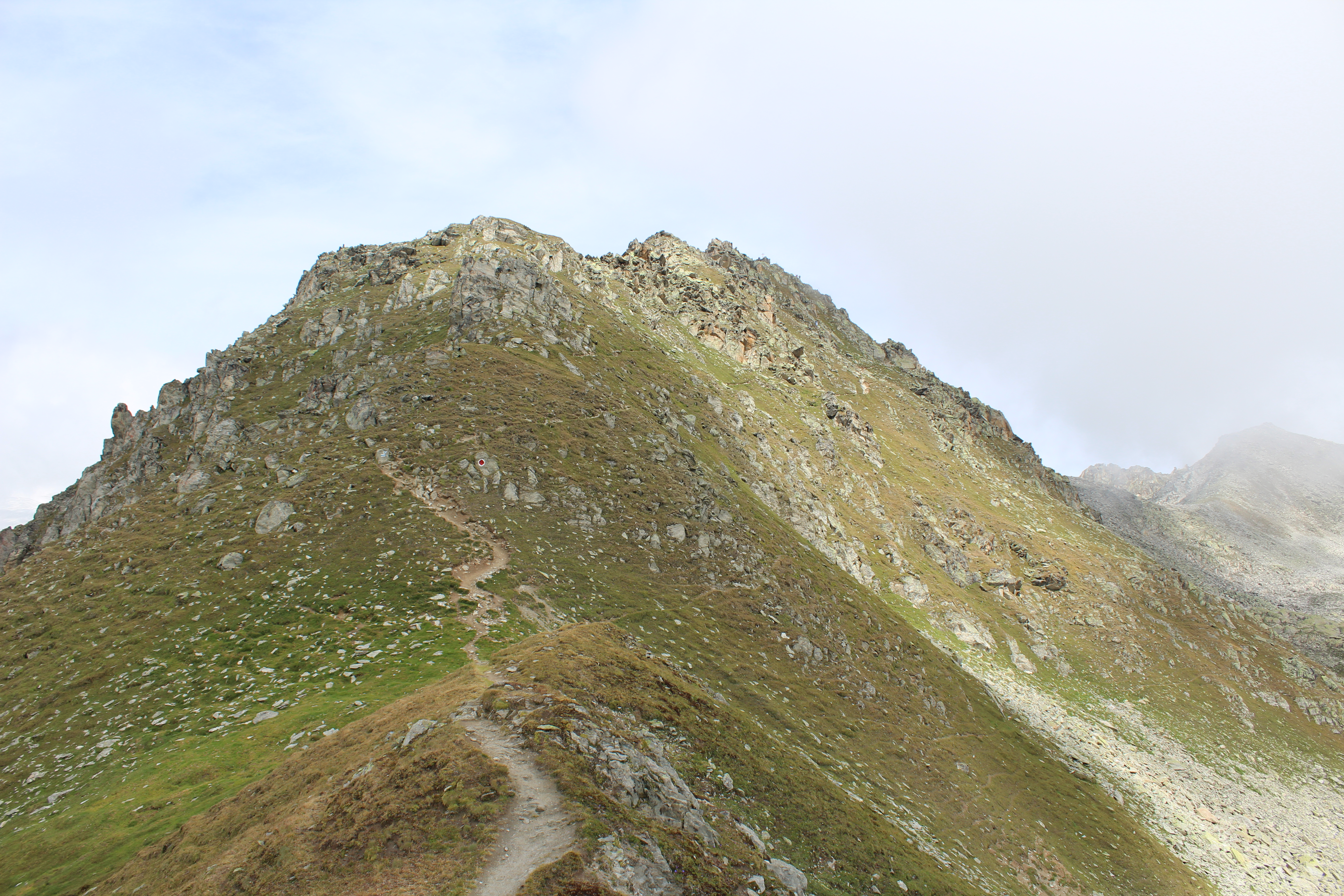
- From the walk to the peak of the Risihorn

Highest point
- Elevation: 2,875 m (9,432 ft)
- Prominence: 51 m (167 ft)
- Parent peak: Finsteraarhorn
- Coordinates: 46°27′46.7″N 8°9′15.4″E

Geography
- Location within Switzerland
- Location: Valais, Switzerland
- Parent range: Bernese Alps

The Risihorn is a mountain of the Bernese Alps, overlooking Bellwald in the canton of Valais. It lies south of the Setzehorn, at the southern end of the chain lying east of the Fiescher Glacier.
