= Gebidum =

Mountain in Switzerland

- Gibidum
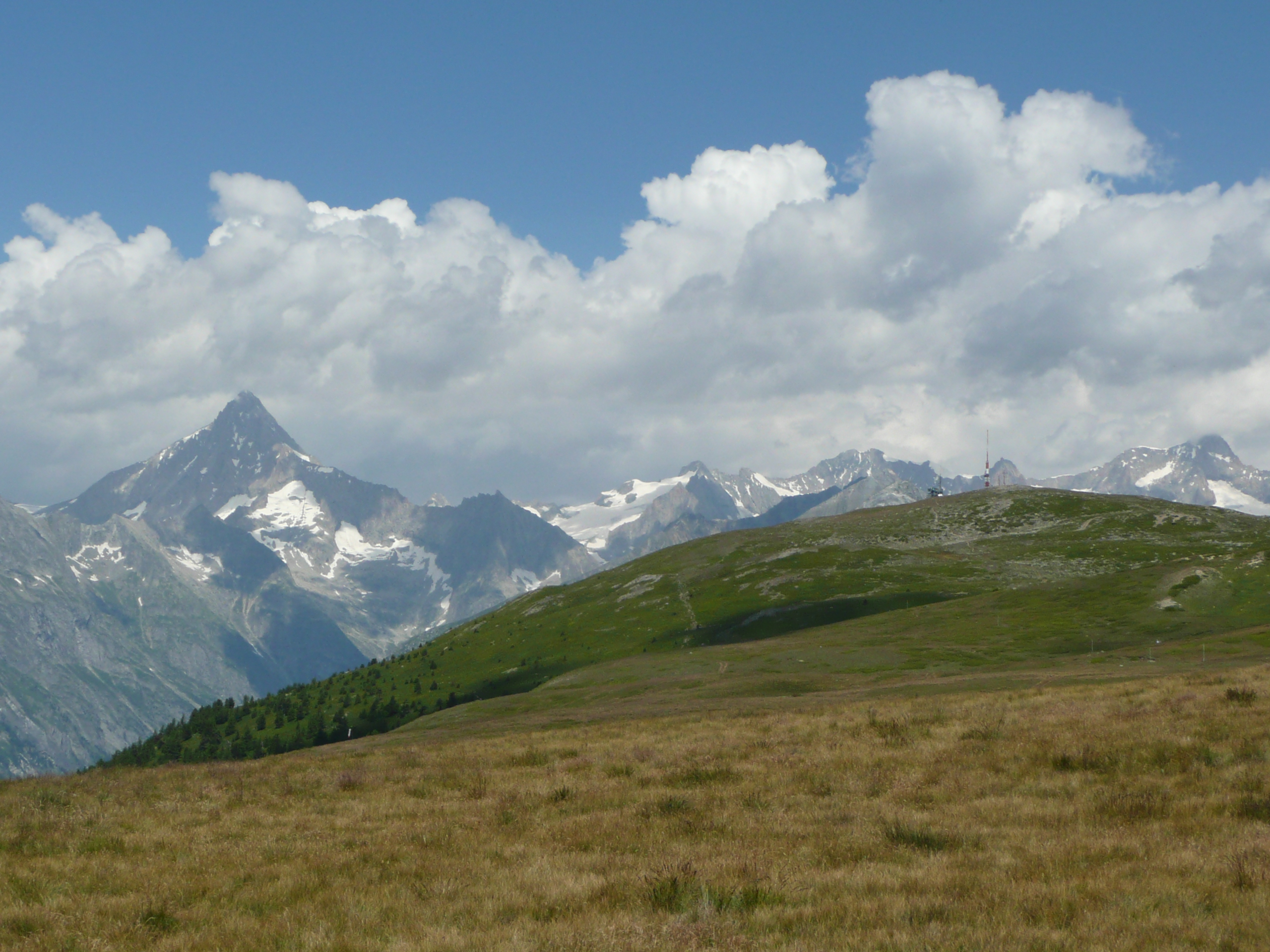
- The Gebidum with the Bernese Alps in background

Highest point
- Elevation: 2,317 m (7,602 ft)
- Prominence: 116 m (381 ft)
- Coordinates: 46°16′9.9″N 7°56′10.3″E

Geography
- Location within Switzerland
- Location: Valais, Switzerland
- Parent range: Pennine Alps

The Gebidum (also known as Gibidum) is a mountain of the Swiss Pennine Alps, overlooking Visperterminen in the canton of Valais. An antenna is located on the summit.
