= Tschingelspitz =

Mountain in Switzerland

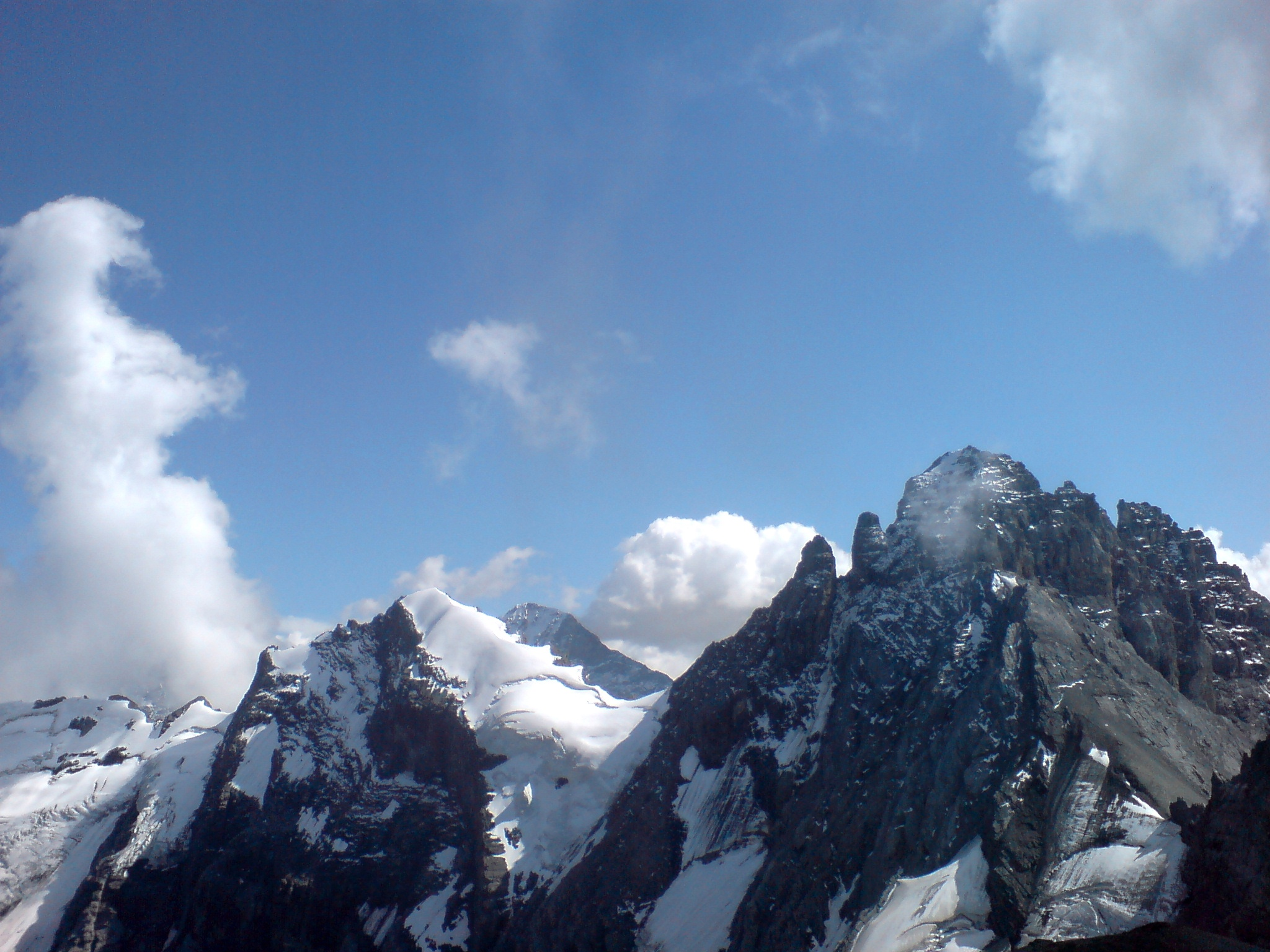
- The Tschingelspitz (left) and the Gspaltenhorn (right)

Highest point
- Elevation: 3,315 m (10,876 ft)
- Prominence: 190 m (620 ft)
- Parent peak: Gspaltenhorn
- Coordinates: 46°30′39.5″N 7°50′23.3″E

Geography
- Location within Switzerland
- Location: Bern, Switzerland
- Parent range: Bernese Alps

The Tschingelspitz is a mountain of the Bernese Alps, located south of Mürren in the Bernese Oberland. It lies east of the higher Gspaltenhorn.
