= Ewigschneehorn =

Mountain in Switzerland

- Location within Switzerland

Highest point
- Elevation: 3,330 m (10,930 ft)
- Prominence: 95 m (312 ft)
- Parent peak: Mittelhorn
- Coordinates: 46°35′50.3″N 8°10′7″E

Geography
- Location: Bern, Switzerland
- Parent range: Bernese Alps

The Ewigschneehorn is a mountain of the Bernese Alps, located between the valleys of the Unterar and Gauli Glacier, east of the Schreckhorn. It has an elevation of 3,330 metres above sea level. The mountain is entirely surrounded by glaciers.
