= Innerer Fisistock =

Mountain in Switzerland

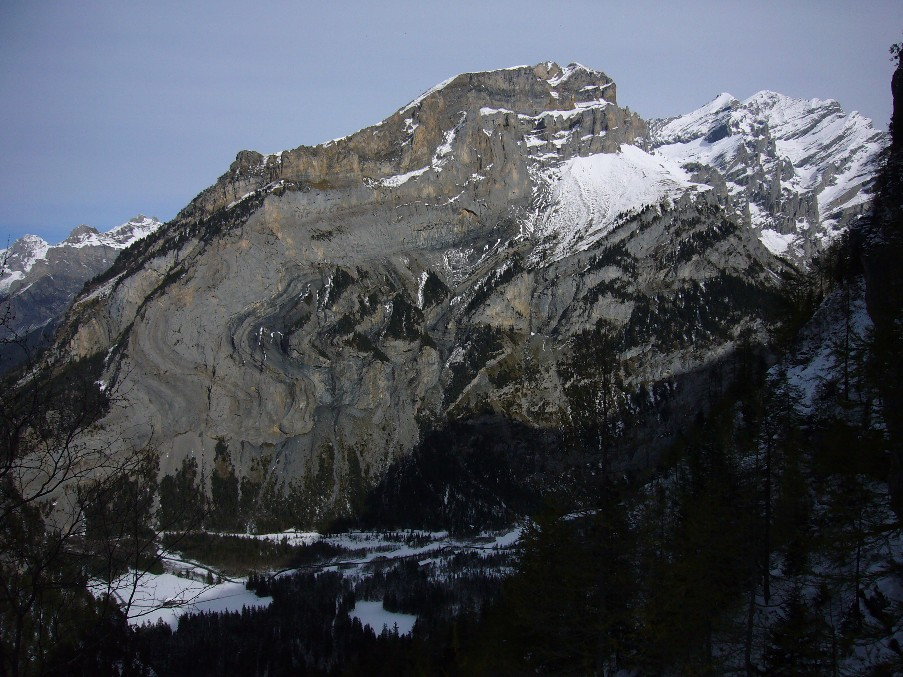
- The Innerer Fisistock and the Doldenhorn (right) from the south side

Highest point
- Elevation: 2,787 m (9,144 ft)
- Prominence: 111 m (364 ft)
- Coordinates: 46°28′10.4″N 7°41′26.5″E

Geography
- Location within Switzerland
- Location: Bern, Switzerland
- Parent range: Bernese Alps

The Innerer Fisistock is a mountain of the Bernese Alps, overlooking Kandersteg in the Bernese Oberland. It lies at the western end the Blüemlisalp chain.
