= Gärsthorn =

Mountain in Switzerland

- The Gärsthorn (in the foreground)

Highest point
- Elevation: 2,964 m (9,724 ft)
- Prominence: 208 m (682 ft)
- Coordinates: 46°20′48.5″N 7°54′59.5″E

Geography
- Location within Switzerland
- Location: Valais, Switzerland
- Parent range: Bernese Alps

The Gärsthorn is a mountain of the Bernese Alps, overlooking Mund in the canton of Valais. The main (north) summit has an elevation of 2,964 metres, while the southern summit has an elevation of 2,927 metres.
