= Ritzihorn =

Mountain in Switzerland

- Location within Switzerland

Highest point
- Elevation: 2,891 m (9,485 ft)
- Prominence: 53 m (174 ft)
- Parent peak: Finsteraarhorn
- Coordinates: 46°29′16.9″N 8°11′49.5″E

Geography
- Location: Valais, Switzerland
- Parent range: Bernese Alps

The Ritzihorn is a mountain of the Bernese Alps, overlooking Reckingen in the canton of Valais. It lies on the range south of the Galmihorn.
