= Schluchhorn =

Mountain in Switzerland

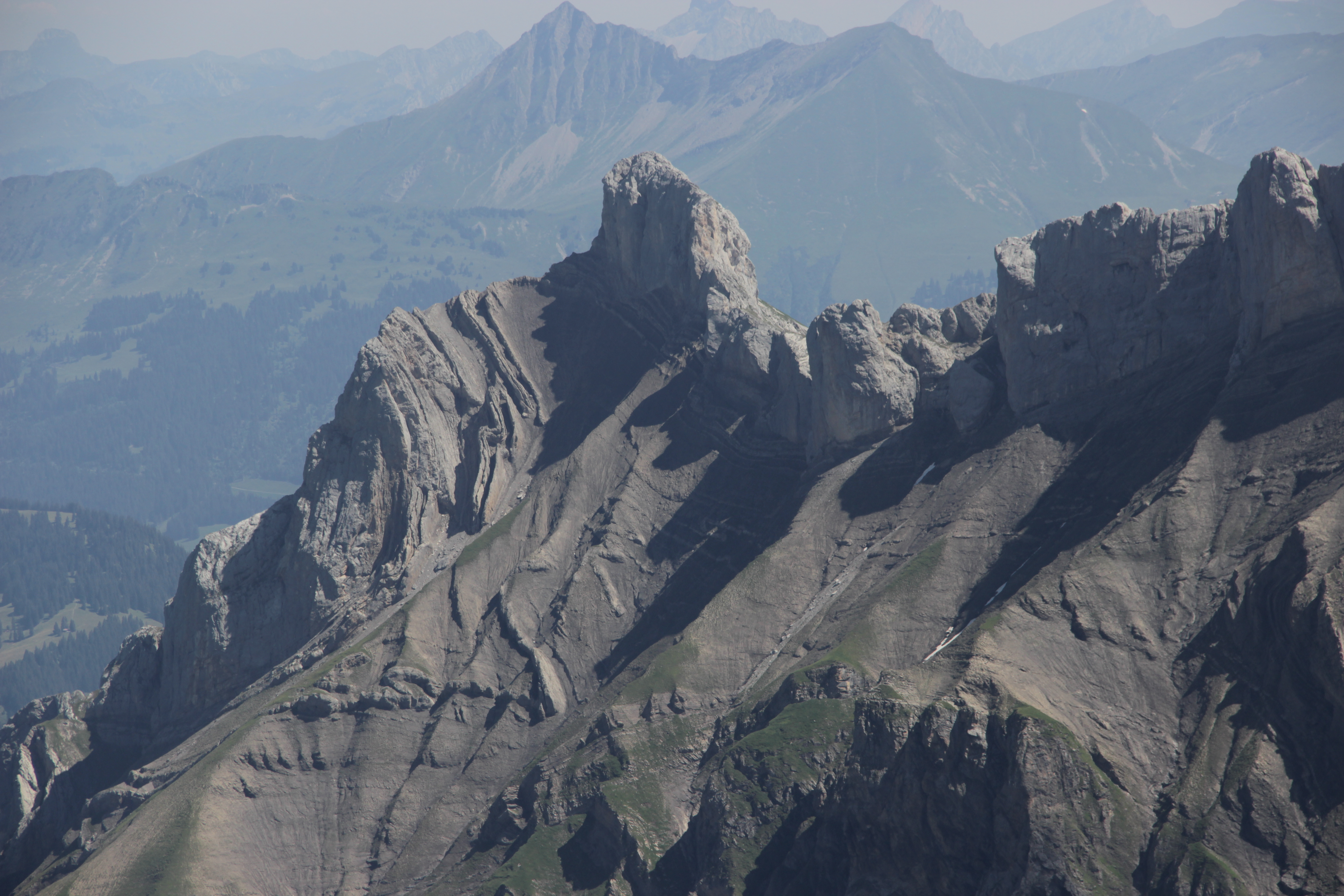

Highest point
- Elevation: 2,579 m (8,461 ft)
- Prominence: 73 m (240 ft)
- Parent peak: Diablerets
- Coordinates: 46°21′29.5″N 7°15′44.6″E

Geography
- Location within Switzerland
- Location: Bern/Valais, Switzerland
- Parent range: Bernese Alps

The Schluchhorn is a mountain in the Bernese Alps, overlooking Gsteig in the Bernese Oberland. The summit is located on the border between the cantons of Valais and Bern near the Sanetsch Pass.
