= Wysshorn =

Mountain in Switzerland

- Location within Switzerland

Highest point
- Elevation: 3,625 m (11,893 ft)
- Coordinates: 46°26′33.1″N 7°57′06.2″E

Geography
- Location: Switzerland
- Parent range: Bernese Alps

The Name Wysshorn stands for three subpeaks of the Schinhorn in the Bernese Alps, which are: Nördliches Wysshorn (3625 m); Mittleres Wysshorn (3545 m); Südliches Wysshorn (3482 m).
