= Mittaghorn (Rawilpass) =

Mountain in Switzerland

- Tachaigne
- Location within Switzerland

Highest point
- Elevation: 2,686 m (8,812 ft)
- Prominence: 114 m (374 ft)
- Parent peak: Wildhorn
- Coordinates: 46°23′10.2″N 07°26′19.5″E

Geography
- Location: Bern/Valais, Switzerland
- Parent range: Bernese Alps

The Mittaghorn (also known as Tachaigne) is a mountain of the Bernese Alps, overlooking the Rawil Pass on the border between the cantons of Bern and Valais. It is located east of the Wildhorn.
