= Furggenspitz =

Mountain in Switzerland

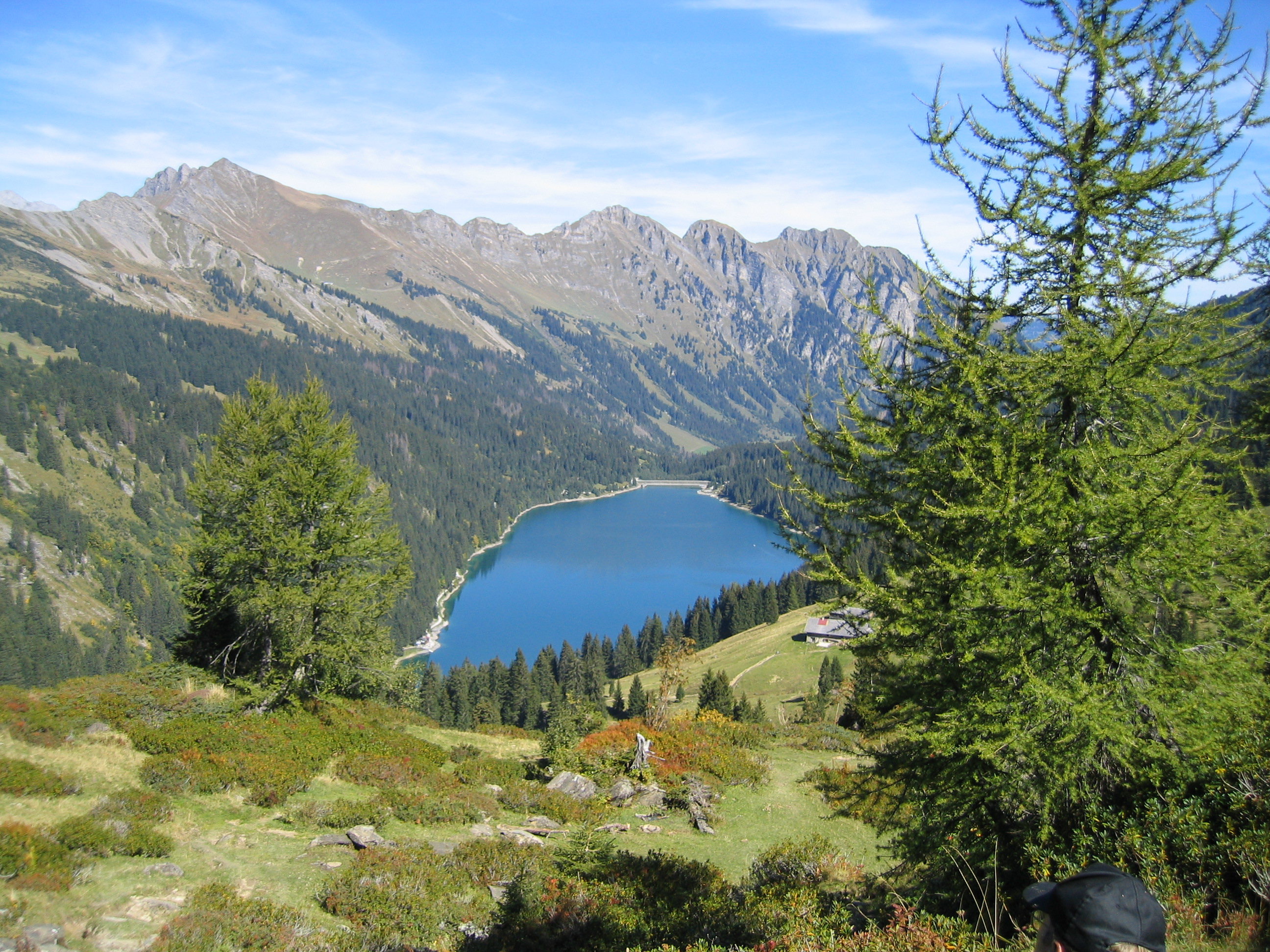
- The Furggenspitz (centre) with the Arnensee

Highest point
- Elevation: 2,297 m (7,536 ft)
- Prominence: 157 m (515 ft)
- Parent peak: Wittenberghorn
- Coordinates: 46°25′21.3″N 7°13′48.4″E

Geography
- Location within Switzerland
- Location: Bern, Switzerland
- Parent range: Bernese Alps

The Furggenspitz is a mountain in the Bernese Alps, overlooking Feutersoey in the Bernese Oberland.
