= Olmenhorn =

Mountain in Switzerland

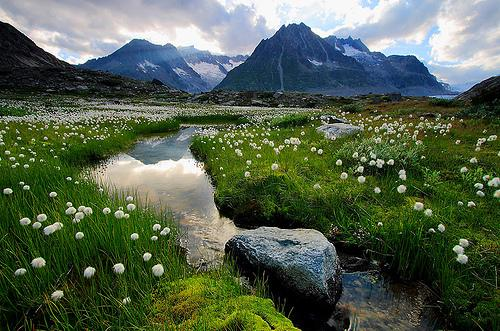
- Olmenhorn (centre right) seen from Märjelensee

Highest point
- Elevation: 3,314 m (10,873 ft)
- Prominence: 100 m (330 ft)
- Parent peak: Aletschhorn
- Coordinates: 46°27′13.4″N 8°3′8.2″E

Geography
- Location within Switzerland
- Location: Valais, Switzerland
- Parent range: Bernese Alps

The Olmenhorn is a mountain of the Bernese Alps, overlooking the Aletsch Glacier in the canton of Valais.
