= Grosses Engelhorn =

Mountain of the Bernese Alps

- Location within Switzerland

Highest point
- Elevation: 2,782 m (9,127 ft)
- Prominence: 92 m (302 ft)
- Parent peak: Gstellihorn
- Coordinates: 46°40′19.7″N 8°10′48″E

Geography
- Location: Bern, Switzerland
- Parent range: Bernese Alps

The Grosses Engelhorn is a mountain of the Bernese Alps, located west of Innertkirchen in the Bernese Oberland. It is one of the highest summits of the Engelhörner, the chain between the Reichenbachtal and the Urbachtal.
