= Altels =

Mountain in Switzerland

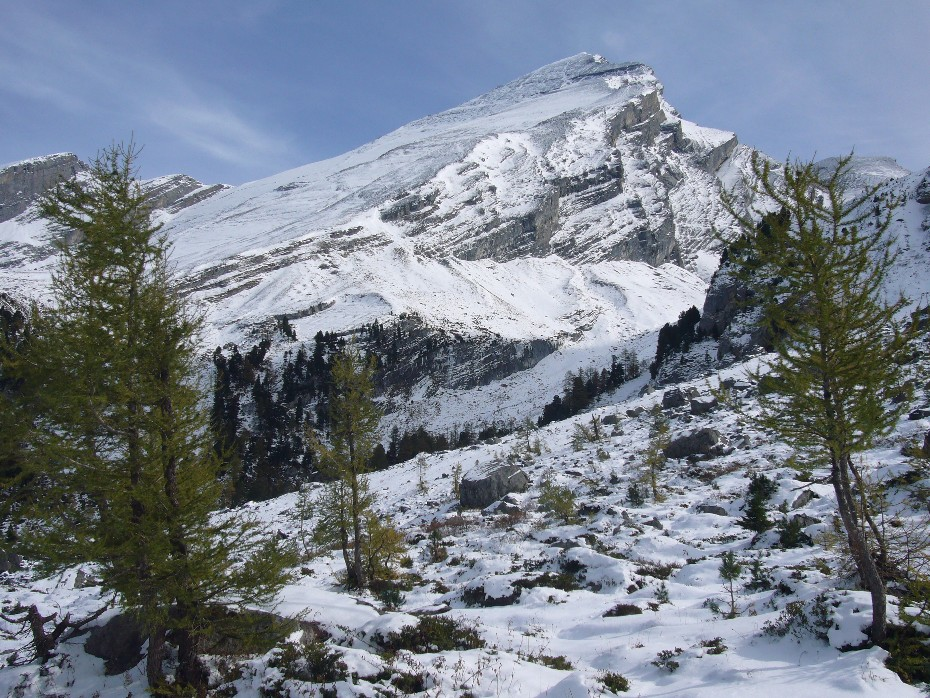
- Western face of the Altels

Highest point
- Elevation: 3,630 m (11,910 ft)
- Prominence: 100 m (330 ft)
- Parent peak: Balmhorn
- Coordinates: 46°25′43.72″N 07°40′42″E

Geography
- Location within Switzerland
- Location: Bern/Valais Switzerland
- Parent range: Bernese Alps

The Altels (3,630 m) is a mountain of the Bernese Alps, located on the border between the Swiss cantons of Bern and Valais. It is situated in the Balmhorn massif, approximately halfway between Kandersteg and Leukerbad.

Although its south side is in Valais, the mountain lies within the Aar basin.

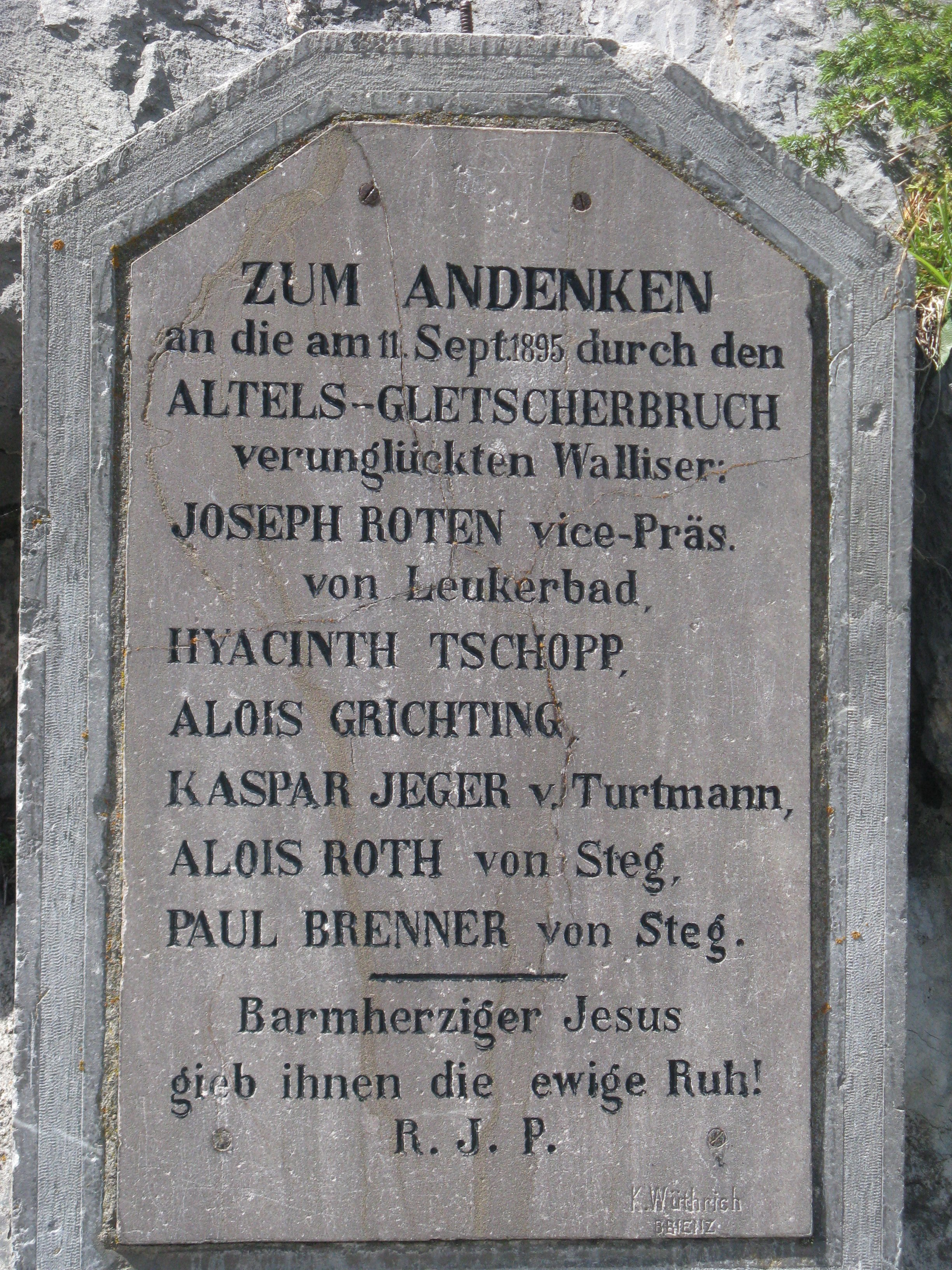
Altels memorial

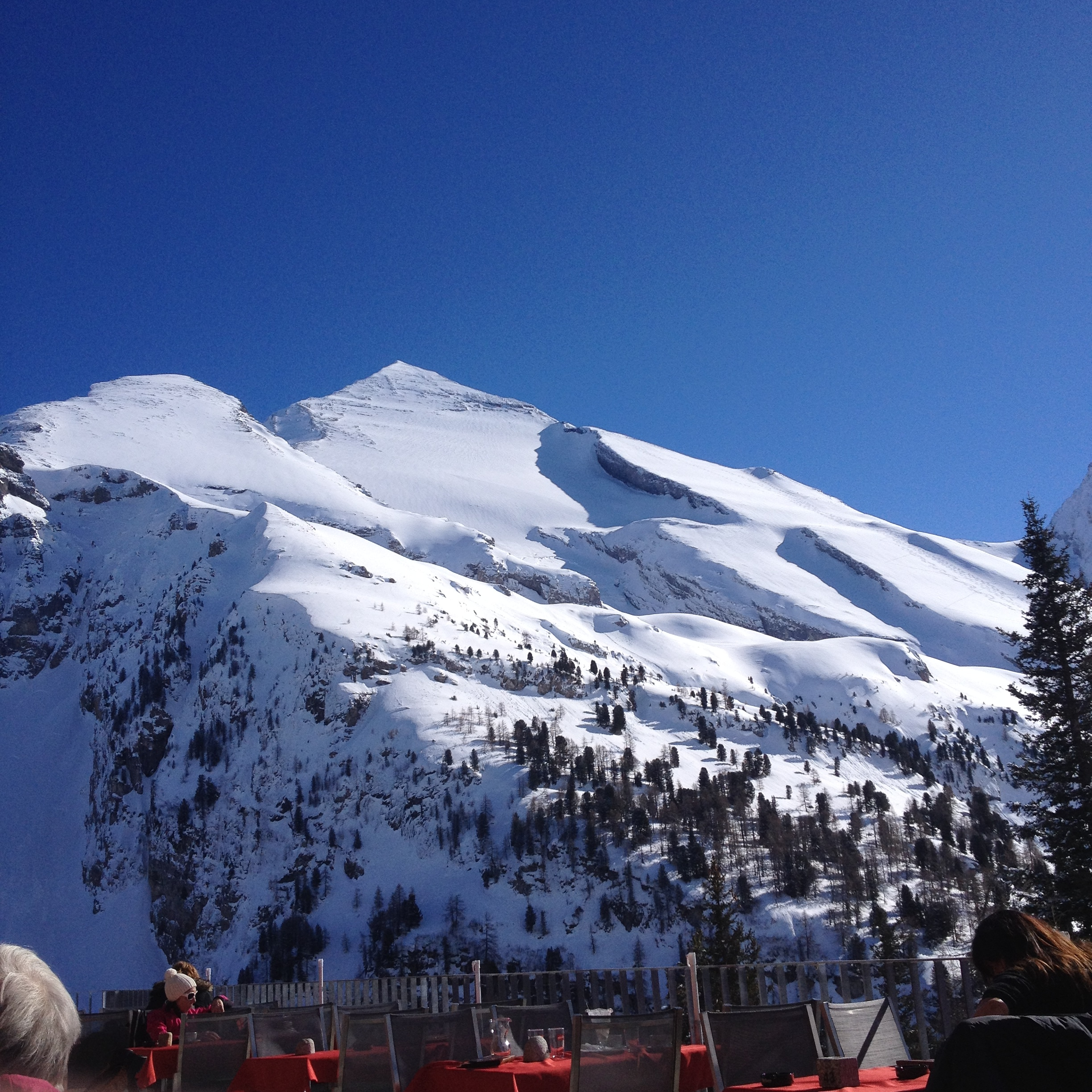
Seen from the Sunbüel
