= Bunderspitz =

Mountain in Switzerland

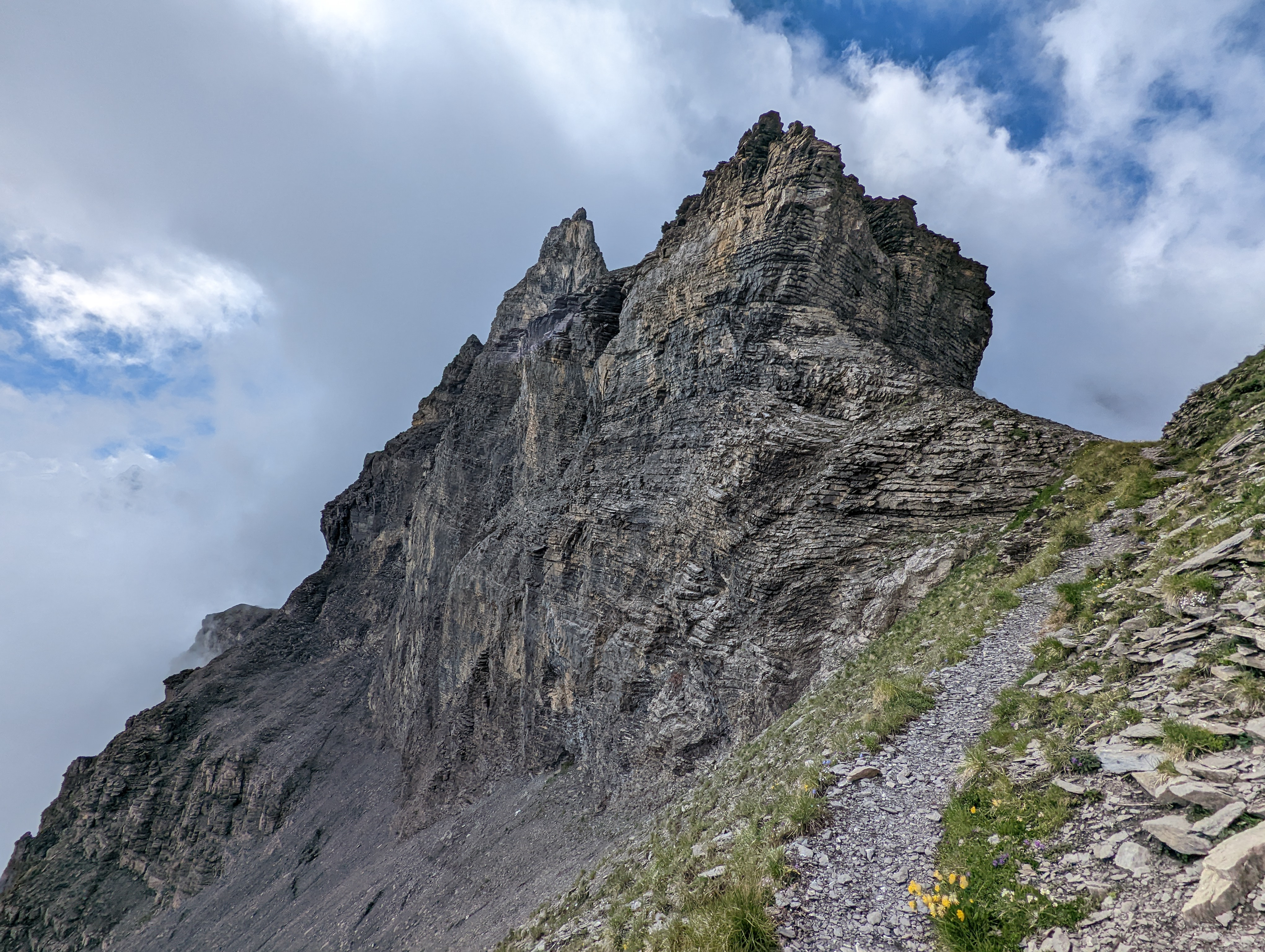

Highest point
- Elevation: 2,546 m (8,353 ft)
- Prominence: 98 m (322 ft)
- Parent peak: First
- Coordinates: 46°29′32.8″N 7°37′13.2″E

Geography
- Location within Switzerland
- Location: Bern, Switzerland
- Parent range: Bernese Alps

The Bunderspitz is a mountain of the Bernese Alps, located between Adelboden and Kandersteg in the canton of Bern.

The summit can be reached by a trail from both sides.
