= Hochmatt =

Mountain in Switzerland

- Location within Switzerland

Highest point
- Elevation: 2,152 m (7,060 ft)
- Prominence: 428 m (1,404 ft)
- Parent peak: Dent de Savigny
- Coordinates: 46°34′33″N 7°13′12.4″E

Geography
- Location: Fribourg, Switzerland
- Parent range: Fribogese Alps

The Hochmatt is a mountain of the Bernese Alps, located south of Jaun in the canton of Fribourg. It lies west of the Gastlosen chain.
