= Brünberg =

Mountain in Switzerland

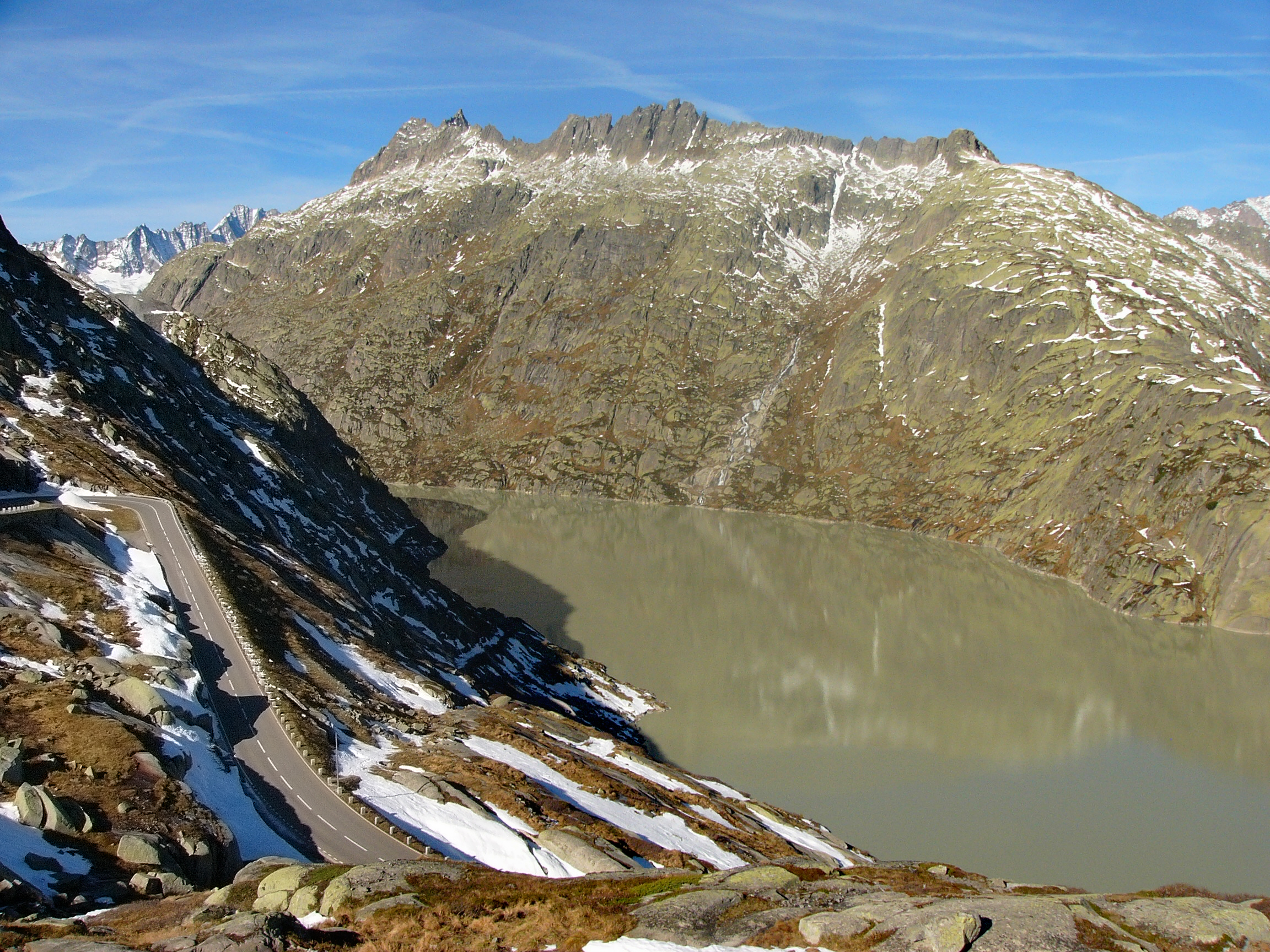
- The south side

Highest point
- Elevation: 2,982 m (9,783 ft)
- Prominence: 170 m (560 ft)
- Parent peak: Finsteraarhorn
- Coordinates: 46°34′35.9″N 8°16′51.6″E

Geography
- Location within Switzerland
- Location: Bern, Switzerland
- Parent range: Bernese Alps

The Brünberg is a mountain of the Bernese Alps, overlooking the Grimselsee in the canton of Bern. It is composed of several summits, of which the highest has an elevation of 2,982 metres above sea level.
