= Klein Wellhorn =

Mountain in Switzerland

- Location within Switzerland

Highest point
- Elevation: 2,701 m (8,862 ft)
- Prominence: 77 m (253 ft)
- Coordinates: 46°39′57.2″N 8°09′03.7″E

Geography
- Location: Bern, Switzerland
- Parent range: Bernese Alps

The Klein Wellhorn (also spelled Kleines Wellhorn) is a mountain in the Bernese Alps, overlooking Rosenlaui in the Bernese Oberland. It lies north of the Wellhorn.
