= Tieregghorn =

Mountain in Switzerland

- Location within Switzerland

Highest point
- Elevation: 3,072 m (10,079 ft)
- Prominence: 85 m (279 ft)
- Parent peak: Finsteraarhorn
- Coordinates: 46°22′23.3″N 7°51′33.9″E

Geography
- Location: Valais, Switzerland
- Parent range: Bernese Alps

The Tieregghorn is a mountain of the Bernese Alps, located north of Ausserberg in the canton of Valais. It lies south of the Bietschhorn, on the range separating the Bietschtal from the Baltschiedertal.
