= Brandlammhorn =

Mountain in Switzerland

- Location within Switzerland

Highest point
- Elevation: 3,108 m (10,197 ft)
- Prominence: 113 m (371 ft)
- Parent peak: Finsteraarhorn
- Coordinates: 46°34′53.5″N 8°15′27.5″E

Geography
- Location: Bern, Switzerland
- Parent range: Bernese Alps

The Brandlammhorn (3,108 m) is a mountain of the Bernese Alps, overlooking the Unteraar Glacier and Lake Grimsel in the canton of Bern. It lies on the range east of the Bächlistock, which separates the Bächlital from the Unteraar valley.
