= Alplistock =

Mountain in Switzerland

- Location within Switzerland

Highest point
- Elevation: 2,878 m (9,442 ft)
- Prominence: 141 m (463 ft)
- Parent peak: Finsteraarhorn
- Coordinates: 46°35′40.5″N 8°16′57.4″E

Geography
- Location: Bern, Switzerland
- Parent range: Bernese Alps

The Alplistock is a mountain of the Bernese Alps, located west of Handegg in the Bernese Oberland. It lies east of the Diamantstock, on the range between the valley of the Grueben Glacier and the Bächlital.
