= Setzehorn =

Mountain in Switzerland

- Location within Switzerland

Highest point
- Elevation: 3,061 m (10,043 ft)
- Prominence: 44 m (144 ft)
- Parent peak: Finsteraarhorn
- Coordinates: 46°28′34″N 8°9′39.7″E

Geography
- Location: Valais, Switzerland
- Parent range: Bernese Alps

The Setzehorn is a mountain of the Bernese Alps, located north of Bellwald in the canton of Valais. It lies south of the Galmihorn, on the range lying between the Fiescher Glacier and the main Rhone valley.
