= Lauteraar Rothörner =

Mountain in Switzerland

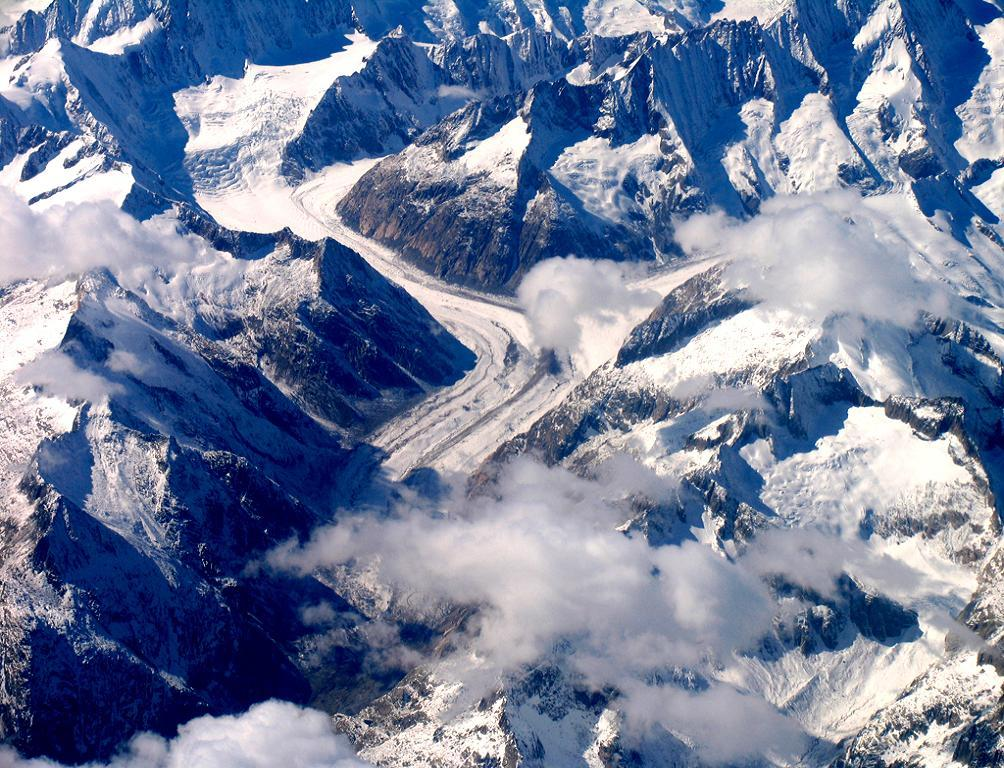
- The Lauteraar Rotörner and the Oberaletsch Glacier (click on image to see annotations)

Highest point
- Elevation: 3,477 m (11,407 ft)
- Prominence: 79 m (259 ft)
- Parent peak: Hugihorn
- Coordinates: 46°34′02″N 8°09′12″E

Geography
- Location within Switzerland
- Location: Bern, Switzerland
- Parent range: Bernese Alps

Climbing
- Easiest route: rock/snow climb

The Lauteraar Rothörner are a multi-summited mountain of the Bernese Alps, overlooking the Unteraar Glacier in the canton of Bern. They lie one kilometre south-east of the Hugihorn, on the range separating the Strahlegg Glacier from the Lauteraar Glacier, both tributaries of the Unteraar Glacier.
