= Vanil Carré =

Mountain in Switzerland

- Pra de Cray
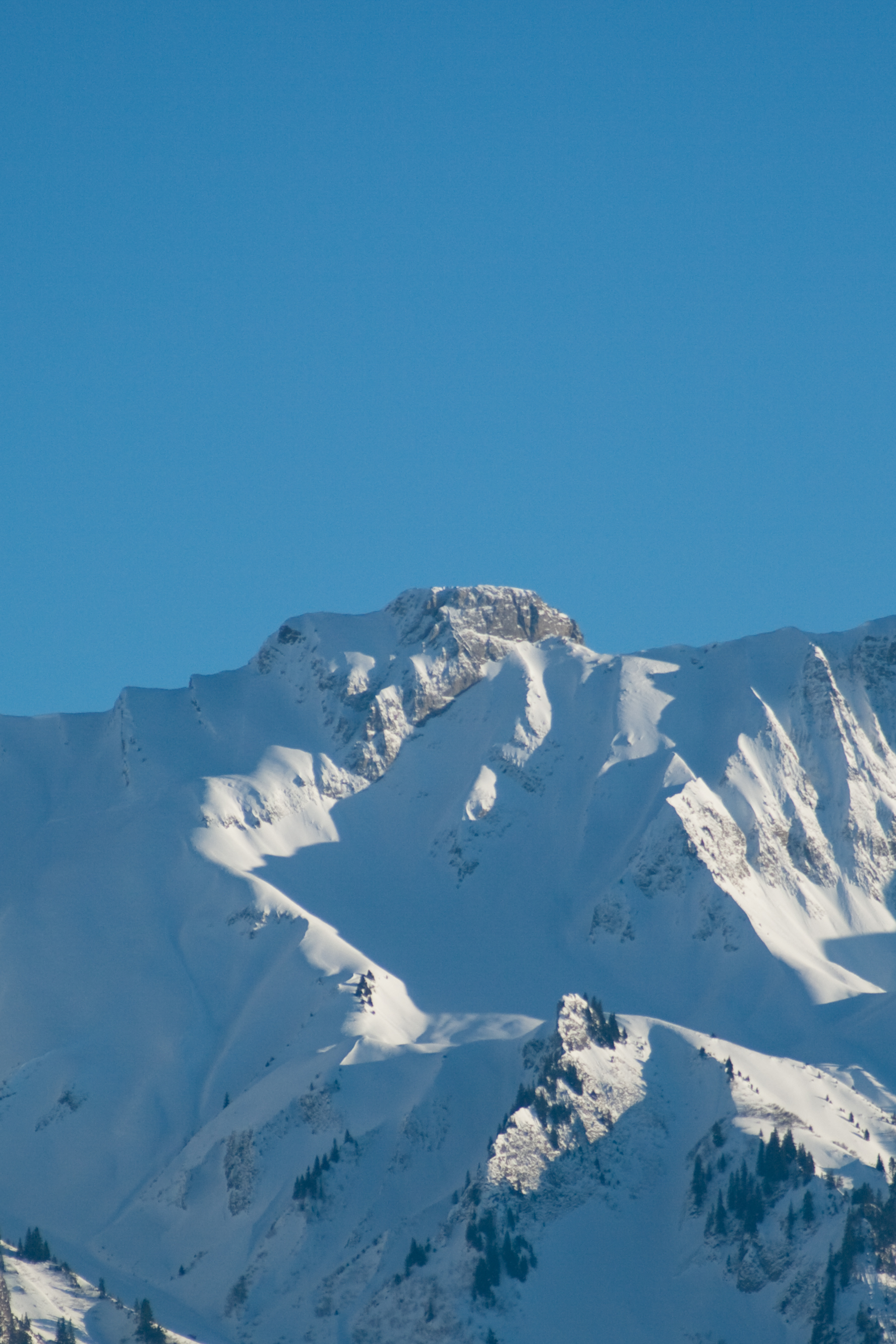

Highest point
- Elevation: 2,195 m (7,201 ft)
- Prominence: 40 m (130 ft)
- Parent peak: Pra de Cray
- Coordinates: 46°29′49″N 7°7′6″E

Geography
- Location within Switzerland
- Location: Switzerland
- Parent range: Bernese Alps

The Vanil Carré (French pronunciation: [vanil kaʁe]) is a mountain in the western Bernese Alps, located on the border between the cantons of Fribourg and Vaud. It lies on the massif separating the valleys of Gruyère and Pays d'Enhaut, which culminates at the Vanil Noir.
