= Rüdigenspitze =

Mountain in Switzerland

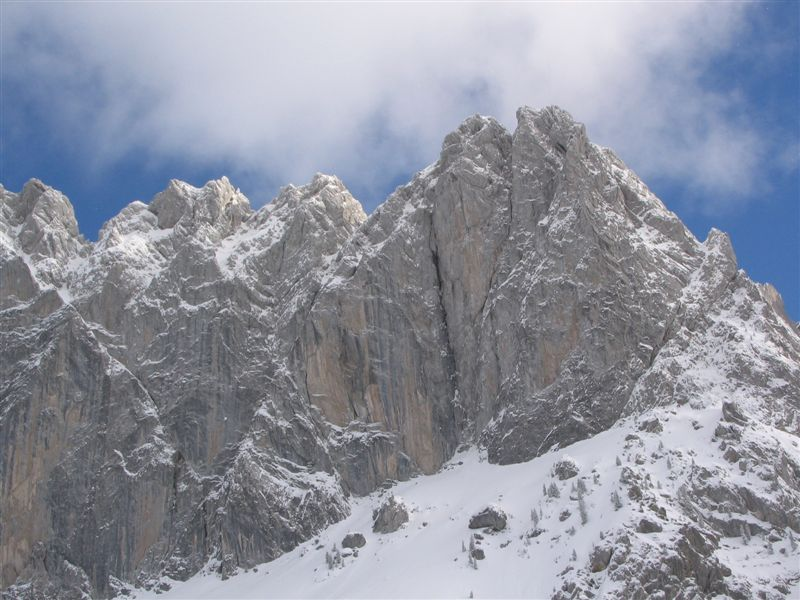

Highest point
- Elevation: 2,124 m (6,969 ft)
- Prominence: 203 m (666 ft)
- Parent peak: Dent de Savigny
- Coordinates: 46°34′24″N 7°16′05″E

Geography
- Location within Switzerland
- Location: Fribourg/Bern, Switzerland
- Parent range: Bernese Alps

The Rüdigenspitze is a mountain of the Gastlosen, located on the border between the Swiss cantons of Fribourg and Bern. It lies south of Jaun.
