= Firehorn =

Mountain in Switzerland

- Location within Switzerland

Highest point
- Elevation: 3,182 m (10,440 ft)
- Prominence: 123 m (404 ft)
- Parent peak: Finsteraarhorn
- Coordinates: 46°30′23″N 8°12′13″E

Geography
- Location: Valais, Switzerland
- Parent range: Bernese Alps

The Firehorn is a mountain of the Bernese Alps, located north of Reckingen in the canton of Valais. It lies south of the Oberaarrothorn, between the Minstigergletscher and the Bächigletscher.
