= Schwarzhorn (Wildstrubel massif) =

Mountain in Switzerland

- Location within Switzerland

Highest point
- Elevation: 3,105 m (10,187 ft)
- Prominence: 102 m (335 ft)
- Parent peak: Schneehore
- Coordinates: 46°23′3.3″N 7°34′48.3″E

Geography
- Location: Valais, Switzerland
- Parent range: Bernese Alpsamb

The Schwarzhorn is a mountain of the Bernese Alps, located west of Leukerbad in the canton of Valais. It lies approximately halfway between the Wildstrubel and the Gemmi Pass.

Politically, the Schwarzhorn belongs to the municipalities of Leukerbad, Inden and Crans-Montana.
