= Lonzahörner =

Mountain in Switzerland

- Location within Switzerland

Highest point
- Elevation: 3,560 m (11,680 ft)
- Prominence: 58 m (190 ft)
- Parent peak: Breithorn (Blatten)
- Coordinates: 46°25′25.8″N 7°54′14.9″E

Geography
- Location: Valais, Switzerland
- Parent range: Bernese Alps

The Lonzahörner (3,560 m) are a multi-summited mountain of the Bernese Alps, located east of Blatten in the canton of Valais. They lie east of the Breithorn (Blatten), on the range between the Lötschental and the Oberaletsch Glacier.
