= Rauflihorn =

Mountain in Switzerland

- Blutlighorn
- Location within Switzerland

Highest point
- Elevation: 2,323 m (7,621 ft)
- Prominence: 144 m (472 ft)
- Parent peak: Albristhorn
- Coordinates: 46°31′58.2″N 7°28′57.1″E

Geography
- Location: Bern, Switzerland
- Parent range: Bernese Alps

The Rauflihorn (also known as Blutlighorn) is a mountain of the Bernese Alps, located east of St. Stephan in the Bernese Oberland, Switzerland.

== Borders ==
It lies east of the Spillgerte, on the range that separates the valley of Diemtigen from the Simmental.
