= Niwen =

Mountain in Switzerland

- Einigs Alichji
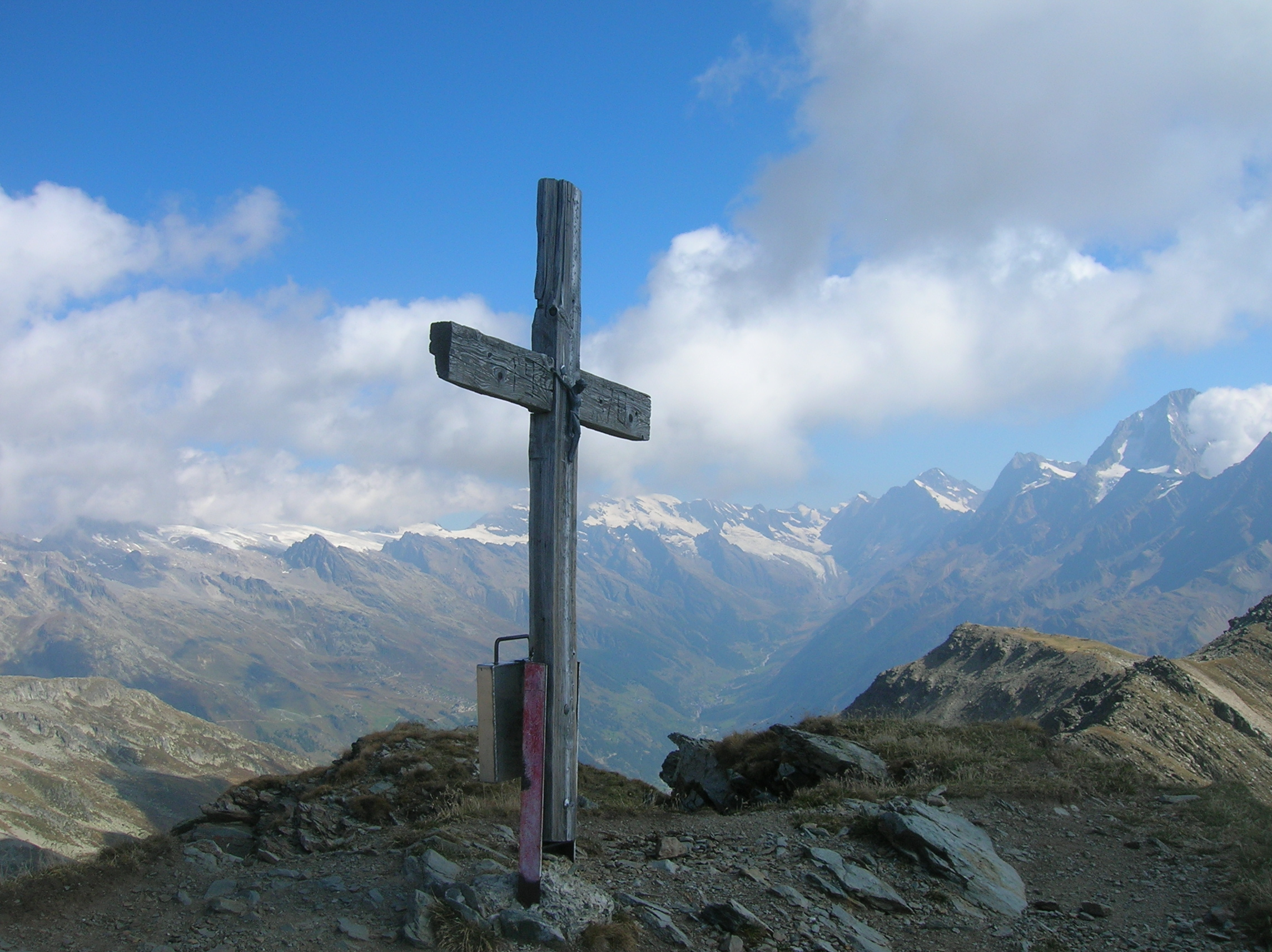
- Summit cross

Highest point
- Elevation: 2,769 m (9,085 ft)
- Prominence: 167 m (548 ft)
- Coordinates: 46°21′40.1″N 7°42′45.5″E

Geography
- Location within Switzerland
- Location: Valais, Switzerland
- Parent range: Bernese Alps

The Niwen (also known as Einigs Alichji) is a mountain of the Bernese Alps, overlooking the Rhone in the upper canton of Valais. It lies in the massif that separates the valley of Leukerbad from the lower Lötschental and that culminates at the Ferdenrothorn.
