= Schwarzmönch =

Mountain of the Bernese Alps

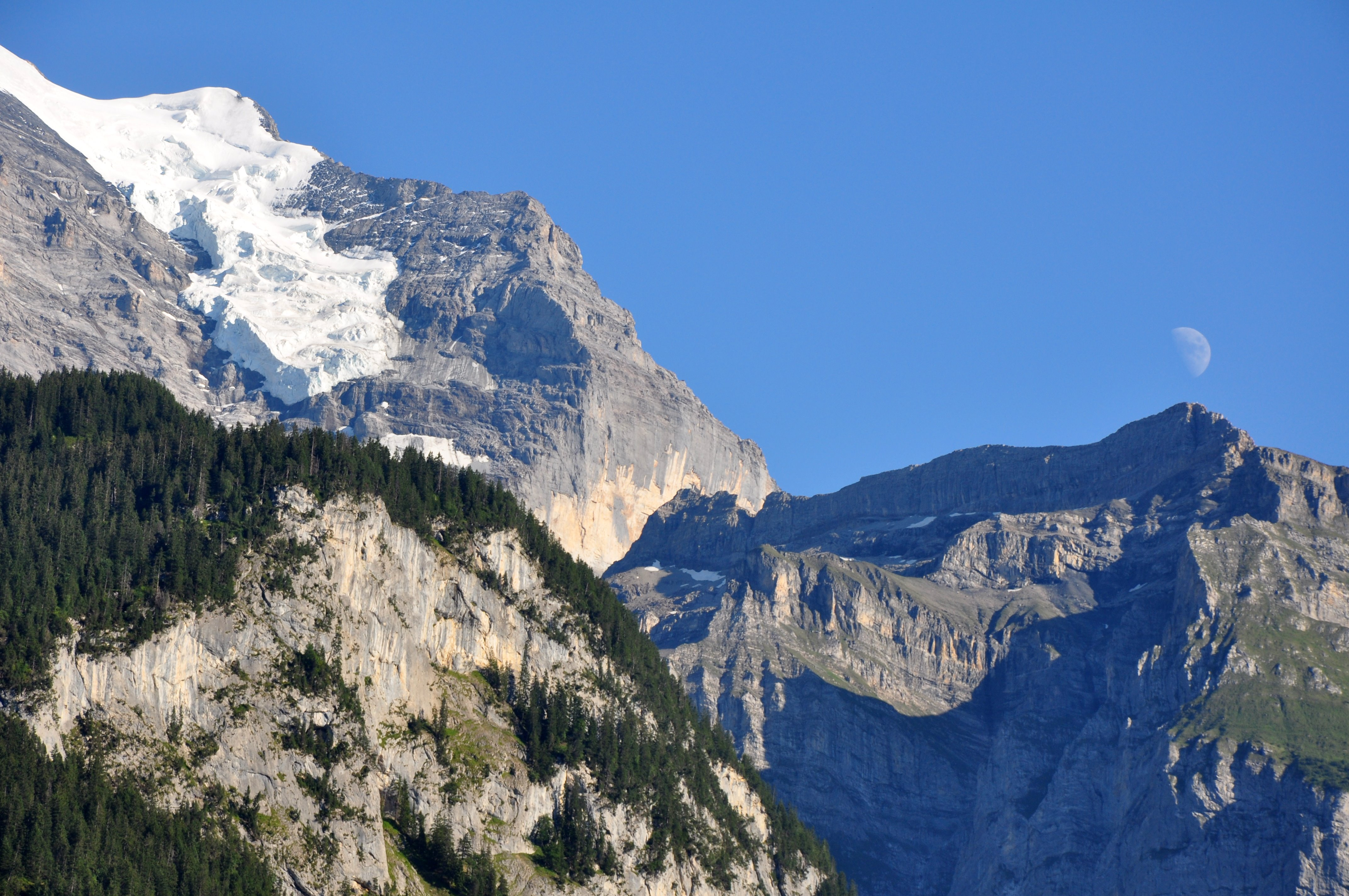
- The Schwarzmönch (right) and the Jungfrau (left)

Highest point
- Elevation: 2,649 m (8,691 ft)
- Coordinates: 46°33′6.2″N 7°55′35.8″E

Geography
- Location within Switzerland
- Location: Bern, Switzerland
- Parent range: Bernese Alps

The Schwarzmönch (German for "black monk") (2,649 m) is a mountain of the Bernese Alps, overlooking Lauterbrunnen in the Bernese Oberland. It forms a huge buttress on the north-west side of the Jungfrau, to which it is connected by the ridge named Ufem Schwarzen Grat.

East the summit is located the Silberhorn Hut.
