= Wiriehorn =

Mountain in Switzerland

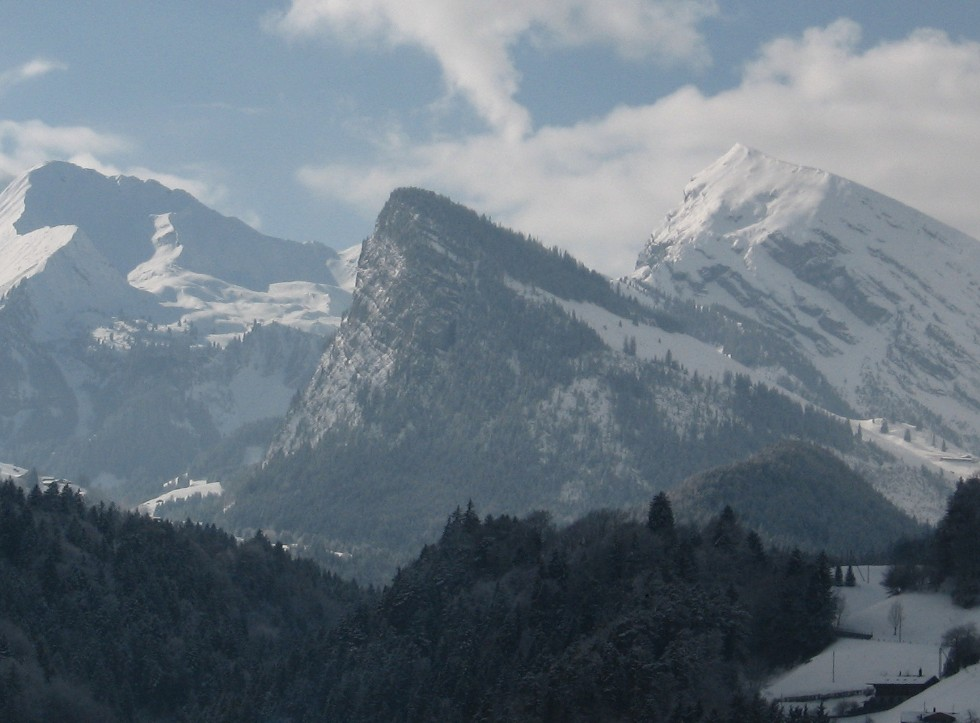
- Cheibehorn (left), Schwarzeberg (centre) and Wiriehorn (right) from the north side

Highest point
- Elevation: 2,304 m (7,559 ft)
- Prominence: 273 m (896 ft)
- Parent peak: Albristhorn
- Coordinates: 46°34′49″N 7°31′47″E

Geography
- Location within Switzerland
- Location: Bern, Switzerland
- Parent range: Bernese Alps

The Wiriehorn is a mountain of the Bernese Alps, located south of Zwischenflüh in the Bernese Oberland, Switzerland.
