= Mont à Cavouère =

Mountain in Switzerland

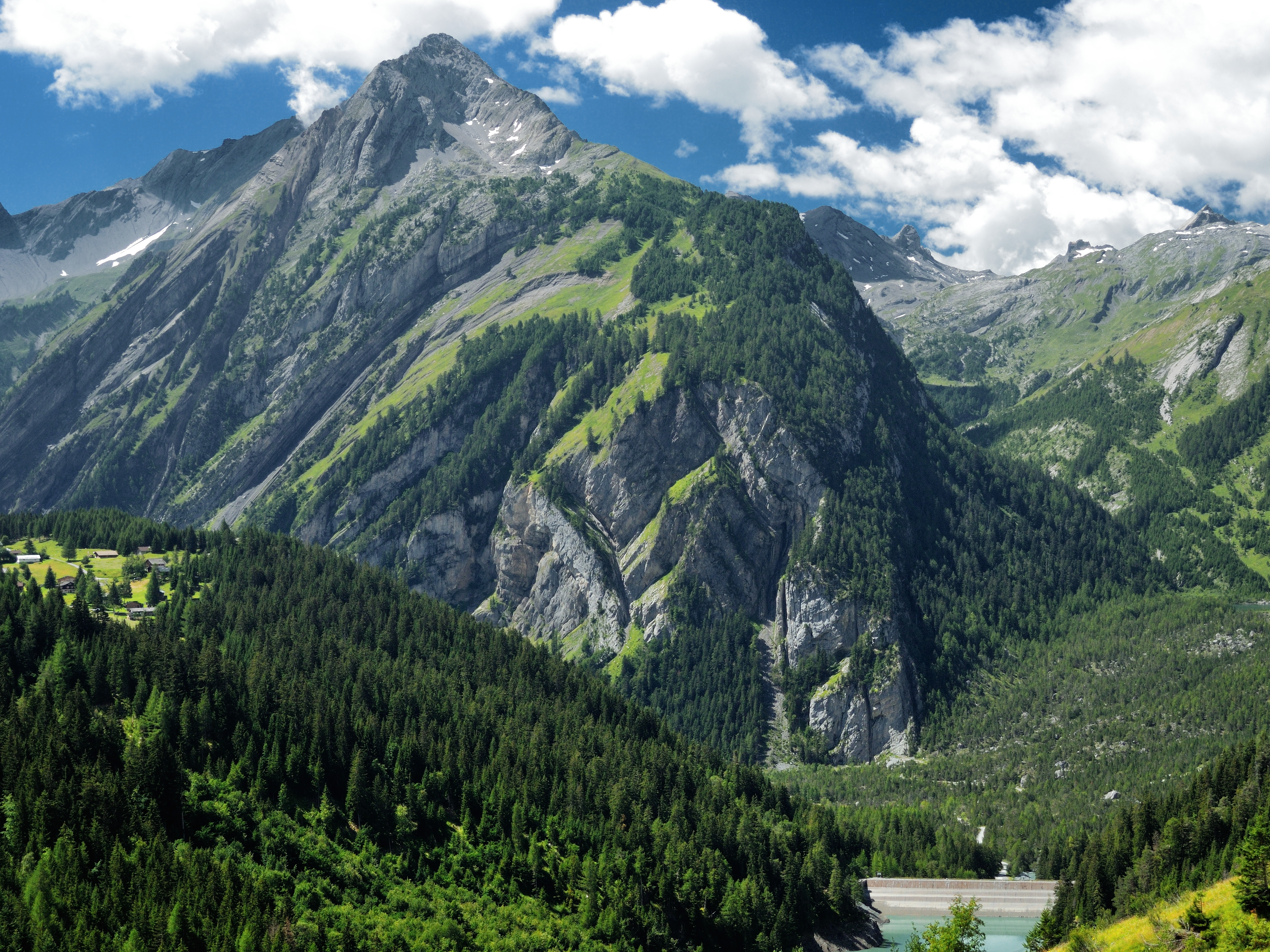
- North-east side

Highest point
- Elevation: 2,612 m (8,570 ft)
- Prominence: 122 m (400 ft)
- Parent peak: Haut de Cry
- Listing: Mountains of Switzerland
- Coordinates: 46°15′35″N 7°12′57.5″E

Geography
- Location within Switzerland
- Location: Valais, Switzerland
- Parent range: Bernese Alps

Mont à Cavouère is a mountain of the western Bernese Alps, located near Derborence in the canton of Valais. It lies north of the Haut de Cry.
