= Klein Grünhorn =

Mountain in Switzerland

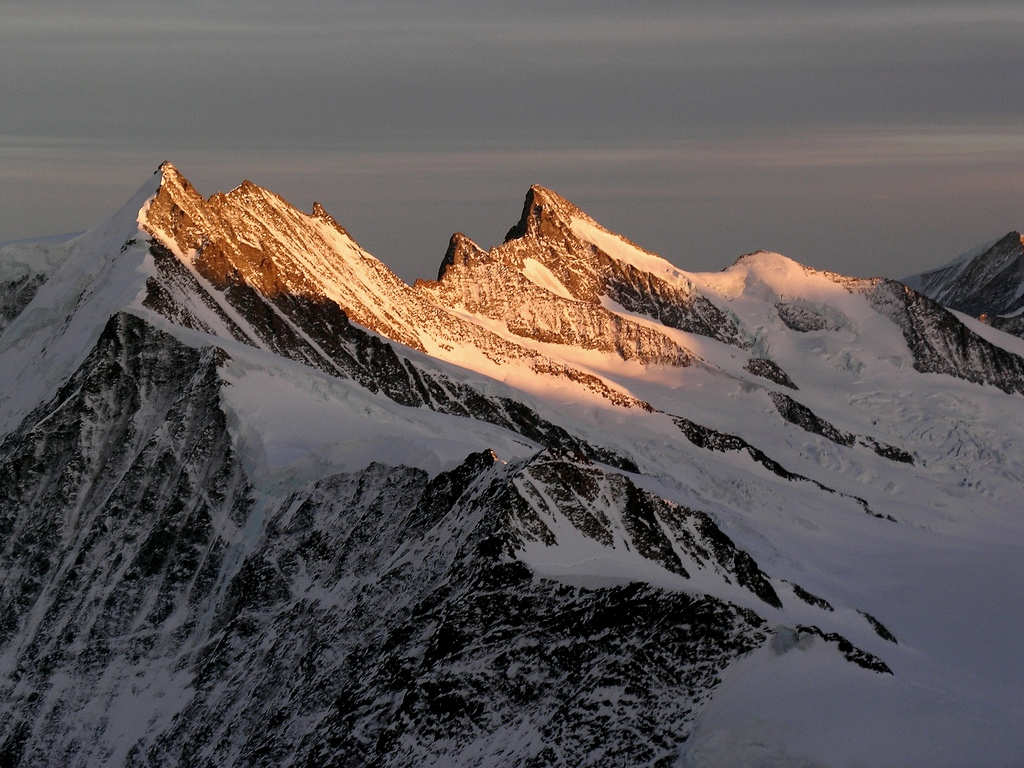
- Klein Grünhorn (centre) and Gross Grünhorn on its right. The Gross Fiescherhorn is on the left.

Highest point
- Elevation: 3,912 m (12,835 ft)
- Prominence: 60 m (200 ft)
- Parent peak: Gross Grünhorn
- Coordinates: 46°32′11.5″N 8°4′26.1″E

Geography
- Location within Switzerland
- Location: Valais, Switzerland
- Parent range: Bernese Alps

The Klein Grünhorn is a mountain of the Bernese Alps in Switzerland, situated north of the Gross Grünhorn in the canton of Valais.
