= Tschingellochtighorn =

Mountain in Switzerland

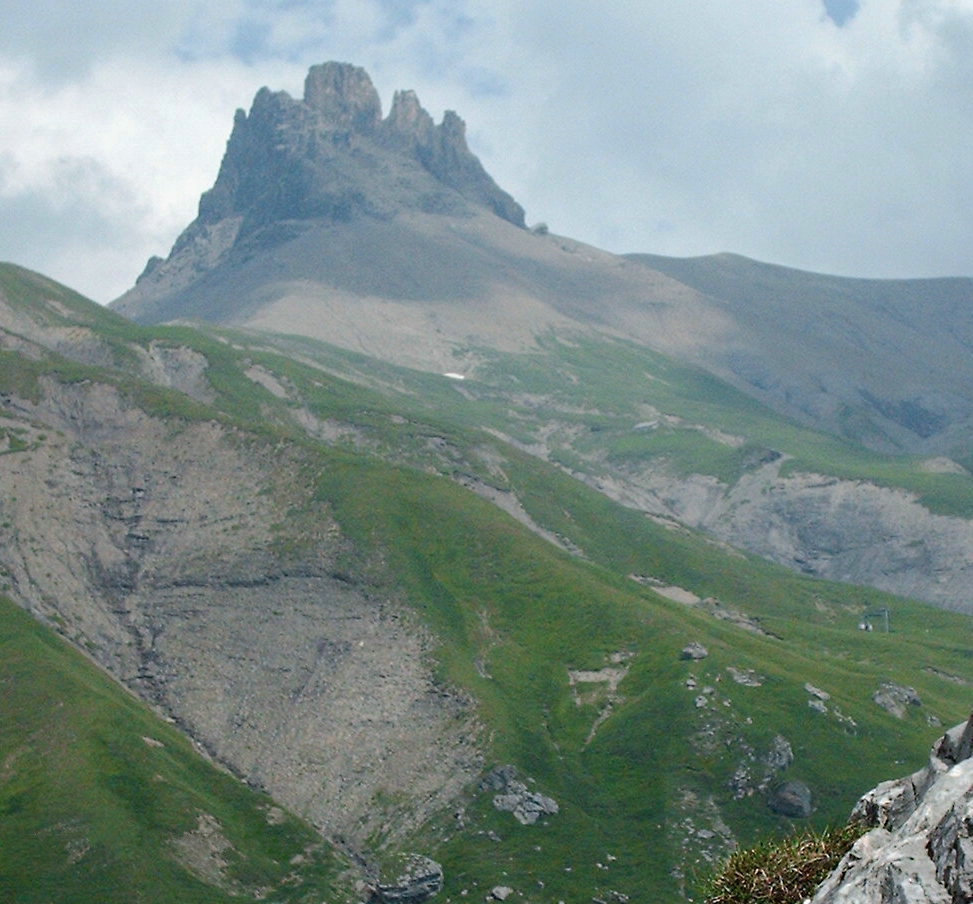

Highest point
- Elevation: 2,735 m (8,973 ft)
- Prominence: 135 m (443 ft)
- Parent peak: Wildstrubel
- Coordinates: 46°26′43.4″N 7°35′35.1″E

Geography
- Location within Switzerland
- Location: Bern, Switzerland
- Parent range: Bernese Alps

The Tschingellochtighorn is a mountain of the Bernese Alps, located south of Adelboden in the Bernese Oberland. It overlooks the Engstligenalp on its western side.
