= Tête du Portail =

Mountain in Switzerland

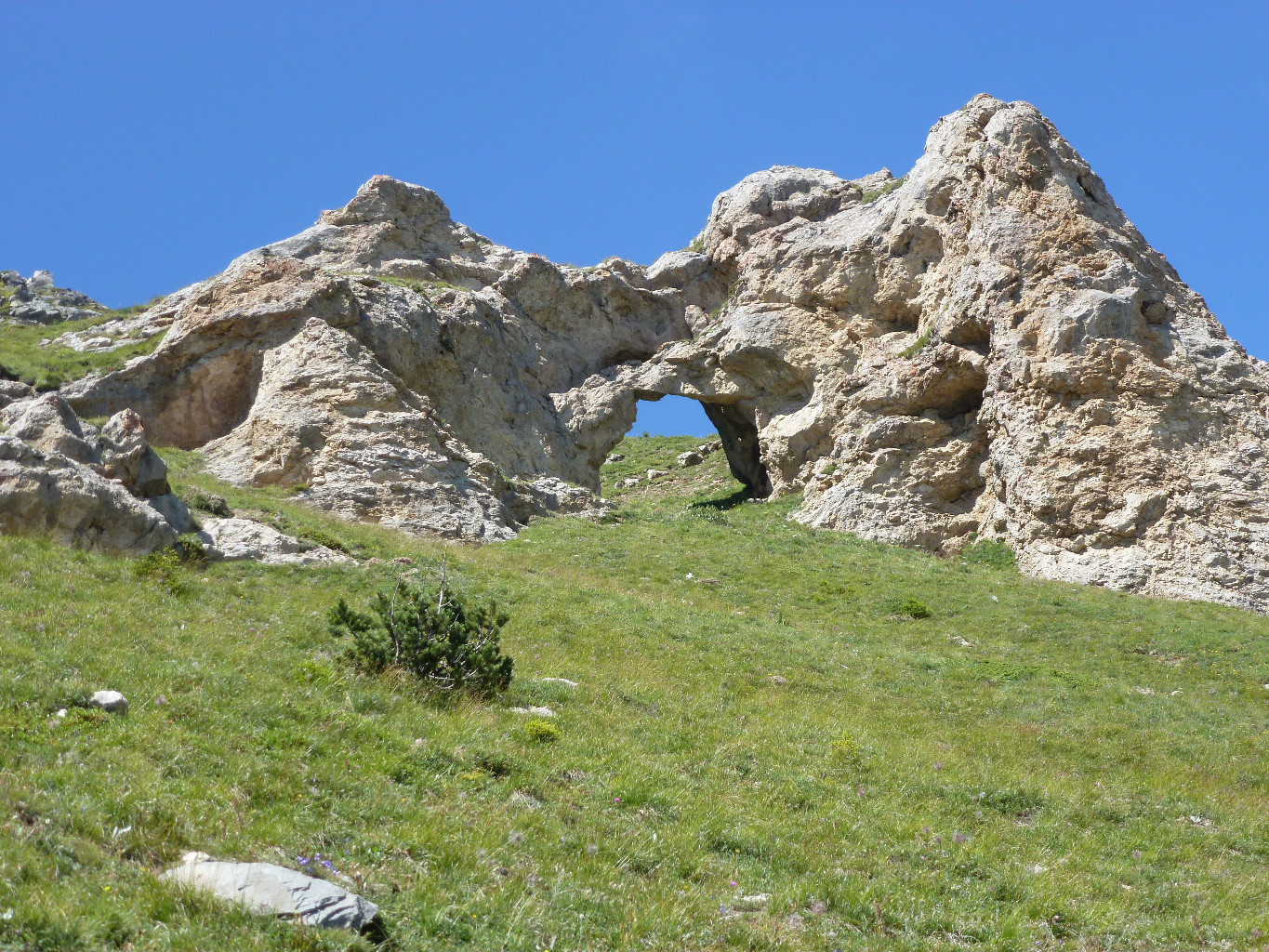
- The Portail de Fully near the summit

Highest point
- Elevation: 2,335 m (7,661 ft)
- Prominence: 45 m (148 ft)
- Parent peak: Grand Muveran
- Coordinates: 46°9′32.6″N 7°5′17.7″E

Geography
- Location within Switzerland
- Location: Valais, Switzerland
- Parent range: Bernese Alps

The Tête du Portail (2,335 m) is a mountain located at the western extremity of the Bernese Alps, in the Swiss canton of Valais. It lies north of Martigny and Fully, in the Dent de Morcles-Grand Muveran group.

The mountain is named after a natural arch, the Portail de Fully, located near the summit at a height of 2,270 metres.
