= Steinlauihorn =

Mountain in Switzerland

- Location within Switzerland

Highest point
- Elevation: 3,162 m (10,374 ft)
- Prominence: 103 m (338 ft)
- Parent peak: Ritzlihorn
- Coordinates: 46°37′6.5″N 8°15′16.3″E

Geography
- Location: Bern, Switzerland
- Parent range: Bernese Alps

The Steinlauihorn is a mountain of the Bernese Alps, overlooking Handegg in the Bernese Oberland. It lies south of the Ritzlihorn, on the range separating the valley of the Gauli Glacier from the main Aar valley.
