= Petersgrat =

Mountain in Switzerland

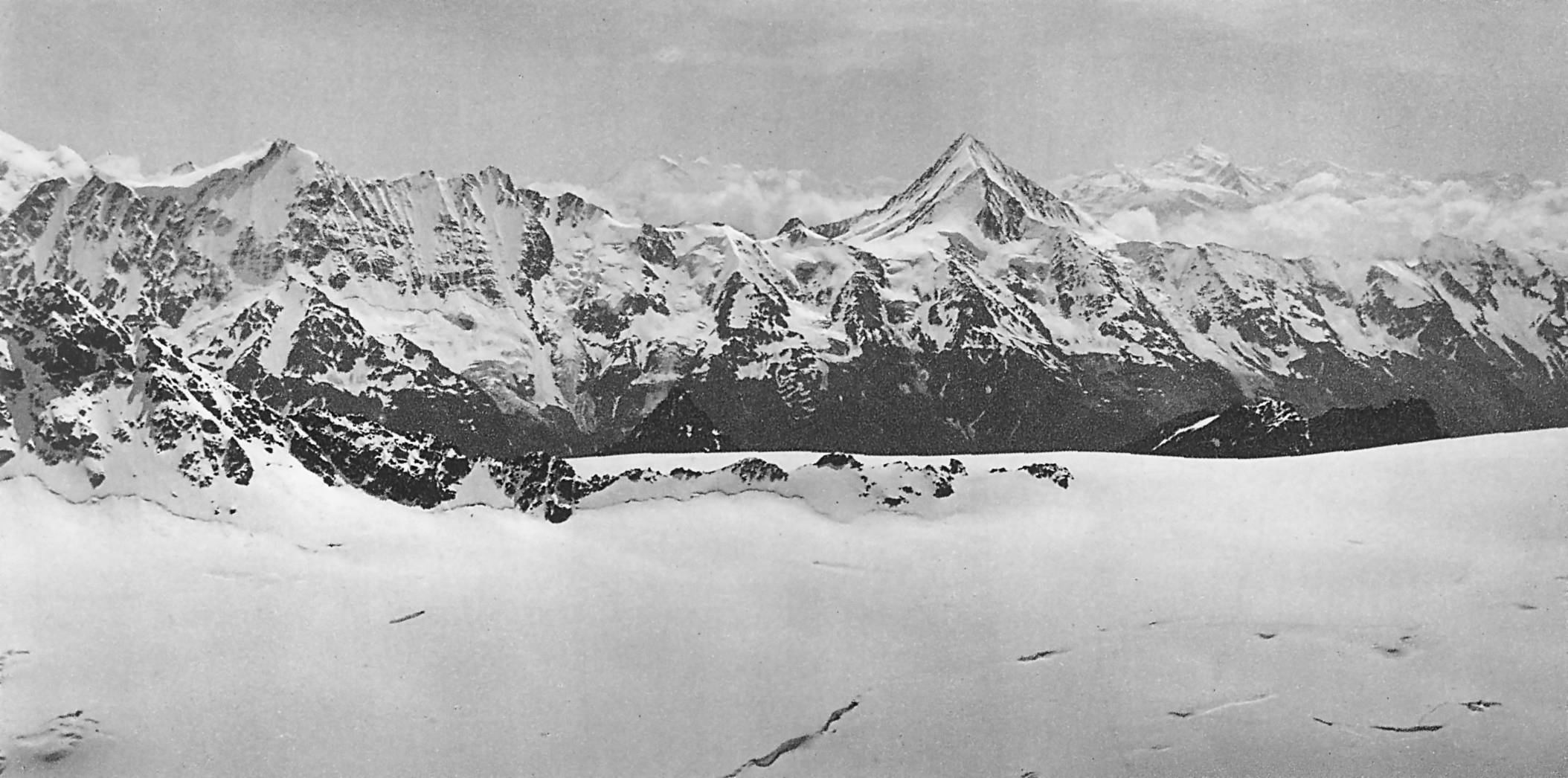
- The Petersgrat in 1910 (summit not visible)

Highest point
- Elevation: 3,202 m (10,505 ft)
- Prominence: 81 m (266 ft)
- Coordinates: 46°27′42.9″N 7°48′30.4″E

Geography
- Location within Switzerland
- Location: Bern/Valais, Switzerland
- Parent range: Bernese Alps

The Petersgrat is a mountain of the Bernese Alps, located on the border between the Swiss cantons of Bern and Valais. It consists of a large ridge, which is entirely covered by ice. The northern side belongs to the basin of the large Kander Glacier. On the southern side (Lötschental) the glacier is smaller and is named Tellingletscher.

The Petersgrat is a popular destination for heliskiing and snow landing.
