= Hohmad =

Mountain in Switzerland

- Location within Switzerland

Highest point
- Elevation: 2,076 m (6,811 ft)
- Prominence: 116 m (381 ft)
- Parent peak: Chrummfadenflue (2,079 m)
- Coordinates: 46°42′18.9″N 07°29′40″E

Geography
- Location: Bern, Switzerland
- Parent range: Bernese Alps

The Hohmad (also spelled Homad) is a mountain of the Bernese Alps, located south of Blumenstein in the canton of Bern. It lies on the range north of the Simmental, approximately halfway between the Gantrisch and the Stockhorn.
