= Wannihorn =

Mountain in Switzerland

- Location within Switzerland

Highest point
- Elevation: 3,116 m (10,223 ft)
- Coordinates: 46°21′53.9″N 7°47′27.6″E

Geography
- Location: Valais, Switzerland
- Parent range: Bernese Alps

The Wannihorn is a mountain of the Bernese Alps, located north of Hohtenn in the canton of Valais. It lies south of the Wilerhorn, on the range between the lower Lötschental and the Jolital.
