= Vanil des Cours =

Mountain in Switzerland

- Location within Switzerland

Highest point
- Elevation: 1,562 m (5,125 ft)
- Prominence: 293 m (961 ft)
- Parent peak: Vanil Noir
- Coordinates: 46°38′21″N 7°8′18″E

Geography
- Location: Fribourg, Switzerland
- Parent range: Swiss Prealps

The Vanil des Cours (1,562) is a mountain of the Swiss Prealps, overlooking the Lake of Gruyère in the canton of Fribourg. It lies in the group culminating at La Berra.
