= Vanil d'Arpille =

Mountain in Switzerland

- Maischüpfenspitz
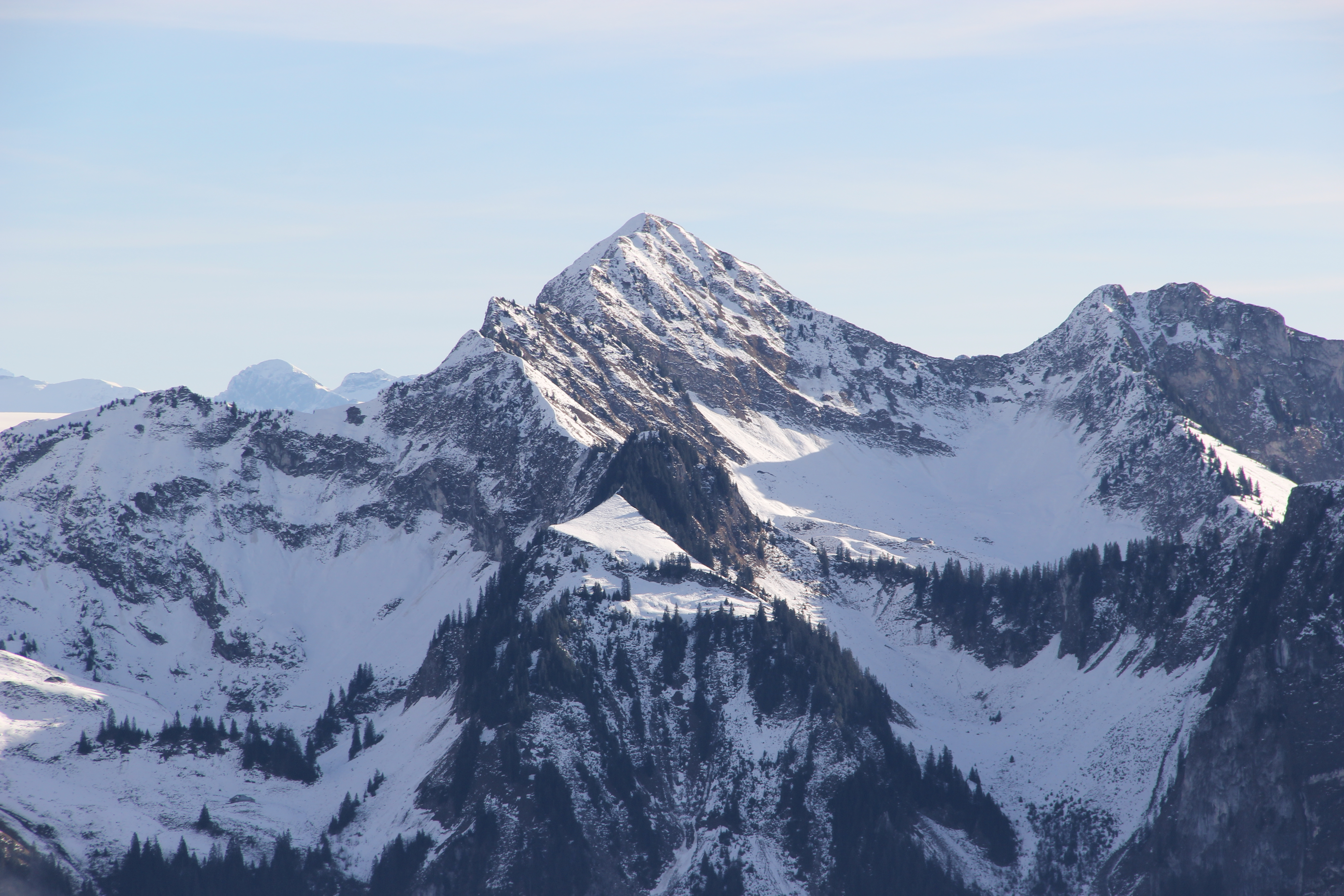
- Vanil d'Arpille.

Highest point
- Elevation: 2,085 m (6,841 ft)
- Prominence: 235 m (771 ft)
- Parent peak: Schopfenspitz
- Coordinates: 46°37′03″N 7°14′27″E

Geography
- Location within Switzerland
- Location: Fribourg, Switzerland
- Parent range: Swiss Prealps

The Vanil d'Arpille (also known as Maischüpfenspitz) is a mountain of the Swiss Prealps, located north of Im Fang in the canton of Fribourg.
