= Gstellihorn =

Mountain in Switzerland

- Location within Switzerland

Highest point
- Elevation: 2,855 m (9,367 ft)
- Prominence: 366 m (1,201 ft)
- Parent peak: Finsteraarhorn
- Coordinates: 46°39′43″N 8°10′29.5″E

Geography
- Location: Bern, Switzerland
- Parent range: Bernese Alps

The Gstellihorn (2,855 m) is a mountain of the Bernese Alps, located west of Innertkirchen in the Bernese Oberland. It is the highest summit of the Engelhörner, the chain between the Reichenbachtal and the Urbachtal.
