= Nasse Strahlegg =

Mountain in Switzerland

- Location within Switzerland

Highest point
- Elevation: 3,485 m (11,434 ft)
- Prominence: 170 m (560 ft)
- Parent peak: Schreckhorn
- Coordinates: 46°33′12″N 08°07′58″E

Geography
- Location: Bern, Switzerland
- Parent range: Bernese Alps

Climbing
- Easiest route: rock/snow climb

The Nasse Strahlegg (3,485 m) is a peak of the Bernese Alps, located east of the Finsteraarjoch in the canton of Bern. It is the culminating point of the small range descending from the south-west ridge of the Lauteraarhorn, between the valleys of the Lower Grindelwald Glacier and the Unteraar Glacier.
