= Löffelhorn =

Mountain in Switzerland

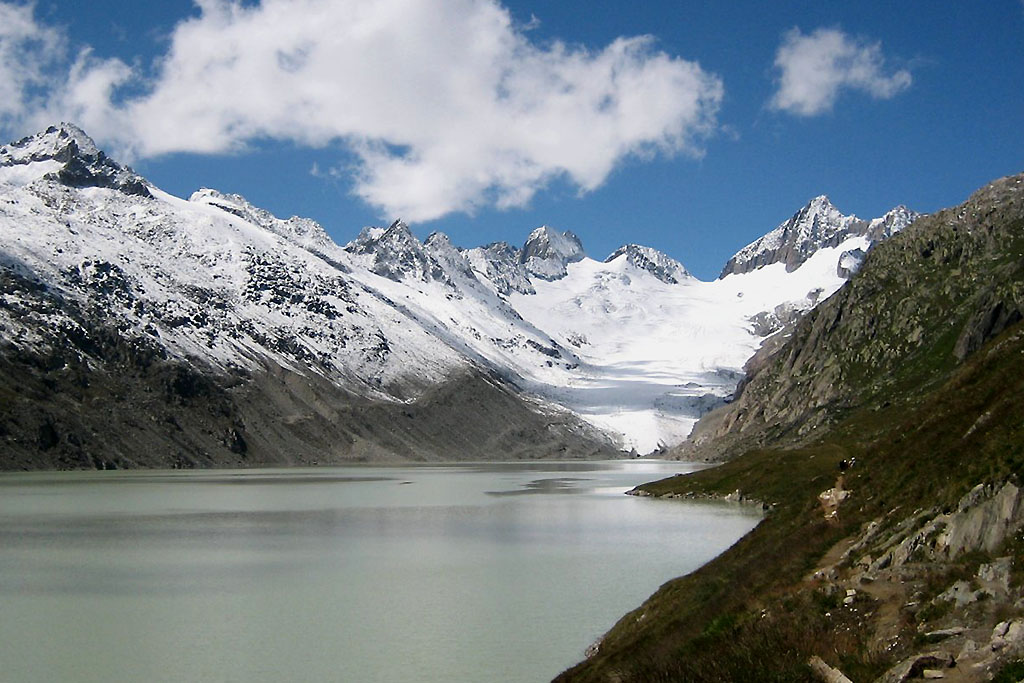
- The Löffelhorn (left summit) from the Oberaarsee

Highest point
- Elevation: 3,096 m (10,157 ft)
- Prominence: 167 m (548 ft)
- Parent peak: Finsteraarhorn
- Coordinates: 46°31′36.4″N 8°14′13.3″E

Geography
- Location within Switzerland
- Location: Bern/Valais, Switzerland
- Parent range: Bernese Alps

The Löffelhorn is a mountain of the Bernese Alps, located on the border between the Swiss cantons of Bern and Valais. It is part of the Aargrat, a range east of the Oberaarhorn that separates the valley of the Oberaar Glacier from the valley of Goms.
