= Oberaarjoch =

Mountain pass in Switzerland

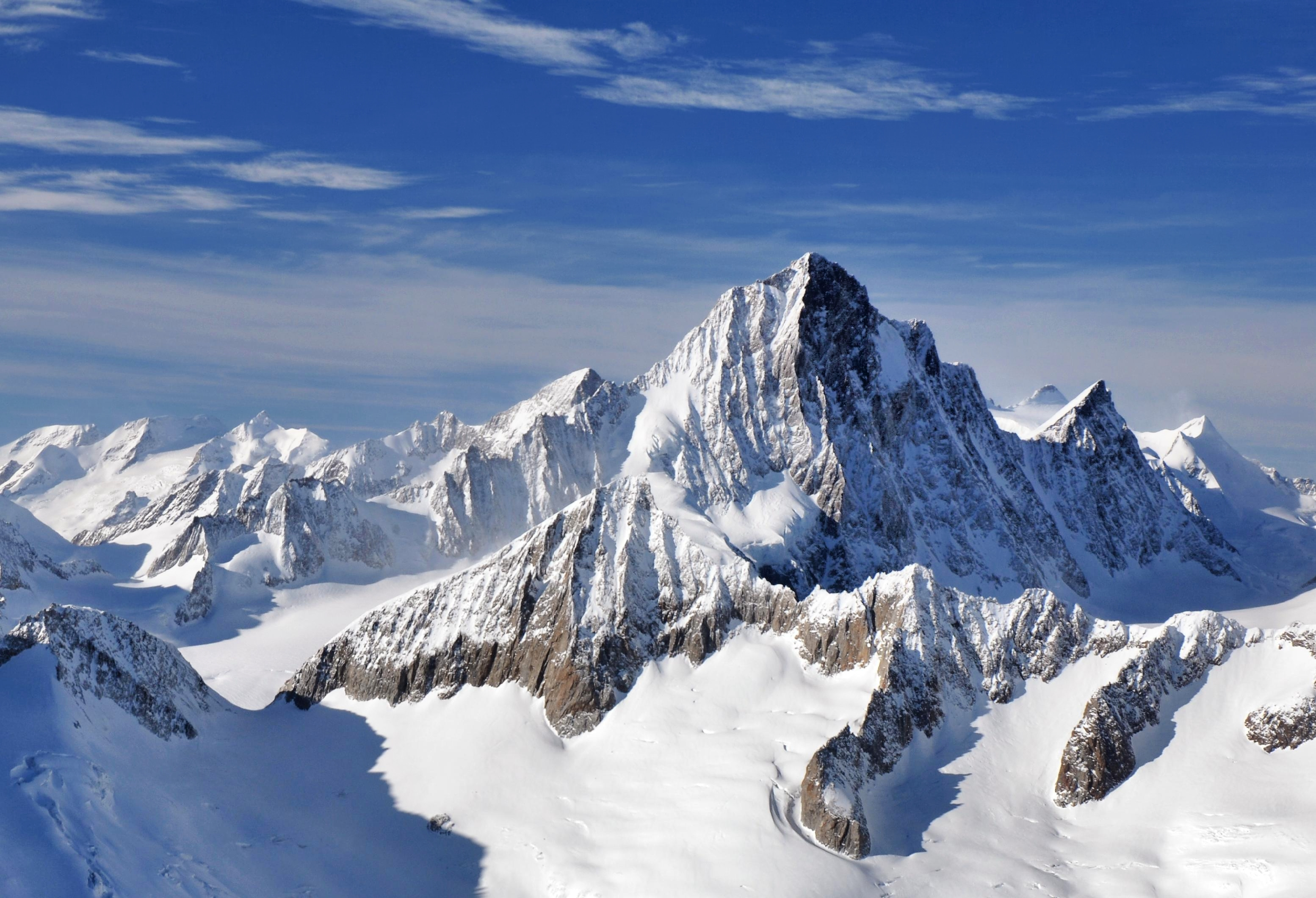
- The Oberaarjoch (foreground left) and the Finsteraarhorn seen from the east side

- Location within Switzerland
- Elevation: 3,205 metres (10,515 ft)
- Traversed by: Glacier

Third Approach
- Location: Valais, Switzerland
- Range: Bernese Alps
- Coordinates: 46°31′32″N 8°10′26″E

The Oberaarjoch (el. 3205 m.) is a high mountain pass across the eastern Bernese Alps, connecting the Fiescher Glacier in the canton of Valais to the Oberaar Glacier in the canton Bern. The pass is located between the Oberaarhorn on the north and the Oberaarrothorn on the south. Above the col, on the Valais side, lies the Oberaarjoch Hut.

The nearest settlements are Fieschertal (Valais) and Handegg (Bern).

== See also ==
- List of mountain passes in Switzerland
