= Schreckhorn =

Mountain in Switzerland

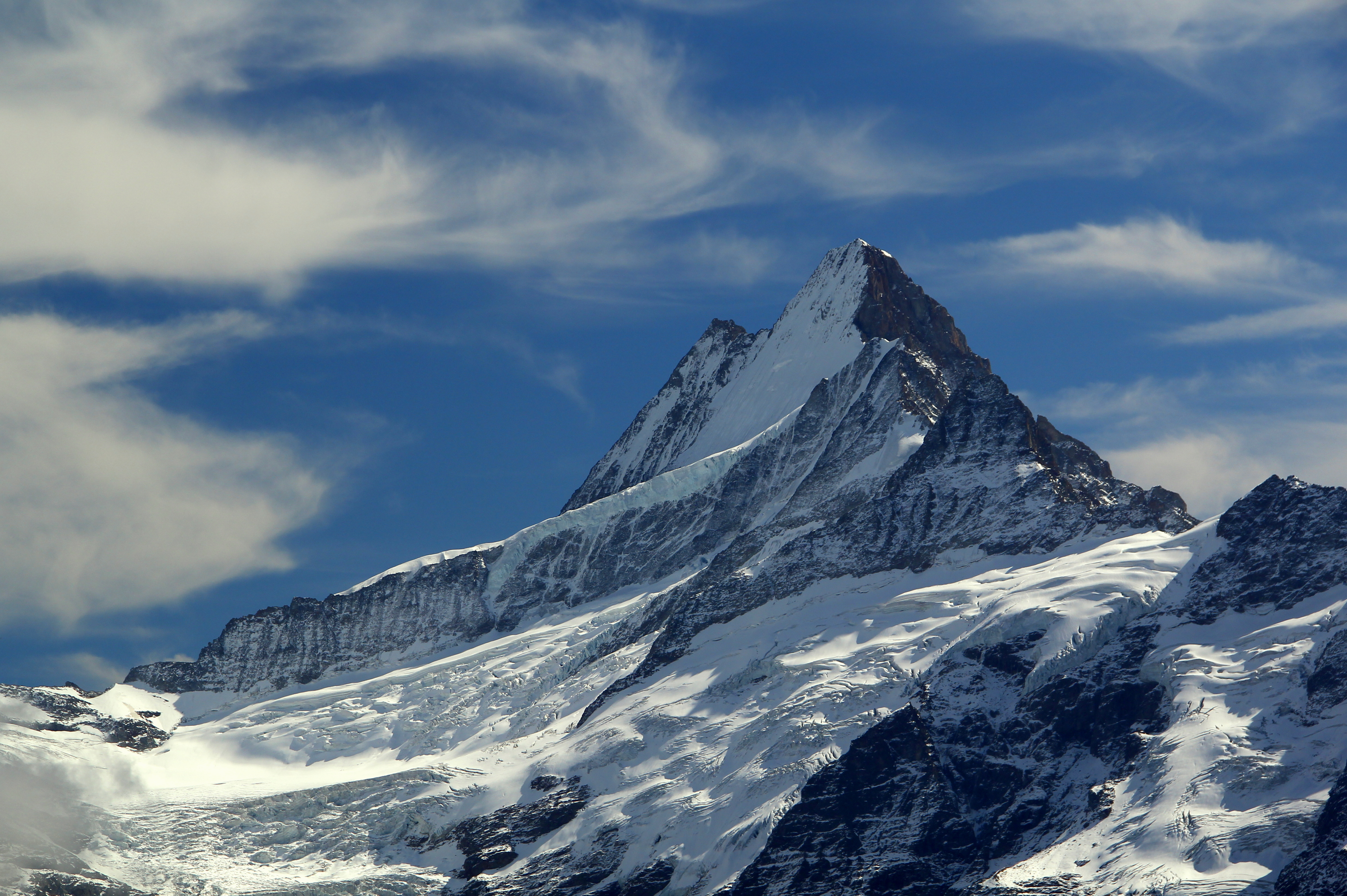
- The Schreckhorn from the north

Highest point
- Elevation: 4,078 m (13,379 ft)
- Prominence: 795 m (2,608 ft)
- Parent peak: Finsteraarhorn
- Isolation: 5.5 km (3.4 mi)
- Coordinates: 46°35′23.9″N 8°07′05.3″E

Naming
- English translation: Peak of terror

Geography
- Location within Switzerland
- Location: Canton of Bern, Switzerland
- Parent range: Bernese Alps

Climbing
- First ascent: 16 August 1861 by Leslie Stephen and party
- Normal route: south-west ridge

The Schreckhorn (4,078 m) is a mountain in the Bernese Alps. It is the highest peak located entirely in the canton of Bern. The Schreckhorn is the northernmost Alpine four-thousander and the northernmost summit rising above 4,000 metres in Europe.

== Geography ==
The Schreckhorn is located 10 km south-east of Grindelwald between the Upper and Lower Grindelwald Glacier. The region is made up of uninhabited glacial valleys, the great Aar Glaciers and the Fiescher Glacier. The summit of the Lauteraarhorn is located very close and reaches almost the same altitude. The highest peak of the Bernese Alps, the Finsteraarhorn, lies 6 km to the south.

Geologically the Schreckhorn is part of the Aarmassif.

== Climbing history ==
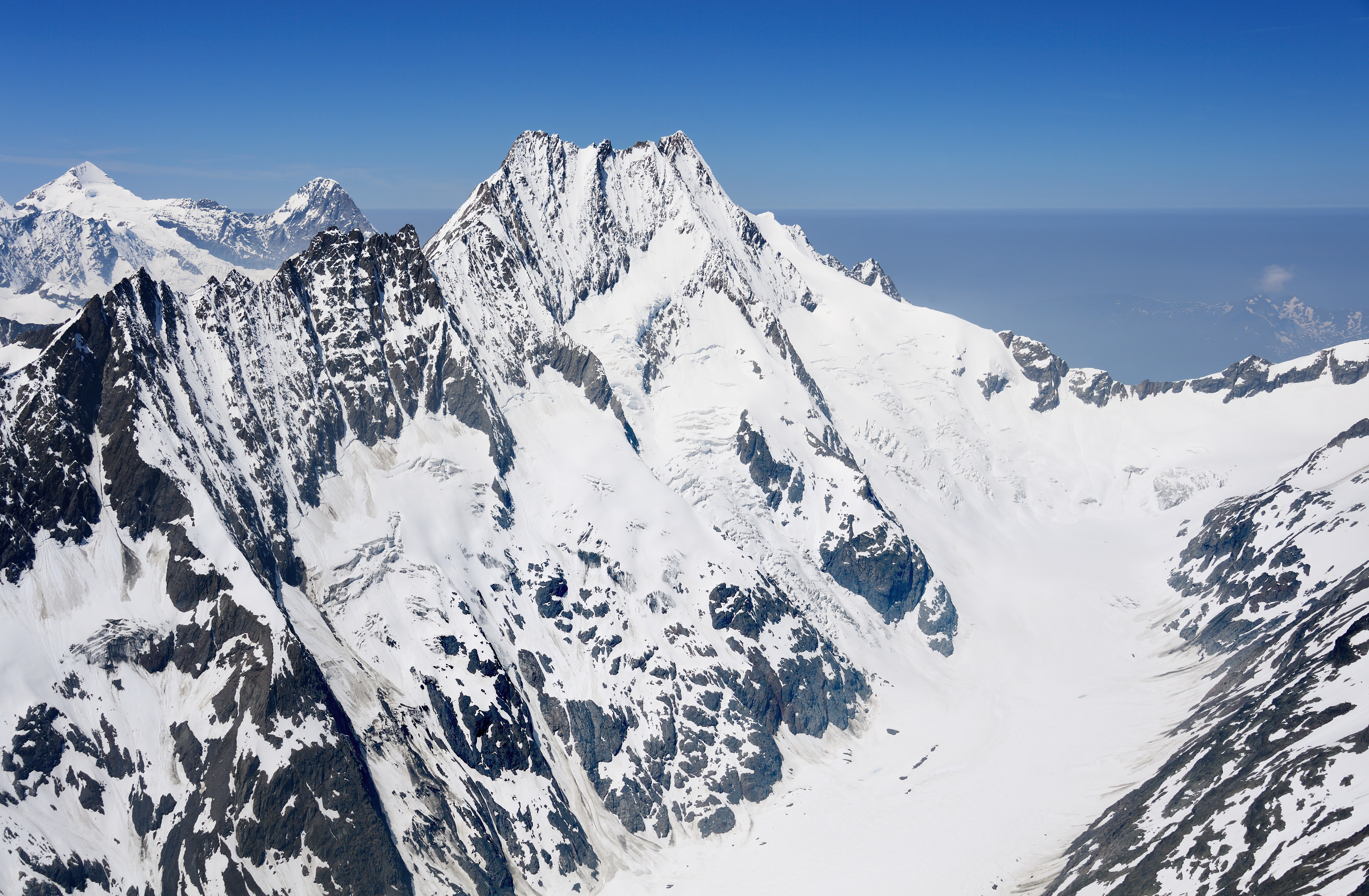
Aerial view of the Schreckhorn (right) and the Lauteraarhorn (left) from the east

The first ascent was on 16 August 1861 by Leslie Stephen, Ulrich Kaufmann, Christian Michel and Peter Michel. Their route of ascent, via the upper Schreck Couloir to the Schrecksattel and then by the south-east ridge, was the normal route for the following fifty years, but is now seldom used.

The peak had been attempted several times before this, most notably by the Swiss naturalist Joseph Hugi in 1828 and the guided party of Pierre Jean Édouard Desor (a Swiss geologist) in 1842. 'The ambition of hoisting the first flag on the Schreckhorn, the one big Bernese summit which was untrodden, was far too obvious for us to resist', Desor later wrote, but they climbed a secondary summit of the Lauteraarhorn by mistake.

The first ascent by the south-west ridge (AD+) – the normal route by which the Schreckhorn is climbed – was made by John Wicks, Edward Branby and Claude Wilson on 26 July 1902. They decided to climb the very steep ridge without the help of local guides and succeeded in reaching the summit. The north-west ridge (the Andersongrat, D) was first climbed by John Stafford Anderson and George Percival Baker, with guides Ulrich Almer and Aloys Pollinger on 7 August 1883.

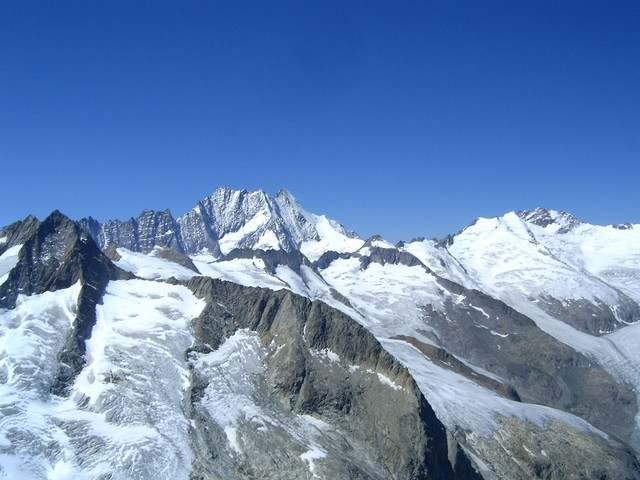
The north-east flanks of the Lauteraarhorn (left centre) and the Schreckhorn (right centre) as seen from the Diamantstock

The Strahlegg Hut, destroyed by an avalanche, has been replaced by the Schreckhorn Hut (2,520 m). The Schreckhorn may also be ascended from the Gleckstein Hut (2,317 m) and the Lauteraar Hut (2,392 m).

== See also ==
- List of 4000 metre peaks of the Alps
