= Studerhorn =

Mountain in Switzerland

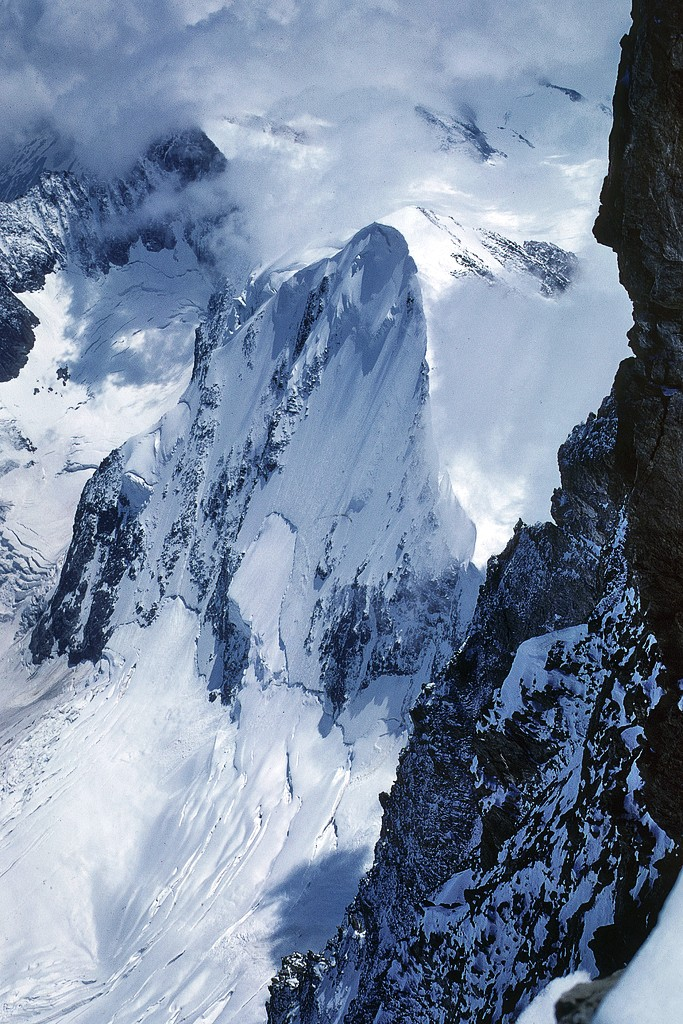
- The Studerhorn (centre) from the Finsteraarhorn

Highest point
- Elevation: 3,632 m (11,916 ft)
- Prominence: 230 m (750 ft)
- Parent peak: Finsteraarhorn
- Isolation: 0.99 km (0.62 mi) to P.3694
- Coordinates: 46°31′58″N 8°8′52″E

Geography
- Location within Switzerland
- Location: Bern/Valais, Switzerland
- Parent range: Bernese Alps

The Studerhorn (3,632 m) is a mountain of the Bernese Alps, located on the border between the Swiss cantons of Bern and Valais. It lies between the Finsteraarhorn and the Oberaarhorn, on the ridge separating the basins of the Unteraar Glacier (north) and the Fiescher Glacier (south).

The mountain was named in honour of the Swiss geologist Gottlieb Samuel Studer.

== See also ==
- List of mountains of Switzerland named after people
