= Oberaarrothorn =

Mountain in Switzerland

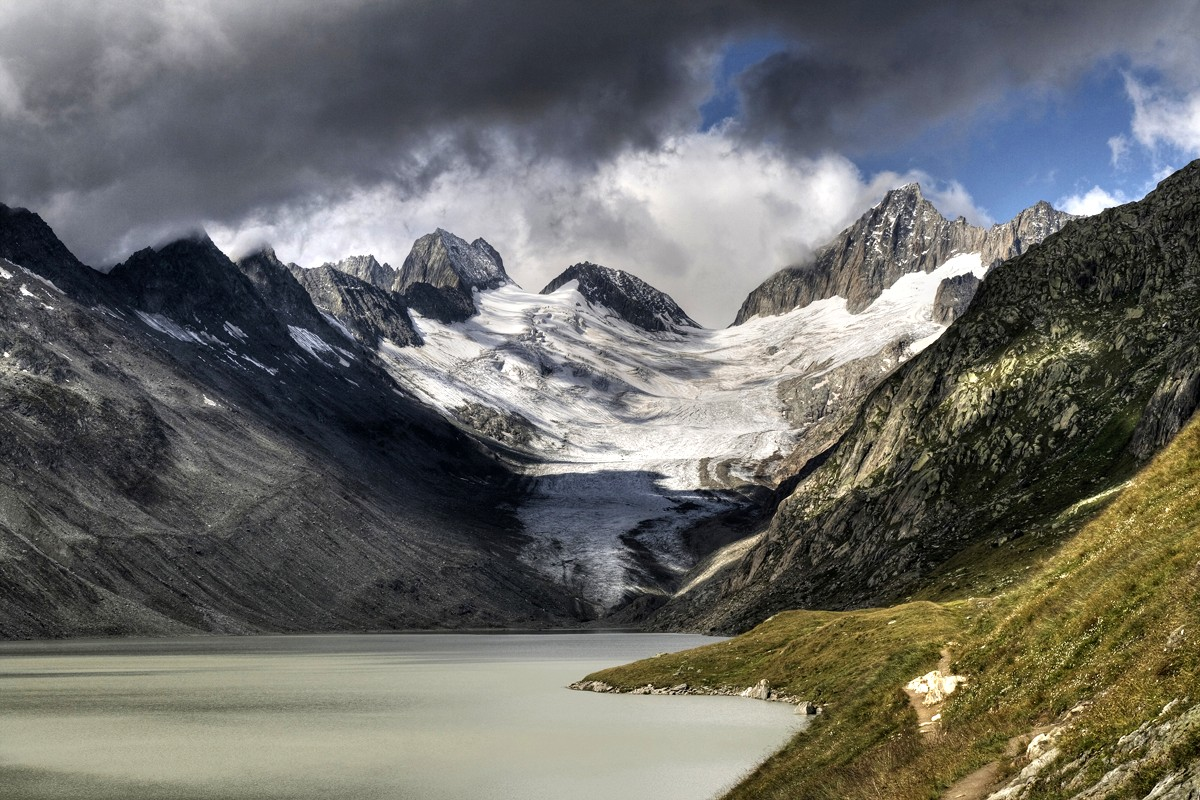
- Oberaarrothorn from Oberaarsee (center-left)

Highest point
- Elevation: 3,477 m (11,407 ft)
- Prominence: 184 m (604 ft)
- Parent peak: (Vorderes) Galmihorn
- Coordinates: 46°31′13.4″N 8°10′51.3″E

Geography
- Location within Switzerland
- Location: Valais/Bern, Switzerland
- Parent range: Bernese Alps

The Oberaarrothorn is a mountain of the Bernese Alps, on the border between the Swiss cantons of Valais and Bern. It is south of the Oberaarjoch, between the Fiescher Glacier and the Oberaar Glacier.
