= Oberaarjoch Hut =

Coordinates: 46°31′34″N 8°10′23″E

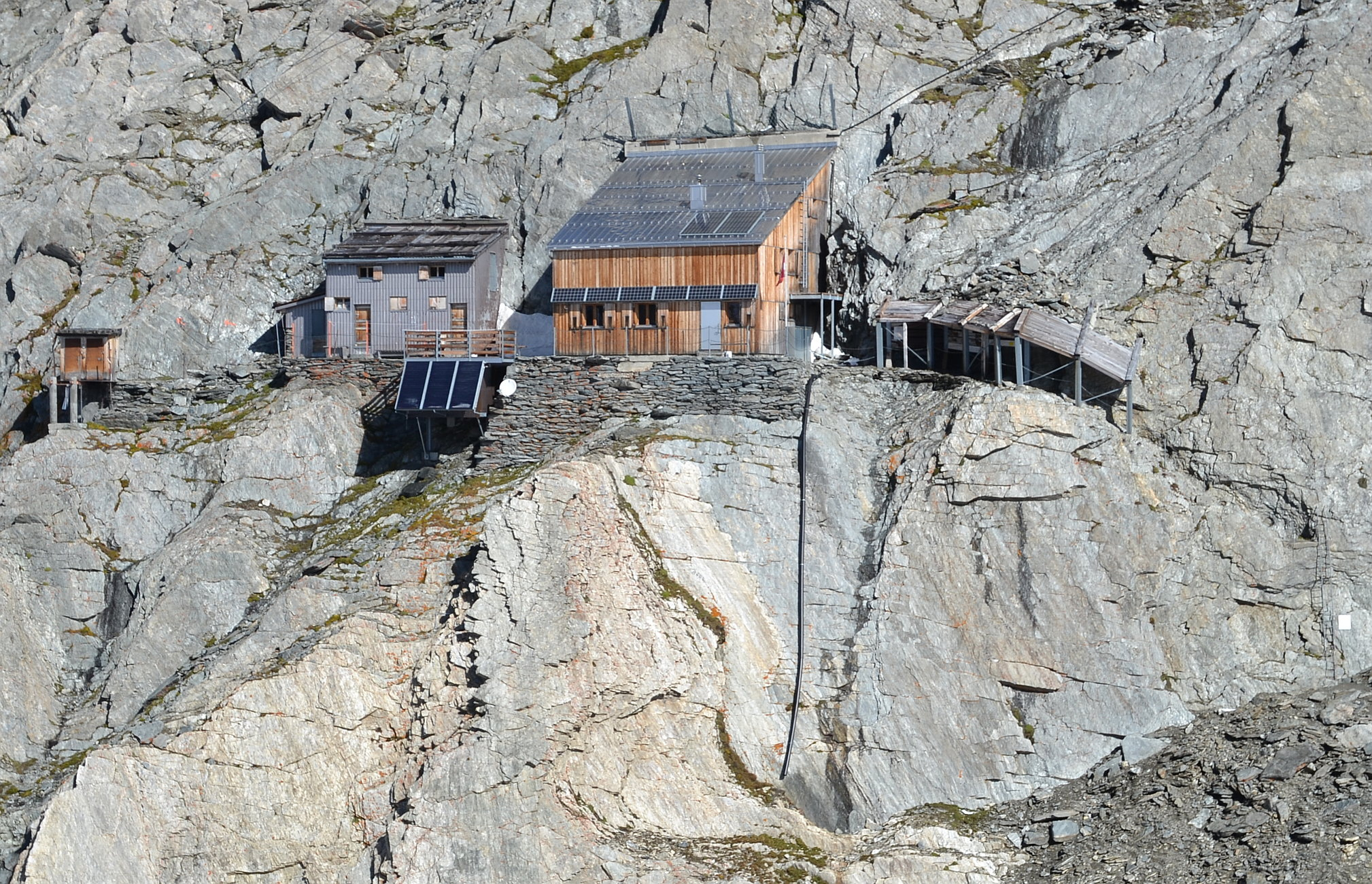
Oberaarjoch Hut

The Oberaarjoch Hut (German: Oberaarjochhütte) is a mountain hut of the Swiss Alpine Club, located north of Fieschertal in the canton of Valais, close to the canton of Bern. The hut lies at a height of 3,258 metres above sea level at the foot of the Oberaarhorn, just above the Oberaarjoch, the glacier pass connecting the Fiescher Glacier from the Oberaar Glacier. All accesses to the hut involve glacier crossing.

== See also ==
- List of buildings and structures above 3000 m in Switzerland
