= Wasenhorn (Bernese Alps) =

Mountain in Switzerland

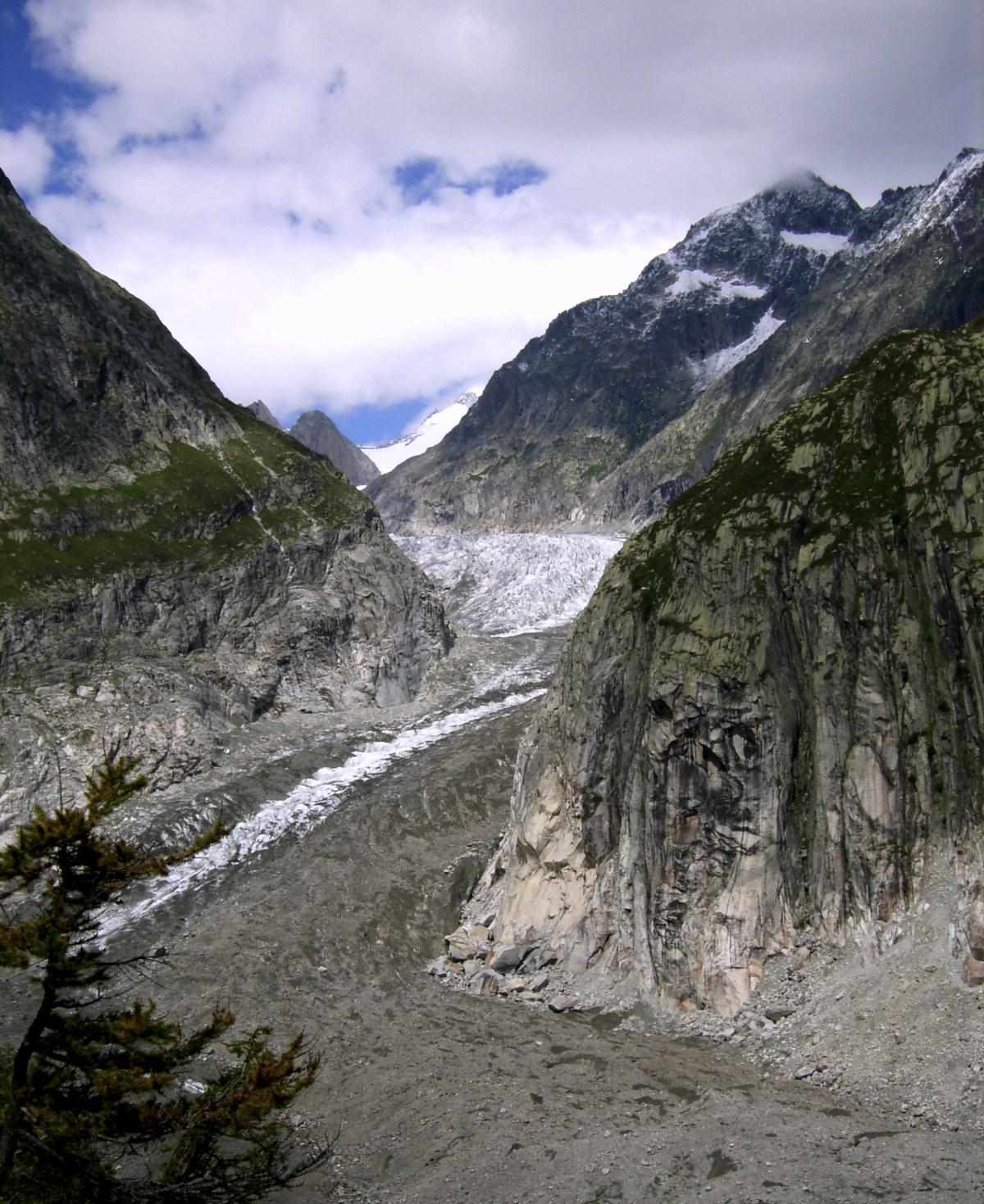
- Wasenhorn (right summit) from the Fiescher Glacier

Highest point
- Elevation: 3,447 m (11,309 ft)
- Prominence: 303 m (994 ft)
- Parent peak: Finsteraarhorn
- Listing: Alpine mountains above 3000 m
- Coordinates: 46°29′52.7″N 8°9′56.8″E

Geography
- Location within Switzerland
- Location: Valais, Switzerland
- Parent range: Bernese Alps

Climbing
- First ascent: 14 August 1885 by the Hungarian couple Bela and Hermine Tauscher-Geduly with the South Tyrolean guides Alois Pinggera and Joseph Reinstadler

The Wasenhorn is a mountain of the Bernese Alps, located north of Blitzingen in the canton of Valais. It lies on the range south of the Oberaarrothorn, that separates the valley of the Fiescher Glacier from the main Rhone valley.
