= Aargletschers =

Glaciers in Switzerland

Albigna Glacier
- Aargletschers
- Location within Canton of Bern Location within Canton of Valais Location within Switzerland Location within Alps
- Interactive map of Albigna Glacier
- Location: Bern, Switzerland
- Coordinates: 46°34′10″N 8°11′30″E

The Aargletschers, literally "Aare-Glaciers", are a system of glaciers located at the sources of the Aare river in the Bernese Alps, Switzerland. In the original German the name is "Aargletscher" both in singular and plural, as in German the plural of "gletscher" is only marked by a change of the article: der Gletscher (one glacier), die Gletscher (many glaciers). The Aargletschers are constituted by two distinct partial glacier systems:

- Unteraargletscher: composed by the converging Lauteraargletscher and Finsteraargletscher, between the Lauteraarhorn, Finsteraarhorn (46°32′14.9″N 08°07′33.7″E) and Grimselsee (46°34′11″N 08°19′39″E).
- Oberaargletscher: between Oberaarhorn (46°31′53″N 08°10′28″E) and Oberaarsee (46°33′N 08°16′E).

Grimselsee and Oberaarsee are recent reserve lakes. The "...-Aar-Horns" are summits of more than 3600 metres above sea level, two of them even above 4000 metres.

== See also ==
- Rhône Glacier
