= Lauteraar Hut =

Coordinates: 46°34′12″N 8°13′20″E

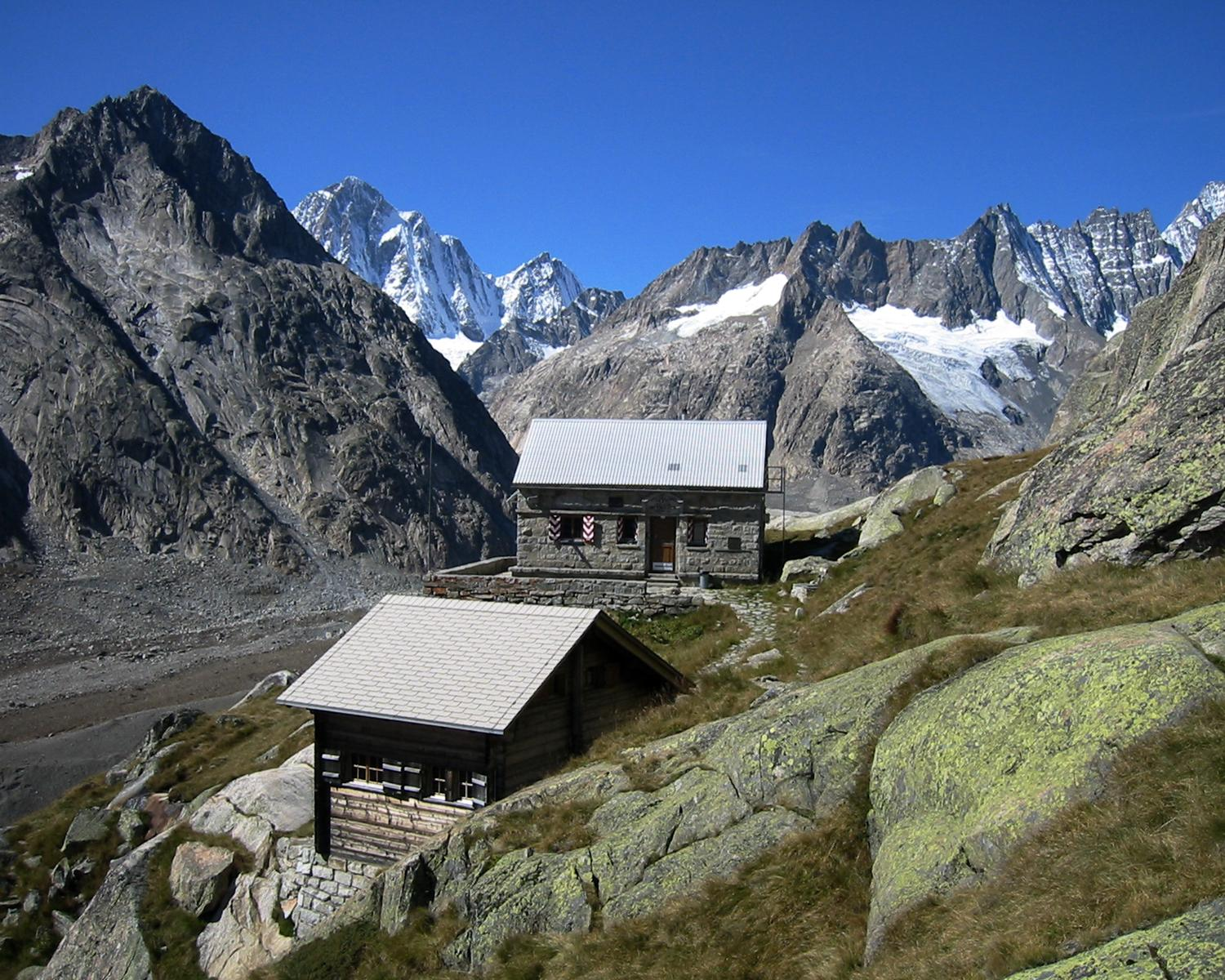
The Lauteraar Hut with the Finsteraarhorn in background

The Lauteraar Hut (German: Lauteraarhütte) is a mountain hut of the Swiss Alpine Club, located south-west of Handegg in the canton of Bern. The hut lies at a height of 2,392 metres (7,848 ft) above sea level, above the Unteraar Glacier, at the foot of the Hienderstock in the Bernese Alps.

The shortest access to the hut is from the Grimsel Hospice, below the Grimsel Pass.
