= Hienderstock =

Mountain in the Bernese Alps

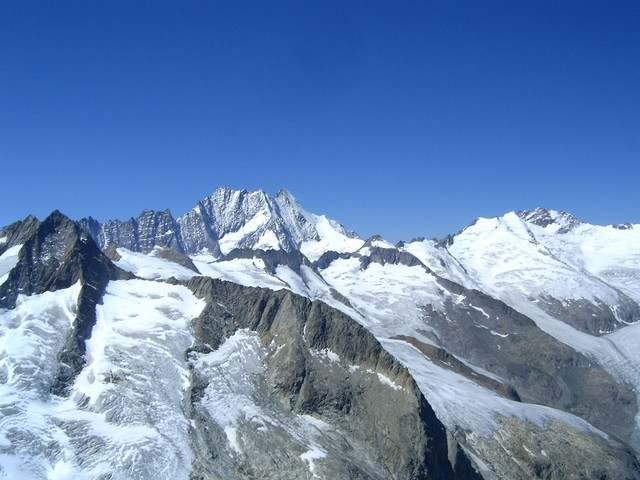
- Hienderstock (far left), the northern flanks of the Lauteraarhorn (centre) and the Bärglistock (right)

Highest point
- Elevation: 3,307 m (10,850 ft)
- Prominence: 208 m (682 ft)
- Parent peak: Finsteraarhorn
- Coordinates: 46°35′7.7″N 8°12′58.1″E

Geography
- Location within Switzerland
- Location: Bern, Switzerland
- Parent range: Bernese Alps

The Hienderstock (named Hühnerstock on the Siegfried Map) is a mountain in the Bernese Alps, located between the Gauli Glacier and the Unteraar Glacier, in the canton of Bern. Its main summit has an elevation of 3,307 metres above sea level.
