= Bächlistock =

Mountain of the Bernese Alps

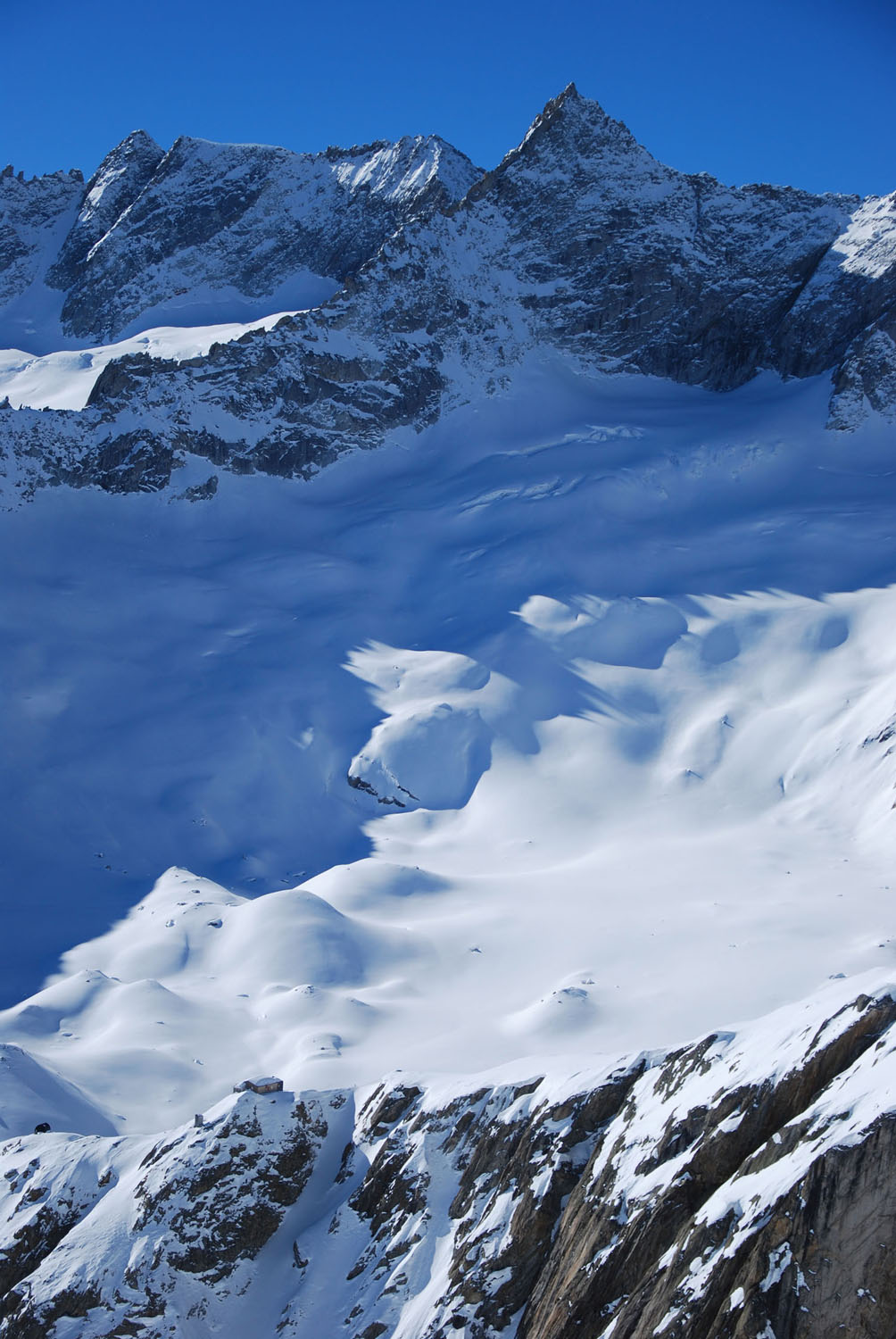
- The Bächlistock (left) and the Grosser Diamantstock (centre right) from the north side

Highest point
- Elevation: 3,246 m (10,650 ft)
- Prominence: 197 m (646 ft)
- Parent peak: Finsteraarhorn
- Coordinates: 46°35′11″N 8°14′23″E

Geography
- Location within Switzerland
- Location: Bern, Switzerland
- Parent range: Bernese Alps

The Bächlistock is a mountain of the Bernese Alps, overlooking the Unteraar Glacier in the canton of Bern. Its summit has an elevation of 3,246 metres above sea level and is the tripoint between the glacier valleys of Hiendertelltigletscher, Bächligletscher and Unteraar.
