= Oberaarhorn =

Mountain in Switzerland

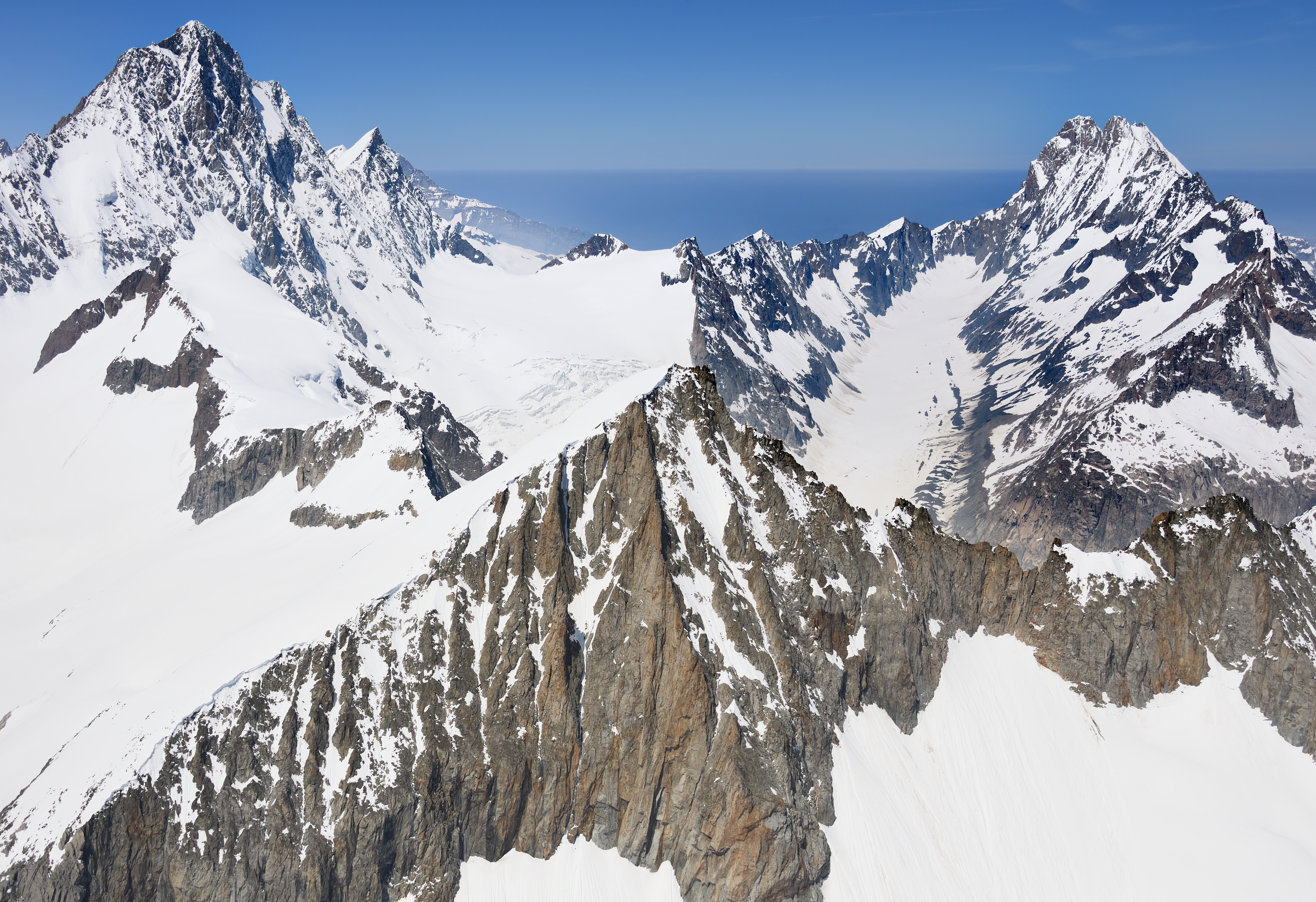
- Aerial view of the Oberaarhorn from the southeast; the Finsteraarhorn and the Agassizhorn are in the background to the left, the Schreckhorn and the Lauteraarhorn are in the background to the right

Highest point
- Elevation: 3,631 m (11,913 ft)
- Prominence: 260 m (850 ft)
- Parent peak: Studerhorn (line parent)
- Isolation: 2.05 km (1.27 mi) to Studerhorn
- Coordinates: 46°31′53″N 8°10′28″E

Geography
- Location within Switzerland
- Location: Valais/Bern, Switzerland
- Parent range: Bernese Alps

The Oberaarhorn is a mountain of the Bernese Alps, located on the border between the Swiss cantons of Valais and Bern. Its summit (3,631 metres) is the tripoint between the basins of the Fiesch (Valais), Unteraar and Oberaar Glacier (Bern).
