= Finsteraarhorn Hut =

Coordinates: 46°31′19″N 8°06′52″E

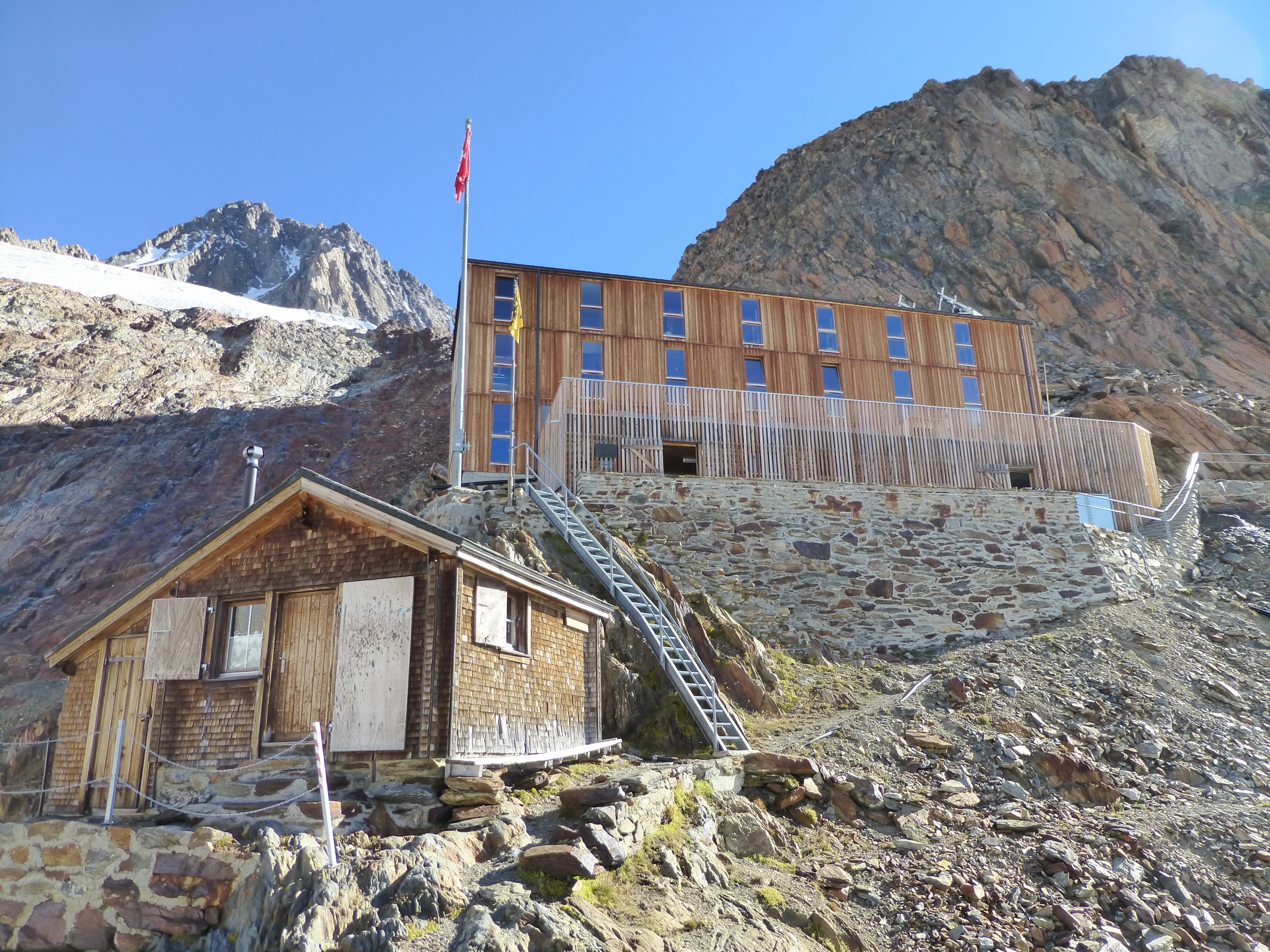
The Finsteraarhorn Hut with the Finsteraarhorn in background

The Finsteraarhorn Hut (German: Finsteraarhornhütte) is a mountain hut of the Swiss Alpine Club, located north of Fieschertal in the canton of Valais. It lies at a height of 3,048 metres (10,000 ft) above sea level at the southern foot of the Finsteraarhorn, the highest peak of the Bernese Alps. The hut overlooks the upper basin of the Fiescher Glacier, which is among the largest of the range. It is located a few kilometres east of the Grünhornlücke.

The hut is set in a very remote area and is accessible only to mountaineers as all accesses involve glacier crossing. The shortest access is from the Jungfraujoch train station (6 hours). The Finsteraarhorn Hut is the base of the normal route to the summit of Finsteraarhorn, it is also used to climb other high summits in the area (Gross Fiescherhorn, Grünhorn).

== See also ==
- List of buildings and structures above 3000 m in Switzerland
