= Schreckhorn Hut =

Coordinates: 46°34′55″N 8°05′55″E

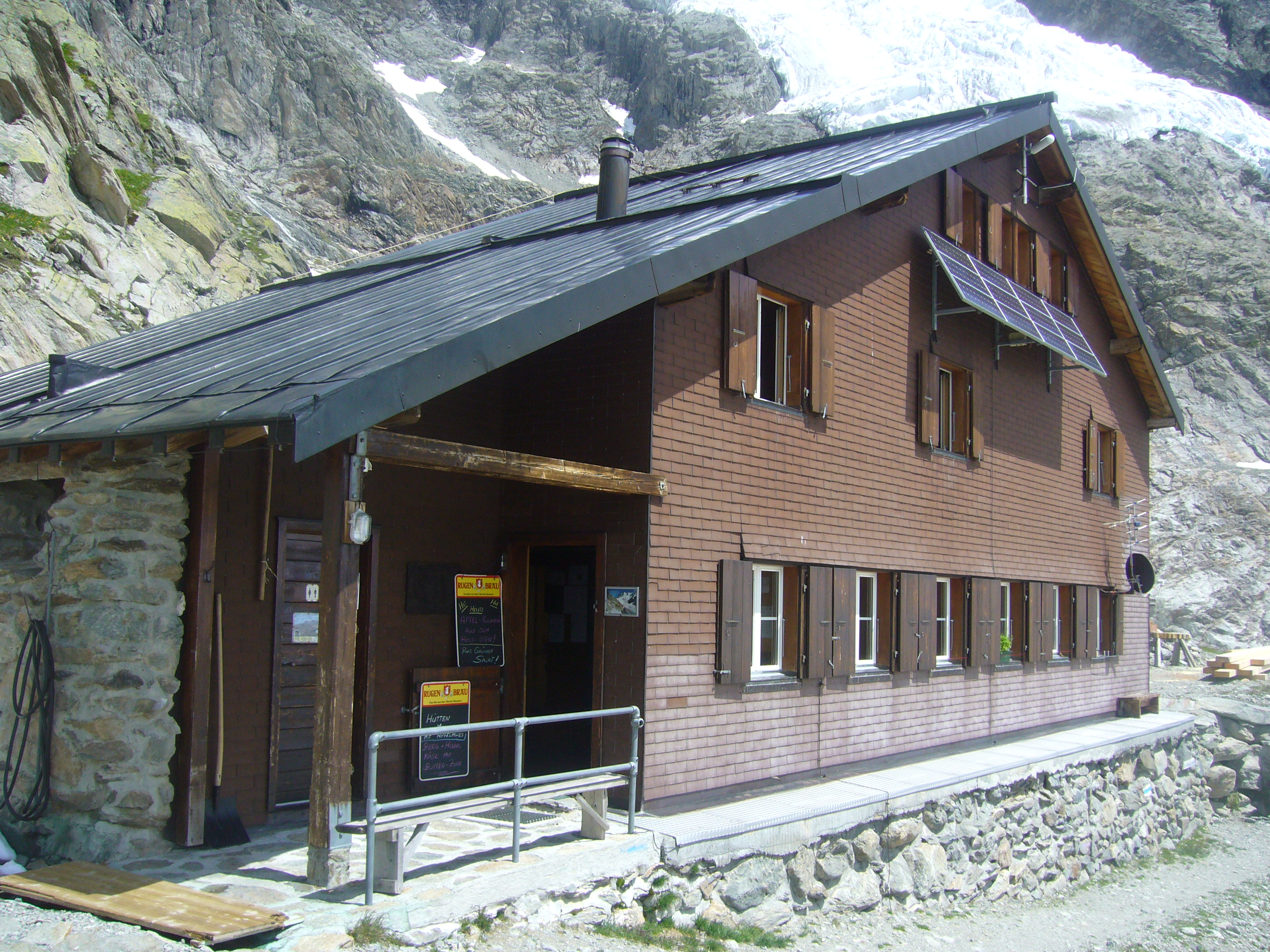
The Schreckhorn Hut

The Schreckhorn Hut (German: Schreckhornhütte) is a mountain hut of the Swiss Alpine Club, located south of Grindelwald in the canton of Bern. The hut lies at a height of 2,529 metres above sea level, above the Lower Grindelwald Glacier, at the foot of the Schreckhorn in the Bernese Alps.

From Grindelwald and Pfingstegg a trail leads to the hut via Bäregg.
