= Grosser Diamantstock =

Mountain in Switzerland

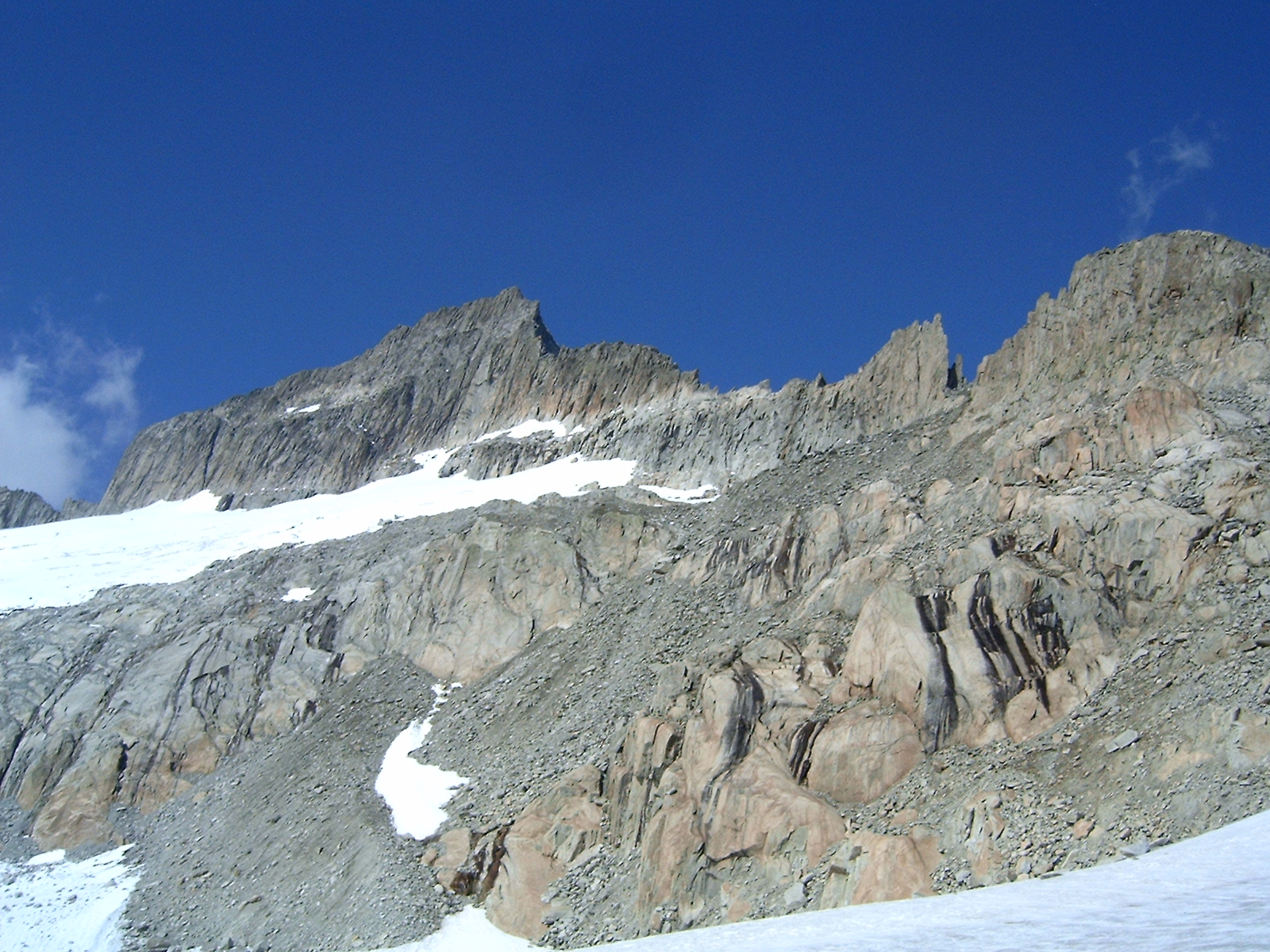
- View from the Bächligletscher (east side)

Highest point
- Elevation: 3,162 m (10,374 ft)
- Prominence: 89 m (292 ft)
- Parent peak: Bächlistock
- Coordinates: 46°35′32.7″N 8°14′35.8″E

Geography
- Location within Switzerland
- Location: Bern, Switzerland
- Parent range: Bernese Alps

The Grosser Diamantstock is a mountain of the Bernese Alps, located west of Handegg in the Bernese Oberland. Its summit has an elevation of 3,162 metres (10,374 ft) above sea level and is the tripoint between the glacier valleys of Hiendertelltigletscher, Bächligletscher and Gruebengletscher.
