= Grünhorn =

Mountain in Switzerland

- Aerial view of the Grünhorn from the southeast

Highest point
- Elevation: 4,043 m (13,264 ft)
- Prominence: 303 m (994 ft)
- Parent peak: Gross Fiescherhorn
- Isolation: 2.5 km (1.6 mi)
- Coordinates: 46°31′54.8″N 8°04′39.8″E

Geography
- Location within Switzerland
- Location: Valais, Switzerland
- Parent range: Bernese Alps

Climbing
- First ascent: 7 August 1865
- Easiest route: Glaciated tour

The Grünhorn (or Gross Grünhorn) (4,043 m) is a mountain in the Bernese Alps range of the Swiss Alps. It is located on the ridge between the two largest glaciers of the Alps: the Aletsch Glacier to the west and the Fiescher Glacier to the east. To the south lies the Gross Wannenhorn and, to the north, the Gross Fiescherhorn.

The starting point for the normal route via the Grünegghorn and the south-west ridge is the Konkordiahütte at 2,850 metres (9,350 ft), which can be reached from Fiesch (1,049 m; 3,442 ft).

== Climbing history ==
The first ascent was made on August 7, 1865 by the Bernese mineralogist Edmund von Fellenberg with guides Peter Michel, Peter Egger and Peter Inäbnit. They climbed the mountain from the west side, starting at the Ewigschneefeld, a tributary glacier of the Aletsch Glacier. They successfully reached the summit despite very bad weather conditions. The same climbers had made an attempt on the peak in the previous year, but they could only reach a lower prominence of the Grünegghorn.

The second ascent was made by W. A. B. Coolidge, with guides Christian and Rudolf Almer (sons of Christian Almer).

A route on the north-east ridge was opened on 26 August 1913 by D. von Bethmann-Hollweg and O. Supersaxo. In the summer of 1950, G. Van der Leck climbed the west face. The western pillar was finally climbed by C. Blum and U. Frei on 27 August 1967.

Famed Swiss mountaineer Erhard Loretan died after a fall on the Grünhorn on 28 April 2011.

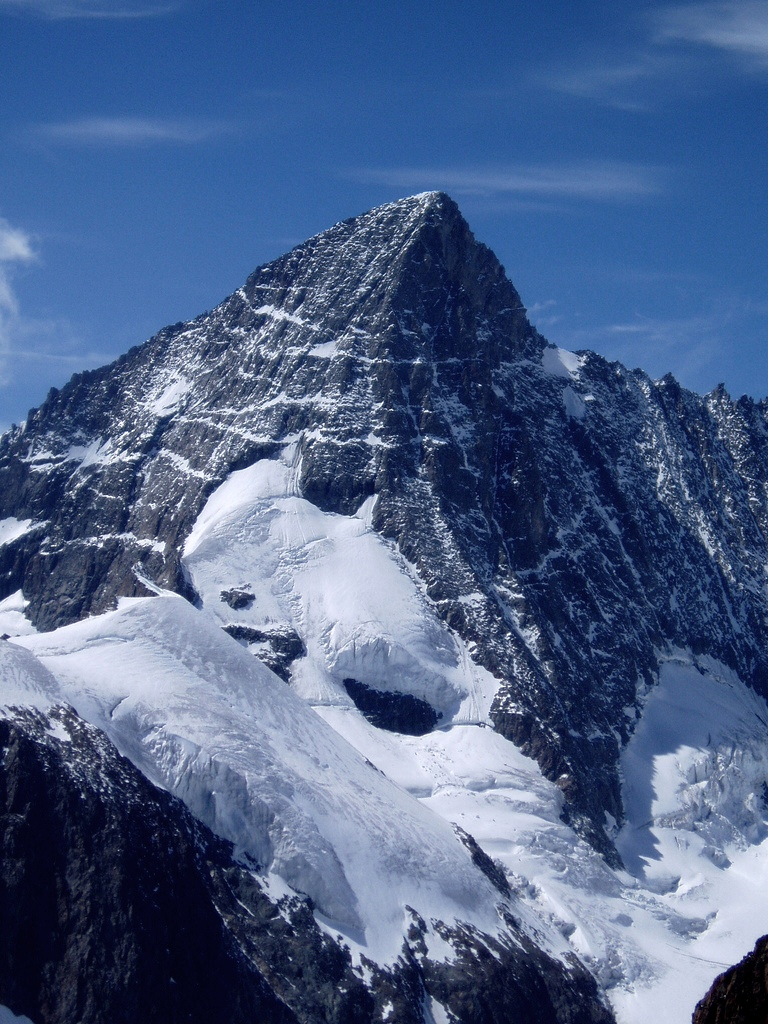
The east side of the Grünhorn, seen from the Finsteraarhorn Hut

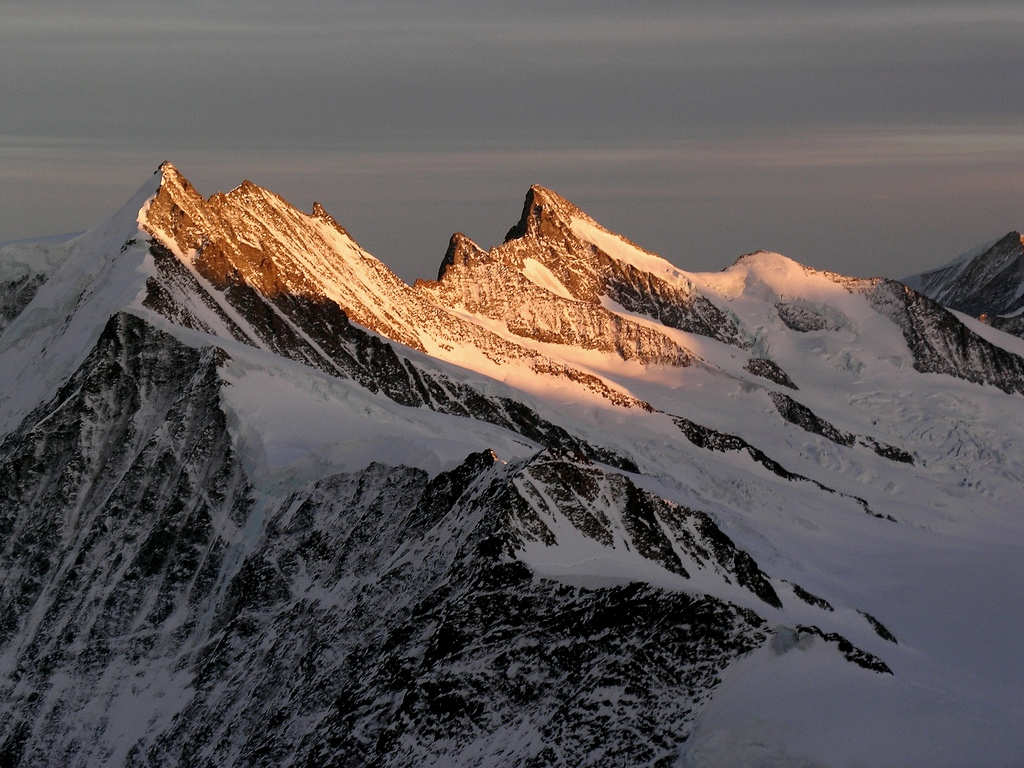
The Grünhorn (centre) from the north

== See also ==
- List of 4000 metre peaks of the Alps
