= Oberaarsee =

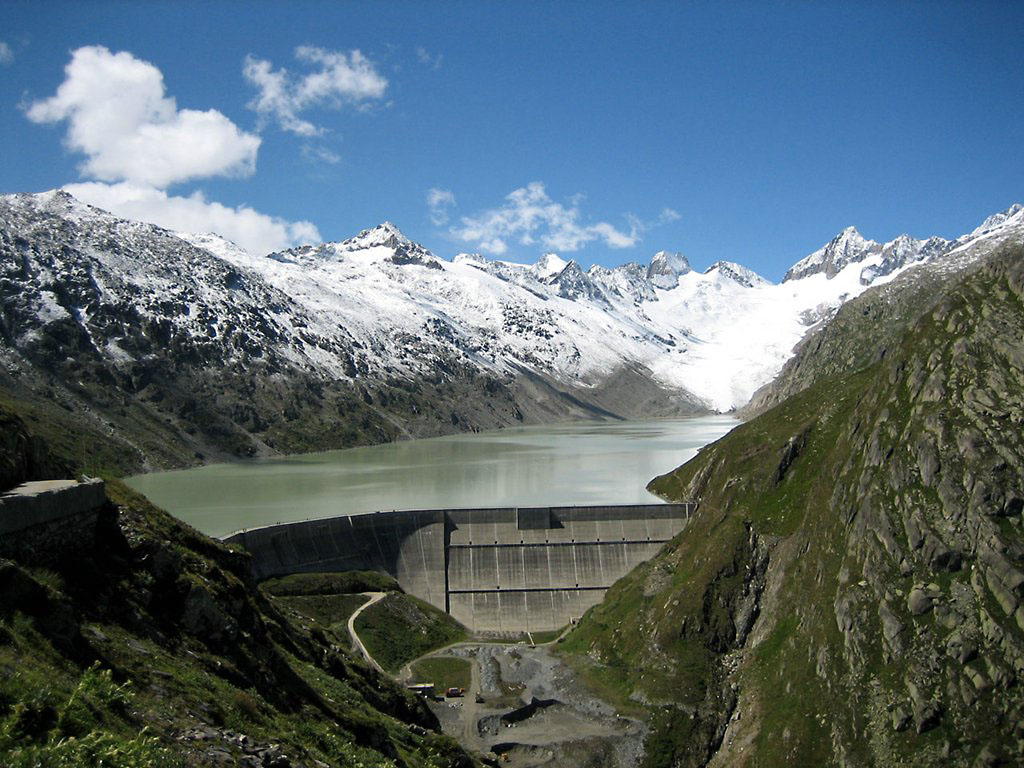

- Location within Canton of Bern Location within Switzerland Location within Alps
- Interactive map of Oberaarsee
- Location: Guttannen, Canton of Bern
- Coordinates: 46°33′N 8°16′E
- Type: reservoir
- Catchment area: 19.4 km^{2} (7.5 sq mi)
- Basin countries: Switzerland
- Max. length: 2.8 km (1.7 mi)
- Surface area: 1.47 km^{2} (0.57 sq mi)
- Max. depth: 90 m (300 ft)
- Surface elevation: 2,303 m (7,556 ft)

Oberaarsee is a hydroelectric reservoir in the Grimsel area, part of the municipality of Guttannen, Switzerland. Its surface area is 1.47 km^{2} (0.57 sq mi). The Oberaar dam was completed in 1953, and is operated by Kraftwerke Oberhasli. It is drained by the Oberaarbach, which flows into the Grimselsee.

The Oberaar glacier is located west of the lake.

== See also ==
- List of lakes of Switzerland
- List of mountain lakes of Switzerland
