= Finsteraarhorn =

Mountain in the Bernese Alps

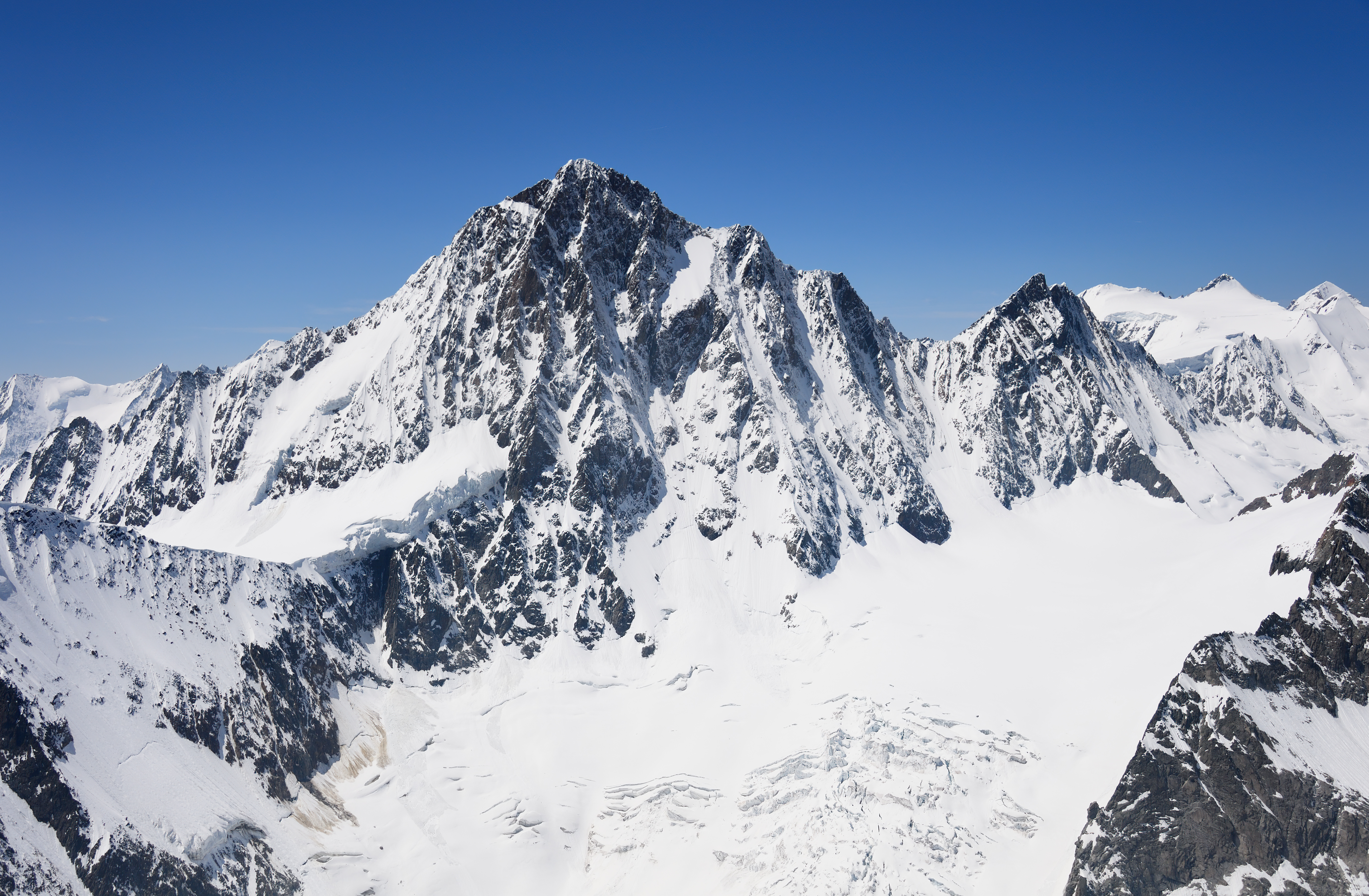
- Aerial view from the east

Highest point
- Elevation: 4,274 m (14,022 ft)
- Prominence: 2279 m ↓ Western Simplon; Ranked 3rd in the Alps
- Parent peak: Nordend (line parent)
- Isolation: 51.7 km → Nadelhorn to Nadelhorn
- Listing: Canton high point Ultra
- Coordinates: 46°32′14.9″N 8°07′33.7″E

Geography
- Location within Switzerland
- Location: Bern/Valais, Switzerland
- Parent range: Bernese Alps
- Topo map: Swisstopo 1249 Finsteraarhorn

Geology
- Mountain type: Amphibolites

Climbing
- First ascent: 10 August 1829 by Jakob Leuthold and Johann Währen
- Easiest route: rock/snow climb

The Finsteraarhorn (4,274 m; 14,022 ft) is a mountain lying on the border between the cantons of Bern and Valais. It is the highest mountain of the Bernese Alps and the most prominent peak of Switzerland. The Finsteraarhorn is the ninth-highest mountain and third-most prominent peak in the Alps. In 2001 the whole massif and surrounding glaciers were designated as part of the Jungfrau-Aletsch World Heritage Site.

== Geography ==
Despite being the most elevated, prominent and isolated mountain of both the Bernese Alps and the canton of Bern, the Finsteraarhorn is less known and frequented than the nearby Jungfrau and Eiger. This is due to its location in one of the most remote areas in the Alps, completely surrounded by uninhabited glacial valleys.

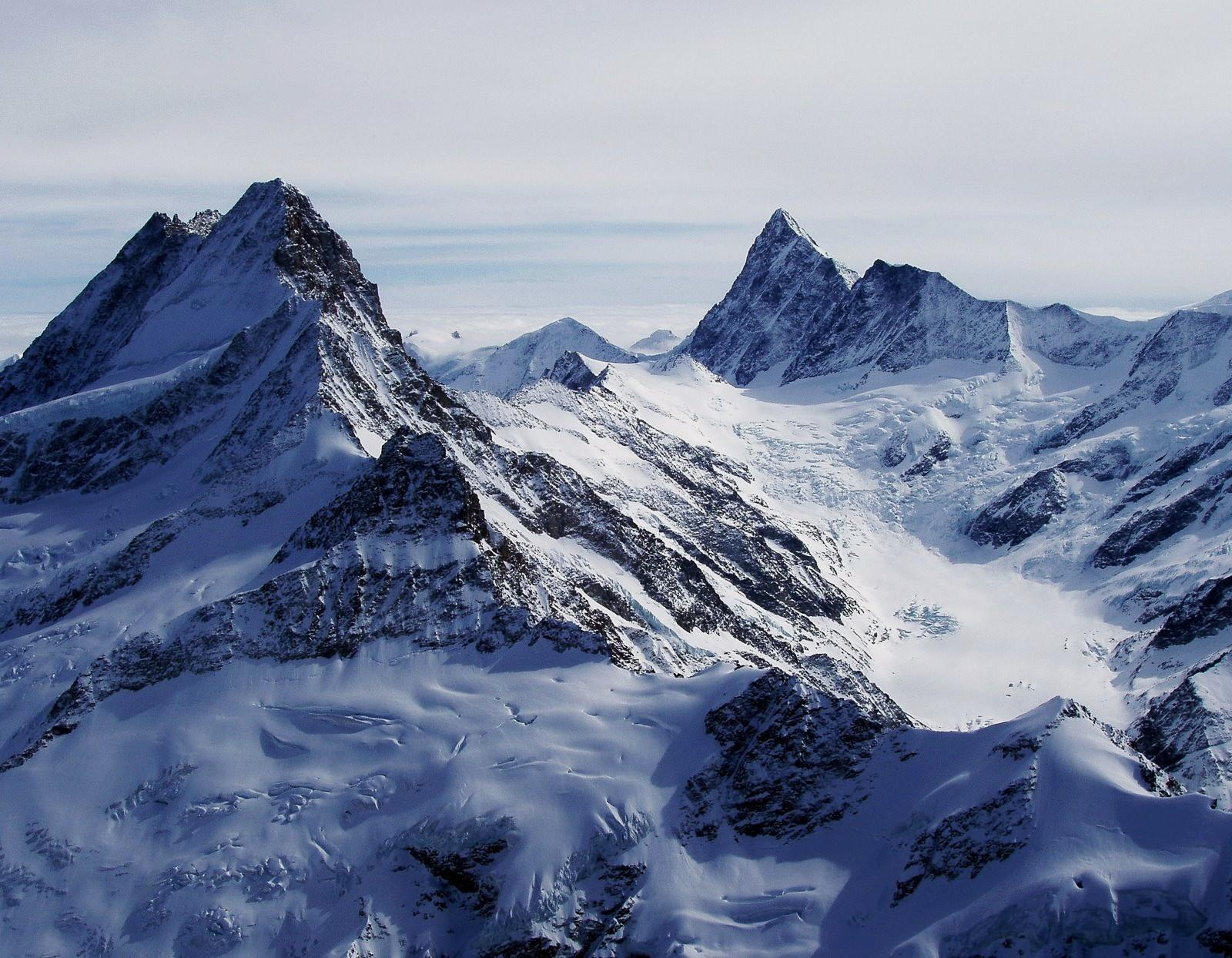
The Schreckhorn and the Finsteraarhorn (right), with the Lower Grindelwald Glacier between them

To its west lies the Fiescher Glacier, the second longest in the Alps, and to the east lie the Great Aar Glaciers. The smaller Lower Grindelwald Glacier lies north of the massif. The Finsteraarhorn is surrounded by the summits of the Schreckhorn and Lauteraarhorn to the north, the Gross Fiescherhorn, Grünhorn and Gross Wannenhorn to the west and the Oberaarhorn to the east.

The summit lies on the border between the cantons of Valais and Bern. Politically, it is split between the municipalities of Fieschertal (Valais) and Guttannen (Bern). The Valais–Bern border is also the watershed between the Rhône (Mediterranean Sea) and Rhine (North Sea) rivers. The Finsteraarhorn is the culminating point of the Rhine drainage basin.

The Finsteraarhorn was dethroned by Monte Rosa as the highest summit of Switzerland when Valais joined the Swiss Confederation in 1815.

== Geology ==
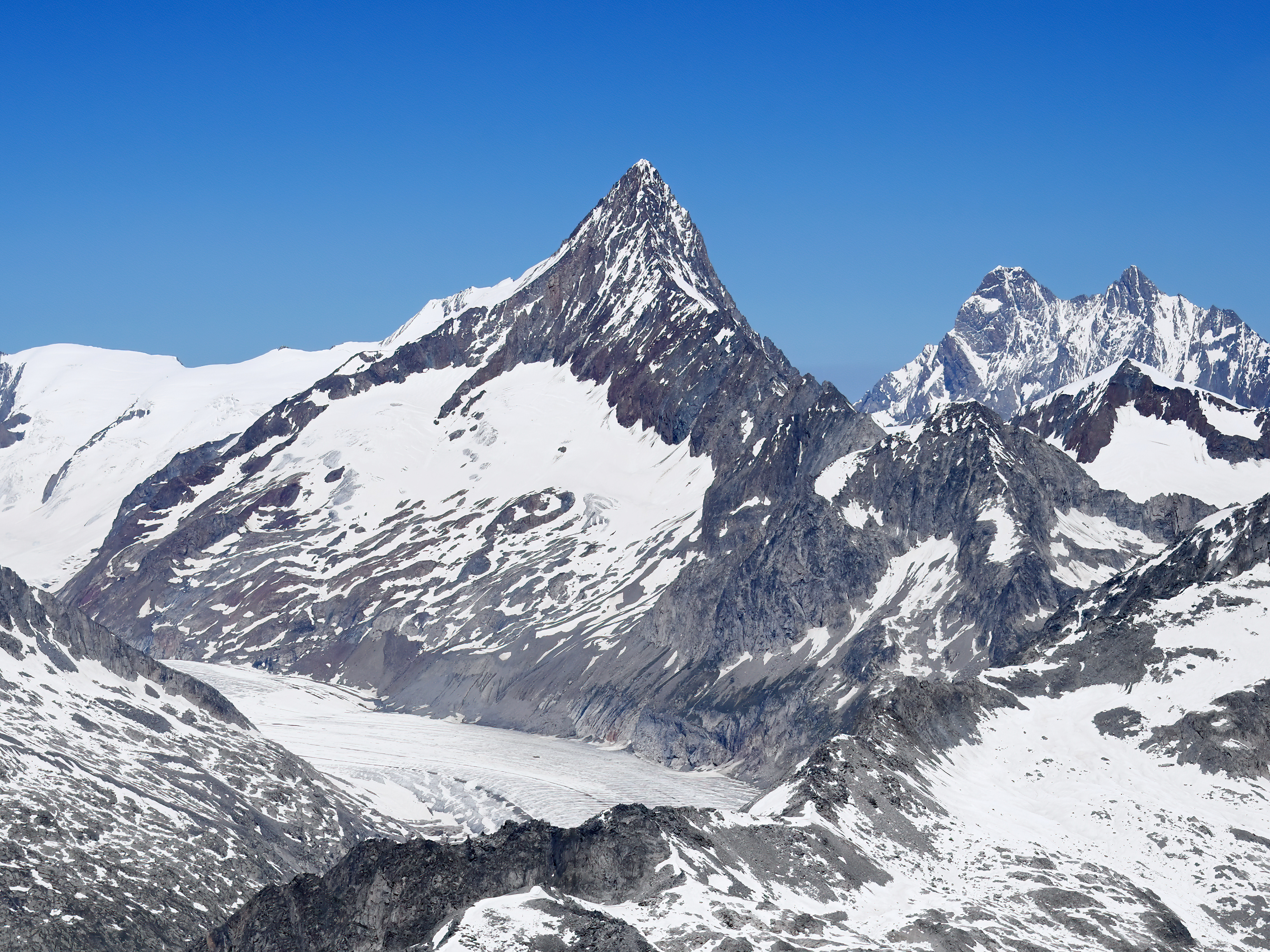
Aerial view from the south

The Finsteraarhorn is the culminating point of the Aarmassif, a geologic crystalline massif which crops out in the eastern Bernese Alps and Urner Alps. The massif belongs to the Helvetic zone and consists of rocks from the European continent, mainly granites and gneisses. The summit itself is composed of amphibolites.

The tectonic uplift of the massif occurred late in the alpine orogeny, during the Oligocene, 30 to 40 million years ago. The inelastic deformation of rocks led to many fractures and formation of hydrothermal crystals by the deposition of the saturated water flowing inside.

== Climbing history ==
=== Controversial first ascent ===
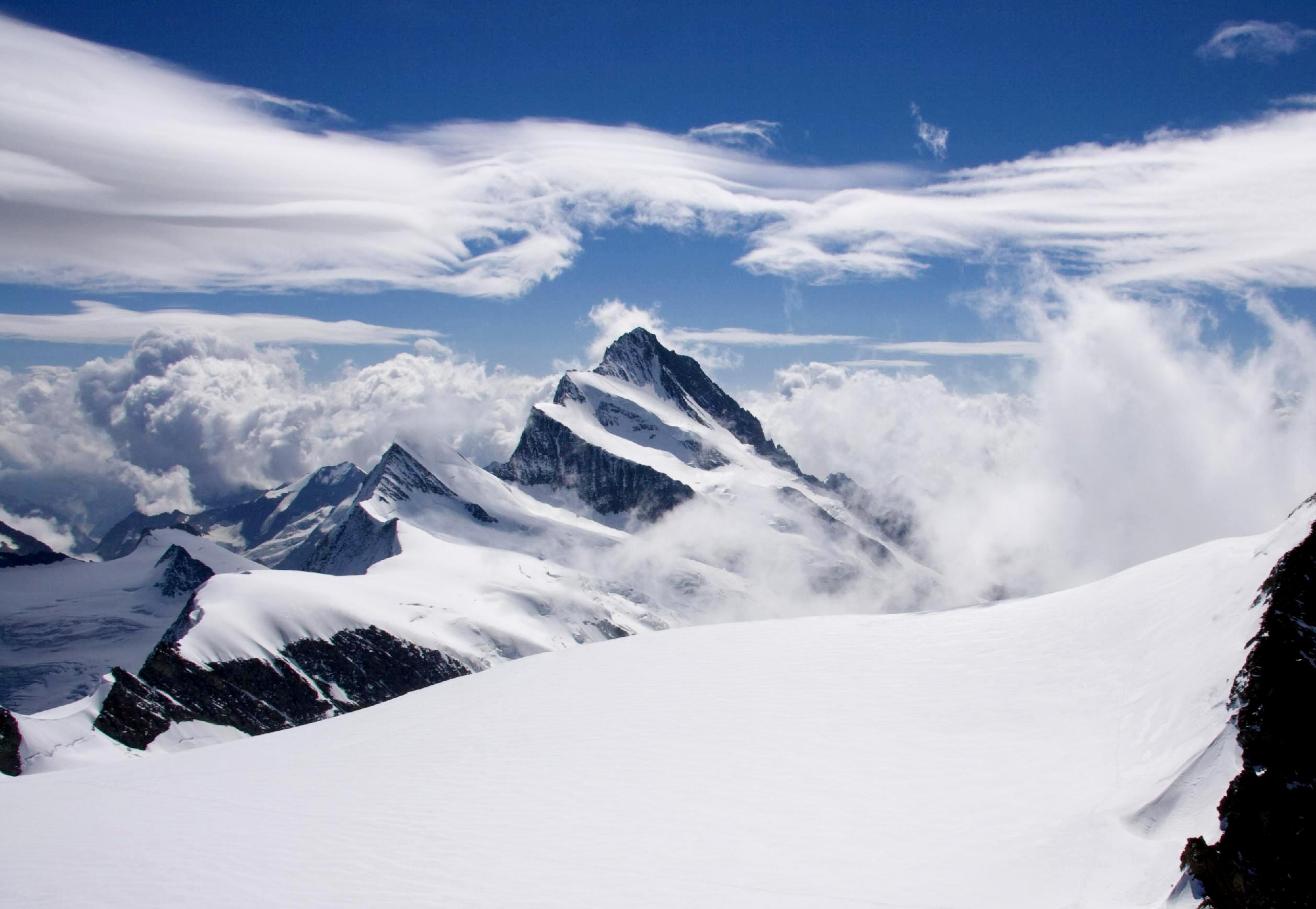
View from the west. The Hugisattel lies just below the summit on the left

The first ascent was long a controversial matter. The first attempt was made on 16 August 1812 by the Aargau merchant Rudolph Meyer, guided by the locals Kaspar Huber, Arnold Abbühl, Joseph Bortes and Aloys Volker. Bortes and Volker, guiding Meyer's father and uncle, had been the first to climb the Jungfrau the previous year. They approached the mountain via the Oberaarjoch, Studer glacier, and south-east ridge, which is a more difficult and longer route than the current normal route over the north-west ridge. Meyer became exhausted and remained behind after reaching the ridge, perhaps near P. 3883 (Meyer's Peak). Huber kept him company, while the three other guides went on and purportedly reached the summit after three hours.

On 19 August 1828, Franz Joseph Hugi, a geologist from Solothurn, made another attempt with seven local climbers. Among these was Arnold Abbühl, who told Hugi about his ascent 16 years earlier, but Hugi scoffingly dismissed his account, partly because Abbühl misidentified the peak in the beginning of their approach. The group reached a ca. 4,080-metre (13,390-foot) saddle (the Hugisattel) on the north-west ridge, but had to retreat because of bad weather after Hugi and one of the guides (Arnold Dändler) nearly had fallen off the ridge.

The next year Hugi organized another expedition via the same route. While an attempt on the 3rd of August faltered, on 10 August 1829 two of his guides, Jakob Leuthold and Johann Währen were able to reach the summit, where they spent three hours building a 7-foot pyramid to anchor a flagpole. Hugi stayed behind somewhat above the saddle not daring to cross a steep slope, partly because he had twisted an ankle four weeks earlier. On the way back Hugi's ankle played up and Leuthold, Währen and Joseph Zemt took turns carrying him down the glacier. Hugi's account makes no mention of evidence of an earlier ascent.

In articles of 1881 and 1908, the mountaineers and leading historians of Alpine exploration Gottlieb Studer and W.A.B. Coolidge, respectively, declared to be convinced that the Meyer expedition had been successful. However, John Percy Farrar concluded in 1913 in an article in the Alpine Journal that the guides in 1812 must have reached the 4,167 m high shoulder 200 m south of the true summit, which he considered nevertheless a feat half a century ahead of its time.

=== Other ascents ===
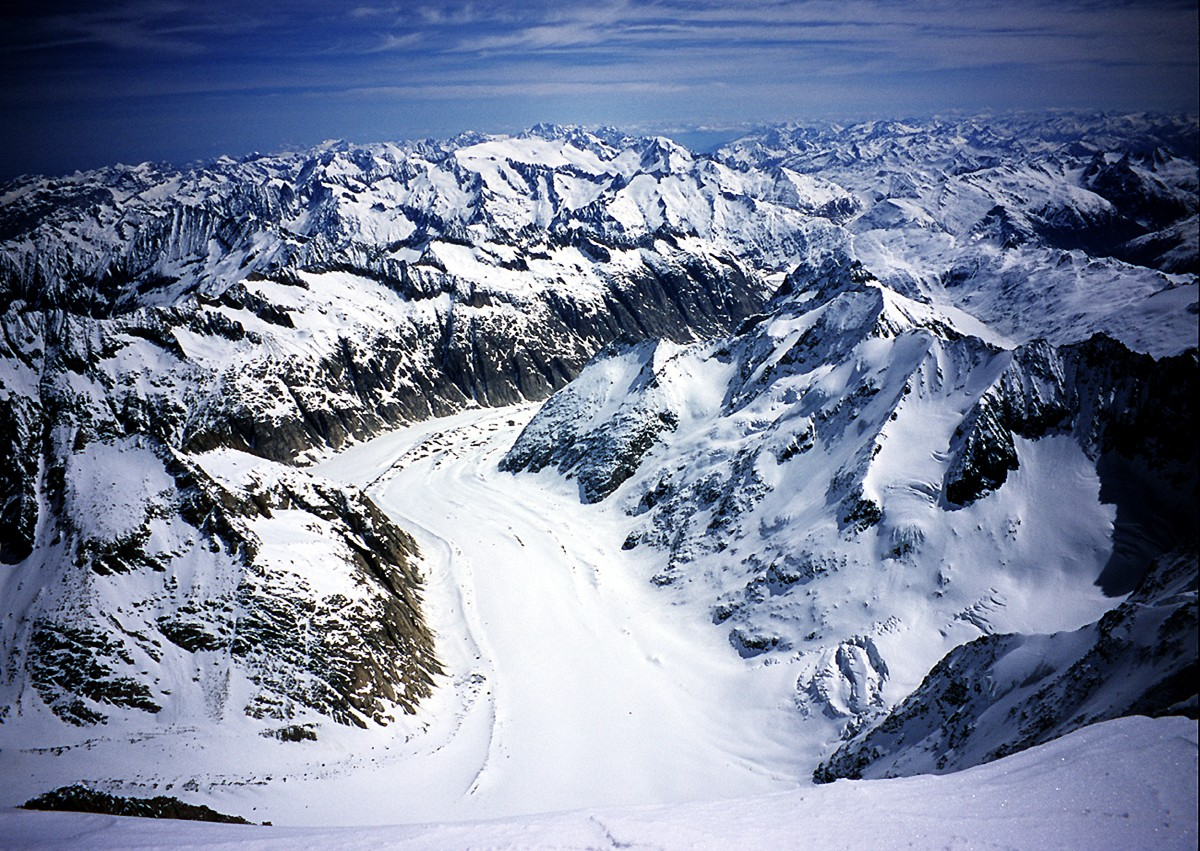
View over the Finsteraar Glacier from the summit

The fifth ascent took place on August 13, 1857. It was the first British ascent, made by John Frederick Hardy, William Mathews, Benjamin St John Attwood-Mathews, John Clough Williams-Ellis and Edward Shirley Kennedy, accompanied by the guides Auguste Simond and Jean Baptiste Croz from Chamonix, Johann Jaun the Elder from Meiringen, Aloys Bortis from Fiesch and the porter Alexander Guntern from Biel in Goms. They left Konkordiaplatz at 2:30 pm, reaching the summit at exactly 11:53 pm. Before ascending the mountain, Mathews already mentioned his idea of a club for alpinists. On the summit of the Finsteraarhorn the climbers decided to found such an association, which would be named the Alpine Club.

In 1881 Frederick Gardiner with Charles and Lawrence Pilkington made the first guideless ascent.

The most difficult route to the summit, the north-east face, was opened on 16 July 1904 by G. Hasler and his guide F. Amatter. The ascent marked the beginning of the épopée of the great north faces in the Bernese Alps. In fact the north-east face of the Finsteraarhorn was climbed only 11 times between 1904 and 1977. A third ascent was made on 3 September 1930 by Miriam O'Brien Underhill with guides A. and F. Rubi. She relates this dangerous ascent in her book Give Me the Hills.

== Climbing routes ==
Aerial view of the Finsteraarhorn from the west, with the Agassiz ridge to the left of the summit; the Agassizjoch can be seen near the left edge of the image

The normal route starts at the Finsteraarhorn Hut (3,046 m) and goes over the south-west flank of the mountain up to the Hugisattel, then follows the north-west rocky ridge to the summit.

Routes	Start	Time of ascent	Difficulty
Normal route	Finsteraarhorn Hut	4–5 hours	PD
North-west ridge (Agassiz ridge)	Finsteraarhorn Hut	3–4 hours from the Agassizjoch	AD
South-east ridge	Oberaarjoch Hut	14–15 hours	D
East face	Oberaarjoch Hut	8–10 hours from the Studerjoch	TD

== See also ==
- List of mountains of the Alps over 4000 metres
