= Lauteraarhorn =

Mountain in the Swiss Alps

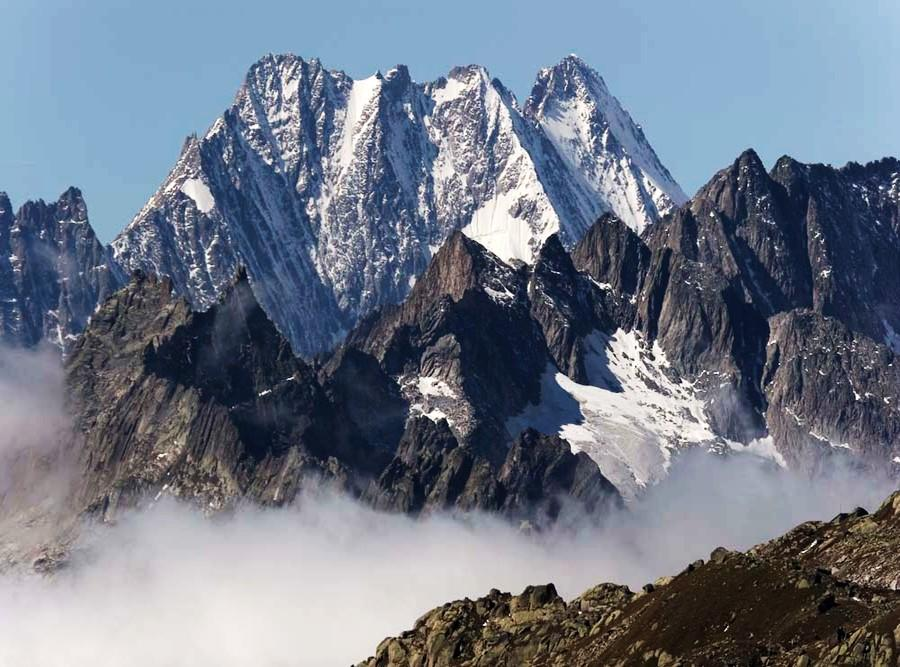
- The Lauteraarhorn (centre-left) and the Schreckhorn (center-right) seen from the east

Highest point
- Elevation: 4,042 m (13,261 ft)
- Prominence: 128 m (420 ft)
- Parent peak: Schreckhorn
- Isolation: 1.0 km (0.62 mi)
- Coordinates: 46°35′00.2″N 8°07′42.3″E

Geography
- Location within Switzerland
- Location: Canton of Bern, Switzerland
- Parent range: Bernese Alps

Climbing
- First ascent: 8 August 1842 by Pierre Jean Édouard Desor, Christian Girard, Arnold Escher von der Linth with guides Melchior Bannholzer and Jakob Leuthold
- Easiest route: rock/snow climb

The Lauteraarhorn is a peak (4,042 m) of the Bernese Alps, located in the canton of Bern. Together with the higher Schreckhorn, to which it is connected by a high ridge, it lies between the valleys of the Lower Grindelwald Glacier and the Unteraar Glacier, about 10 kilometres southeast of Grindelwald, the closest locality. The Lauteraarhorn belongs to the Aaremassif and is surrounded by large glaciers: the Lauteraargletscher and the Strahlegg-Gletscher (both feeders of the Unteraar Glacier) and the Obers Ischmeer (tributary of the Grindelwald Glacier). Being off the main ridge of the Bernese Alps, all the glaciers surrounding the Lauteraarhorn and the Schreckhorn are part of the Aare basin. The Lauteraarhorn is the second highest summit (after the Schreckhorn) lying wholly within the canton of Bern. Administratively, it is split between the municipalities of Grindelwald and Guttannen.

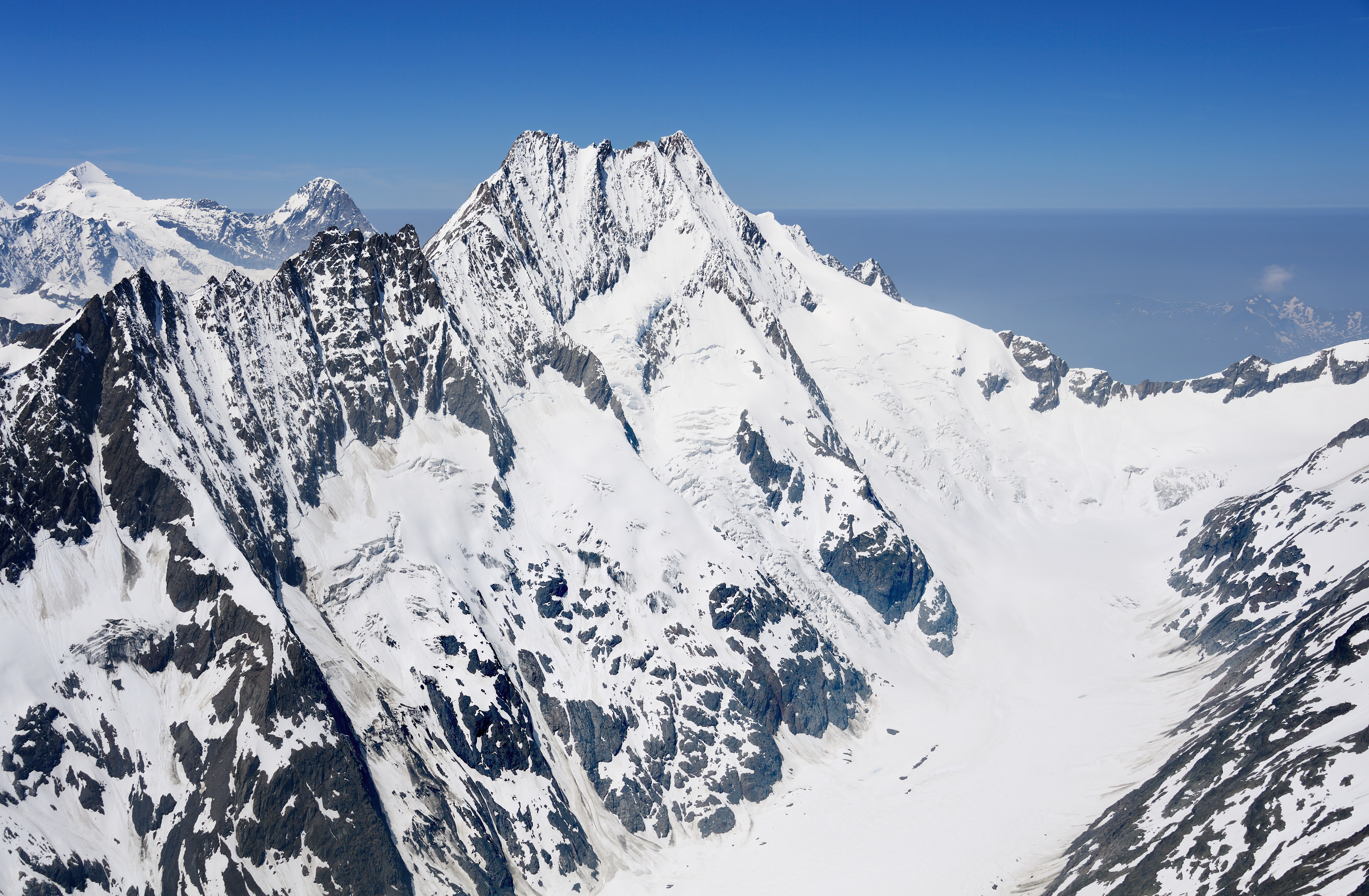
Lauteraarhorn (left) Schreckhorn (right) above the Lauteraar Glacier (bottom right)

The Lauteraarhorn includes two unnamed but noticeable subsidiary summits: the north summit (4,015 m) and the central summit (4,014 m), both having a topographic prominence of over 30 metres. The main summit is the southernmost one and has a modest topographic prominence of 128 metres, due to the high elevation of the ridge (the Schrecksattel) connecting it to the slightly higher Schreckhorn. Only the main summit of the Lauteraarhorn (together with the adjoining Schreckhorn) is on the UIAA list of Alpine four-thousanders.

The first ascent was on 8 August 1842 by Pierre Jean Édouard Desor, Christian Girard, Arnold Escher von der Linth with the guides Melchior Bannholzer and Jakob Leuthold.

== See also ==
- List of 4000 metre peaks of the Alps
