= Unteraargletscher =

Glacier in Switzerland

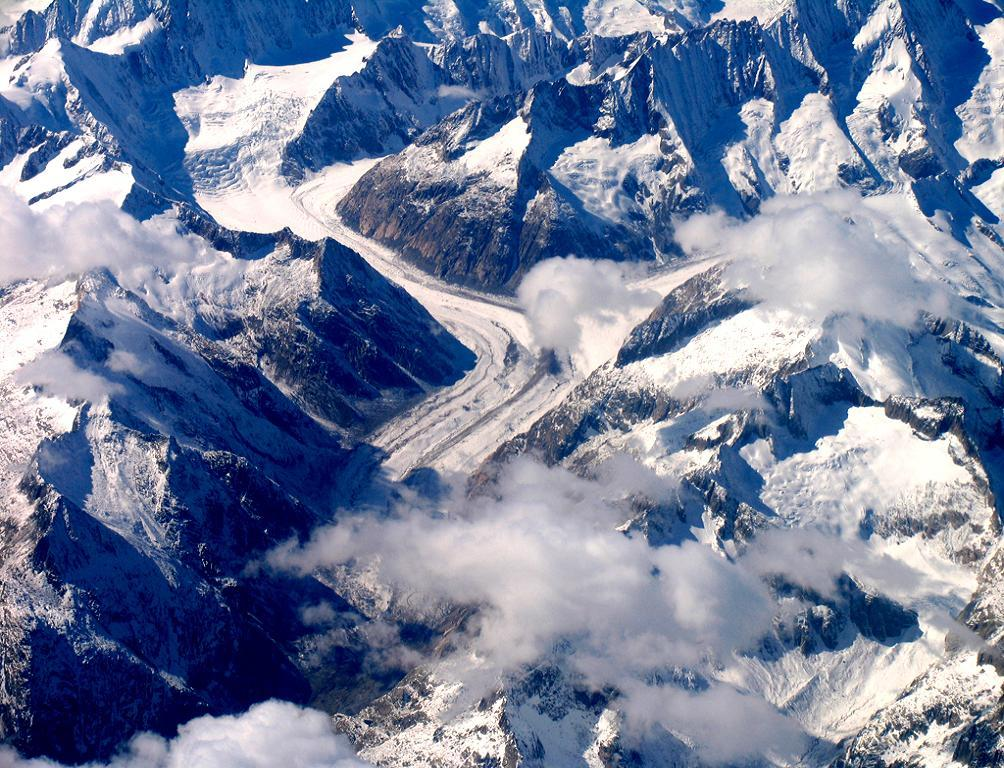
- Aerial view from the east

- Location within Switzerland Location within Alps
- Interactive map of Unteraargletscher
- Location: Bern, Switzerland
- Coordinates: 46°34′0″N 8°13′0″E
- Length: 13 km (8.1 mi)

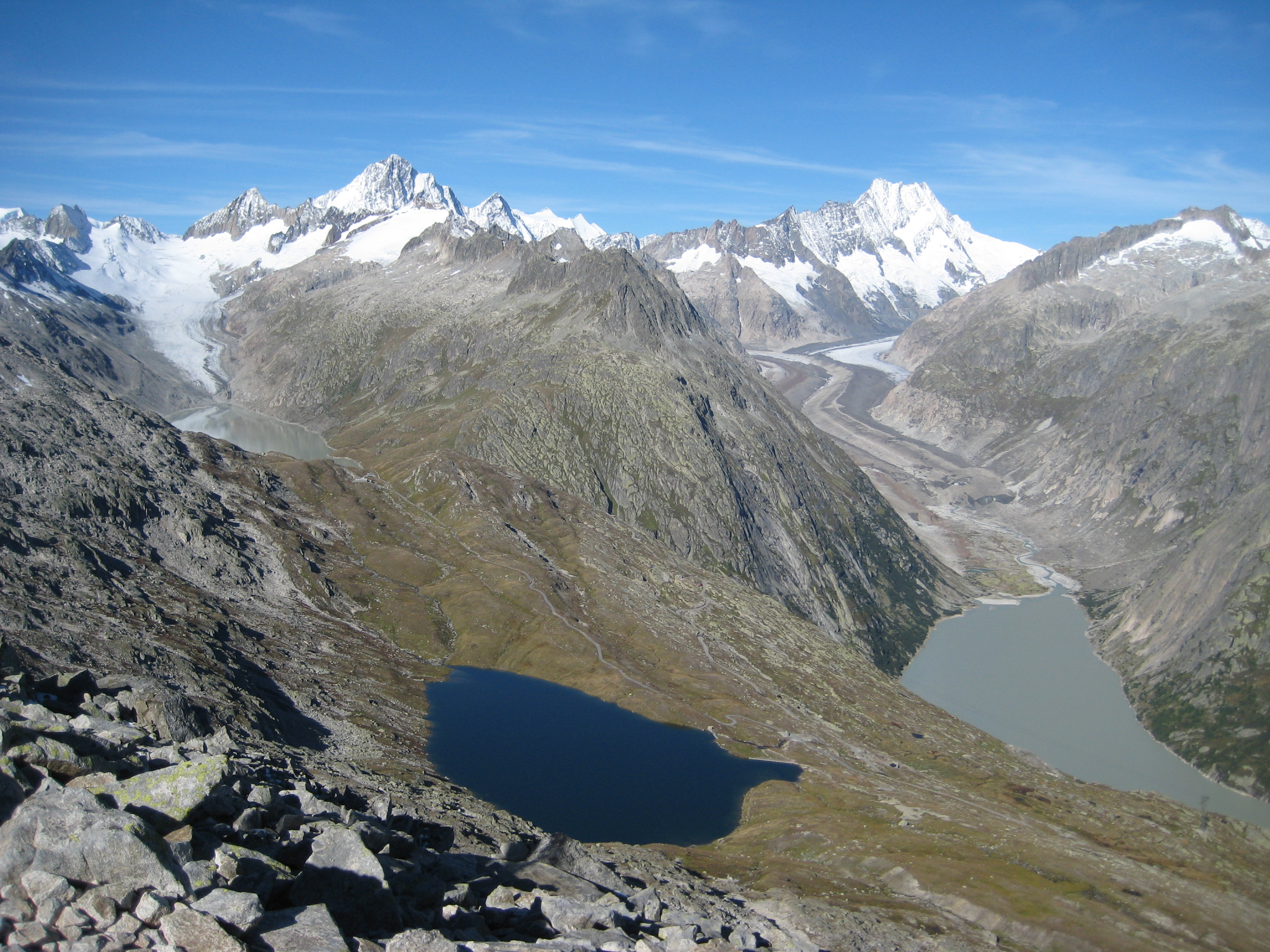
Oberaargletscher (left hand in the background) and Unteraargletscher (on the right). The small blue lake left hand in front is the Triebtenseewli.

The Unteraargletscher (German: [ˈʊntəraːrˌglɛtʃər]), literally "Lower Aare-Glacier", is the larger of the two sources of the Aare river in the Bernese Alps. It emerges from the association of the Finsteraargletscher (near the Finsteraarhorn) and the Lauteraargletscher (near the Lauteraarhorn) and flows for about 6 km (3.7 mi) to the east down to the Grimselsee near the Grimsel Pass. In total the glacier was 12.95 km (8.05 mi) long and 29.48 km^{2} (11.38 sq mi) in area in 1973. Its lower end is (or was) almost 400 metres lower than that of the neighbouring Oberaargletscher.

In the 18th and 19th centuries, it was one of the first subjects of developing glaciology.

== See also ==
- List of glaciers in Switzerland
- List of glaciers
- Retreat of glaciers since 1850
- Swiss Alps
- Rhône Glacier
