= Oberaargletscher =

Glacier in Switzerland

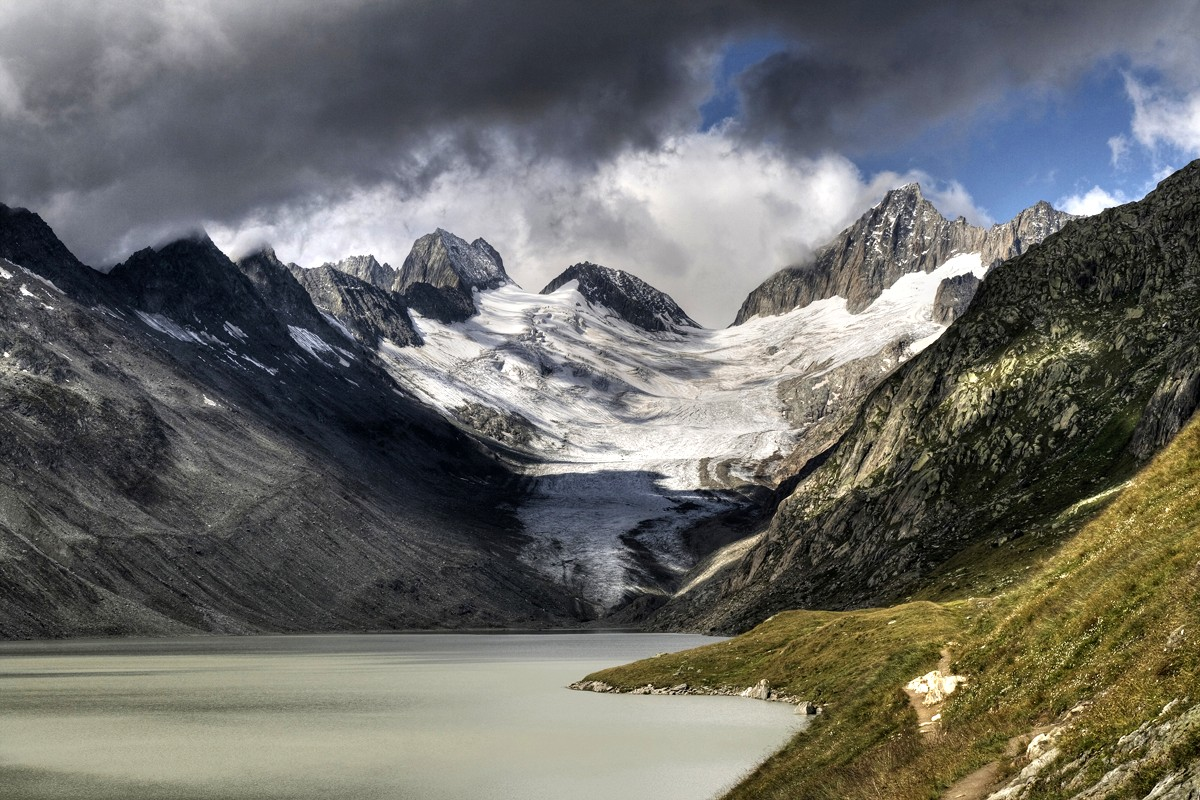
- Oberaarsee and Oberaargletscher

- Location within Switzerland Location within Alps
- Interactive map of Oberaargletscher
- Location: Bern, Switzerland
- Coordinates: 46°31′59″N 8°12′37″E
- Length: 4 km (2.5 mi)

The Oberaargletscher (German: [ˈoːbəraːrˌglɛtʃər]), literally "Upper Aare-Glacier", is a 4 km (2.5 mi) long glacier (2005) situated in the Bernese Alps in the canton of Bern in Switzerland. In 1973 it had an area of 5.82 km^{2} (2.25 sq mi). The lower end of this glacier lies almost 400 m higher than the (original) lower end of neighbouring Unteraargletscher.

== Gallery ==
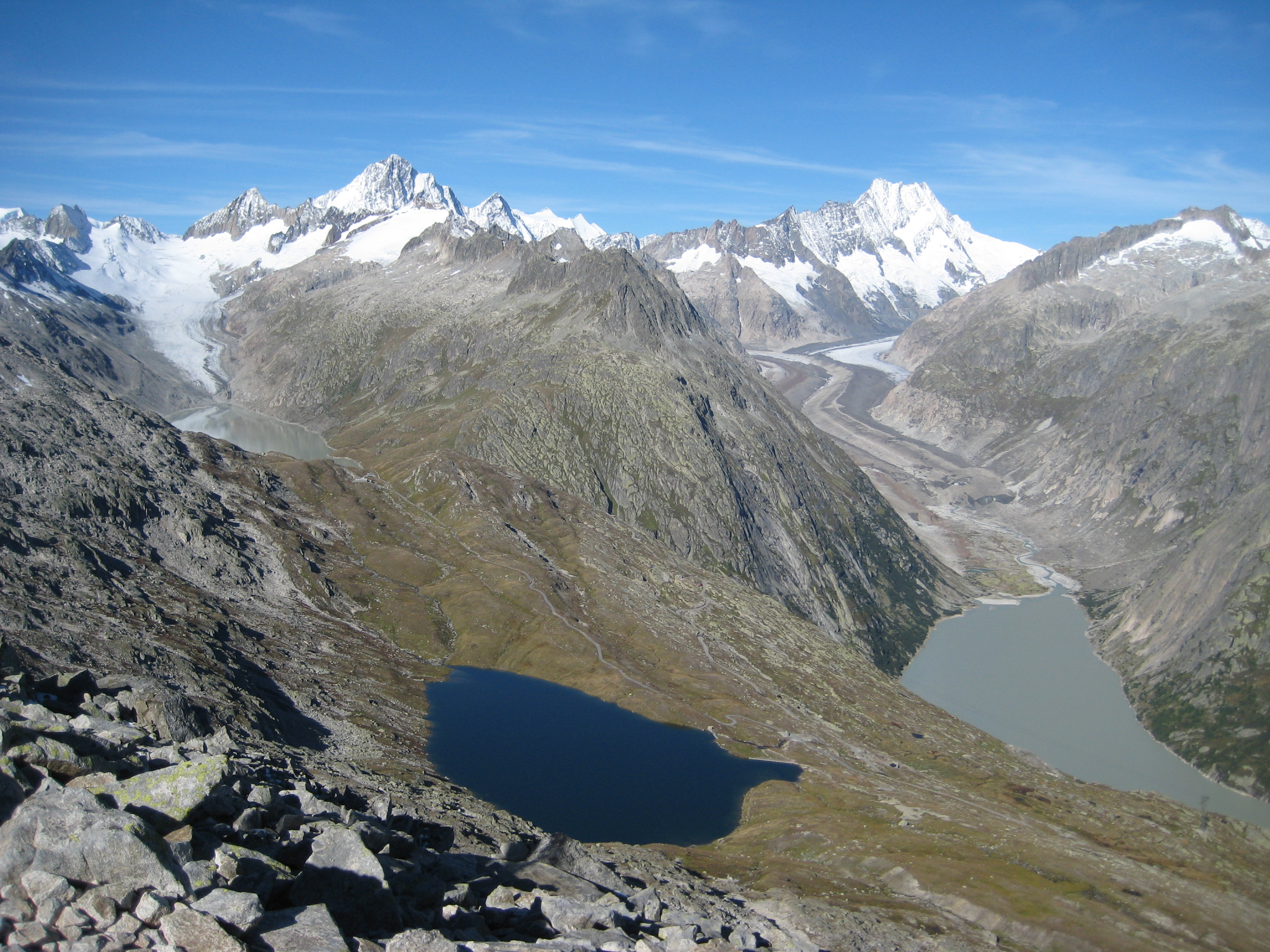
Oberaargletscher (left hand in the background) and Unteraargletscher (on the right). The small blue lake left hand in front is the Triebtenseewli.

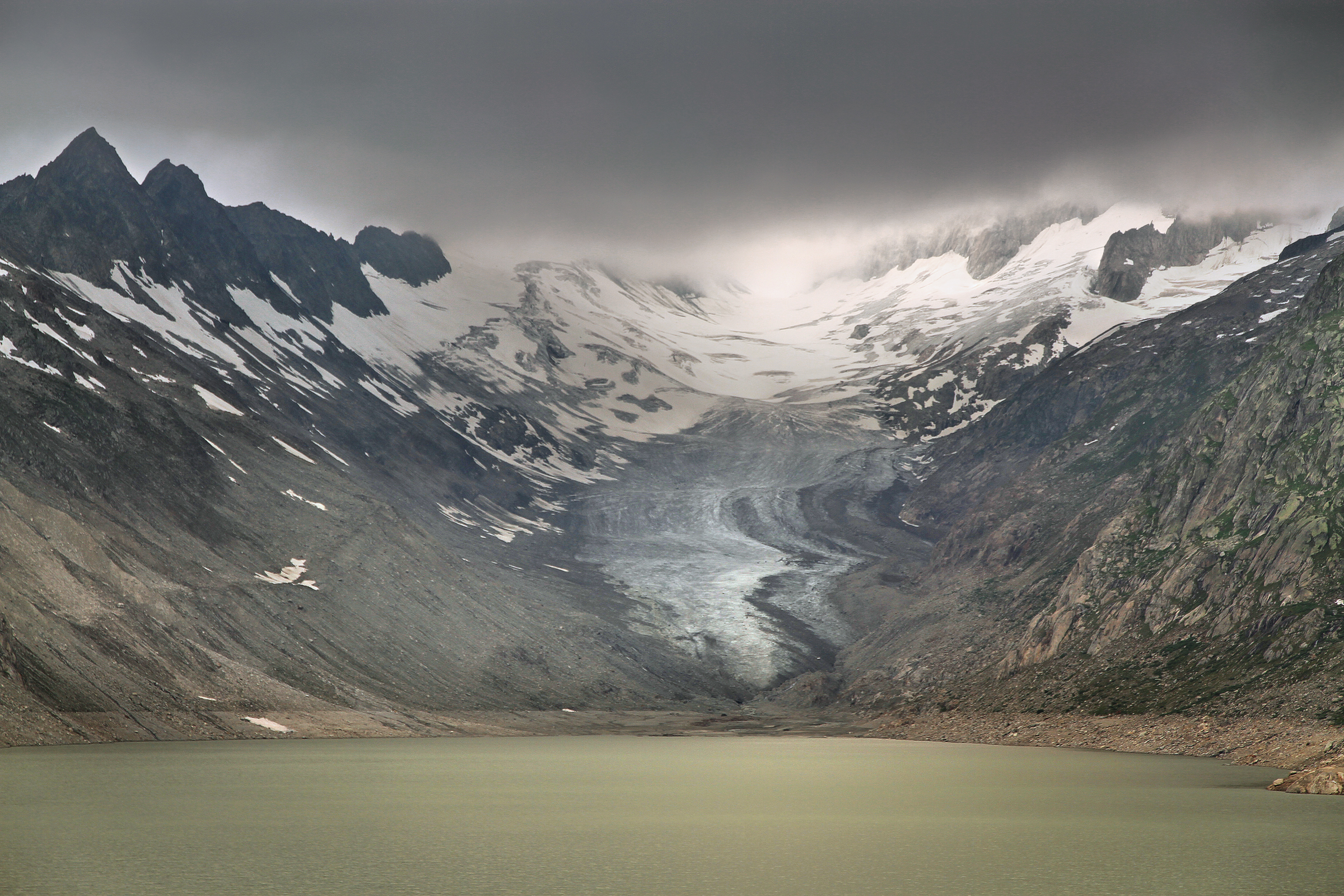
Upper Aargletscher as seen from the bank of the reserve lake Oberaarsee in July, 2010

== See also ==
- List of glaciers in Switzerland
- List of glaciers
- Retreat of glaciers since 1850
- Swiss Alps
- Rhône Glacier
