= Fiescher Glacier =

Glacier in Switzerland

- Fieschergletscher
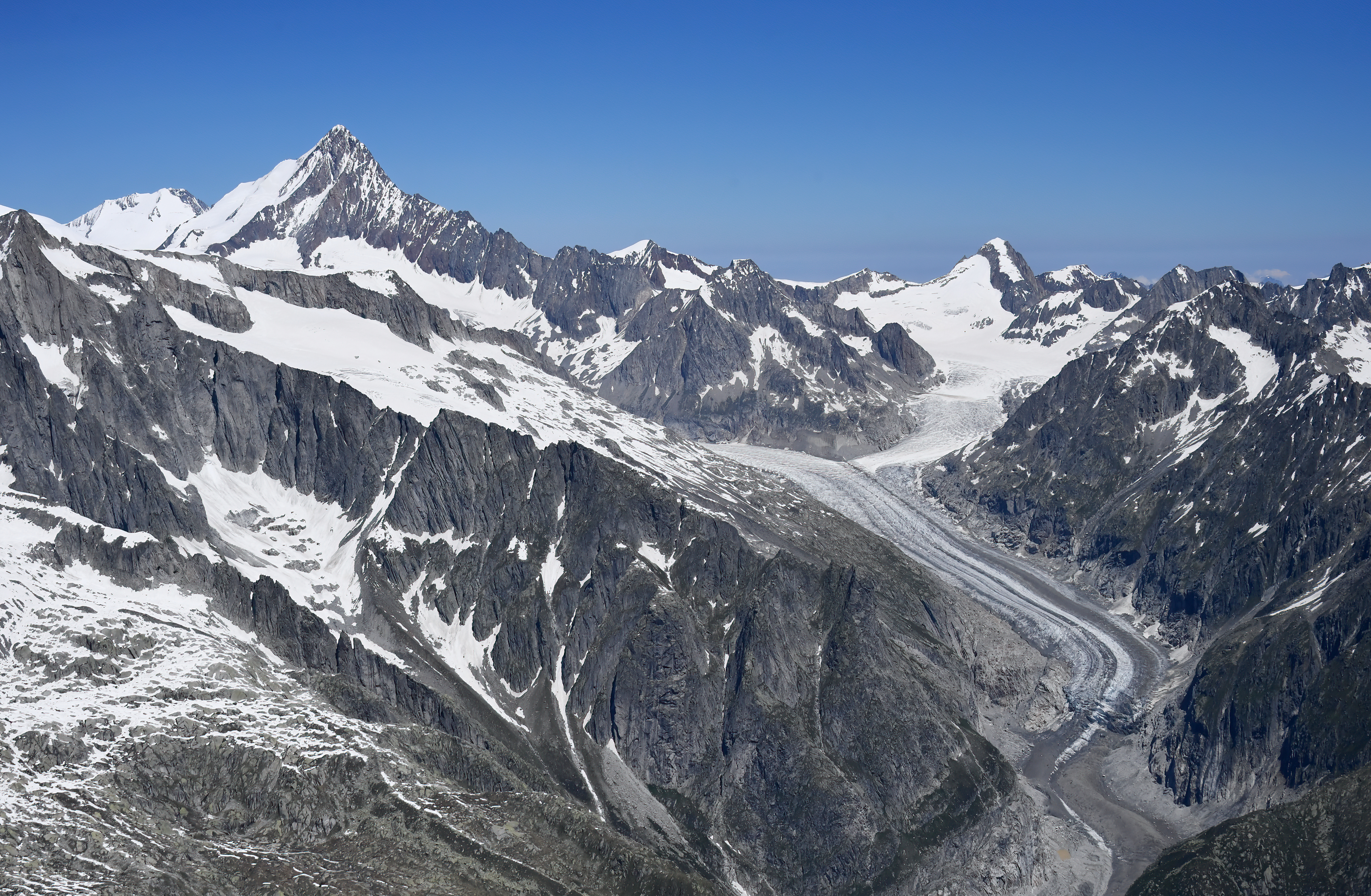
- The lower part of the glacier

- Location within Switzerland Location within Alps
- Interactive map of Fiescher Glacier
- Type: Vallety glacier
- Location: Valais, Switzerland
- Coordinates: 46°29′52″N 8°8′48″E
- Area: 33 km^{2} (13 sq mi)
- Length: 16 km (9.9 mi)

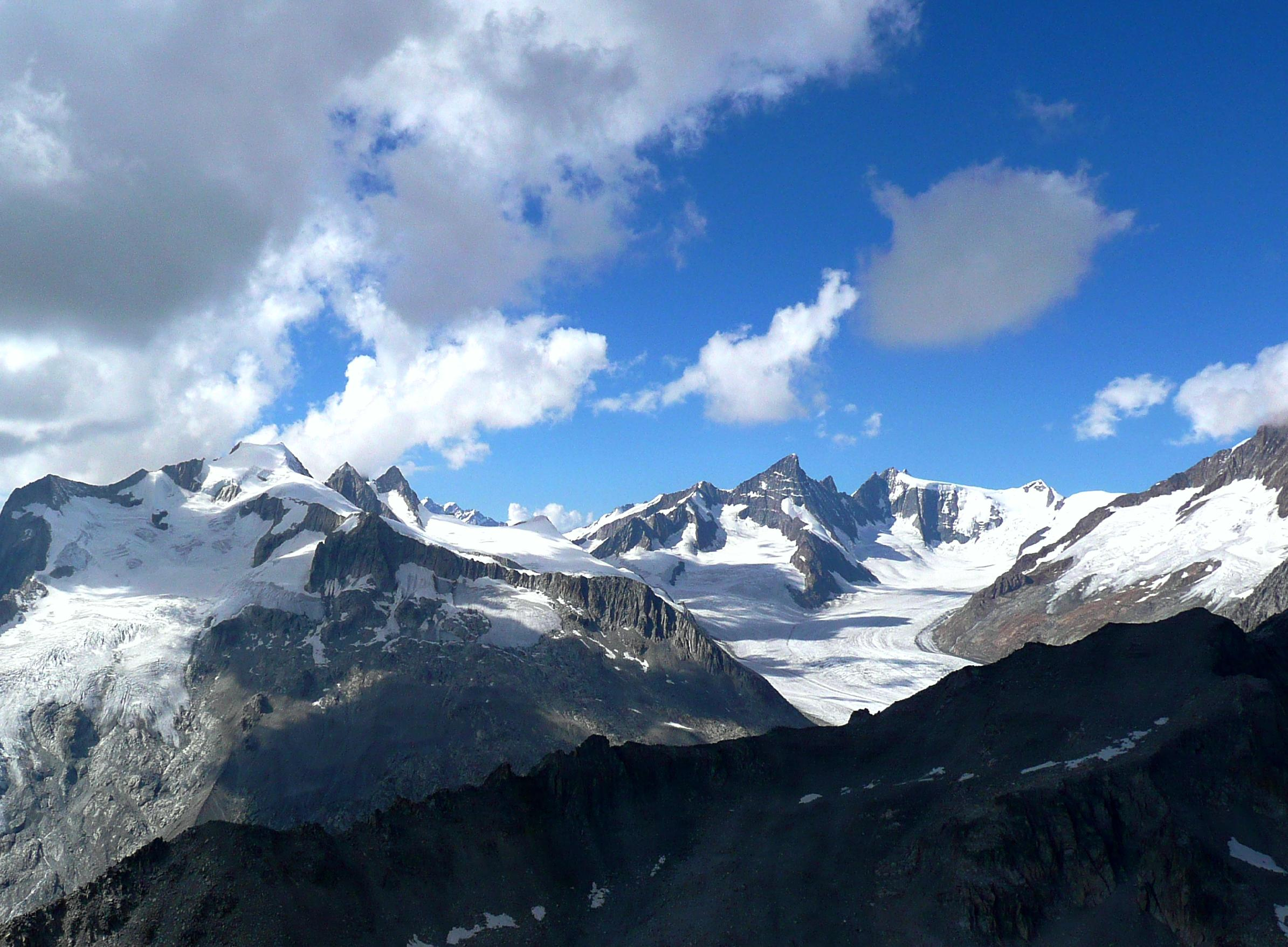
The upper part of the glacier

The Fiescher Glacier (Fieschergletscher in German) is a valley glacier on the south side of the Bernese Alps in the canton of Valais, Switzerland. 16 km (9.9 mi) in length, it is the second longest glacier in the Alps. The glacier covers an area of 33 km^{2} (13 sq mi).

The starting point of the Fiescher Glacier is 4,000 m (13,000 ft) above sea level, on the eastern slope of the Fiescherhorn, it is flanked to the west by the Grünhorn and Gross Wannenhorn and to the east by the Finsteraarhorn.

In the lower section, the Fiescher Glacier flows south through a deep valley between the Gross Wannenhorn and the Wasenhorn. In summer, when the snow layer melts, it has a grey colour as it is covered with rocks coming from the steep slopes of the mountains around. The end of glacier tongue is at around 1,700 m (5,600 ft) above sea level.

On the south western slope of the Finsteraarhorn, about 100 m (330 ft) above the Fieschergletscher, the Finsteraarhornhütte of the Swiss Alpine Club (3,048 m (10,000 ft) above sea level) is often used as an intermediate station on the route from Lötschental or Jungfraujoch to the Grimsel Pass.

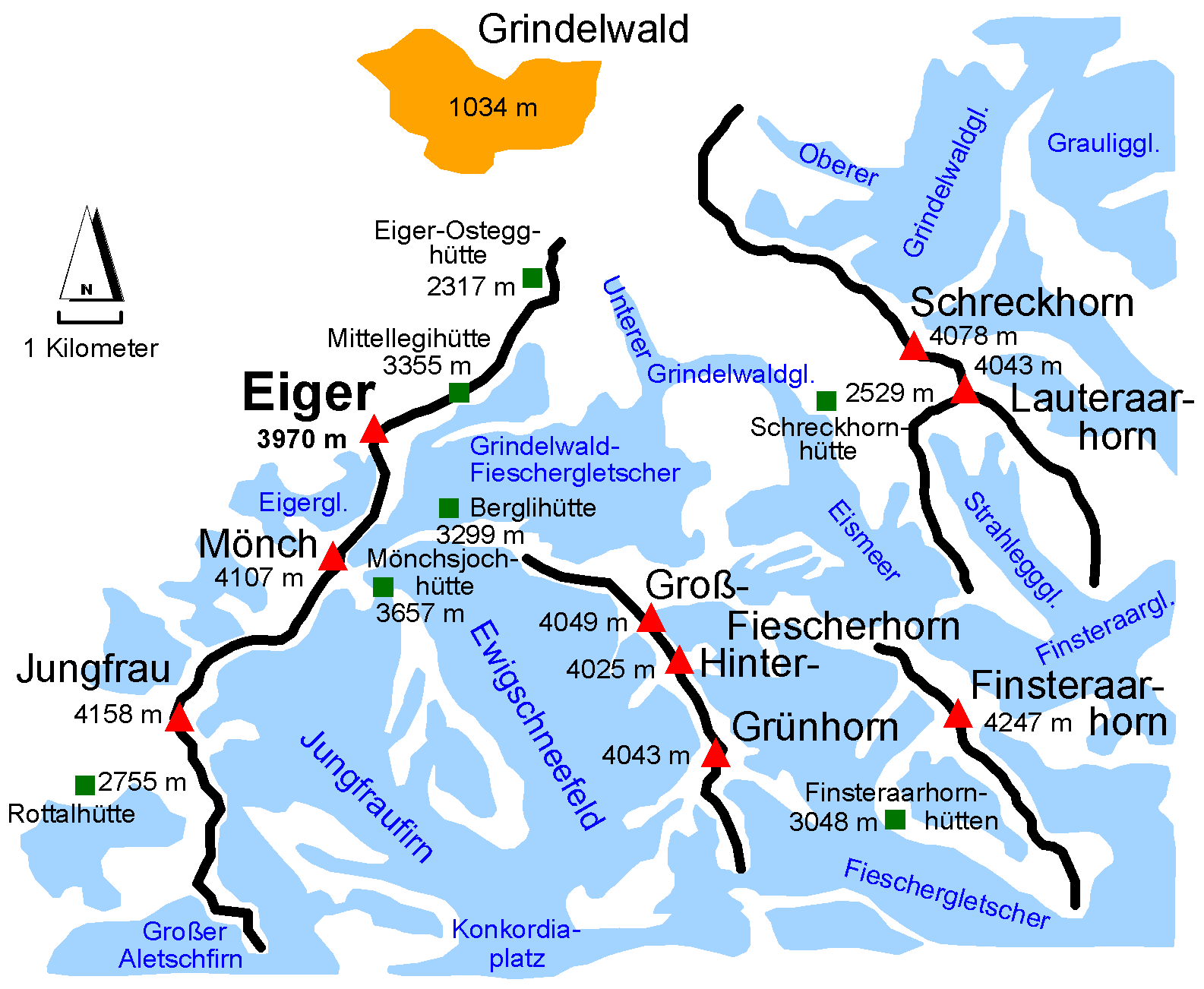
This map shows the Fieschergletscher at the lower right with the Finsteraarhornhütte just above, and the Grindelwald-Fieschergletscher in the middle.

This glacier is not to be confused with the like-named Grindelwald-Fieschergletscher on the north of the Fiescherhörner located near Grindelwald.

== See also ==
- List of glaciers in Switzerland
- List of glaciers
- Retreat of glaciers since 1850
- Swiss Alps
