= Gemmi Fault =

Geologic fault in Switzerland

Coordinates: 46°24′03″N 07°36′01″E

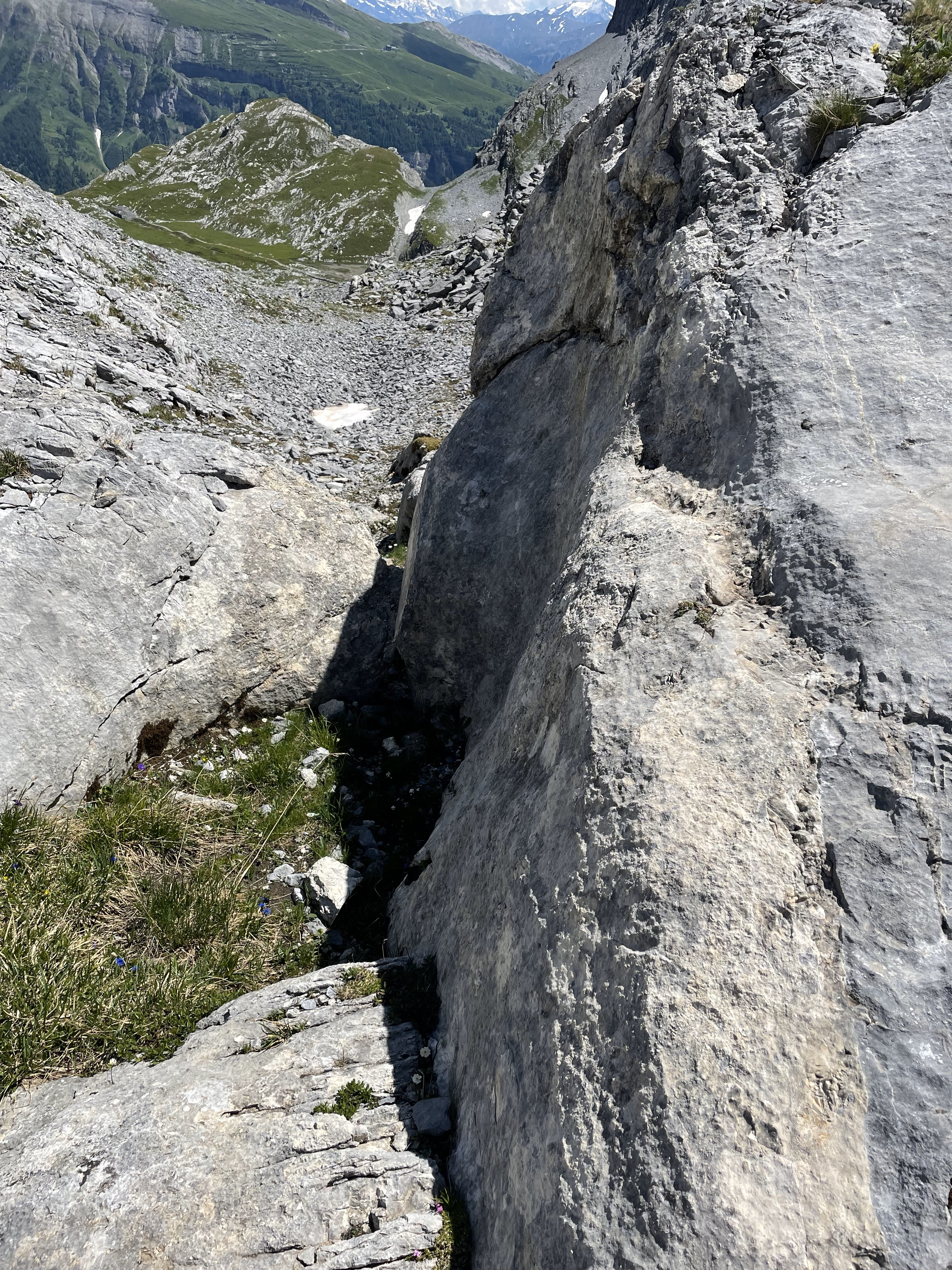
The fault line of the Gemmi Fault

The Gemmi Fault or Gemmi Pass Fault is a geologic fault in Switzerland. It lies close to the Gemmi Pass at Leukerbad and is a strike-slip fault. This fault is at least 2.6 kilometres (1.6 mi) long and shows evidence of Holocene movement; several landslides and traces of early Holocene earthquakes found in Swiss lakes may correlate to movements along the Gemmi Fault.

== Geology ==
=== Regional ===
The Alps were formed by the collision of the Adriatic and European continents and the collision is still underway, with convergence rates of less than 2 millimetres per year (0.079 in/year). This convergence causes rock uplift and earthquake activity. The western and central Swiss Alps are the fastest rising region of the country, with uplift rates of 1.5 millimetres per year (0.059 in/year) reached near Brig. A number of recently active fault systems have been identified in the Western Alps, but they often show only subtle signs of movement. Additionally, many faults are caused by gravitational phenomena rather than tectonic processes but the Gemmi Fault is undoubtedly of tectonic origin.

=== Local ===
The Gemmi Fault is a northwest–southeast trending strike-slip fault which crops out over a length of 2.6 kilometres (1.6 mi) and features an offset of at least 10 metres (33 ft). It is characterized by a conspicuous, up to 3 metres (9.8 ft) high offset in the landscape between the Daubensee northeast of the fault and the Daubenhorn southwest of it. The trace of the fault is perpendicular to the folding trends of the surrounding terrain. A damage zone surrounds the fault trace and is up to 20 metres (66 ft) wide; it is characterized by broken calcite fragments, cataclasite and veins produced by fluid flow within the fault. Joints in the rock of the area are focused on the fault and show evidence of movement.

The fault lies at the bottom of a valley at Gemmi Pass (close to Leukerbad, Valais) between 1,800–2,700 metres (5,900–8,900 ft) elevation. It cuts through carbonates, sandstones and shales of the Helvetic nappes; the rocks are of Jurassic-Eocene age and were folded during the Oligocene-Miocene. Hot springs at Leukerbad and a Tertiary dyke at the Trubelstock close to the fault indicate elevated geothermal gradients in the ground. The fault was discovered with the help of aerial photography followed by field studies and trenching.

== Geologic history ==
Radiometric dating applied to the calcite in the fault produced ages between 2.5 and 0.5 million years old. Presumably, initial faulting produced fractures that allowed fluid flow and the development of cataclasites, alternating with brittle faulting. Heat flow resulted in the thermal alteration of the host rocks.

The Gemmi Fault has offset moraine scree deposits, indicating Quaternary fault activity; this observation was also made during trenching. It has been active in post-glacial time. Luminescence dating has yielded ages of 8,700±2,000 and 2,400±500 years, which have been interpreted as either two earthquakes or as an upper limit to the age of the last fault movement. This implies that the Gemmi Fault was active during the Holocene.

Earthquakes frequently cause multiple rock slides during each event, and a number of such rockslides are documented from Switzerland. Rock slides in the Kander valley and at Rinderhorn appear to be contemporaneous about 9,800-9,600 years ago within dating uncertainty, and sediment deposits within Lake Lucerne and Lake Seelisberg indicate that an earthquake with magnitude exceeding M 6 took place 9,870-9,960 years ago. The Gemmi Fault is located within the area and has an earthquake that took place 8,700±2,000 years ago; however earthquakes in Switzerland often are not bound to specific fault systems. Climatic triggers of clustered rockslides are possible but speculative.

The movement direction of the Gemmi Fault is congruent with the regional tectonic stress field, which is supported by the kinematics of regional earthquakes which form a cluster that lies south of the fault. The magnitude of earthquakes associated with the Gemmi Fault may have reached M 5.5-5.8, intensities comparable to these of other earthquakes in Switzerland.
