= Wildstrubel =

Massif of the Bernese Alps in Switzerland

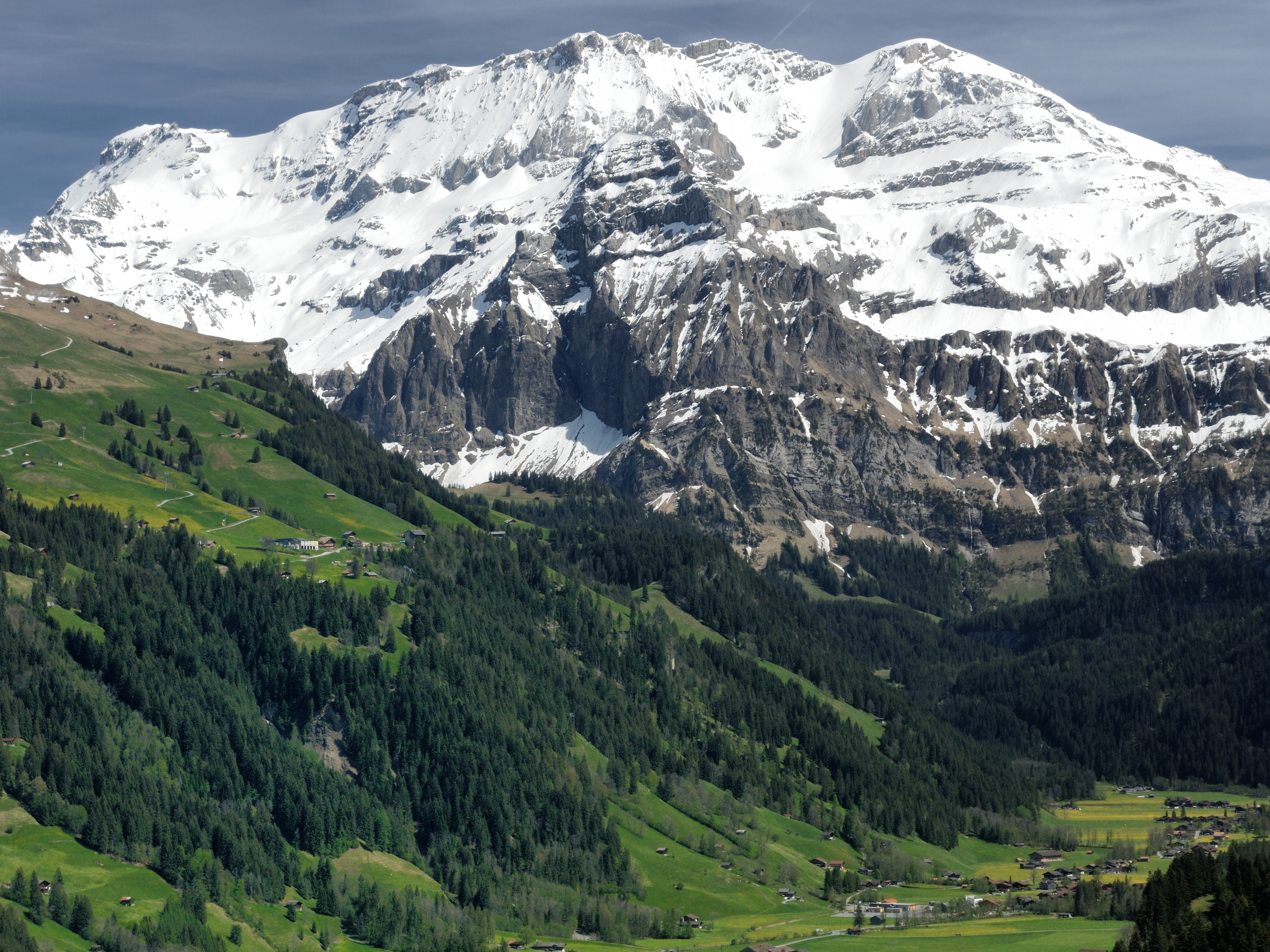
- The north-west side from the Simmental

Highest point
- Elevation: 3,244 m (10,643 ft)
- Prominence: 816 m (2,677 ft)
- Parent peak: Wildhorn
- Isolation: 9.2 km (5.7 mi)
- Listing: Alpine mountains above 3000 m
- Coordinates: 46°24′01″N 7°31′43″E

Geography
- Location within Switzerland
- Location: Bern/Valais, Switzerland
- Parent range: Bernese Alps

Climbing
- First ascent: Probably: Summer 1855 by Jakob Tritten and Dr. M. Schmid "Lenkerstrubel" 16 August 1856 by Edmund von Fellenberg and Jakob Tritten "Mittelgipfel" 8 September 1857 by Thomas W. Hinchcliff, Brandshaw Smith, and Zacharie Cachat
- Easiest route: glacier tour, rock (II)

The Wildstrubel (3,244 metres (10,643 ft)) is a mountain in the Alps, straddling the border between the Swiss cantons of Bern and Valais. It forms a large glaciated massif, about 15 km wide, extending between the Rawil Pass and the Gemmi Pass. Along with the Muverans, the Diablerets and the Wildhorn, the Wildstrubel is one of the four distinct mountain massifs of the Bernese Alps that lie west of the Gemmi Pass. The massif of the Wildstrubel is at the centre between the valleys of Simmental (BE), Engstligental (BE) and the Rhone (VS), the exact location of the tripoint being the summit of the Schneehorn. It comprises several distinct summits, including (from west to east) the Wetzsteinhorn, the Rohrbachstein, the Weisshorn, the Pointe de la Plaine Morte, Mont Bonvin, the Trubelstock and the Schneehorn. The main crest with the almost equally high summits of the Mittelgipfel (3,243 m) and the Grossstrubel (3,243 m) forms an amphitheatre oriented eastward which ends at the Steghorn and the Daubenhorn. This area encloses the Wildstrubel Glacier. To the southwest, the Wildstrubel overlooks the high plateau of the Plaine Morte Glacier, which also includes an unnamed lake below the Schneehorn.

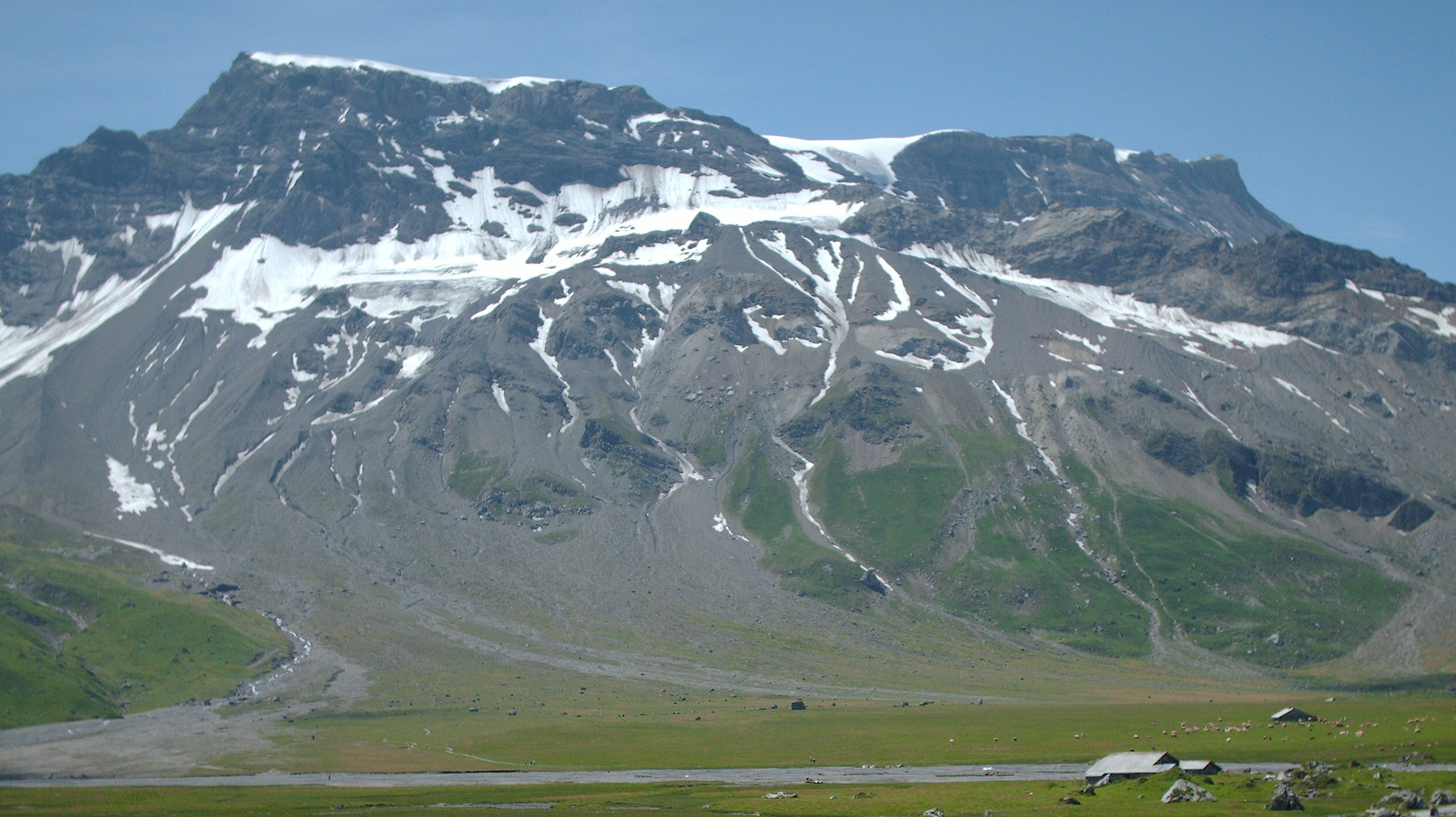
The Grossstrubel (left) and the Mittelgipfel (right) from Engstligenalp

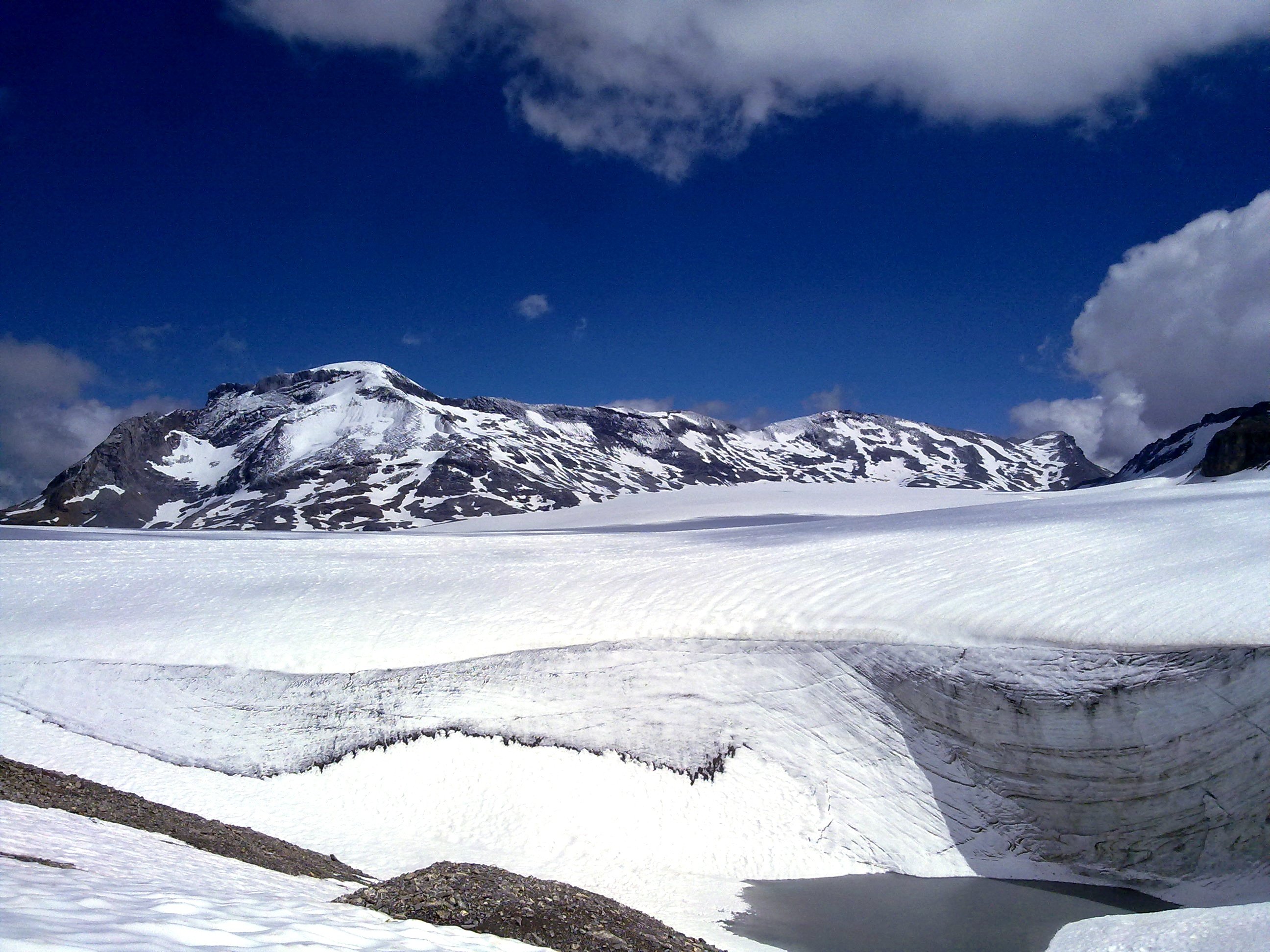
The Wildstrubel from the Plaine Morte Glacier

The Wildstrubel lies approximately halfway between Lenk (BE; 9 km), Sierre (VS; 12 km) and Adelboden (BE; 10 km), its summit being in the municipalities of Lenk and Leukerbad. The nearest settlement is the Oberried section of Lenk, at the head of the Simmental. Other notable towns and resorts around the massif are Crans-Montana, Aminona, Leukerbad and Inden. The highest place that can be reached without effort is the Pointe de la Plaine Morte station (2,882 m), which is connected to Cran-Montana and within 5 km from the summit.

As for the other mountains on the crest of the Bernese Alps, the slopes of the Wildstrubel experience different types of climate depending on their location: the northern slopes are cooler and wetter while the southern slopes are drier and warmer. Forests are found up to 1,900 metres on the north side and up to 2,100 metres on the south side. Glaciers also reach lower locations on the north side. Vineyards are also very common on the Valais side, especially below 1000 metres, but completely absent on the Bernese side, where alpine pastures dominate the landscape, as in many other areas of the Bernese Oberland.

Although not a technical climb, the ascent of the Wildstrubel involves either long ascents or glacier crossings. The shortest access is from the Pointe de la Plaine Morte station, but before the 500 metre-scramble to the top, nearly all the Plaine Morte Glacier must be crossed. Another access is from the Gemmi Pass (aerial tramway from Leukerbad), via the Lämmeren Hut (SAC), from where the ascent is made on the slopes of the much more crevassed Wildstrubel Glacier. The only glacier-free path is from Lenk, but it is also the longest ascent as the end of the paved road lies at 1,105 metres, or 2,139 metres below the summit. The mountain has three summits, all of similar height and located on the cantonal border, although within the Rhine basin. These three summits, strung out along a 3.5-km ridge, make a convenient traverse.

- The western summit (the Lenkerstrubel, named Wildstrubel on Swiss maps) (3,244 or m)
- The central summit (named Mittelgipfel on Swiss maps) (3,243 m)
- The eastern summit (the Adelbodnerstrubel or Grossstrubel) (3,243 m)

The third or fourth recorded ascent was by Leslie Stephen and Thomas W. Hinchliff with guide Melchior Anderegg on 11 September 1858.
