= Weisshorn (Bernese Alps) =

Mountain in Switzerland

- Wisshore
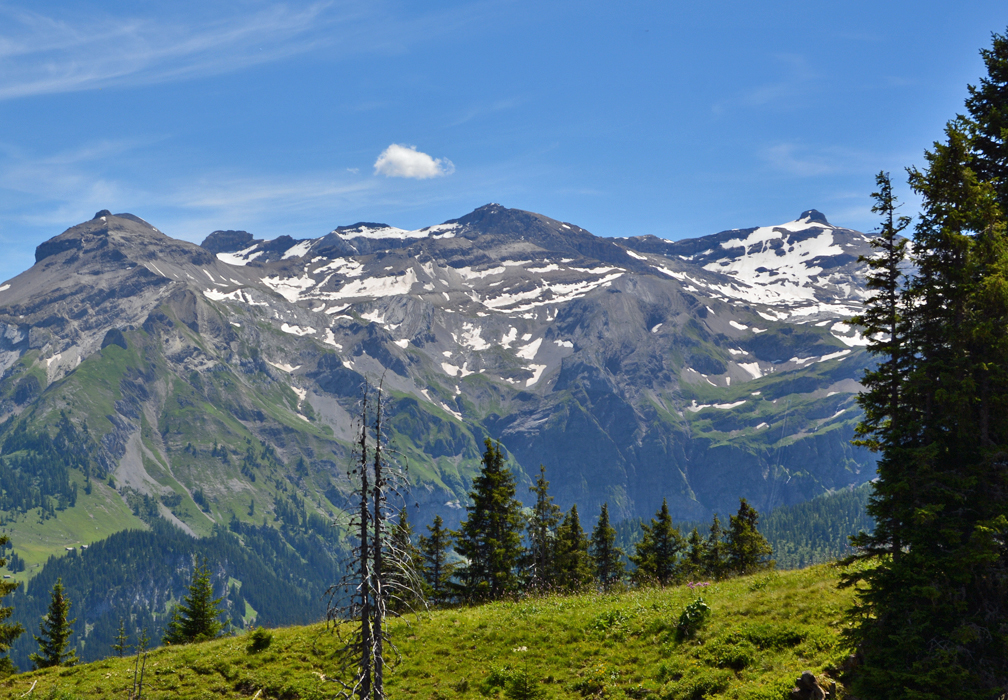
- The Weisshorn (center) seen from Betelberg.

Highest point
- Elevation: 2,948 m (9,672 ft)
- Prominence: 118 m (387 ft)
- Parent peak: Rohrbachstein
- Coordinates: 46°23′01″N 07°28′24″E

Geography
- Location within Switzerland
- Location: Bern/Valais, Switzerland
- Parent range: Bernese Alps

The Weisshorn (or Wisshore) is a mountain of the Bernese Alps, located on the border between the Swiss cantons of Bern and Valais. It lies on the main chain of the Bernese Alps, between the Rawil Pass and the Plaine Morte Glacier.

A cable car (not accessible to public) connects the summit from Iffigenalp, south of Lenk in the canton of Bern. On the top lies a radar (FLORAKO) and an air traffic control building, owned by the Swiss Army. There are however no climbing restrictions and the summit can by reached via a marked trail from the Wildstrubel hut or from the Pointe de la Plaine Morte.
