= Bonvin =

Bonvin is a surname. Notable people with the surname include:

- Christophe Bonvin (born 1965), Swiss footballer
- François Bonvin (1817–1887), French painter
- Gilbert Bonvin (1931–1983), French footballer
- Léon Bonvin (1834–1866), French painter
- Louis Bonvin (1886–1946), French diplomat and general
- Pablo Facundo Bonvín (born 1981), Argentine footballer
- Roger Bonvin (1907–1982), Swiss politician

See also

- Mont Bonvin, a mountain of the Bernese Alps, overlooking Crans-Montana in the Swiss canton of Valais
