= Rohrbachstein =

Mountain in Switzerland

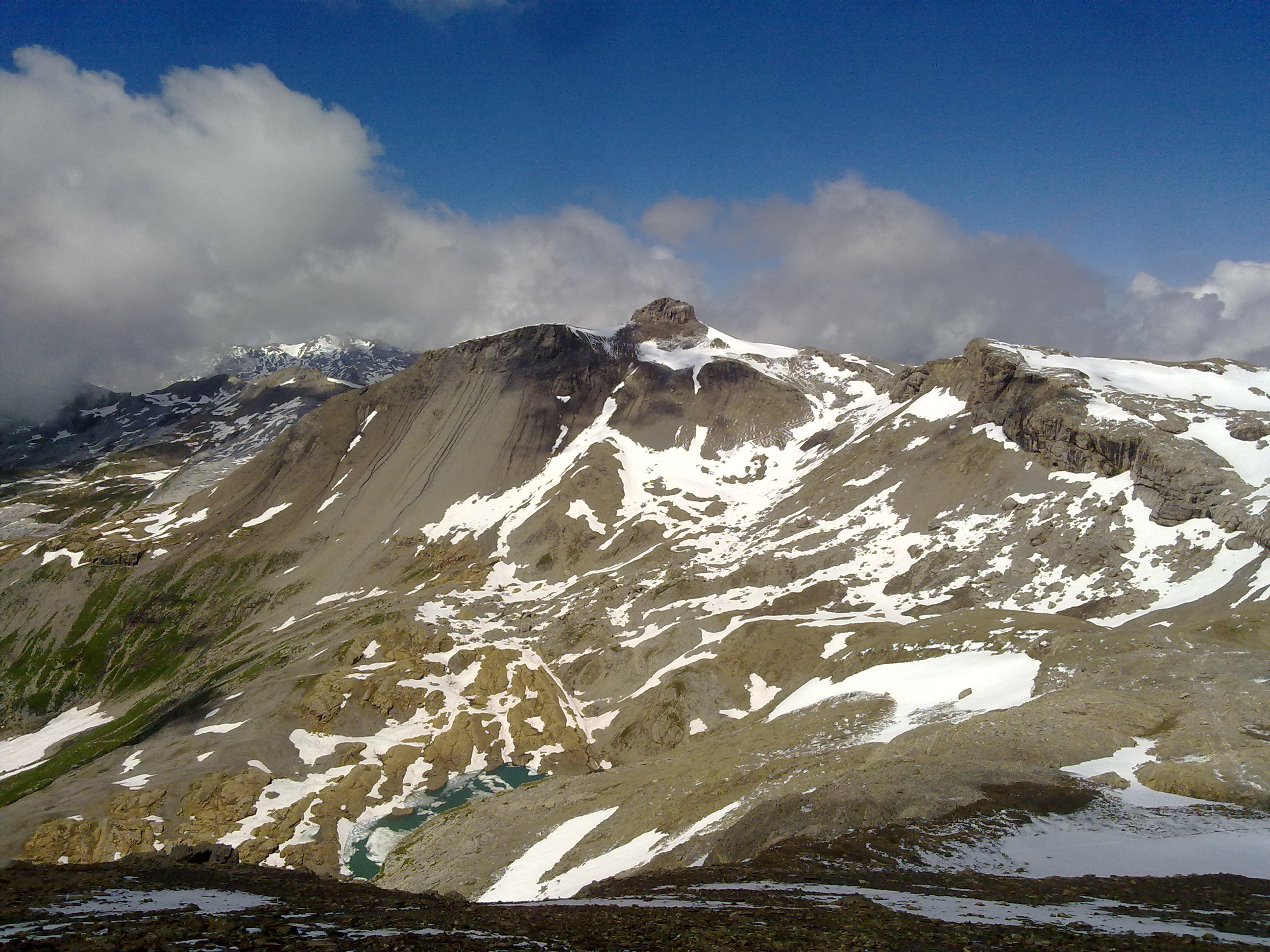
- View from Pointe de la Plaine Morte (north side)

Highest point
- Elevation: 2,950 m (9,680 ft)
- Prominence: 209 m (686 ft)
- Parent peak: Wildstrubel
- Coordinates: 46°22′35.3″N 7°27′43.7″E

Geography
- Location within Switzerland
- Location: Bern/Valais, Switzerland
- Parent range: Bernese Alps

The Rohrbachstein is a mountain of the Bernese Alps, located on the border between the Swiss cantons of Bern and Valais. It lies between the Rawil Pass and the Plaine Morte Glacier.
