= Daubenhorn =

Mountain

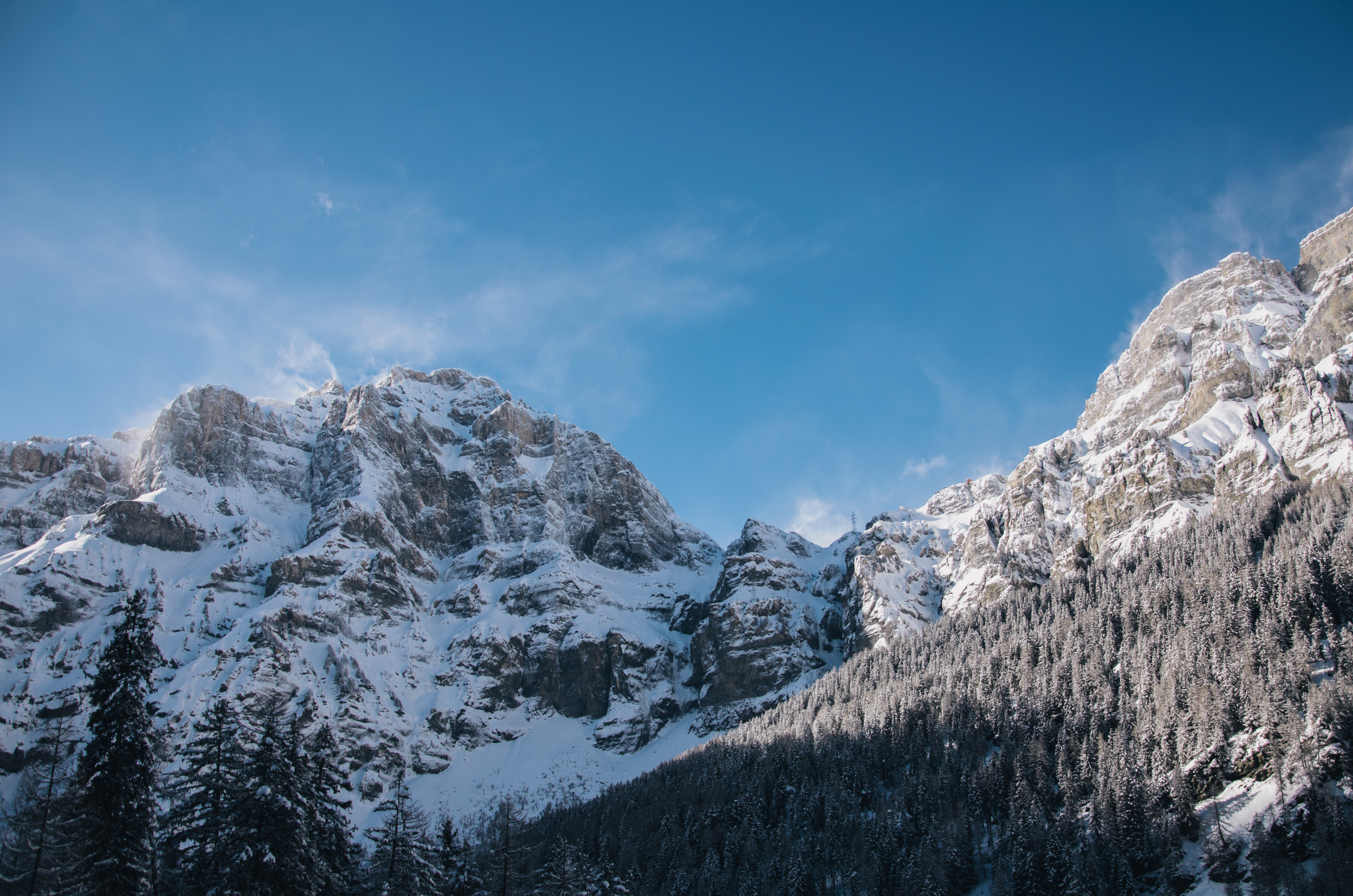
- Daubenwall in February 2014

Highest point
- Elevation: 2,942 m (9,652 ft)
- Prominence: 92 m (302 ft)
- Parent peak: Wildstrubel
- Coordinates: 46°23′21.6″N 7°36′09.3″E

Geography
- Location within Switzerland
- Location: Valais, Switzerland
- Parent range: Bernese Alps

The Daubenhorn is a mountain in the Bernese Alps, located above the town of Leukerbad, Switzerland. The mountain has the longest via ferrata, or secured climbing route, in Switzerland. The route is built into the mountain's southeastern face and continues to the summit.

This via ferrata is considered to be extremely difficult (ED) and requires very good fitness to make the 6 hour climb to the summit from the base of the Via Ferrata at 2350 m. In addition, it is also possible to reach the summit by trekking a circuitous route starting from Gemmi Pass.
