= Gemmi Pass =

Mountain pass across the Bernese Alps

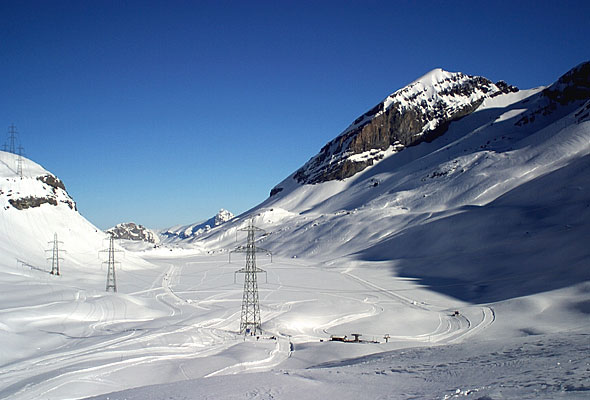
- Gemmi Pass

- Location within Switzerland
- Elevation: 2,269 m (7,444 ft)
- Traversed by: Trail

Location
- Location: Valais, Switzerland
- Range: Bernese Alps
- Coordinates: 46°23′47″N 7°36′42″E

Gemmi Pass is a high mountain pass across the Bernese Alps connecting Leukerbad (on the south) in the canton of Valais with Kandersteg (on the north) in the canton of Bern. The pass itself lies within the canton of Valais, at a height of 2,269 metres (7,444 ft) above sea level. The main trail reaches 2,322 metres (7,618 ft).

The pass lies between the Daubenhorn (2,942 metres (9,652 ft)) in the west and the Plattenhörner in the east.

The pass is at the west end of the Aar Massif and at the east end of the Wildstrubel Massif. Near the pass is the Daubensee, which has no outlet above ground. The Gemmi Fault passes close to the pass.

The pass is mentioned in the Sherlock Holmes story “The Final Problem.” Sherlock Holmes and Dr. Watson cross the pass on their way to Meiringen, where Sherlock Holmes has his famous meeting with Professor Moriarty at the Reichenbach Falls.

The pass is described by Guy de Maupassant in his short-story L'Auberge. The American writer Mark Twain also visited the pass in August 1878, and described it in a letter to his wife.

Although the pass cannot be traversed by road, it is still directly accessible by cablecar from Leukerbad. Alternatively, the pass can be reached by a two-hour dramatic hike on foot.

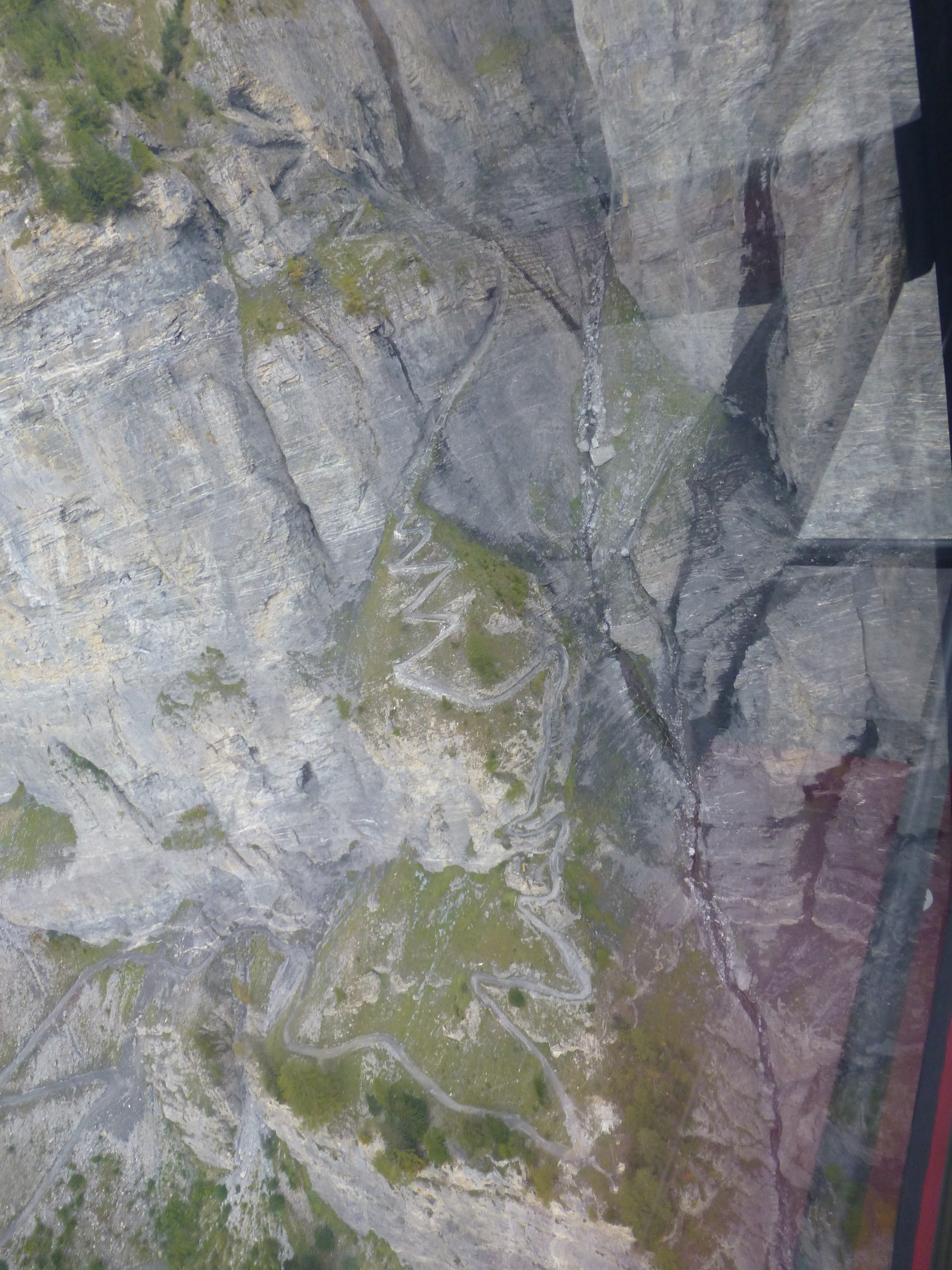
It should take about two hours from Leukerbad to reach the pass area along this steep and winding hiking path.

From Kandersteg a cable car gives access to the Sunnbüel area (1,934 m), 10 km north of the pass, allowing hikers to cross the pass on a wide and easy trail.

The trail over the Gemmi Pass is very popular with hikers both in summer and in winter.

The pass itself is also used as a vantage point, because of the view of some major peaks in the Pennine Alps, such as the Dom, Matterhorn, Weisshorn and Dent Blanche.

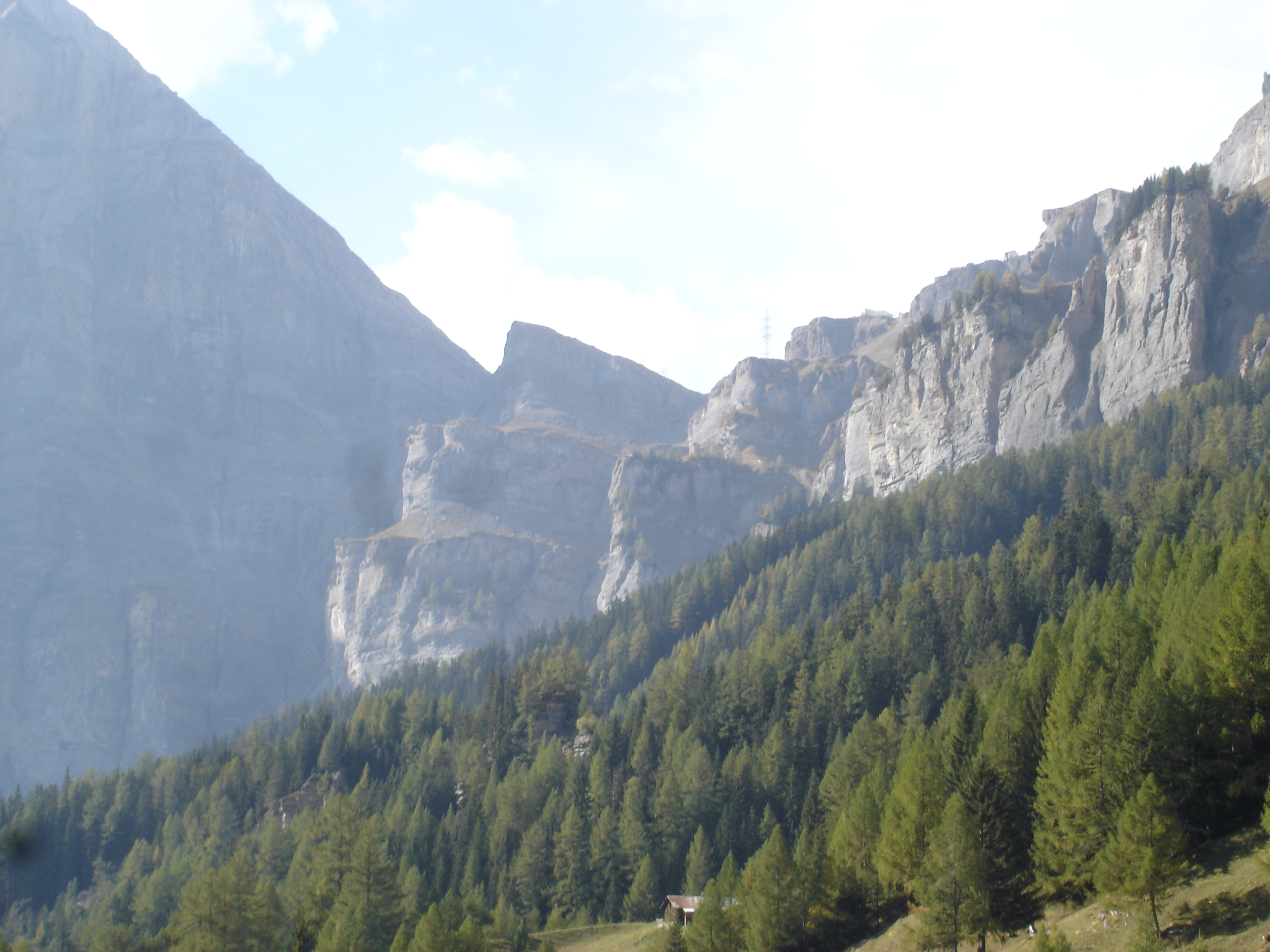
Gemmi Pass as seen from Leukerbad

== See also ==
- List of mountain passes in Switzerland
