= Trubelstock =

Mountain in Switzerland

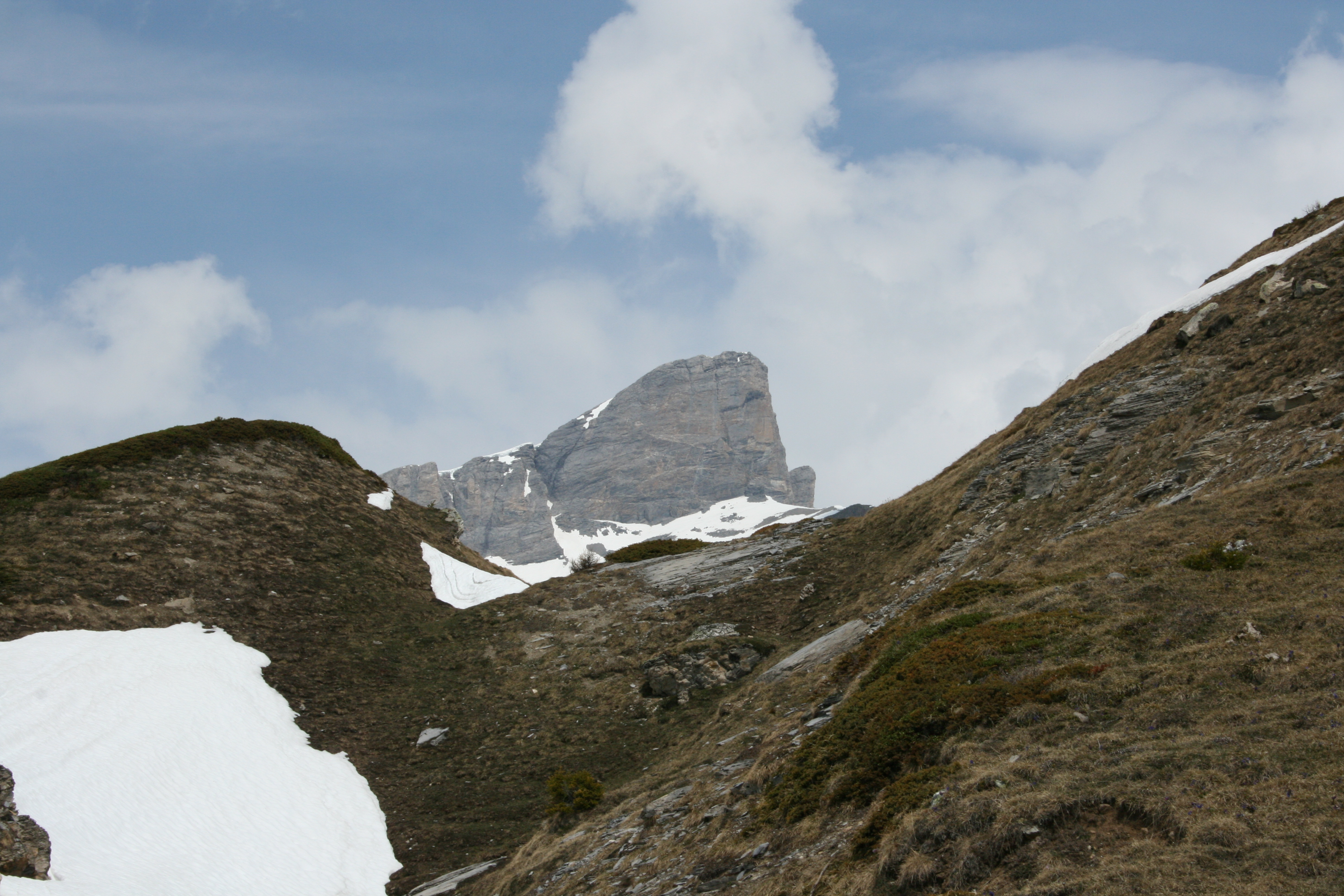
- Trubelstock from Varneralp

Highest point
- Elevation: 2,998 m (9,836 ft)
- Prominence: 158 m (518 ft)
- Parent peak: Wildstrubel
- Coordinates: 46.3702°N 7.5719°E

Geography
- Location within Switzerland
- Location: Valais, Switzerland
- Parent range: Bernese Alps

The Trubelstock is a mountain of the Bernese Alps, overlooking the Rhone valley near Sierre in the canton of Valais. Its summit (2,998 m) lies between the valleys of Les Outannes and Leukerbad, south of the Wildstrubel.
