= Mont Bonvin =

Mountain in Switzerland

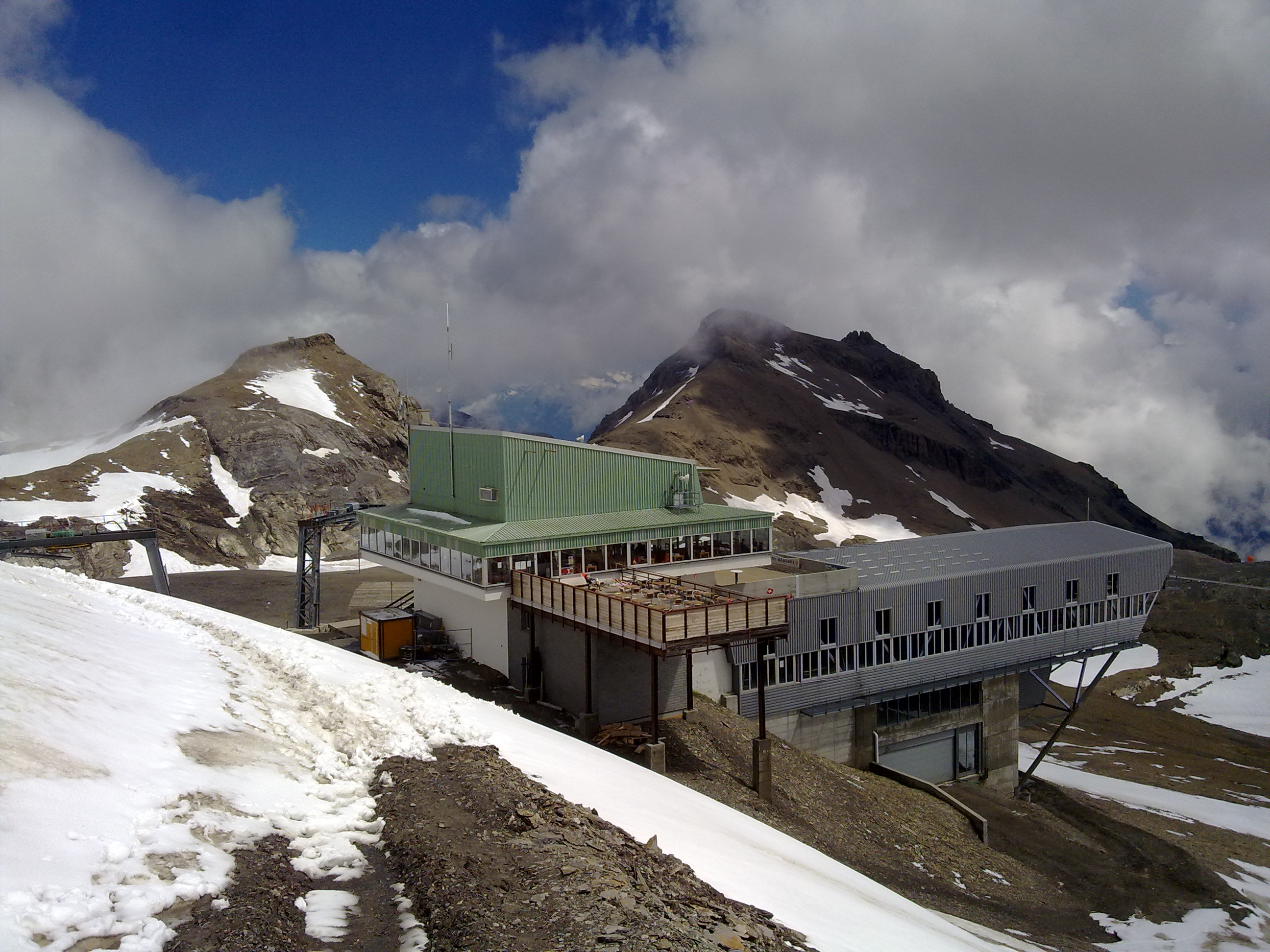
- Mont Bonvin (right summit) from Pointe de la Plaine Morte

Highest point
- Elevation: 2,995 m (9,826 ft)
- Prominence: 242 m (794 ft)
- Parent peak: Wildstrubel
- Coordinates: 46°21′52.3″N 7°30′28.3″E

Geography
- Location within Switzerland
- Location: Valais, Switzerland
- Parent range: Bernese Alps

Mont Bonvin (French pronunciation: [mɔ̃ bɔ̃vɛ̃]) is a mountain of the Bernese Alps, overlooking Crans-Montana in the Swiss canton of Valais. The border with the canton of Bern runs one kilometre north of the summit.

Mont Bonvin is located near the Plaine Morte Glacier, which can be reached from Crans-Montana by a cable car. From the upper station, a trail lead to the summit.
