= Wildstrubel Glacier =

Glacier in Switzerland

Coordinates: 46°24′2″N 7°32′25″E

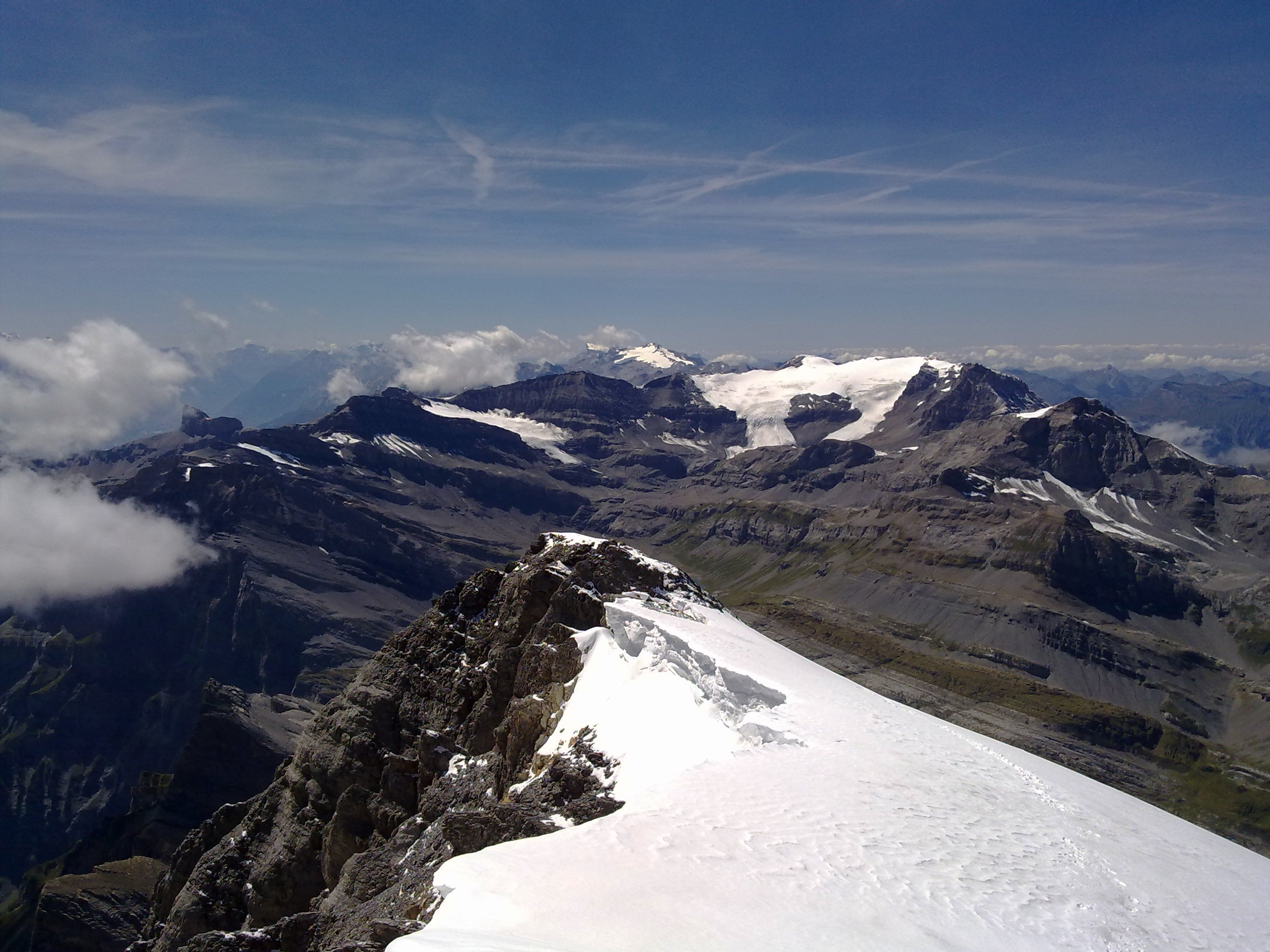
The Wildstrubel and its glacier (view from the Rinderhorn)

The Wildstrubel Glacier (German: Wildstrubelgletscher) is a 2.5 km (1.6 mi) long glacier (2005) situated in the Bernese Alps in the canton of Valais, on the eastern slopes of the Wildstrubel. In 1973 it had an area of 4.8 km^{2} (1.9 sq mi)

== See also ==
- List of glaciers in Switzerland
- Swiss Alps
