= Daubensee =

Lake in Valais, Switzerland

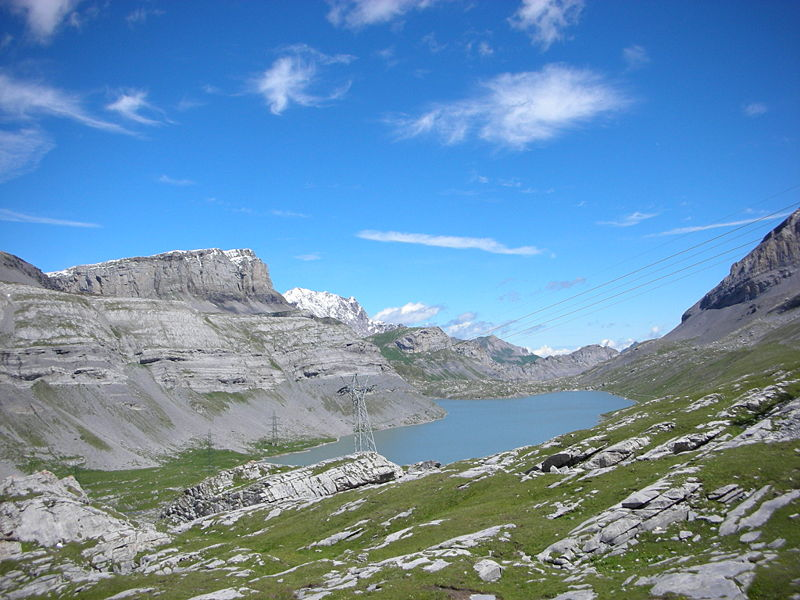

- Location within Canton of Valais Location within Canton of Bern Location within Switzerland Location within Alps
- Interactive map of Daubensee
- Location: Gemmi Pass, Valais
- Coordinates: 46°24′50″N 7°37′14″E
- Basin countries: Switzerland
- Surface area: 69 ha (170 acres)
- Surface elevation: 2,205 m (7,234 ft)
- Frozen: winter

Daubensee is a lake at Gemmi Pass in Valais, Switzerland. It is the site of the annual Shepherd Festival held on the last Sunday in July. It has a surface area of 69 ha (170 acres).

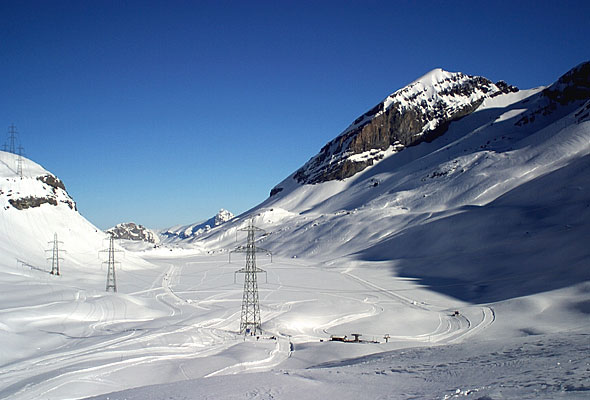
Frozen lake seen from Gemmi Pass

== See also ==
- List of lakes of Switzerland
- List of mountain lakes of Switzerland
