= Schneehorn =

Mountain in Switzerland

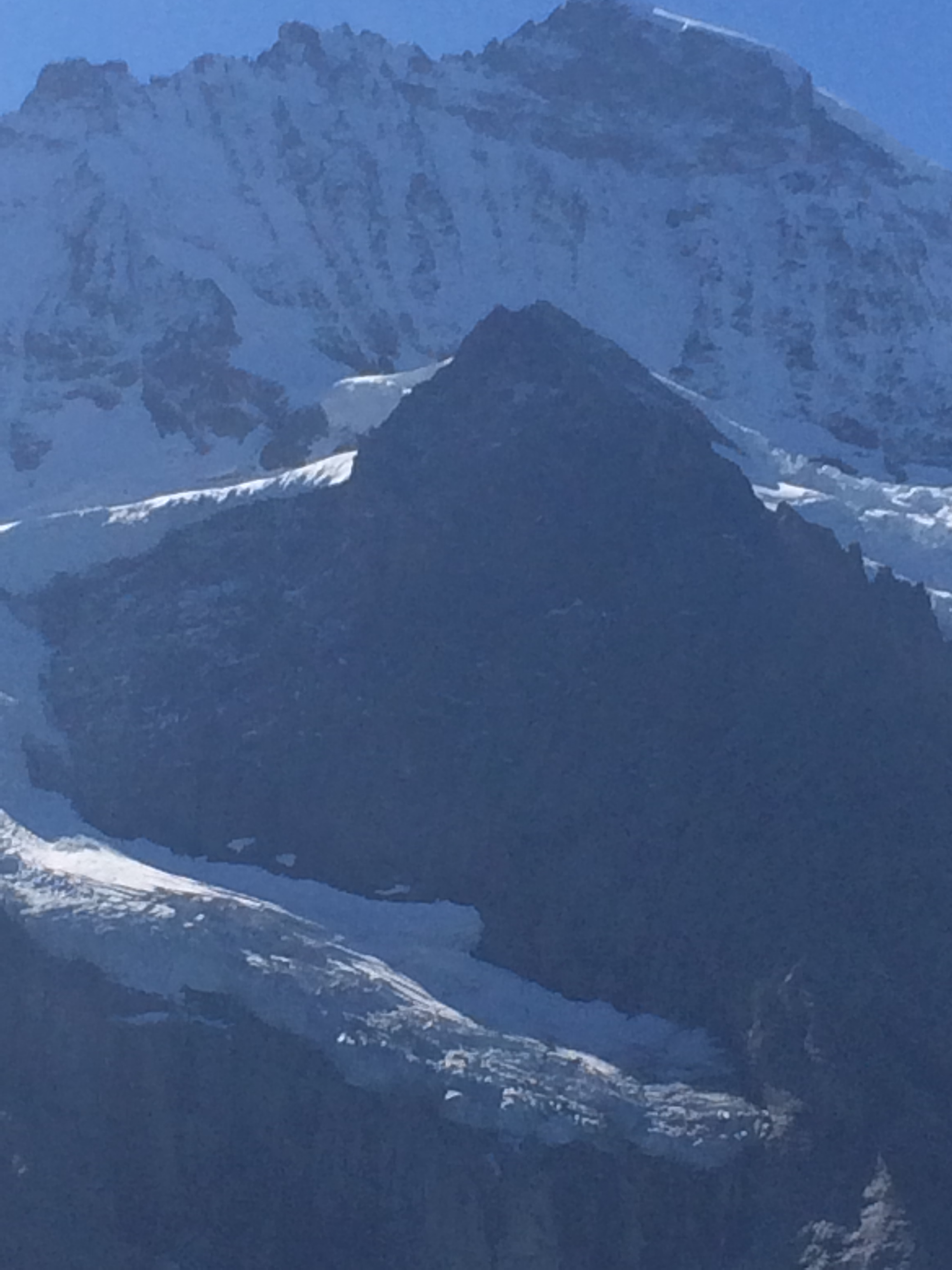
- Schneehorn in September 2018 from north side

Highest point
- Elevation: 3,400 m (11,200 ft)
- Prominence: 35 m (115 ft)
- Parent peak: Jungfrau
- Coordinates: 46°32′57.5″N 7°57′43″E

Geography
- Location within Switzerland
- Location: Bern Switzerland
- Parent range: Bernese Alps

The Schneehorn is a mountain of the Bernese Alps with a height of 3,400 metres (11,200 ft). The peak is located on the steep North slopes of the Jungfrau (4,158 metres (13,642 ft)) with glaciers to the East and the West.

The name on the official Swiss maps is Schneehoren in Swissgerman. There is an other mountain with the same name near the Wildstrubel (VS/BE), Schneehore on the maps.
