= Wetzsteinhorn =

Mountain in Switzerland

- Sex des Molettes
- Location within Switzerland

Highest point
- Elevation: 2,782 m (9,127 ft)
- Coordinates: 46°21′49.9″N 7°26′3.9″E

Geography
- Location: Valais, Switzerland
- Parent range: Bernese Alps

The Wetzsteinhorn (also known as Sex des Molettes) is a mountain of the Bernese Alps, overlooking the lake of Tseuzier in the canton of Valais.
