= Plaine Morte Glacier =

Glacier in Switzerland

- French: glacier de la Plaine Morte (its largest tongue: German: Rezligletscher)
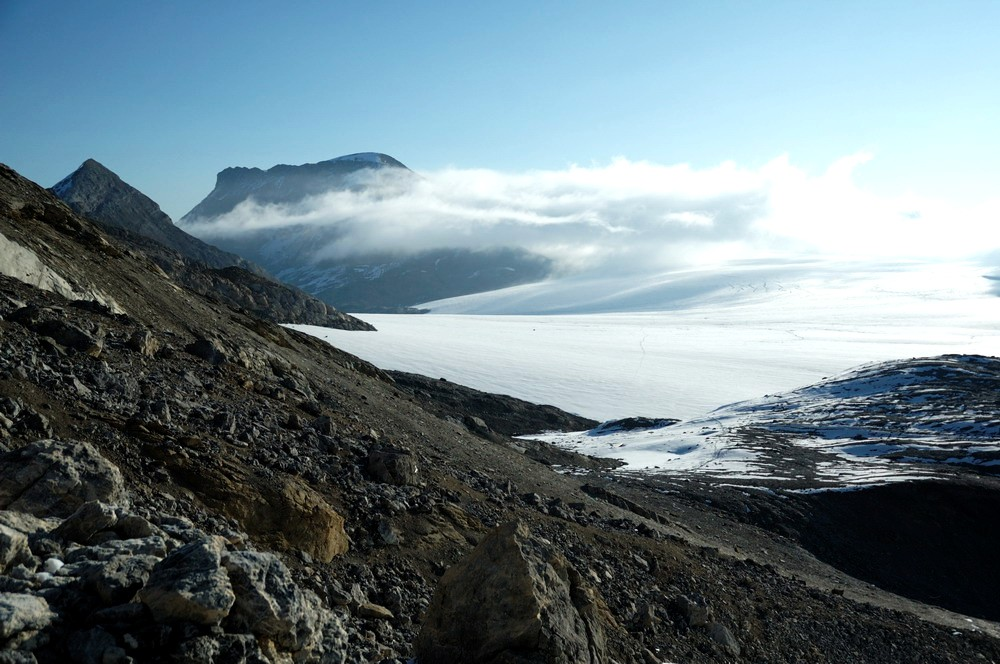
- Wildstrubel and glacier
- Interactive map of Plaine Morte Glacier
- Type: horizontal ice field
- Location: Lenk, BE (Crans-Montana, VS), Switzerland
- Coordinates: 46°23′N 7°30′E
- Area: 9.0 km^{2} (3.5 sq mi) (1973)
- Length: 4.87 km (3.03 mi) (2016)
- Highest elevation: 2,840 m (9,320 ft)
- Lowest elevation: 2,470 m (8,100 ft)
- Terminus: Trüebbach (Rhine), La Tièche (Rhône)
- Status: diminishing

The Plaine Morte Glacier (lit.: Dead Plain Glacier; French: glacier de la Plaine Morte [ɡlasje də la plɛn mɔʁt]) is a glacier located at an elevation of 2,750 m (9,020 ft), in the canton of Bern above Lenk and in the Valais above Crans-Montana in Switzerland. The ice field, which covers 7.88 square kilometres (3.04 sq mi), is located below the mountain of Wildstrubel in the Bernese Alps. Its largest tongue is also called in German Rezligletscher or Rätzligletscher.

The area of Plaine Morte is easily accessible from Crans-Montana by cable car and the practice of cross-country skiing is possible throughout the year. The summit of the Pointe de la Plaine Morte offers impressive views of the Valais Alps.

A large lake formed at the eastern base of the glacier, south of the Schneehorn, at a height of 2,752 metres above sea level. The surface area of the lake is 0.11 km².

== Panorama ==
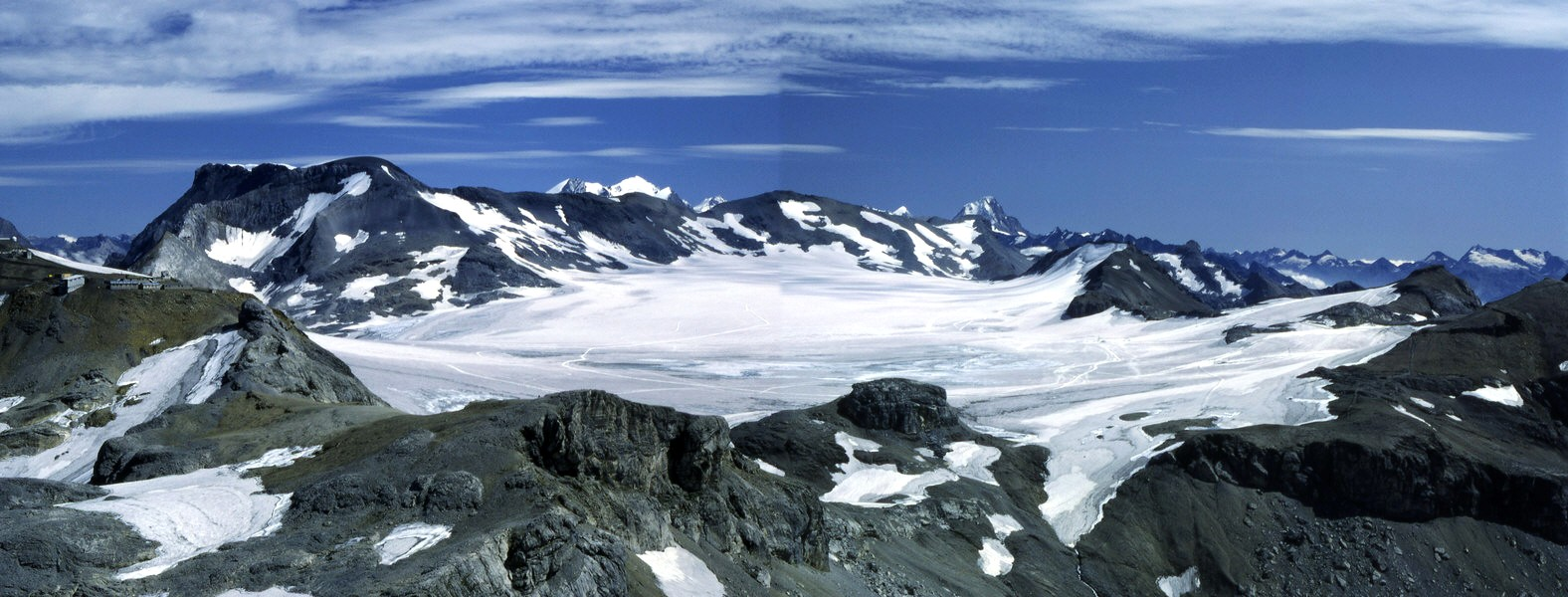

== See also ==
- List of glaciers in Switzerland
- List of glaciers
- Retreat of glaciers since 1850
- Swiss Alps
