= Leukerbad =

- Municipality
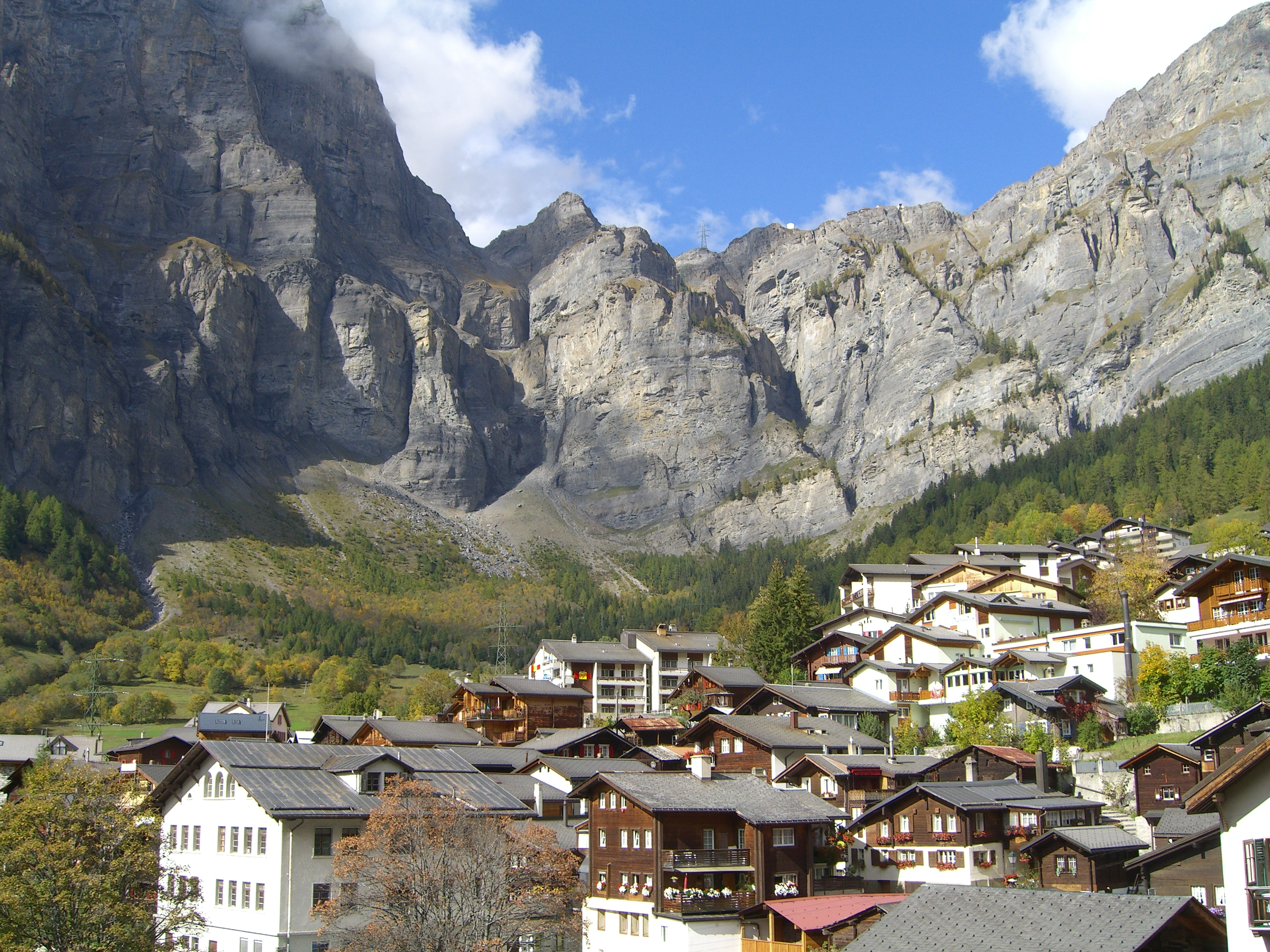
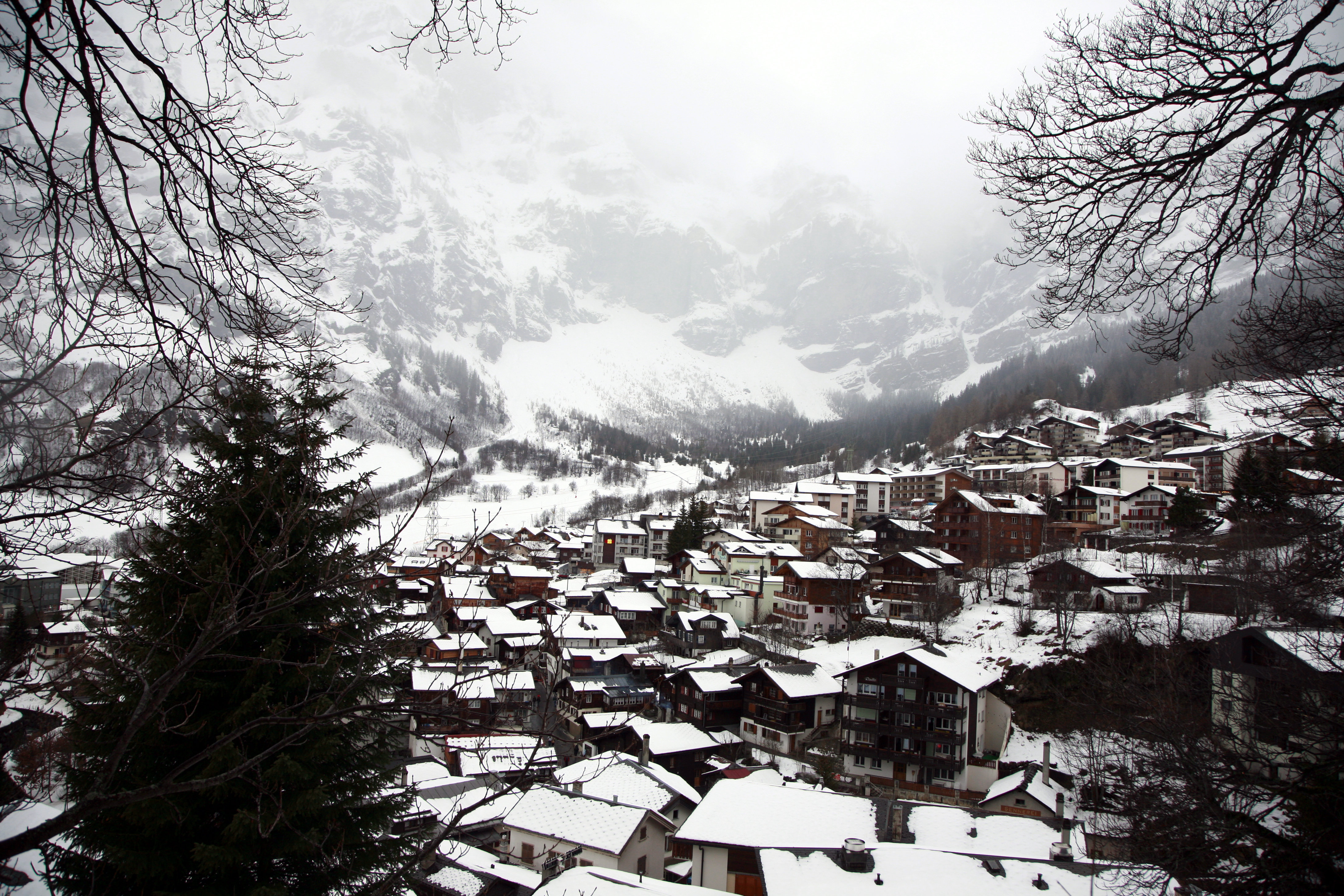
- Leukerbad in mid-October 2006

- Flag Coat of arms
- Location of Leukerbad
- Location within Switzerland Location within Canton of Valais
- Coordinates: 46°23′N 7°38′E
- Country: Switzerland
- Canton: Valais
- District: Leuk

Government
  - Mayor: Christian Grichting

Area
  - Total: 67.2 km^{2} (25.9 sq mi)
- Elevation: 1,411 m (4,629 ft)

Population (December 2002)
  - Total: 1,436
  - Density: 21.4/km^{2} (55.3/sq mi)
- Time zone: UTC+01:00 (CET)
  - Summer (DST): UTC+02:00 (CEST)
- Postal code: 3954
- SFOS number: 6111
- ISO 3166 code: CH-VS
- Surrounded by: Adelboden (BE), Albinen, Ferden, Guttet-Feschel, Inden, Kandersteg (BE), Lenk im Simmental (BE), Mollens
- Twin towns: Dombóvár, Hungary
- Website: www.leukerbad.org

Leukerbad (Swiss Standard German pronunciation: [ˈlɔʏkərbaːd]; French: Loèche-les-Bains [lɔɛʃ le bɛ̃]; Walliser German: Leiggerbad, although locally known as ds Baadu) is a municipality in the district of Leuk in the canton of Valais in Switzerland.

== History ==
Historic aerial photograph by Werner Friedli from 1955

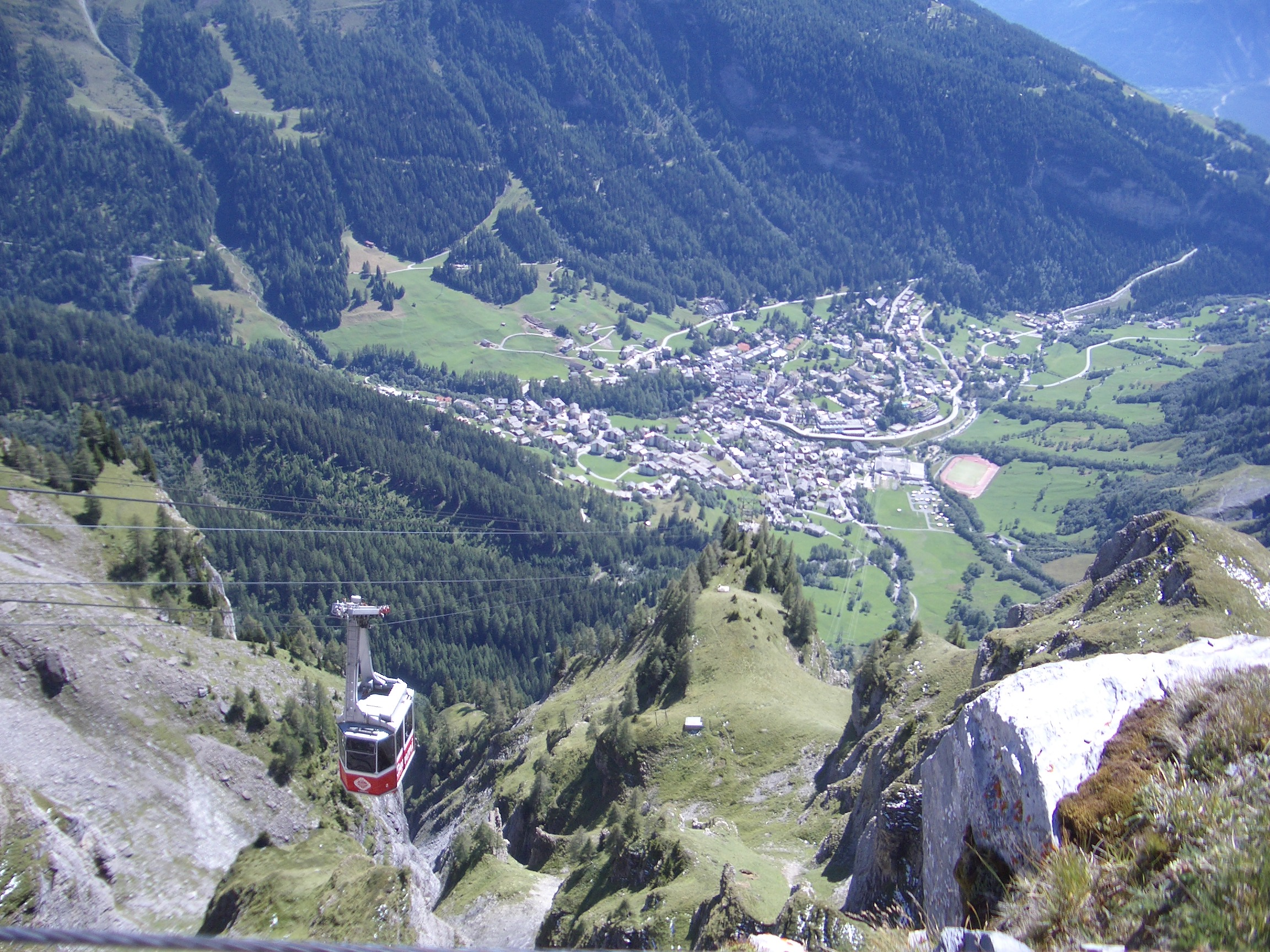
A view of Leukerbad from the Gemmi Pass

The story of Leukerbad dates back to the 4th century B.C. Graves and ceramics attest the presence of habitation in Leukerbad. Since the 5th century, the pass of the Gemmi, a unique link between the cantons of Valais and Bern, has been in use.

In 1229, Leukerbad was mentioned for the first time and called "Boez". French was the locally spoken language at that time.

In 1315, the commune became independent, and the oldest known document about Leukerbad already mentioned the baths.

In 1501, the Bishop and Cardinal Matthäus Schiner acquired the rights for the baths and spoke highly of the health resort during his visits; the thermal tourism developed. By that time, German (Walser German, brought by the Walser migrations), was spoken locally.

Between the 16th and 18th centuries, several major avalanches hit the village but the inhabitants rebuilt it each time.

During the early history of tourism in Switzerland, a number of notable guests visited Leukerbad, including Isabelle de Charrière (1776 and 1777), Johann Wolfgang von Goethe (1779), Guy de Maupassant (1877) and Mark Twain (1878).

In 1908, the company Chemin de Fer Electric Leukerbad was founded, but the road quickly dominated the access to the village and the trains stopped in 1967. The cable-car to the top of Gemmi Pass was built in 1957 and the one to Torrent Alp in 1970-72.

Beginning in the 1980s, the municipality under president Otto G. Loretan began to undertake massive investments into infrastructure. In 1980, the community's thermal centre, the Burgerbad, was opened. The sports centre followed in 1990 and the thermal centre Alpentherme in 1993.

In 1998, Leukerbad offered for the first time a "fixed-rope climbing" (Via ferrata/Klettersteig) route of the Daubenhorn, which is currently the longest in Switzerland.

By 1998, the municipality had accumulated debts of CHF 346 million (some CHF 200,000 per inhabitant), and was the first municipality in the history of Switzerland to file for bankruptcy. As a consequence, Leukerbad was placed under cantonal administration during 1998 to 2004. Former president Loretan was convicted to a five-year prison sentence for fraud in August 2004.

== Geography ==
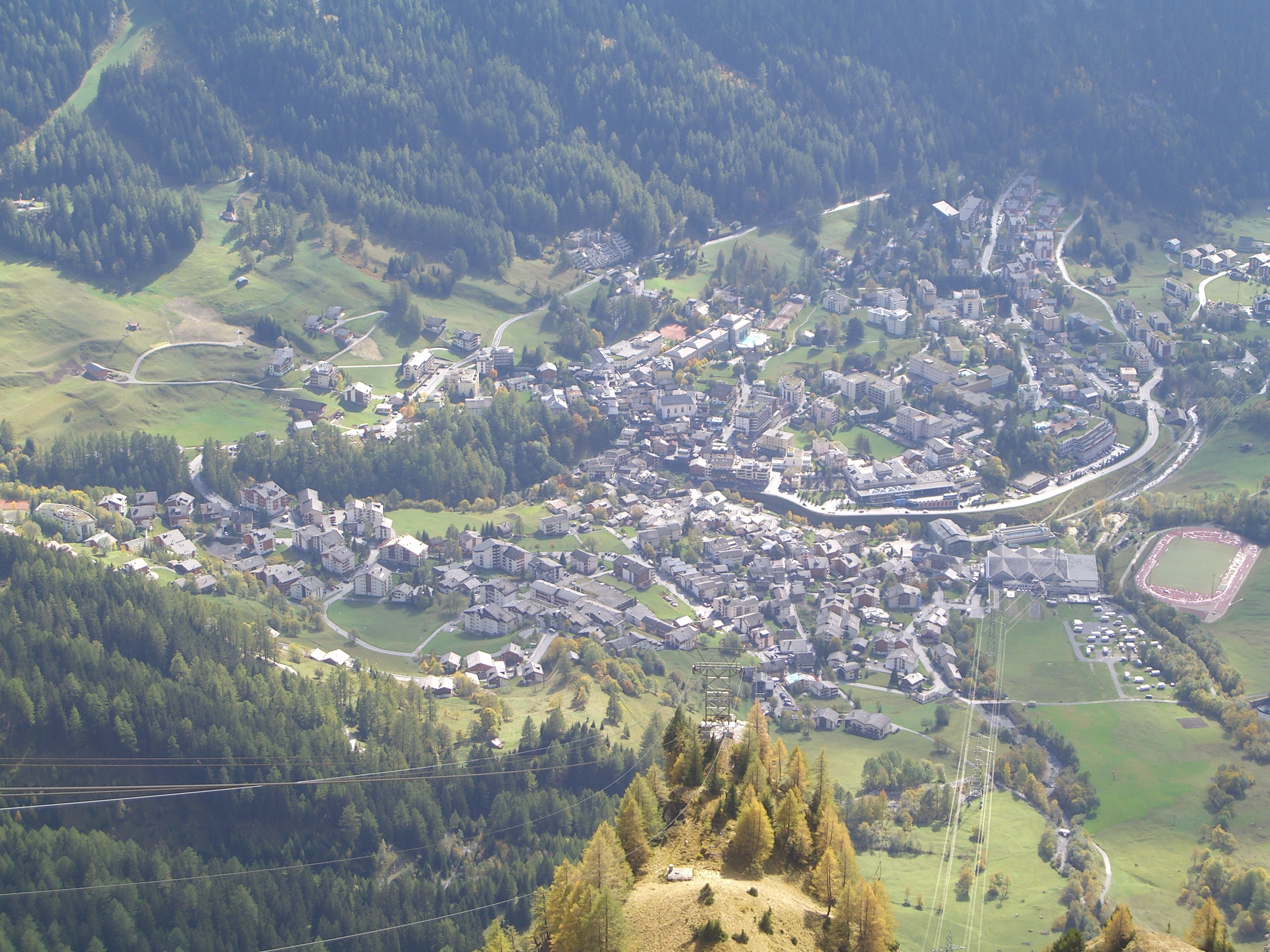
Aerial view of Leukerbad

Leukerbad has an area, as of 2009, of 67.2 square kilometers (25.9 mi^{2}). Of this area, 9.52 km^{2} (3.68 mi^{2}) or 14.2% is used for agricultural purposes, while 5.99 km^{2} (2.31 mi^{2}) or 8.9% is forested. Of the rest of the land, 0.91 km^{2} (0.35 mi^{2}) or 1.4% is settled (buildings or roads), 1.32 km^{2} (0.51 mi^{2}) or 2.0% is either rivers or lakes and 49.47 km^{2} (19.10 mi^{2}) or 73.6% is unproductive land.

Of the built up area, housing and buildings made up 0.8% and transportation infrastructure made up 0.3%. Out of the forested land, 6.2% of the total land area is heavily forested and 1.7% is covered with orchards or small clusters of trees. Of the agricultural land, 0.0% is used for growing crops and 2.6% is pastures and 11.6% is used for alpine pastures. Of the water in the municipality, 1.1% is in lakes and 0.9% is in rivers and streams. Of the unproductive areas, 9.0% is unproductive vegetation, 53.8% is too rocky for vegetation and 10.8% of the land is covered by glaciers.

Leukerbad is situated in the canton of Valais in the south of Switzerland at 1,411 m (4,629 ft) above sea level. The location is very impressive because of the cliffs which surround Leukerbad: to the east, the Daubenhorn at 2,942 m (9,652 ft) above sea level; to the north the Gemmi Pass (2,322 m [7,618 ft]) and the Balmhorn (3,698 m [12,133 ft]); to the west the Torrenthorn (2,998 m [9,836 ft]).

The road which leads to Leukerbad comes into the secluded valley from the south and the town of Leuk in the Rhone valley.

=== Climate ===
Leukerbad has an average of 121.9 days of rain or snow per year, and on average receives 1,188 mm (46.8 in) of precipitation. he wettest month is December during which time Leukerbad receives an average of 130 mm (5.1 in) of rain or snow. During this month there is precipitation for an average of 10.2 days. The month with the most days of precipitation is August, with an average of 11.4, but with only 103 mm (4.1 in) of rain or snow. The driest month of the year is April with an average of 72 mm (2.8 in) of precipitation over 9.9 days.

=== Gemmi ===
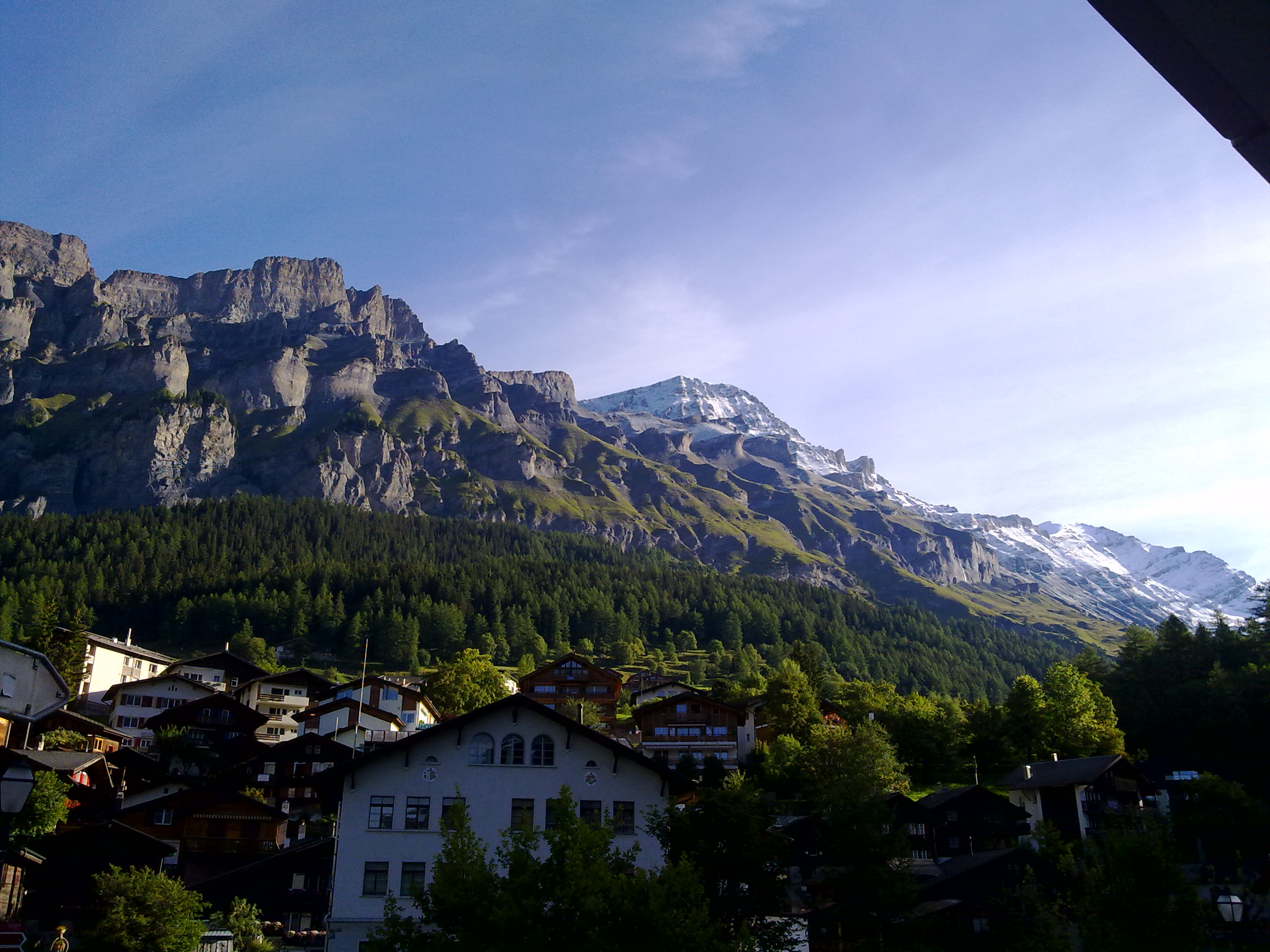
Rinderhorn mountains

The Gemmi Pass is famous in the history of the Valais because it had for a long time been a very busy route between Valais and Bern.

The Gemmi is accessible with the cable-car which connects Leukerbad to the highest point on the pass (2,322 m [7,618 ft]).

From the pass, there are extensive views of the Alps. The region is well known in summer for its hiking trails to Kandersteg, Adelboden or the Wildstrubel. It is visited by the families because of the small lake called "Daubensee" which is surrounded by easy walks and is a popular place for picnics.

In winter, this lake is ideal for cross-country skiers but visitors also go there for a snow-shoe trail, a run downhill with a sledge or just a walk on prepared, signposted hikes.

=== Torrent ===
The cable-car to Torrent Alp brings to the Rinderhütte at 2,313 m (7,589 ft) above sea level. In winter it is the paradise of skiers who then have 50 km (31 mi) of runs at their disposal.

In summer it offers a large network of hiking and mountain bike trails.

The panoramic views from the Rinderhütte of the 4,000 m (13,000 ft) peaks of the Valais, French and Italian Alps are breath taking.

== Thermal baths ==
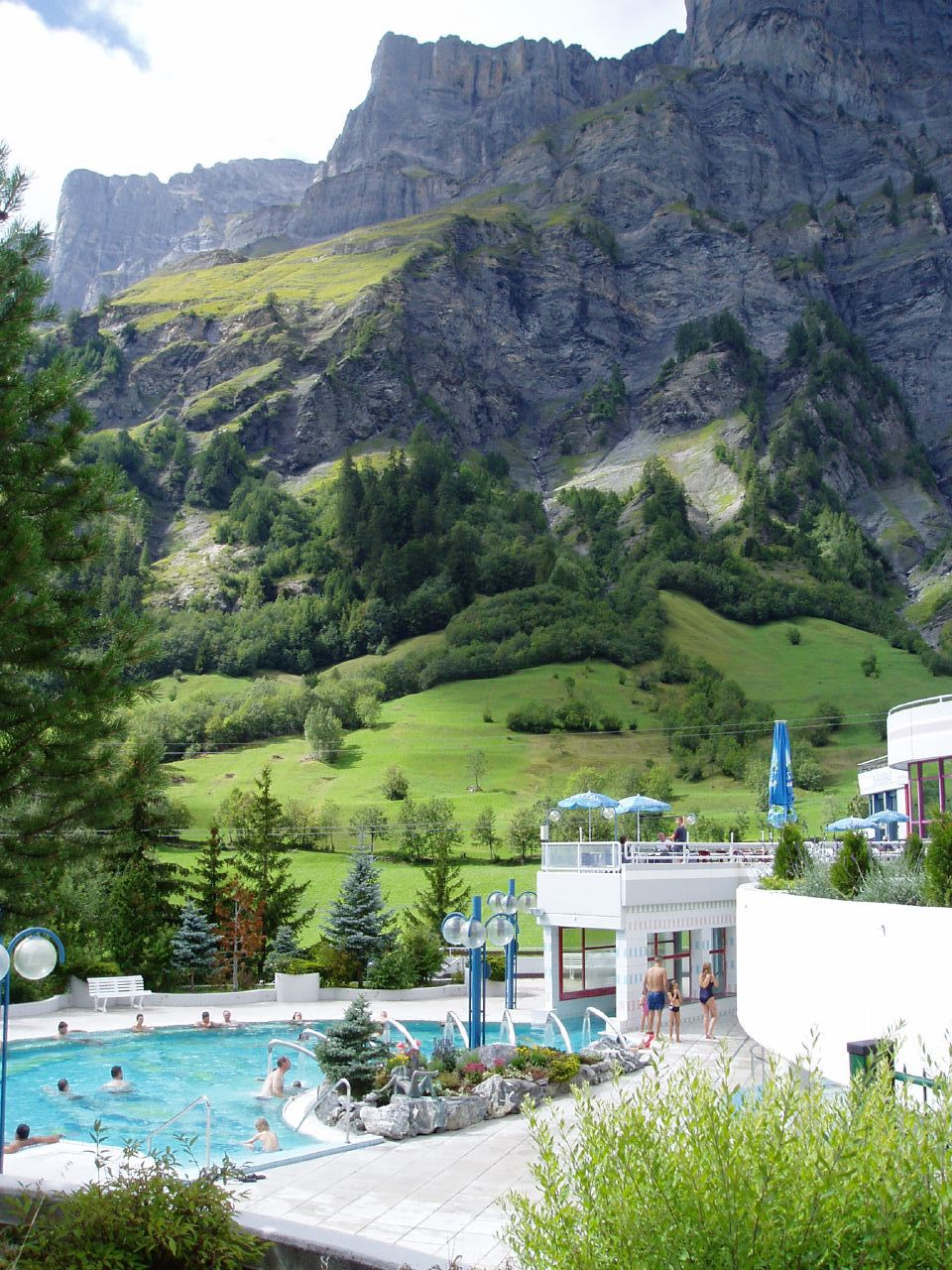
Burgerbad

The history of the springs of Leukerbad dates back to Roman times. People, even then, were already aware of the therapeutic effect of the thermal water.

Today, 3,900,000 litres (1,000,000 US gal) of thermal water - up to 51 °C (124 °F) - flow from the springs and feed 22 thermal pools. Several baths are at the disposal of guests in private hotels, in the rehabilitation centre and in the Volksheilbad, but the biggest public baths are the Leukerbad Therme (previously Burgerbad) and the Walliser Alpentherme (previously the Lindner Alpentherme).

== Coat of arms ==
The blazon of the municipal coat of arms is Gules, standing on Coupeaux Vert a Griffin rampant coward Argent and Or holding in dexter a Chalice of the last pouring water of the third in chief crowned of the fourth.

== Demographics ==
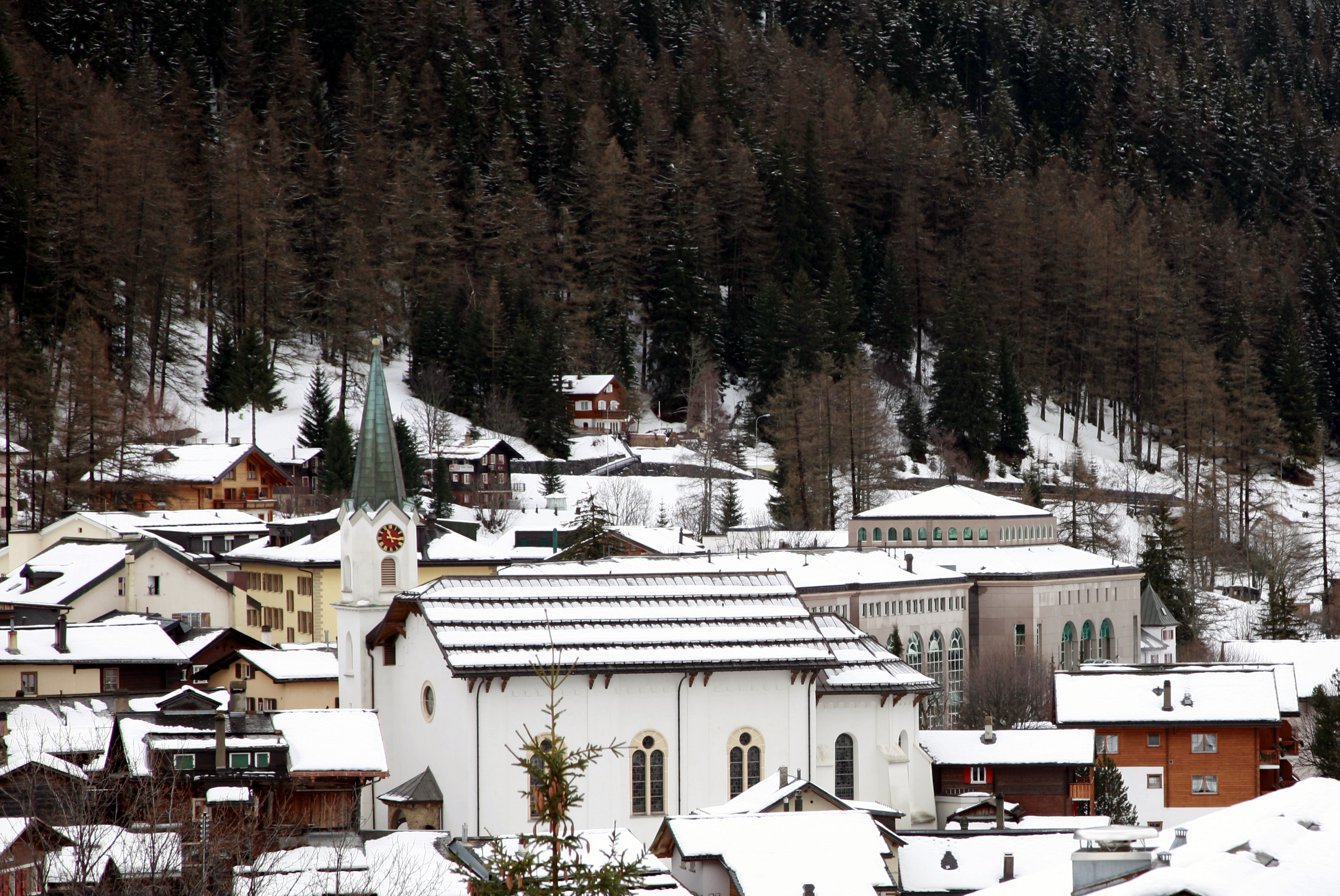
Leukerbad village

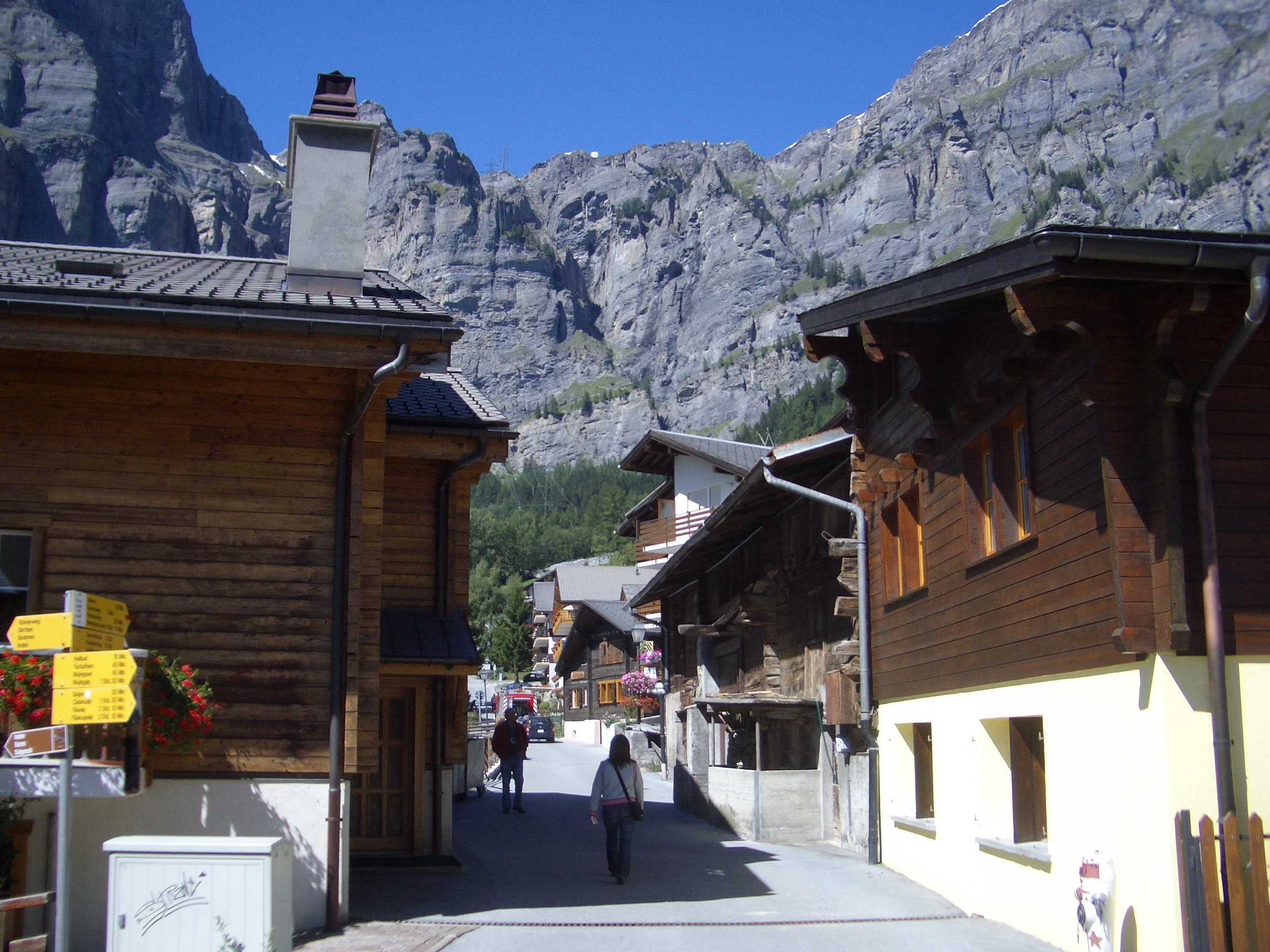
Street in Leukerbad

Leukerbad has a population (as of December 2020) of 1,329. As of 2008, 39.5% of the population are resident foreign nationals. Over the last 10 years (1999–2009) the population has changed at a rate of 0.9%. It has changed at a rate of -7.1% due to migration and at a rate of 6.3% due to births and deaths.

Most of the population (as of 2000) speaks German (1,185 or 82.8%) as their first language, French is the second most common (67 or 4.7%) and Portuguese is the third (53 or 3.7%). There are 33 people who speak Italian and 2 people who speak Romansh.

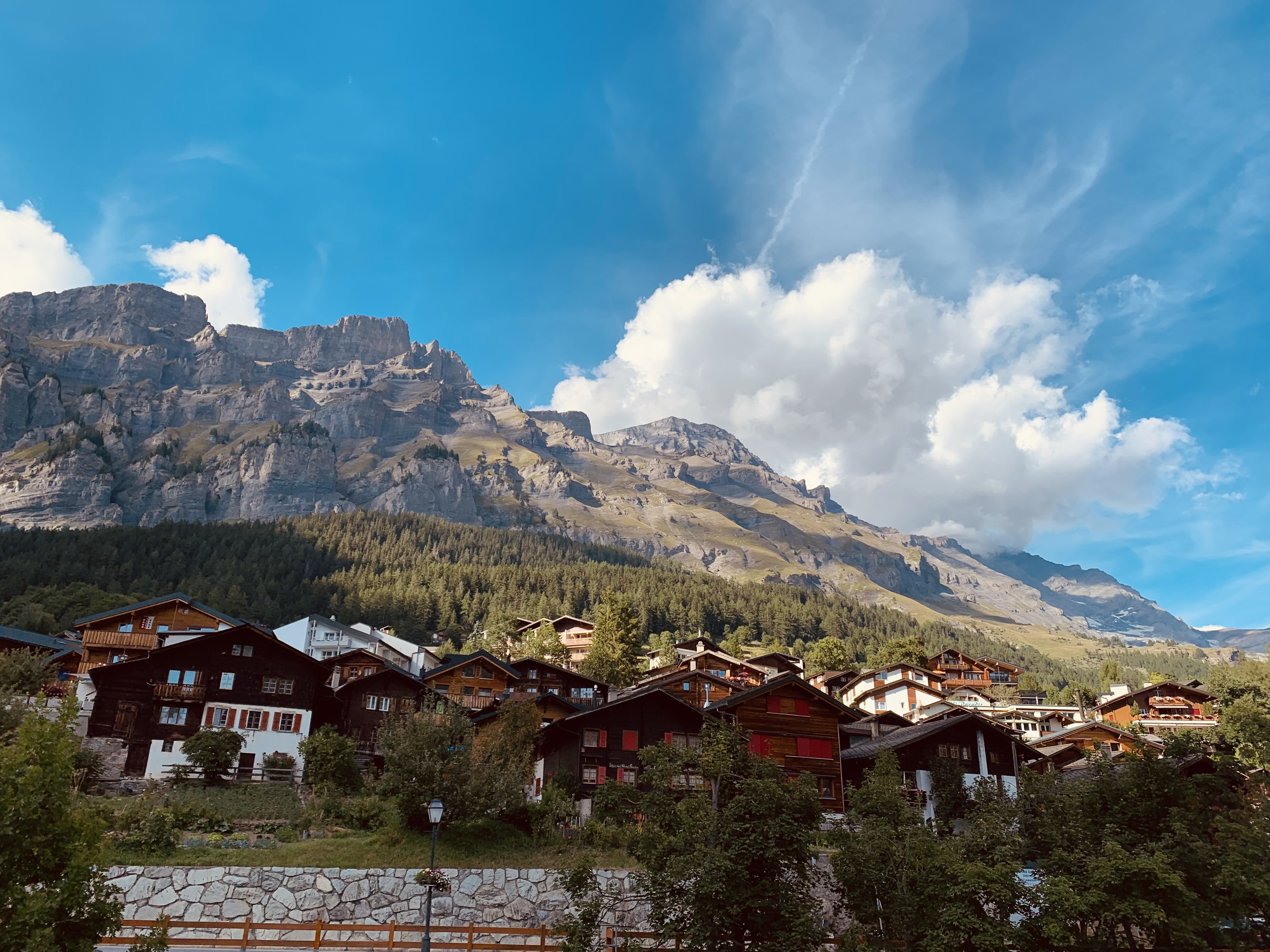
Street view in Leukerbad

As of 2008, the gender distribution of the population was 51.1% male and 48.9% female. The population was made up of 471 Swiss men (29.5% of the population) and 344 (21.6%) non-Swiss men. There were 506 Swiss women (31.7%) and 275 (17.2%) non-Swiss women. Of the population in the municipality 567 or about 39.6% were born in Leukerbad and lived there in 2000. There were 267 or 18.7% who were born in the same canton, while 268 or 18.7% were born somewhere else in Switzerland, and 287 or 20.1% were born outside of Switzerland.

The age distribution of the population (as of 2000) is children and teenagers (0–19 years old) make up 24% of the population, while adults (20–64 years old) make up 66.7% and seniors (over 64 years old) make up 9.4%.

As of 2000, there were 618 people who were single and never married in the municipality. There were 705 married individuals, 63 widows or widowers and 45 individuals who are divorced.

As of 2000, there were 568 private households in the municipality, and an average of 2.3 people per household. There were 199 households that consist of only one person and 27 households with five or more people. Out of a total of 627 households that answered this question, 31.7% were households made up of just one person and there were 3 adults who lived with their parents. Of the rest of the households, there are 139 married couples without children, 189 married couples with children. There were 32 single parents with a child or children. There were 6 households that were made up of unrelated people and 59 households that were made up of some sort of institution or another collective housing.

In 2000 there were 151 single family homes (or 29.4% of the total) out of a total of 513 inhabited buildings. There were 230 multi-family buildings (44.8%), along with 52 multi-purpose buildings that were mostly used for housing (10.1%) and 80 other use buildings (commercial or industrial) that also had some housing (15.6%).

In 2000, a total of 527 apartments (18.1% of the total) were permanently occupied, while 2,108 apartments (72.5%) were seasonally occupied and 274 apartments (9.4%) were empty. As of 2009, the construction rate of new housing units was 1.3 new units per 1000 residents.

The historical population is given in the following chart:

== Heritage sites of national significance ==
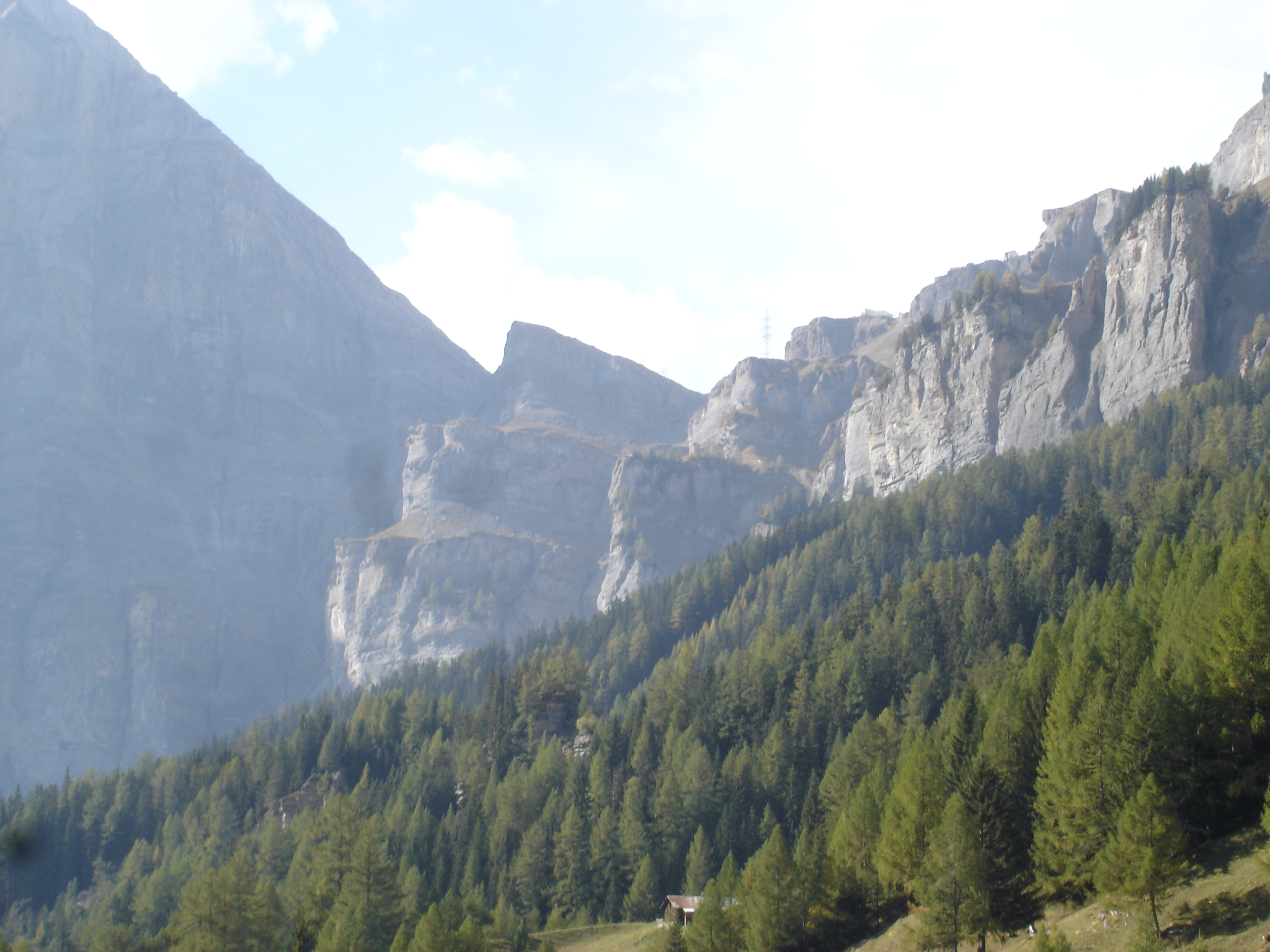
Gemmi Daubenwand

The Gemmi Daubenwand is listed as a Swiss heritage site of national significance.

== Twin Town ==
Leukerbad is twinned with the town of Dombóvár, Hungary.

== Politics ==
In the 2007 federal election the most popular party was the CVP which received 57.46% of the vote. The next three most popular parties were the SVP (23.56%), the SP (12.75%) and the FDP (3.94%). In the federal election, a total of 449 votes were cast, and the voter turnout was 53.3%.

In the 2009 Conseil d'État/Staatsrat election a total of 415 votes were cast, of which 21 or about 5.1% were invalid. The voter participation was 51.8%, which is similar to the cantonal average of 54.67%. In the 2007 Swiss Council of States election a total of 432 votes were cast, of which 14 or about 3.2% were invalid. The voter participation was 51.3%, which is much less than the cantonal average of 59.88%.

== Economy ==
As of 2010, Leukerbad had an unemployment rate of 3.1%. As of 2008, there were 25 people employed in the primary economic sector and about 14 businesses involved in this sector. 56 people were employed in the secondary sector and there were 15 businesses in this sector. 1,170 people were employed in the tertiary sector, with 124 businesses in this sector. There were 865 residents of the municipality who were employed in some capacity, of which females made up 50.1% of the workforce.

In 2008 the total number of full-time equivalent jobs was 1,102. The number of jobs in the primary sector was 13, all of which were in agriculture. The number of jobs in the secondary sector was 54 of which 11 or (20.4%) were in manufacturing, 1 was in mining and 42 (77.8%) were in construction. The number of jobs in the tertiary sector was 1,035. In the tertiary sector; 104 or 10.0% were in wholesale or retail sales or the repair of motor vehicles, 32 or 3.1% were in the movement and storage of goods, 511 or 49.4% were in a hotel or restaurant, 10 or 1.0% were the insurance or financial industry, 2 or 0.2% were technical professionals or scientists, 31 or 3.0% were in education and 182 or 17.6% were in health care.

In 2000, there were 328 workers who commuted into the municipality and 69 workers who commuted away. The municipality is a net importer of workers, with about 4.8 workers entering the municipality for every one leaving. Of the working population, 5.1% used public transportation to get to work, and 18% used a private car.

== Religion ==
From the 2000 census, 1,107 or 77.4% were Roman Catholic, while 138 or 9.6% belonged to the Swiss Reformed Church. Of the rest of the population, there were 63 members of an Orthodox church (or about 4.40% of the population), there was 1 individual who belongs to the Christian Catholic Church, and there were 9 individuals (or about 0.63% of the population) who belonged to another Christian church. There were 12 (or about 0.84% of the population) who were Islamic. There were 2 individuals who were Buddhist. 40 (or about 2.80% of the population) belonged to no church, are agnostic or atheist, and 62 individuals (or about 4.33% of the population) did not answer the question.

== Education ==
In Leukerbad about 553 or (38.6%) of the population have completed non-mandatory upper secondary education, and 133 or (9.3%) have completed additional higher education (either university or a Fachhochschule). Of the 133 who completed tertiary schooling, 46.6% were Swiss men, 29.3% were Swiss women, 12.8% were non-Swiss men and 11.3% were non-Swiss women.

During the 2010–2011 school year there were a total of 169 students in the Leukerbad school system. The education system in the Canton of Valais allows young children to attend one year of non-obligatory kindergarten. During that school year, there were two kindergarten classes (KG1 or KG2) and 25 kindergarten students. The canton's school system requires students to attend six years of primary school. In Leukerbad there were a total of seven classes and 123 students in the primary school. The secondary school program consists of three lower, obligatory years of schooling (orientation classes), followed by three to five years of optional, advanced schools. There were 46 lower secondary students who attended school in Leukerbad. All the upper secondary students attended school in another municipality.

As of 2000, there were 36 students in Leukerbad who came from another municipality, while 21 residents attended schools outside the municipality.

== Famous residents ==
- African American author James Baldwin lived in Leukerbad for three months. His experiences, which include reflections on racial identity and being likely the first black man the residents of Leukerbad encountered in person, are recounted in the essay Stranger in the Village, from his 1955 collection Notes of a Native Son.
