= Pointe de la Plaine Morte =

Mountain in Switzerland

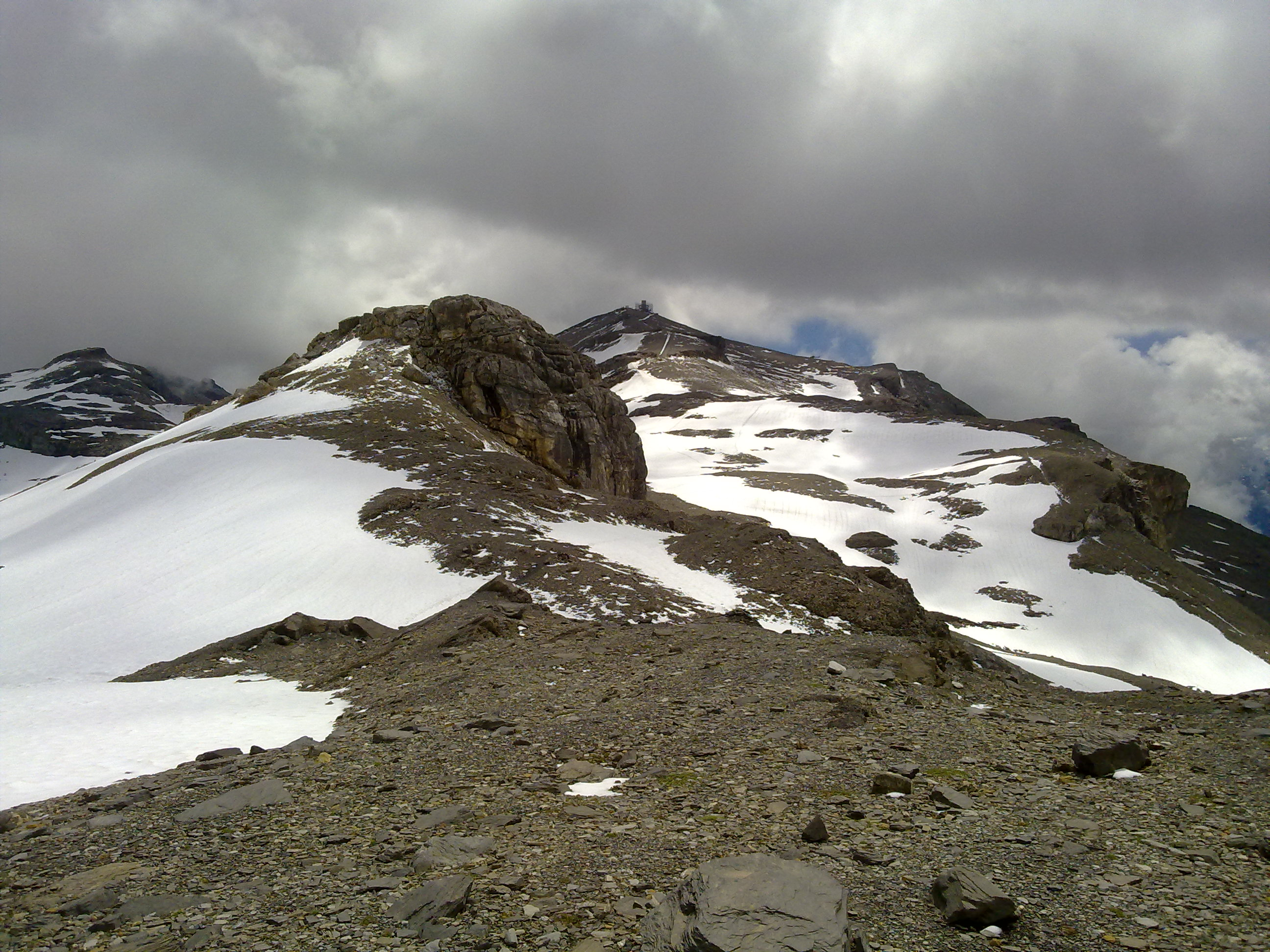
- Pointe de la Plaine Morte (centre) from the north

Highest point
- Elevation: 2,927 m (9,603 ft)
- Prominence: 87 m (285 ft)
- Parent peak: Sex Mort (2,935 m)
- Coordinates: 46°22′15″N 07°29′13″E

Geography
- Location within Switzerland
- Location: Bern/Valais, Switzerland
- Parent range: Bernese Alps

The Pointe de la Plaine Morte (2,927 metres (9,603 ft)) is a mountain of the Bernese Alps, located on the border between the Swiss cantons of Bern and Valais. It overlooks the large and flat glacier named Plaine Morte Glacier, from the south-west side.

The Pointe de la Plaine Morte is part of the Crans-Montana ski area and can be easily accessed by a cable car via Les Violettes. The upper terminus is located east of the summit at a height of 2,882 metres (9,455 ft). Only a short walk is necessary to reach the summit.

On the summit, there is a radar installation that has been operated by MeteoSwiss since 2014.

== Gallery ==
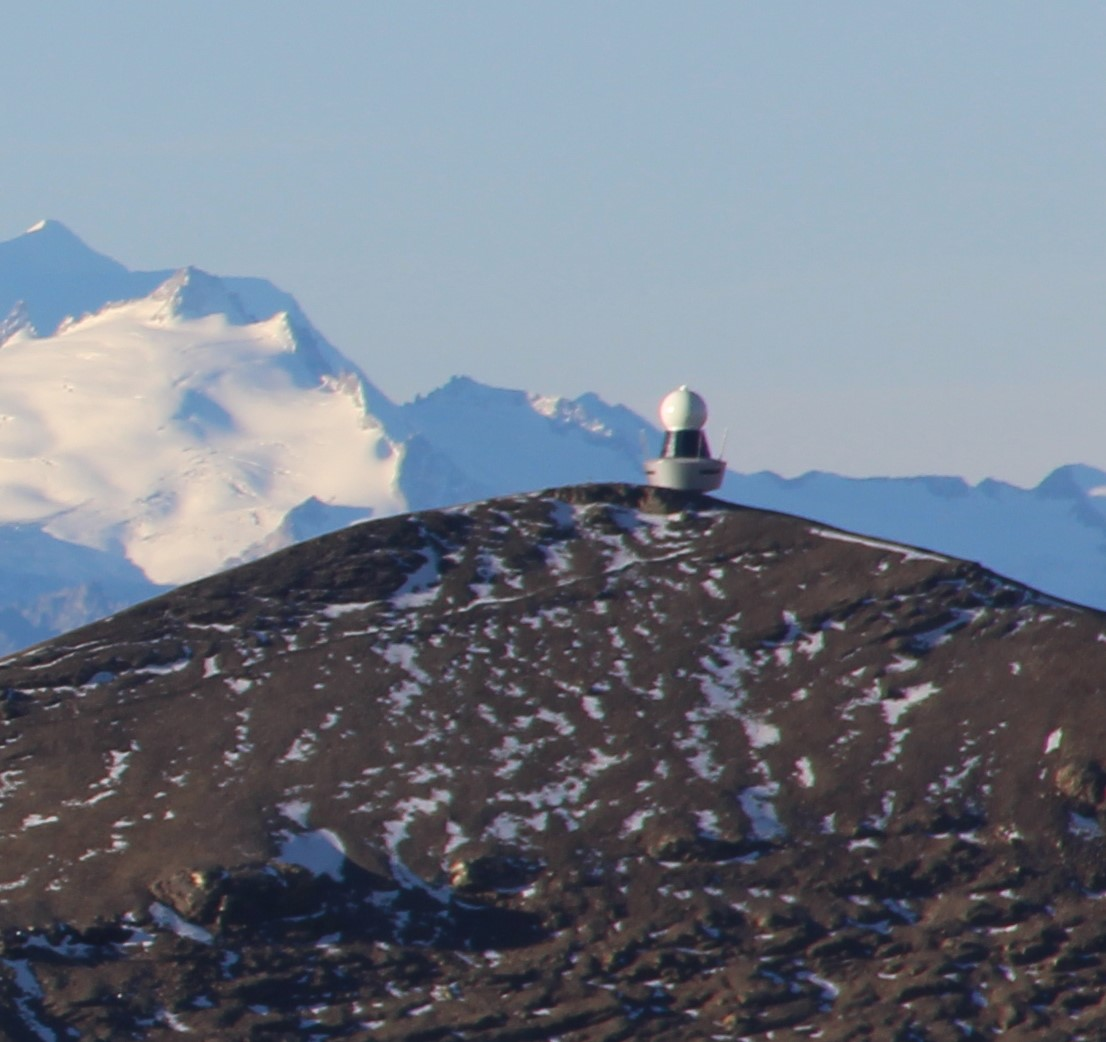
MeteoSwiss weather radar.

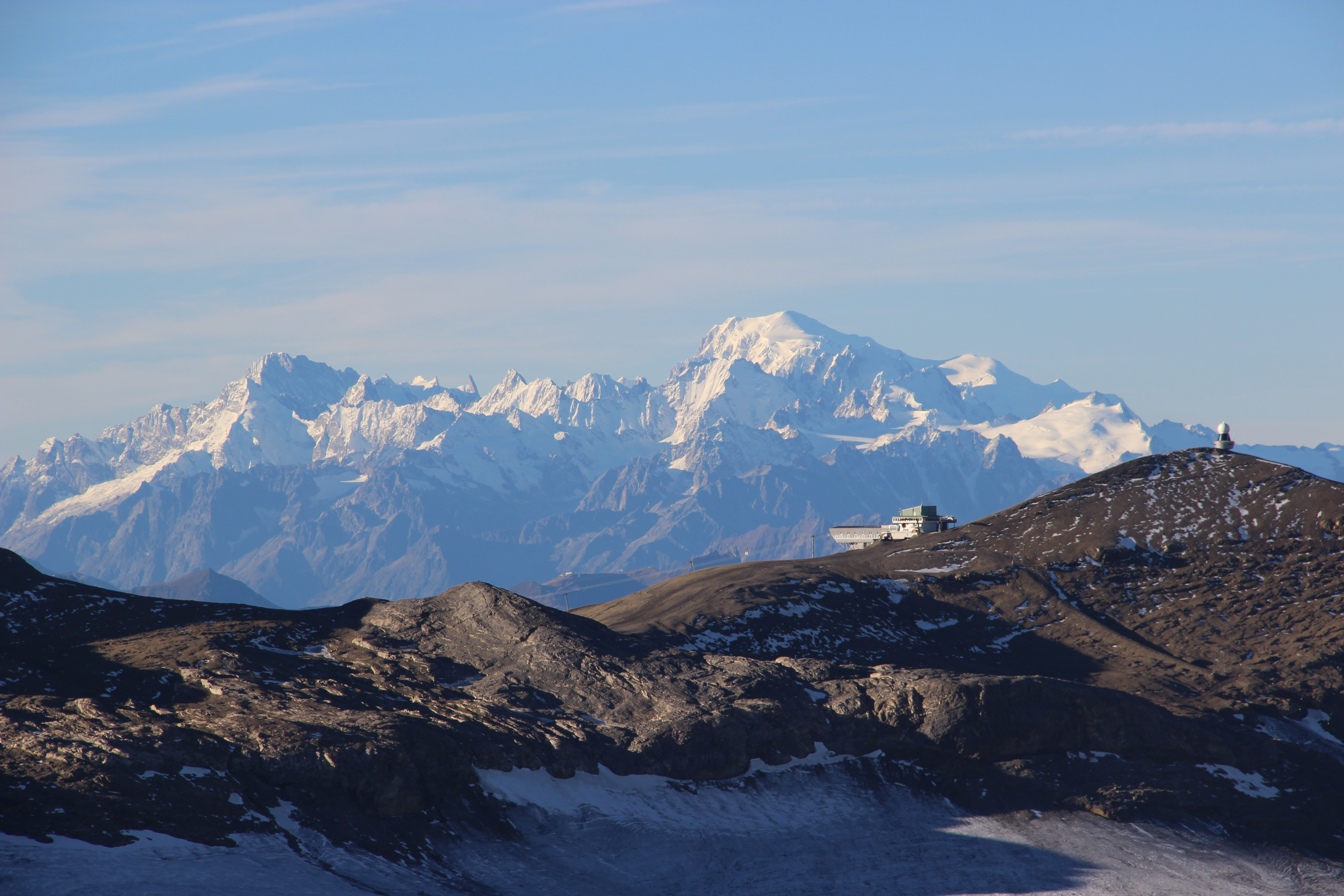
View of the Pointe with Mont Blanc and Grandes Jorasses in the background.

== See also ==
- List of mountains of Switzerland accessible by public transport
