= V-cableway =

Swiss gondola cableway

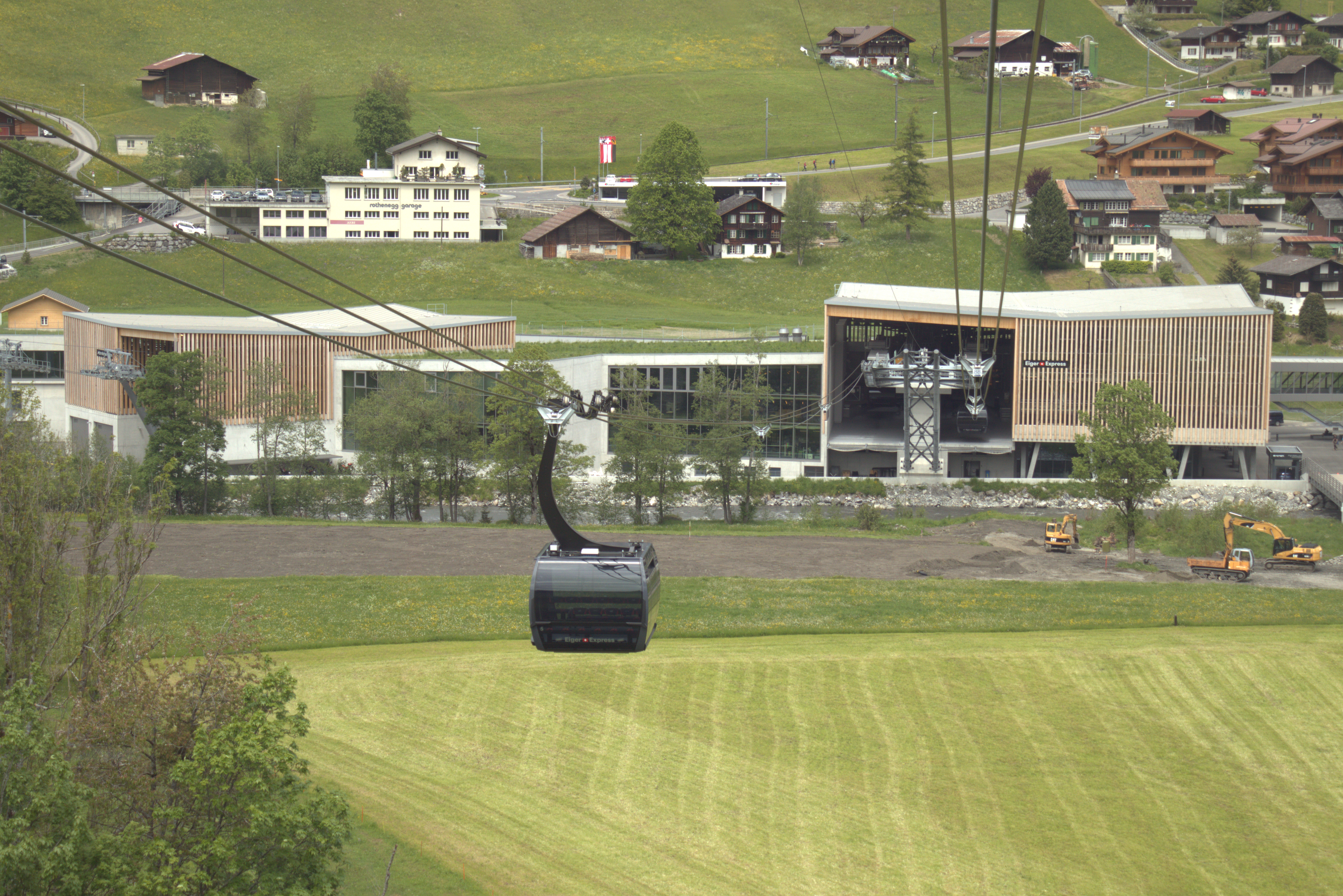
Grindelwald Terminal housing the new rail station, Eiger Express, and the Männlichen gondola cableways

The V-cableway is a gondola cableway with a shared base station at Grindelwald; it has one route to Männlichen and another to Eigergletscher railway station. It was built by Jungfraubahn AG.

== Project ==
The project had two aims. Firstly it was to replace the Grindelwald–Männlichen gondola cableway, which dated from 1978, with a larger capacity gondola service which would reduce journey times to Männlichen by 12 minutes. Secondly it was to reduce the travel time to Jungfraujoch via direct connection–the Eiger Express–from a new station on the Berner Oberland Bahn at Rothenegg to Eigergletscher railway station.

Construction started in the summer of 2018, and the CHF 400m project was completed in 2020.

== Completed projects ==
- Grindelwald Terminal new station
- Eiger Express
- Männlichen
- Eigergletscher Station expansion
