= Eiger Express =

Gondola cableway in Switzerland

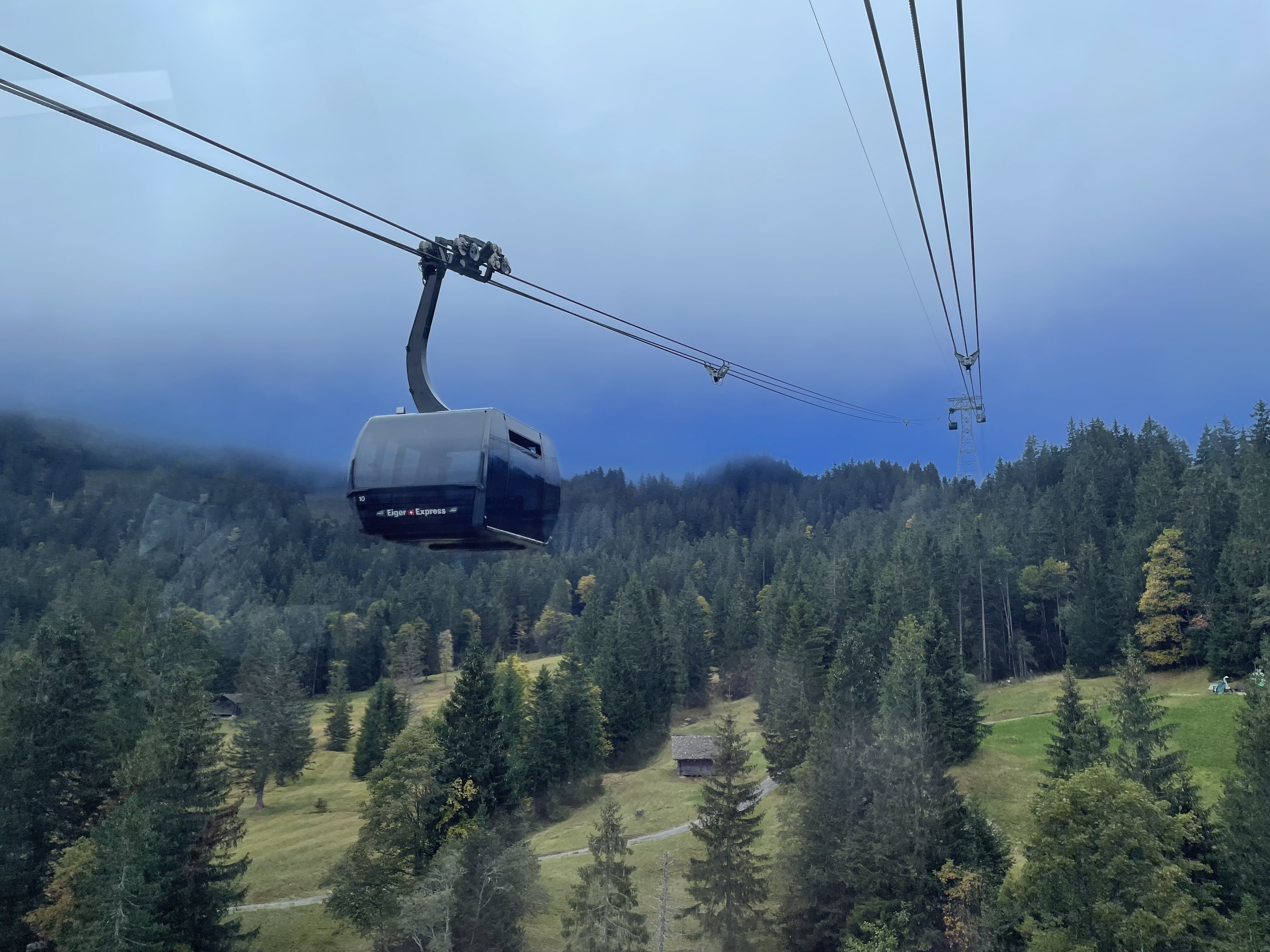
- Eiger Express gondola above Grindelwald
- Interactive map of Eiger Express

Overview
- Status: Operational
- Character: Recreational
- Location: Grindelwald, Bernese Oberland
- Country: Switzerland
- Coordinates: 46.6247°N 8.0189°E
- Termini: Grindelwald Terminal; Eigergletscher Station
- Elevation: lowest: 947 m (3,107 ft) highest: 2,328 m (7,638 ft)
- Built by: Doppelmayr/Garaventa; LTW; Frey AG
- Construction cost: 470million CHF
- Open: December 6, 2020; 5 years ago
- Website: Official Website

Operation
- Operator: Jungfraubahn
- No. of carriers: 44
- Carrier capacity: 26 (per carrier)
- Trip duration: 15 min
- Fare: 64.- CHF July 2022

Technical features
- Aerial lift type: Tri-cable gondola detachable
- Manufactured by: Doppelmayr/Garaventa
- Line length: 6483m
- No. of support towers: 7

The Eiger Express is a tricable gondola lift linking Grindelwald with the Eigergletscher that opened in December 2020.

== History ==
The Eiger Express was constructed as part of a wider project known as V-cableway. This included a new station, Grindelwald Terminal, the replacement of the Männlichen cableway and the construction of the Eiger Express.

The project beginnings were formed back in 2008, when a replacement railway station for Kleine Schiedegg was explored to be underground. It was ultimately not pursued. A later project for a Y cableway was considered but abandoned in 2011. In 2012, the first plans for the V cableway were undertaken and in 2014 a vote took place in Grindelwald to decide if it should be built. The vote did not pass, however a second plan was approved in early 2015.

Planning permission was granted in 2015, however construction did not begin until April 2018 due to 17 objections needing to be rectified. A long running objection was from local man, and former Jungfraubahn employee Otto Kaufman, who demanded £750,000 in compensation. Ground was broken on 3 July 2018, and the project at that point had cost 12million CHF. In March 2019, tunnelling works on the Eiger were completed to allow for progress to continue during the year constructing the new station for Eigergletscher and skiing areas. From May 2020, the gondolas were constructed for the Eiger Express.

In December 2020, the Eiger Express opened. Due to the Covid-19 pandemic, the opening was a very limited attendance event with several executives and two eagles in attendance.

== Operation ==
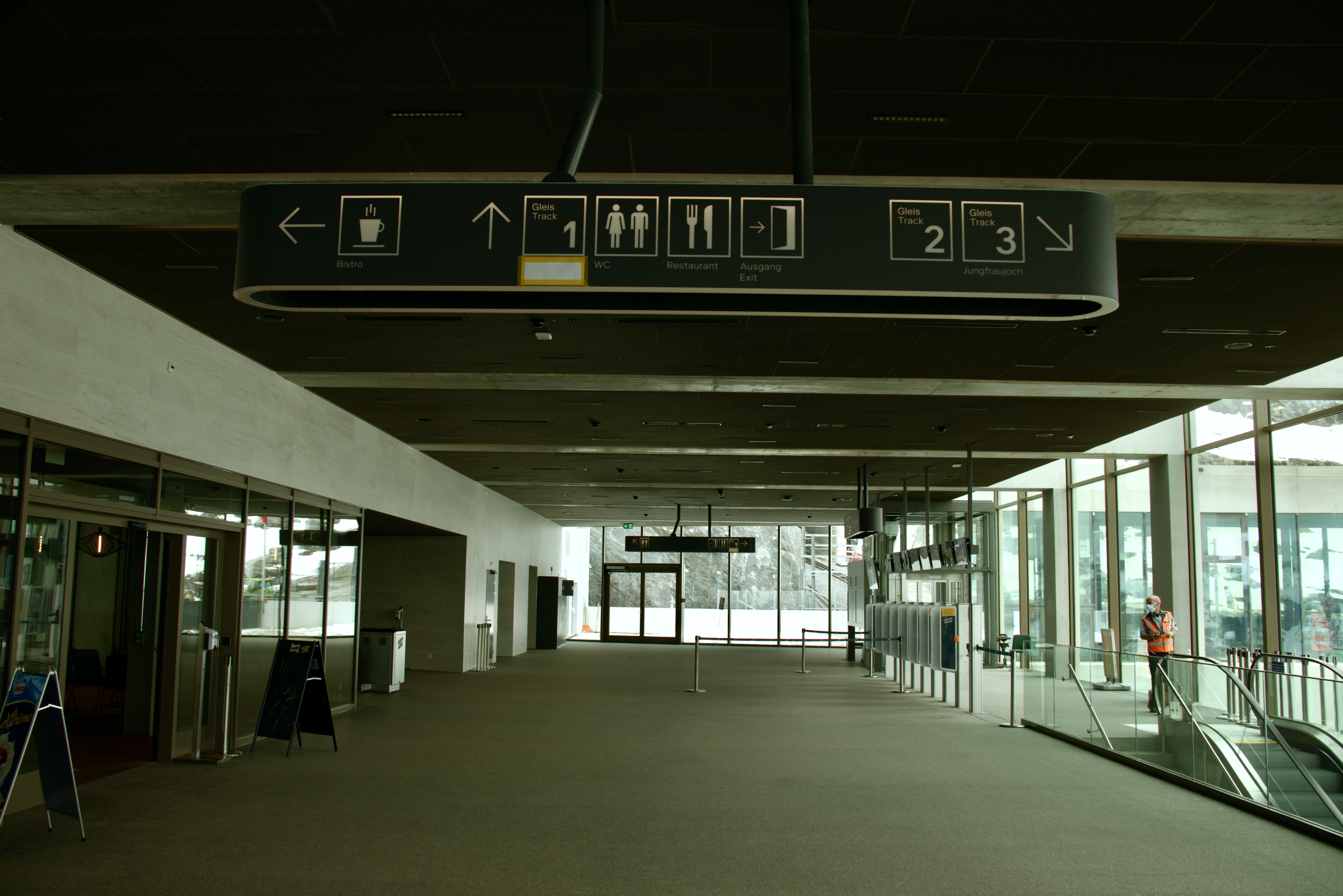
The passenger hall at Eigergletscher with visible ticket barriers to access the Jungfraujoch train to the right

The Eiger Express takes 15 minutes in total duration, travelling at 8 meters per second across a total distance of 6483 meters. The Eiger Express allows a faster access to the Jungfraujoch summit by 47 minutes. There are 44 gondolas, that can hold a maximum of 26 people. In addition, there is a VIP gondola numbered 888 which features a champagne bar in the centre of the cabin. There is a capacity of 2,200 people per hour to be transported. Due to the tri-cable system, there are only seven towers on the route, and the gondolas pass within 1800 meters of the Eiger north face.

Upon arrival at the gondola station, there is a new passenger hall that has been constructed to connect to the Eigergletscher railway station. Transfers to the Jungfraujoch train can be made, alongside exits for walkers and skiers. There is a bistro within the new building.
