= Jungfrau Railway =

Mountain cogwheel railway in Switzerland

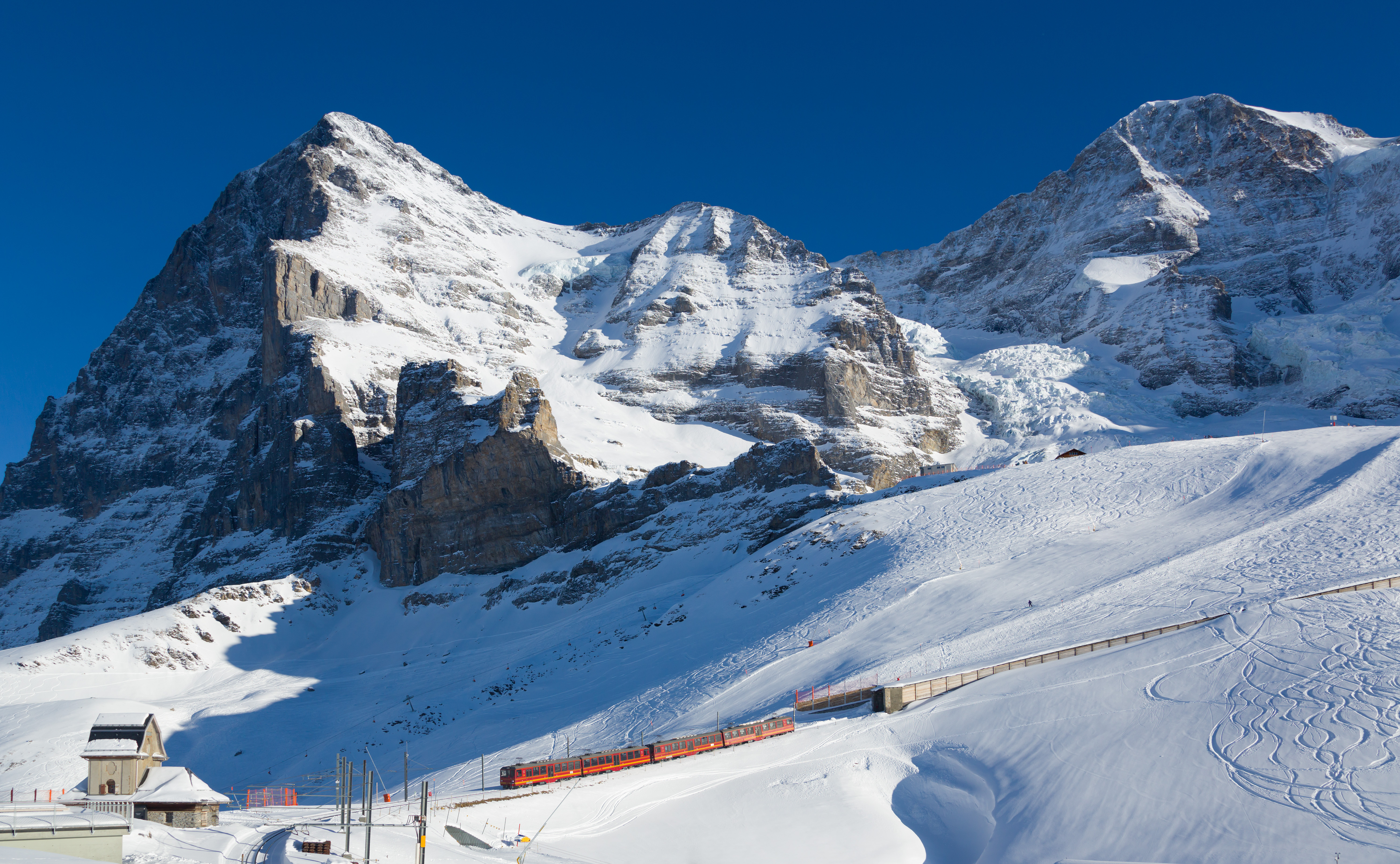
- Train on the open-air section of the line, overlooked by the Eiger and Mönch

Overview
- Native name: Jungfraubahn JB
- Status: operating daily
- Owner: Jungfraubahn AG
- Locale: Bern and Valais, Switzerland
- Termini: Kleine Scheidegg; Jungfraujoch railway station
- Stations: 5
- Website: JB

Service
- Type: Mountain rack railway
- Services: 1
- Operator(s): JB
- Depot(s): Kleine Scheidegg railway station
- Daily ridership: max. 1 Million p.a.

History
- Opened: 1912; 114 years ago

Technical
- Line length: 9.34 km (5.80 mi)
- Character: Touristic, mainly underground rack railway
- Rack system: Strub
- Track gauge: 1,000 mm (3 ft 3 3/8 in) metre gauge
- Minimum radius: 100 m (328.08 ft)
- Electrification: 3-phase, 1,125 V AC, 50 Hz, overhead wire
- Highest elevation: 3,454 m (11,332 ft)
- Maximum incline: 25%

The Jungfrau Railway (German: Jungfraubahn, Swiss Standard German pronunciation: [ˈjʊŋfraʊˌbaːn], JB) is a mountain rack railway in the Bernese Alps, Switzerland, connecting Kleine Scheidegg in the Bernese Oberland to the Jungfraujoch, across the Valais border. It is the highest railway in Switzerland and Europe, running 9 kilometres (5.6 mi) from the station of Kleine Scheidegg (2,061 m (6,762 ft)) to the Jungfraujoch (3,454 m (11,332 ft)), well above the perennial snow line. As a consequence, the railway runs essentially within the Jungfrau Tunnel, built into the neighbouring Eiger and Mönch, to protect the line from snow and extreme weather.

The Jungfrau Railway got its name from the highest of the three high peaks above it: the Jungfrau (English: Virgin; 4,158 metres (13,642 ft)), which was the initial goal of the project. A lift connecting the summit of the Jungfrau with an underground railway was planned. In 1912, the project ultimately ended at the Jungfraujoch, the saddle between the Mönch and Jungfrau. It was one of the highest railways in the world at the time of its inauguration.

At Kleine Scheidegg the Jungfrau Railway connects with the Wengernalpbahn (WAB), which has two routes down the mountain, running respectively to the villages of Lauterbrunnen and Grindelwald. From both villages, branches of the Berner Oberland-Bahn (BOB) connect to the Swiss Federal Railways at Interlaken.

The line is owned by the Jungfraubahn AG, a subsidiary of the Jungfraubahn Holding AG, a holding company that owns several mountain railways, cable railways, hotels, restaurants and travel agencies in the same region. Through that holding company it is part of the Allianz - Jungfrau Top of Europe marketing alliance, which also includes the separately owned Berner Oberland-Bahn and Schynige Platte-Bahn.

About 1 million tourists use the railway each year.

== History ==
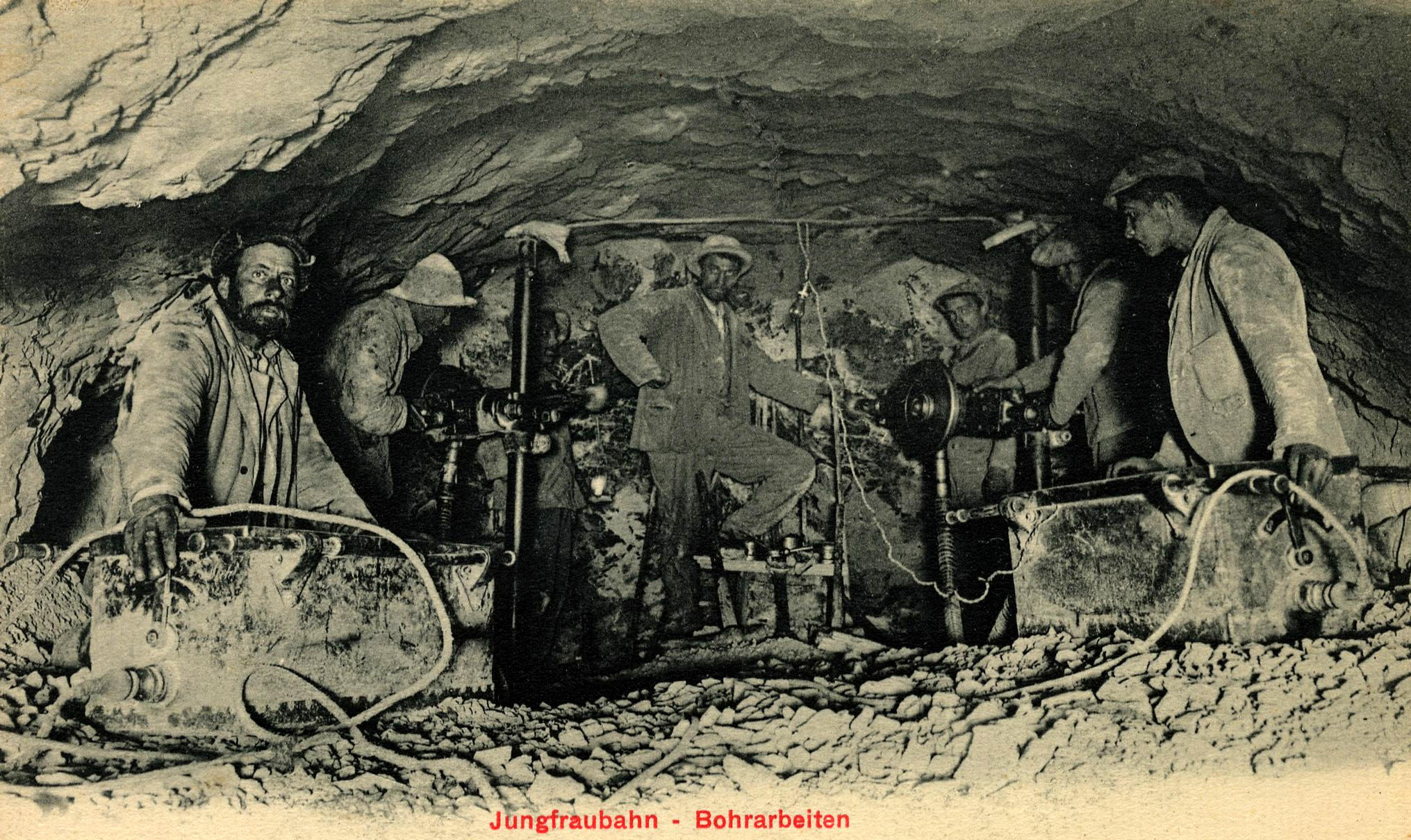
Construction of the Jungfrau Railway

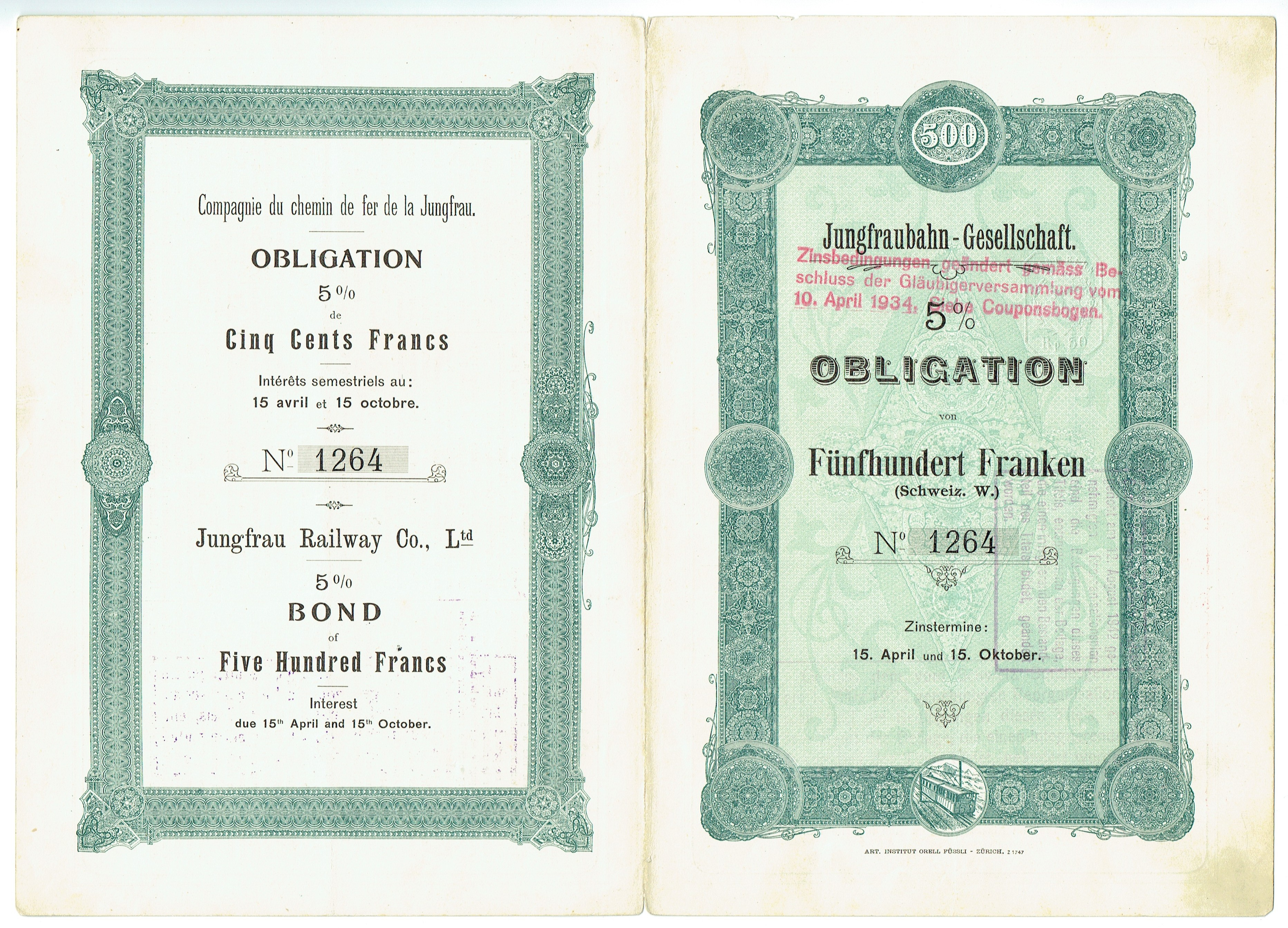
Bond of the Jungfrau Railway Company, issued 15 April 1900

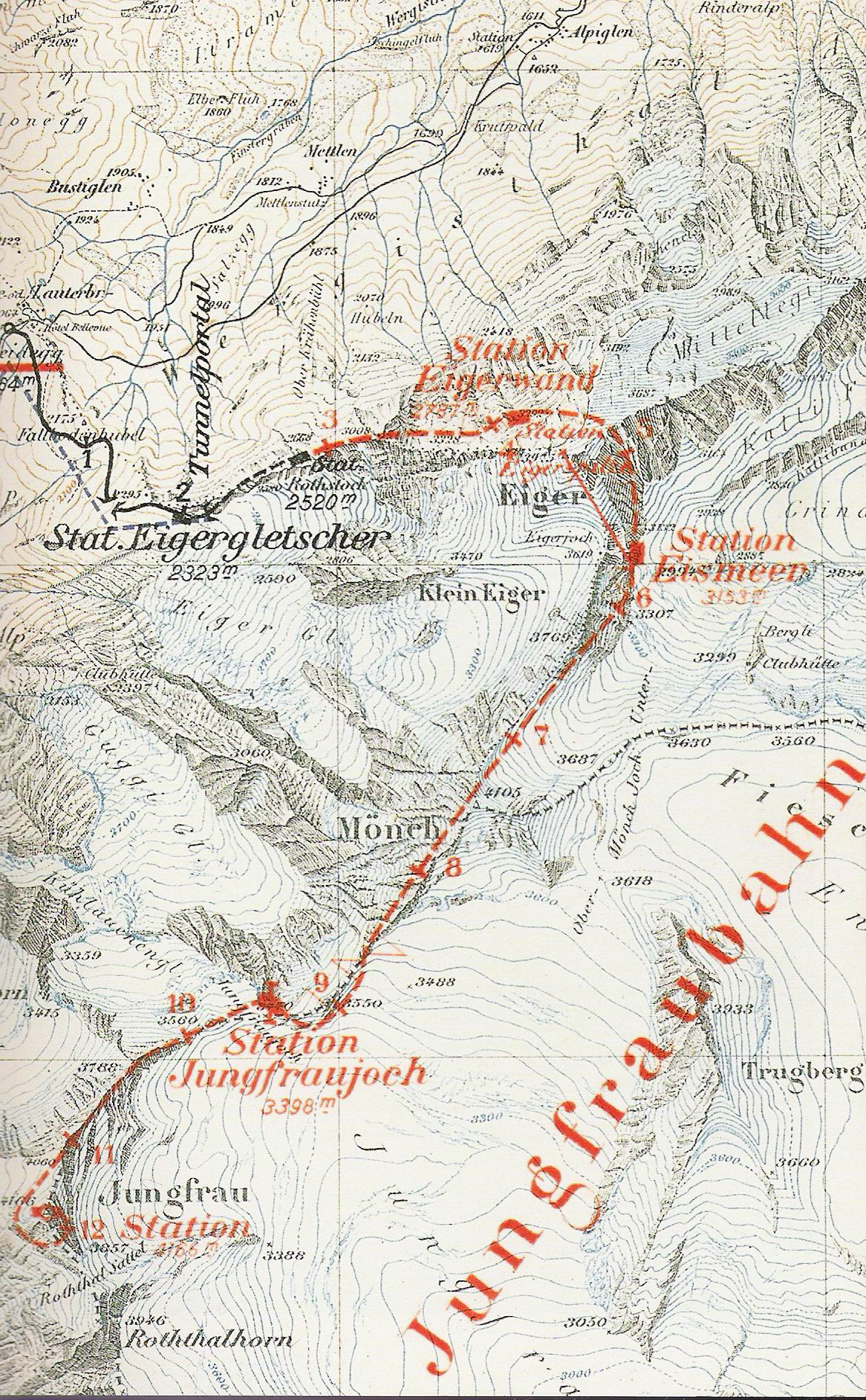
Map of the Jungfrau Railway project in 1903

- 1860 (approximately) – Many different plans for a mountain railway on the Jungfrau exist, but fail due to financial problems.
- 1894 – The industrialist Adolf Guyer-Zeller receives a concession for a rack railway, which begins from the Kleine Scheidegg railway station of the Wengernalpbahn (WAB), with a long tunnel through the Eiger and Mönch up to the summit of the Jungfrau.
- 1896 – Construction begins. Construction work proceeds briskly.
- 1898 – The Jungfrau Railway opens as far as the Eigergletscher railway station, at the foot of the Eiger.
- 1899 – Six workers are killed in an explosion. There is a four-month strike by workers. Adolf Guyer-Zeller dies in Zürich on 3 April. The section from Eigergletscher station to Rotstock station opens on 2 August.
- 1903 – The section from Rotstock station to Eigerwand station opens on 28 June.
- 1905 – The section from Eigerwand station to Eismeer station opens on 25 July.
- 1908 – There is an explosion at Eigerwand station.
- 1912 – On 21 February, sixteen years after work commenced, the tunneling crew finally breaks through the glacier in Jungfraujoch. Jungfraujoch station is inaugurated on 1 August.
- 1924 – "The house above the clouds" at Jungfraujoch is opened on 14 September.
- 1931 – The research station at the Jungfraujoch is opened.
- 1937 – The Sphinx Observatory is opened. A snowblower is purchased, resulting in year-round operation.
- 1942 – Company offices are relocated from Zürich to Interlaken.
- 1950 – The dome is installed on the Sphinx Observatory.
- 1951 – The adhesion section between Eismeer station and Jungfraujoch station is converted to rack operation.
- 1955 – A second depot at Kleine Scheidegg is constructed. The post office inaugurates its relay station on the Jungfraujoch.
- 1972 – The panoramic windows are installed at Eigerwand and Eismeer. The Jungfraujoch mountain house and tourist house are destroyed by fire on 21 October.
- 1975 – A new tourist house is opened.
- 1987 – A new mountain house is opened on 1 August.
- 1991 – A new station hall is opened at the Jungfraujoch.
- 1993 – The small Kleine Scheidegg depot is extended.
- 1996 – The covered observation deck at the Sphinx Observatory is opened.
- 1997 – The number of annual visitors exceeds 500,000 for the first time.
- 2000 – On 1 June, a daily record number of 8,148 visitors is achieved.
- 2016 – Eigerwand station is closed.

== Operations ==
The Jungfrau Railway has four operational stations, a previous station at Eigerwand having closed in 2016. The base station hub of Kleine Scheidegg is the highest starting point for a railroad in Europe, and the top terminus of Jungfraujoch is the highest railway station in Europe. The initial open-air section culminates just after Eigergletscher station, at around 2,350 metres, which makes the line the second highest open-air railway in Switzerland. The other station is Eismeer, located in the Jungfrau Tunnel, where passengers travelling towards Jungfraujoch can disembark for a short time to observe the neighbouring mountains through windows built into the east face of the Eiger, overlooking the Eismeer (the "sea of ice").

=== Stations ===
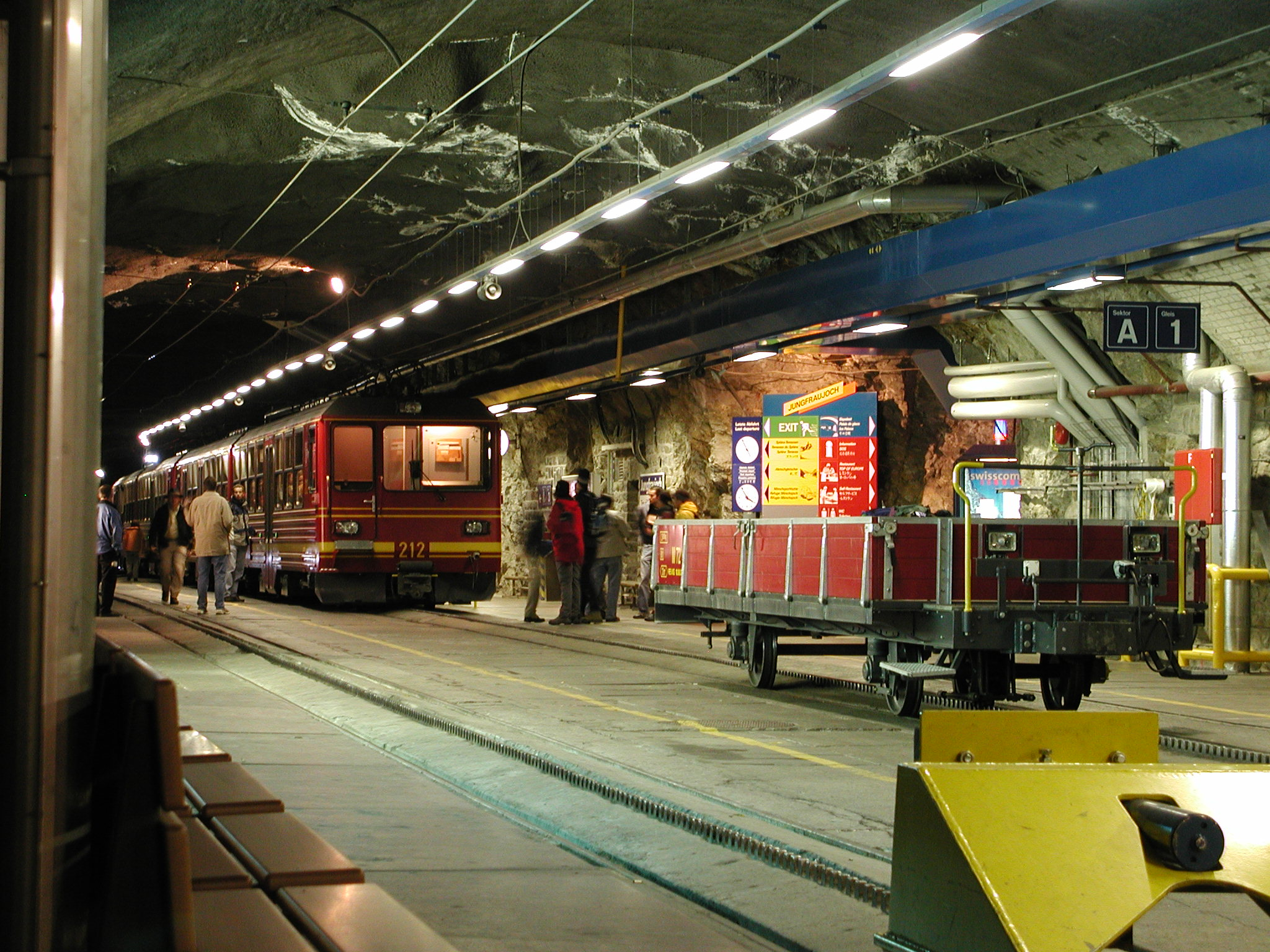
Jungfraujoch railway station on the Bern/Valais border

- Kleine Scheidegg, 2,061 m (6,762 ft)
- Eigergletscher, 2,320 m (7,612 ft)
- Eismeer, 3,158 m (10,361 ft).
- Jungfraujoch, 3,454 m (11,332 ft)

Additional locations along the line include Rotstock Station, at 2,520 m (8,268 ft), which was closed in 1903, and Stollenloch, a person-sized tunnel-opening which exits directly onto the north face of the Eiger.

=== Characteristics ===
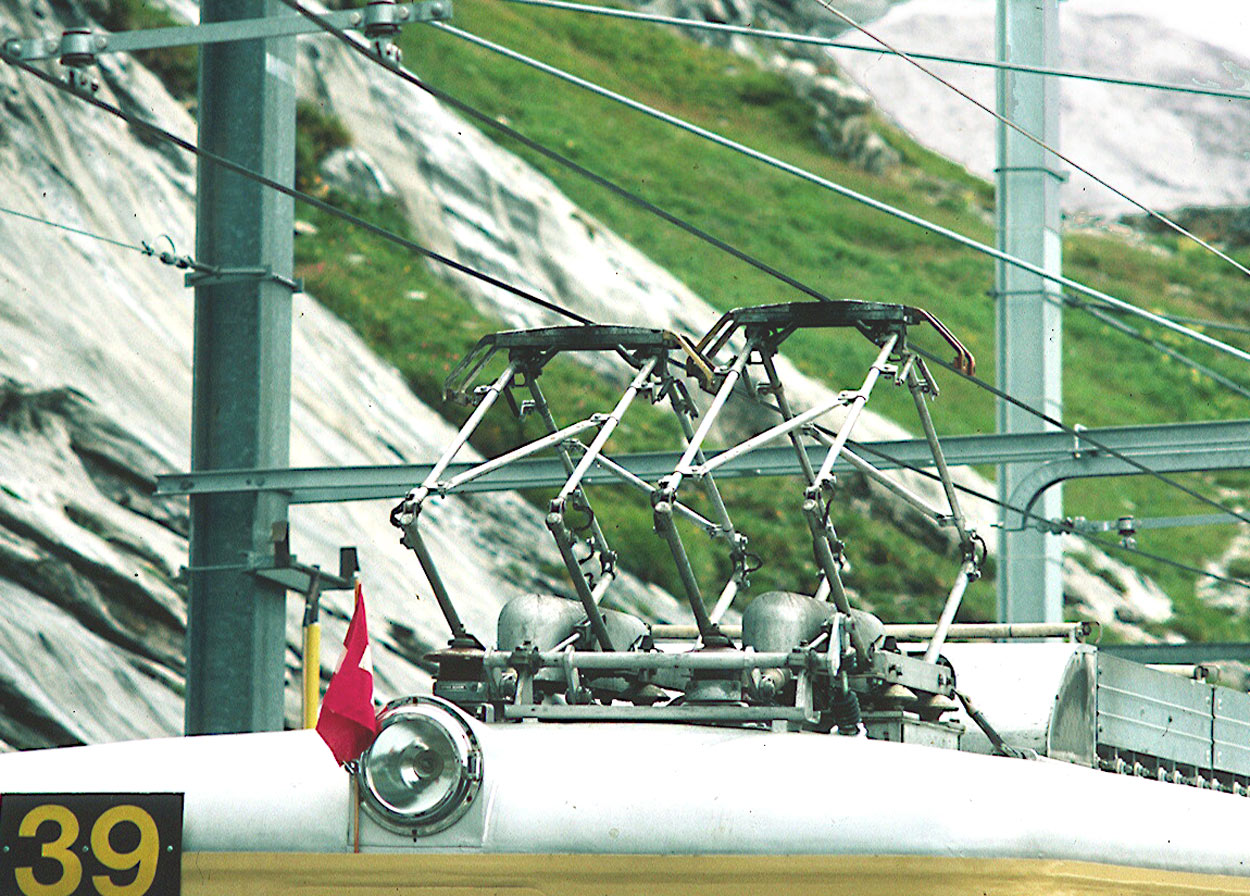
Close-up of pantographs atop a train on the Jungfrau Railway

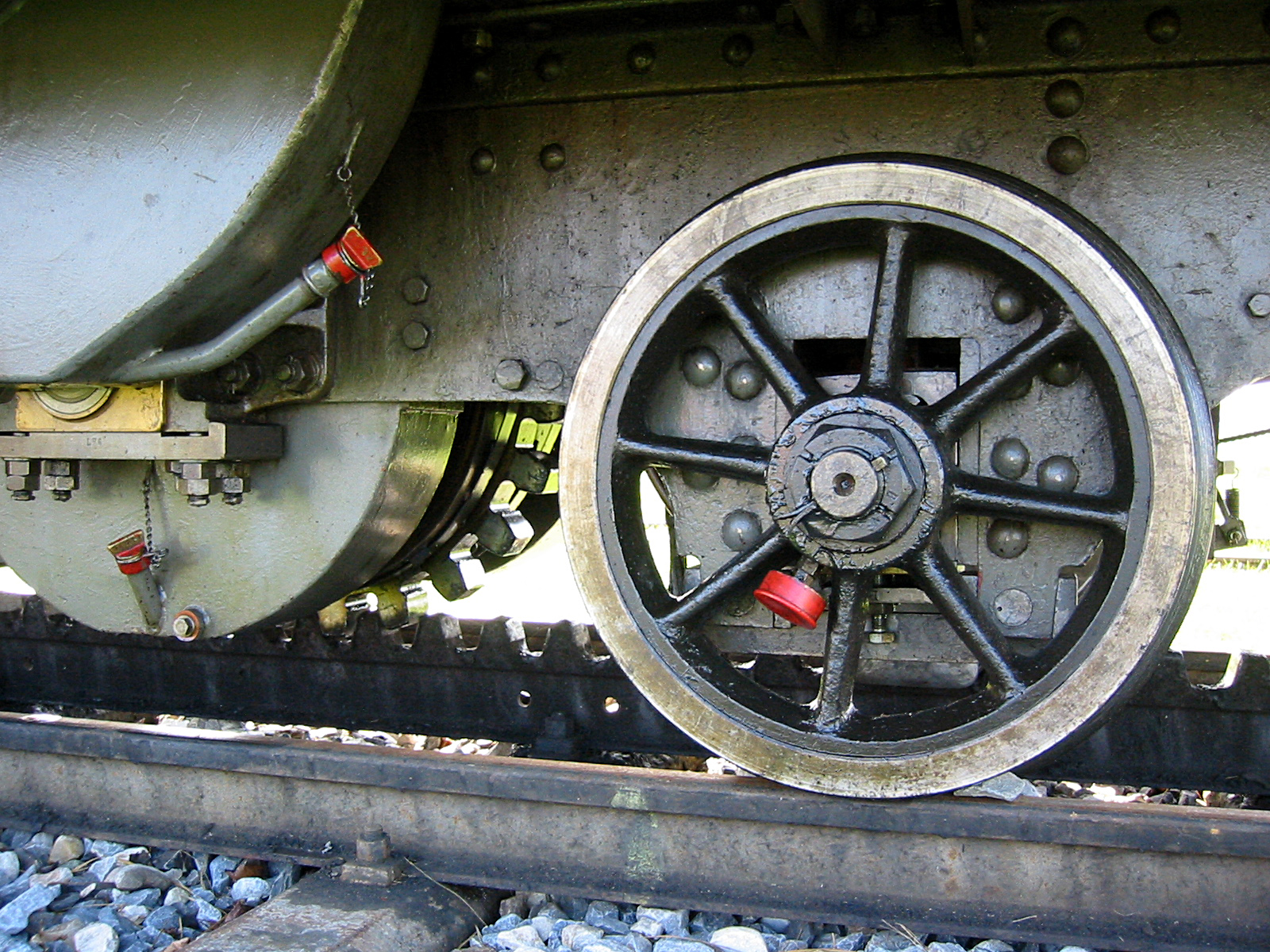
Strub rack system underneath a railcar (Rowan locomotive He 2/2 no. 6)

The line uses a 1,000 mm (3 ft 3 3/8 in) metre gauge and uses a Strub rack.

The Jungfrau Railway is electrified and one of only four lines in the world with three-phase electric power. The line runs using a 3-phase alternating current (AC) system which requires the trains to collect power from twin overhead wires using two pantographs (the third phase is earthed to the track).

Altitude (top station)	3,454 m (11,332 ft) above sea level
Elevation gain	1,393 m (4,570 ft)
Operational length	9.3 km (5.8 mi)
Gauge	1,000 mm (3 ft 3 3/8 in)
Rack rail type	Strub
Operational speed	12.5 kilometres per hour (7.8 mph) (25 kilometres per hour [16 mph] on shallower gradients, such as above Eismeer)
Steepest gradient	25%
Smallest curve radius	100 metres (330 ft)
Tunnels	3 tunnels: longest 7,122 metres (23,366 ft); shortest 110 metres (360 ft). Tunnels make up 80% of length of the entire railway.
Power system	3-phase, 50 Hz, 1,125 volts

=== Lift proposal and aerial cableway ===
In early 2008, Jungfraubahn Holding AG announced it was exploring the idea of an efficient fast form of access to the Jungfraujoch, using the world's longest tunnel-lift system, as an alternative to the rack railway. A feasibility study was undertaken to determine if and how such a system—for example, as a fast lift or funicular—from the Lauterbrunnen Valley to the Jungfraujoch could be realised without disturbing the unique landscape of the UNESCO World Heritage Site. These plans were abandoned and in 2017 the company announced plans to build an aerial cableway between Grindelwald Terminal, a new station on the Interlaken-Grindelwald line, and Eigergletscher from where the Jungfrau railway could be joined for the journey to the summit. This aerial cableway, known as the Eiger Express, opened to the public on 5 December 2020 and provides an alternative, faster way to access the Jungfraujoch from the valley.

== Rolling stock ==
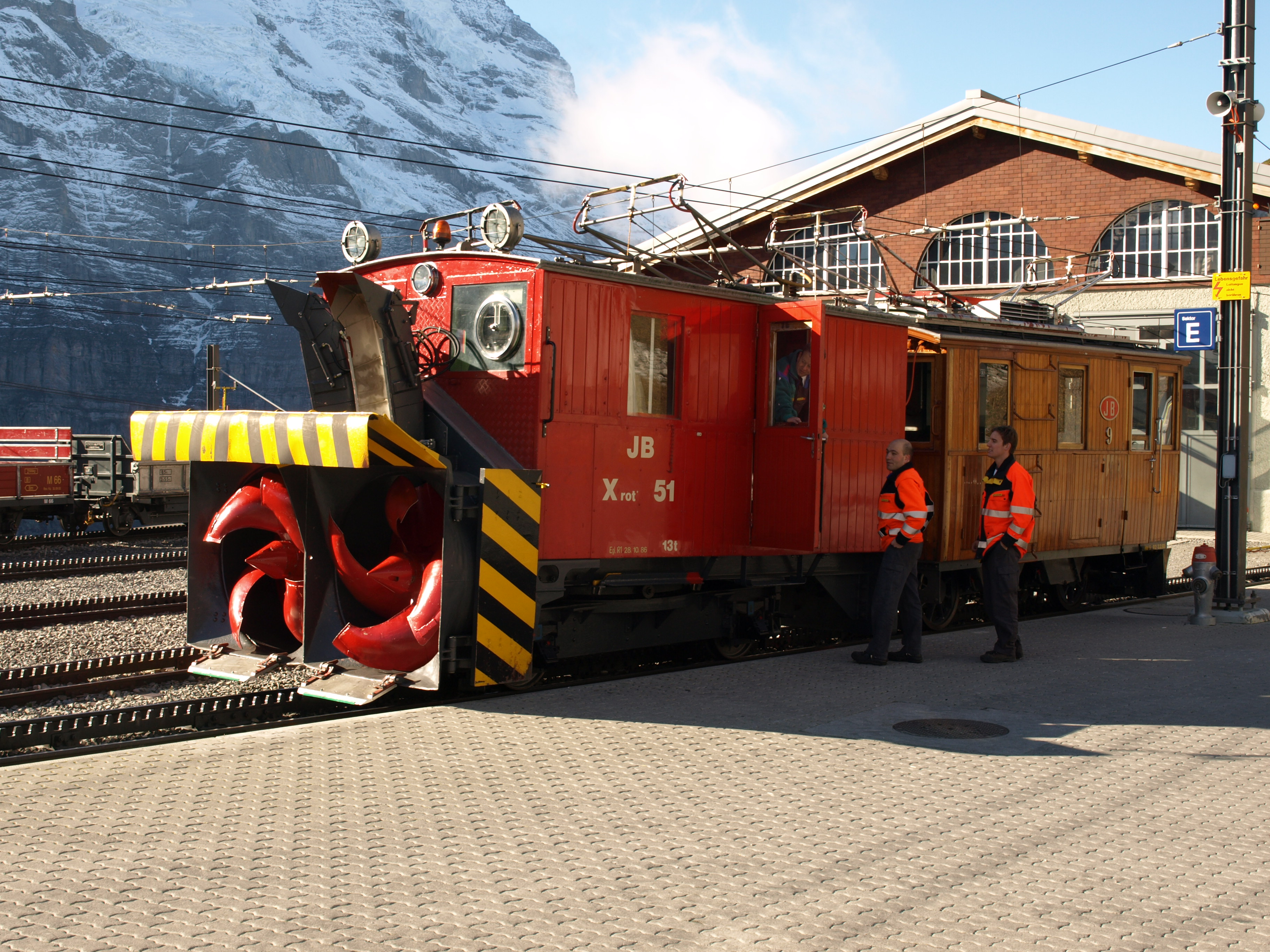
Snowblower at Kleine Scheidegg railway station

Since most of the railway is inside a tunnel, it was designed to be powered by electricity from conception. The current rolling stock consists of twin-unit motorcoaches carrying up to 230 people per train which operate at 12.5 kilometres per hour (7.8 mph) on the steepest parts of the ascent. The motors function at two speeds which allows the units to operate at double this speed on the less steep part of the ascent (above Eismeer station).

The motors operate in a regenerative mode which allows the trains to generate electricity during the descent, which is fed back into the power distribution system. Approximately 50% of the energy required for an ascent is recovered during the descent. This generation regulates the descent speed.

Motive power delivered since 1992 (numbers 211–224) no longer has directly-fed three-phase motors but is equipped similarly to a normal single-phase locomotive. This rolling stock can travel at variable speeds, which enabled a reduction in journey time from 52 to 35 min with the timetable starting 11 December 2016. Pre-1992 rolling stock can no longer be used in regular traffic and most of the earlier trains have been scrapped.

Snow clearing equipment is essential on the open section of line between Kleine Scheidegg railway station and Eigergletscher railway station. Originally snow ploughs were used, but more recently snow blowing equipment has been brought into service.

The railway also operates some dedicated freight vehicles to supply the visitor facilities at Jungfraujoch, including a tank to transport additional water.

== See also ==
- List of mountain railways in Switzerland
- Rail transport in Switzerland
- Wetterhorn Elevator, another ambitious project in the region aiming at the Wetterhorn
