= Grindelwald Terminal railway station =

Railway station in Switzerland

Grindelwald Terminal
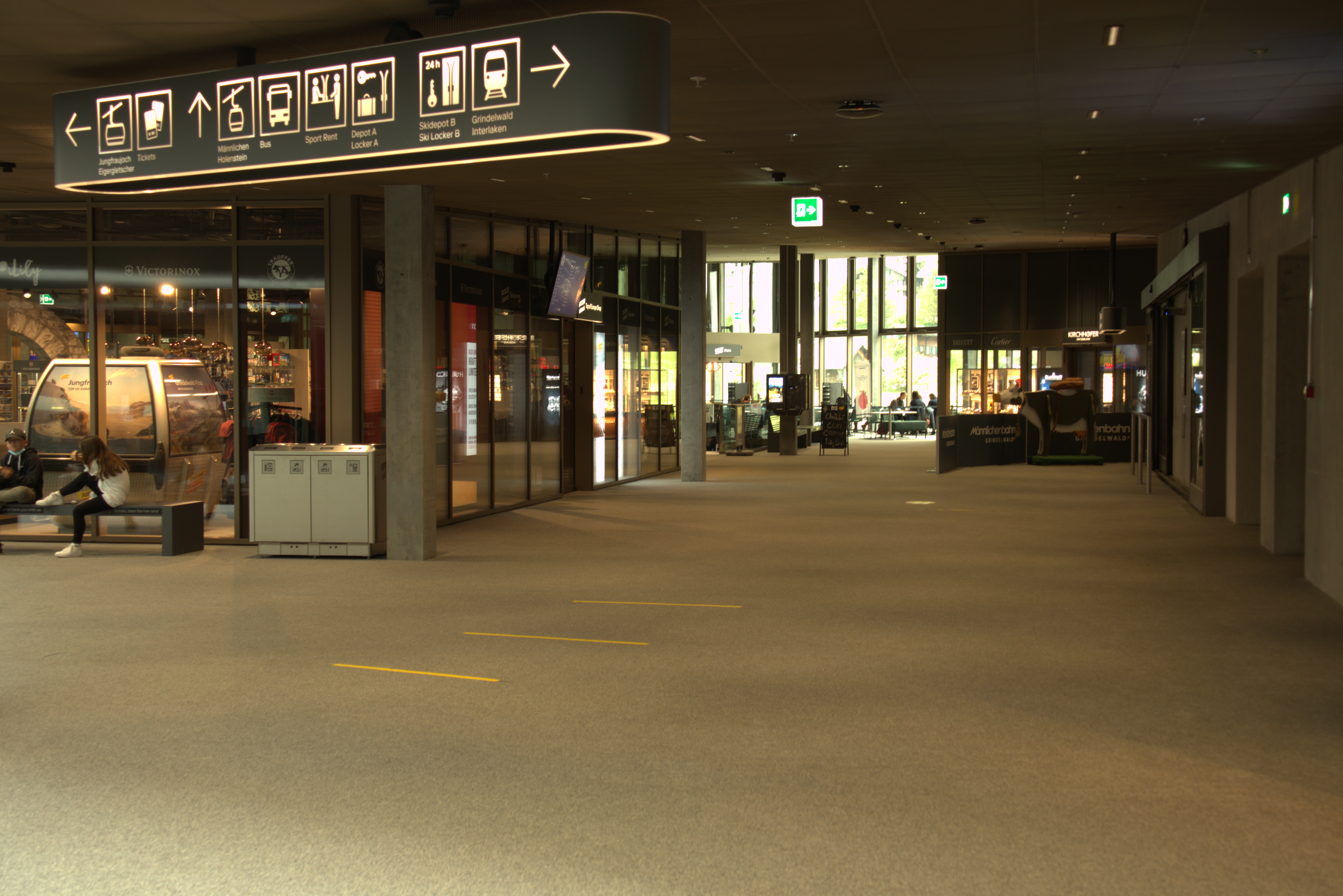
- Inside view

General information
- Location: Grindelwald, Bern; Switzerland
- Coordinates: 46°37′32″N 8°01′02″E
- Elevation: 947 m (3,107 ft)
- Owner: Berner Oberland-Bahnen
- Line: Bernese Oberland line
- Train operators: Berner Oberland-Bahnen
- Connections: Autoverkehr Grindelwald bus lines; Eiger Express; Grindelwald–Männlichen gondola cableway

Other information
- Fare zone: 821 (Libero)

History
- Opened: 13 December 2019

Services
Preceding station	Berner Oberland-Bahnen AG	Following station
Schwendi bei Grindelwald towards Interlaken Ost	Bernese Oberland Railway	Grindelwald Terminus
Location

Grindelwald Terminal railway station (German: Bahnhof Grindelwald Terminal) is a transportation complex in the municipality of Grindelwald in the Swiss canton of Bern. It is the valley station for two cableways: the Eiger Express to the Eiger Glacier, and the Grindelwald–Männlichen to the Männlichen. Trains on the Bernese Oberland line stop here as well, providing regular service to Interlaken Ost and Grindelwald.

The station opened in December 2019, along with the rebuilt Grindelwald–Männlichen cableway. The Eiger Express, some fifty minutes faster than the rail journey via Grindelwald and Kleine Scheidegg, opened in December 2020.

== Services ==
As of the December 2020 timetable change, the following services stop at Grindelwald Terminal:

- Regio: half-hourly service between Interlaken Ost and Grindelwald.
- Cableways:
  - Eiger Express: continuous service during the daytime to Eigergletscher.
  - Grindelwald–Männlichen: continuous service during the daytime to Männlichen.
