= Rotstock railway station =

Railway station in canton of Bern, Switzerland

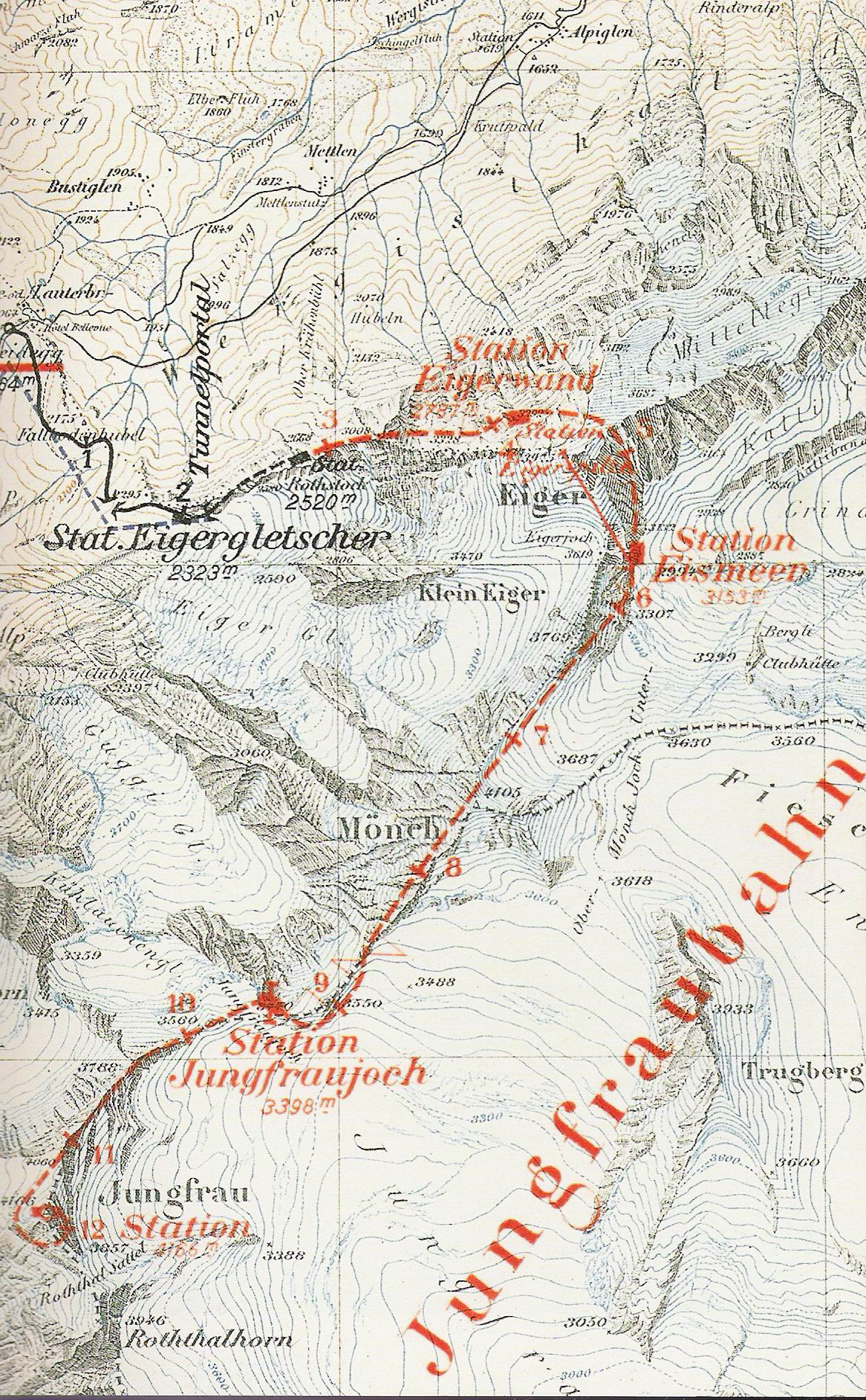
A map of the Jungfraubahn project in 1903 shows the already built station, here called Rothstock.

Rotstock, Rothstock or Rostock is a former underground railway station on the tunnelled section of the Jungfrau Railway in the Bernese Oberland region of Switzerland.

The station opened on 2 August 1899, with the extension of the Jungfraubahn from its previous terminus at Eigergletscher station. After further construction, the line was extended to Eigerwand station on 28 June 1903. Today, all that remains of the station is a door that leads into the open.
