= Eigerwand railway station =

Railway station in Switzerland

Eigerwand
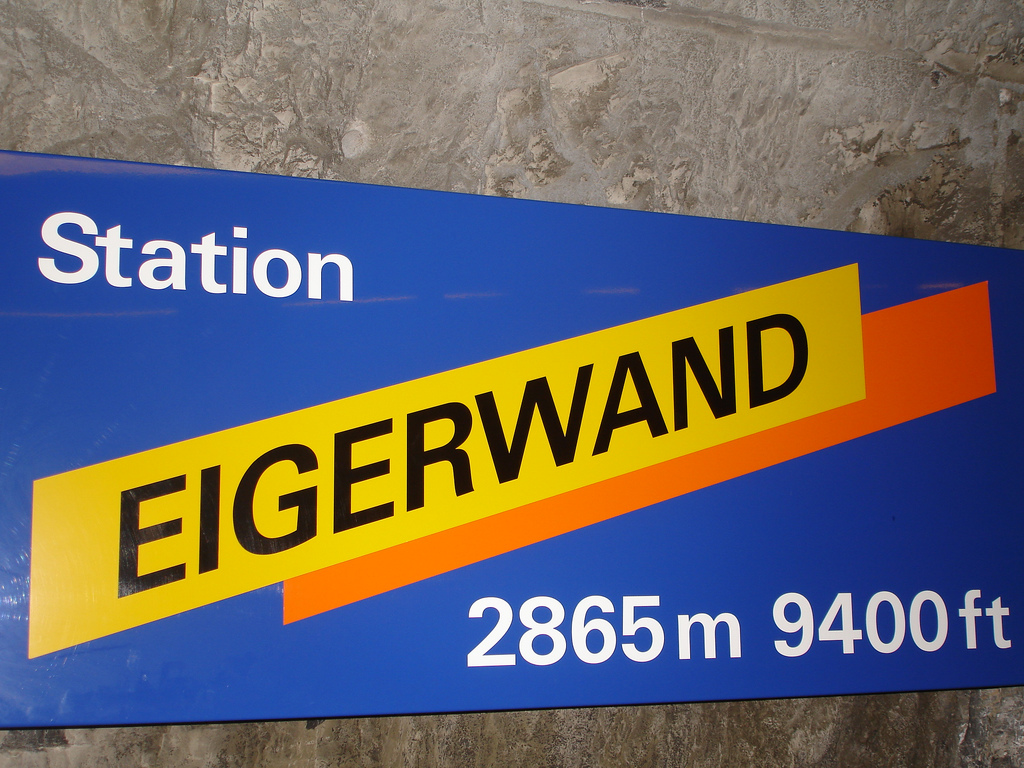

General information
- Location: Eigerwand; Grindelwald, Bern; Switzerland
- Coordinates: 46°34′52″N 08°00′13″E
- Elevation: 2,864 m (9,396 ft)
- Line: Jungfraubahn

History
- Opened: 28 June 1903; 123 years ago
- Closed: 2016; 10 years ago

Services
Preceding station	Jungfraubahn AG	Following station
Eigergletscher towards Kleine Scheidegg	Jungfrau Railway	Eismeer towards Jungfraujoch
Location
- Location within Switzerland

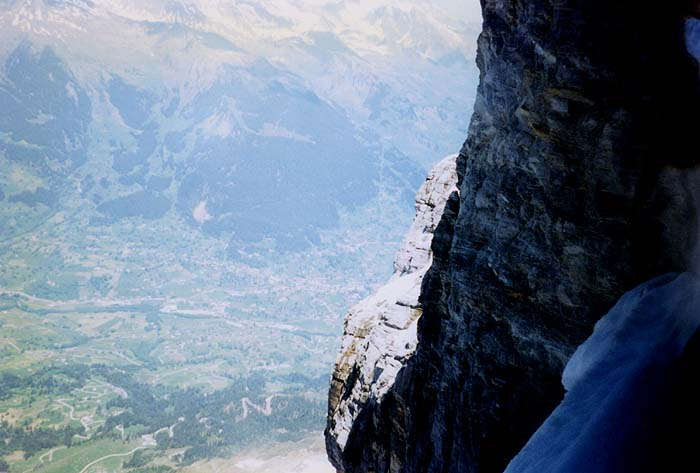
Grindelwald seen from the Eigerwand window

Eigerwand is a disused underground railway station in the municipality of Grindelwald in the canton of Bern, Switzerland. It is on the Jungfrau railway, which runs to the Jungfraujoch from Kleine Scheidegg. The station is located just behind the north wall of the Eiger and its principal purpose was to allow passengers to observe the view through a series of windows carved into the rock face. Trains to Jungfraujoch used to stop at the station for a few minutes for this purpose, but those descending to Kleine Scheidegg did not stop.

The only access to the station other than by train is a door in the sheer face of the mountain. This has, on occasion, been used to rescue mountaineers stranded on the mountain, most famously during the 1936 Eiger north face climbing disaster. It features in this capacity in the 1975 film The Eiger Sanction. It lies close to the Stollenloch, an exit and unofficial stop which is sometimes used by mountaineers to bypass the lower approach of the North Face.

The station opened on 28 June 1903, with the extension of the Jungfraubahn from its previous temporary terminus at Rotstock station. After further construction, the line was extended to Eismeer station on 25 July 1905, and Eigerwand became an intermediate stop.

The station closed in late 2016 following the introduction of new, faster rolling stock which allowed the service frequency on the line to be improved.

Prior to its closure, the following passenger trains operated:

Operator	Train Type	Route	Typical Frequency	Notes
Jungfraubahn		Kleine Scheidegg - Eigergletscher - Eigerwand - Eismeer - Jungfraujoch	2 per hour	Uphill trains only

== See also ==
- List of highest railway stations in Switzerland
