= Eigergletscher railway station =

Railway station in Switzerland

Eigergletscher
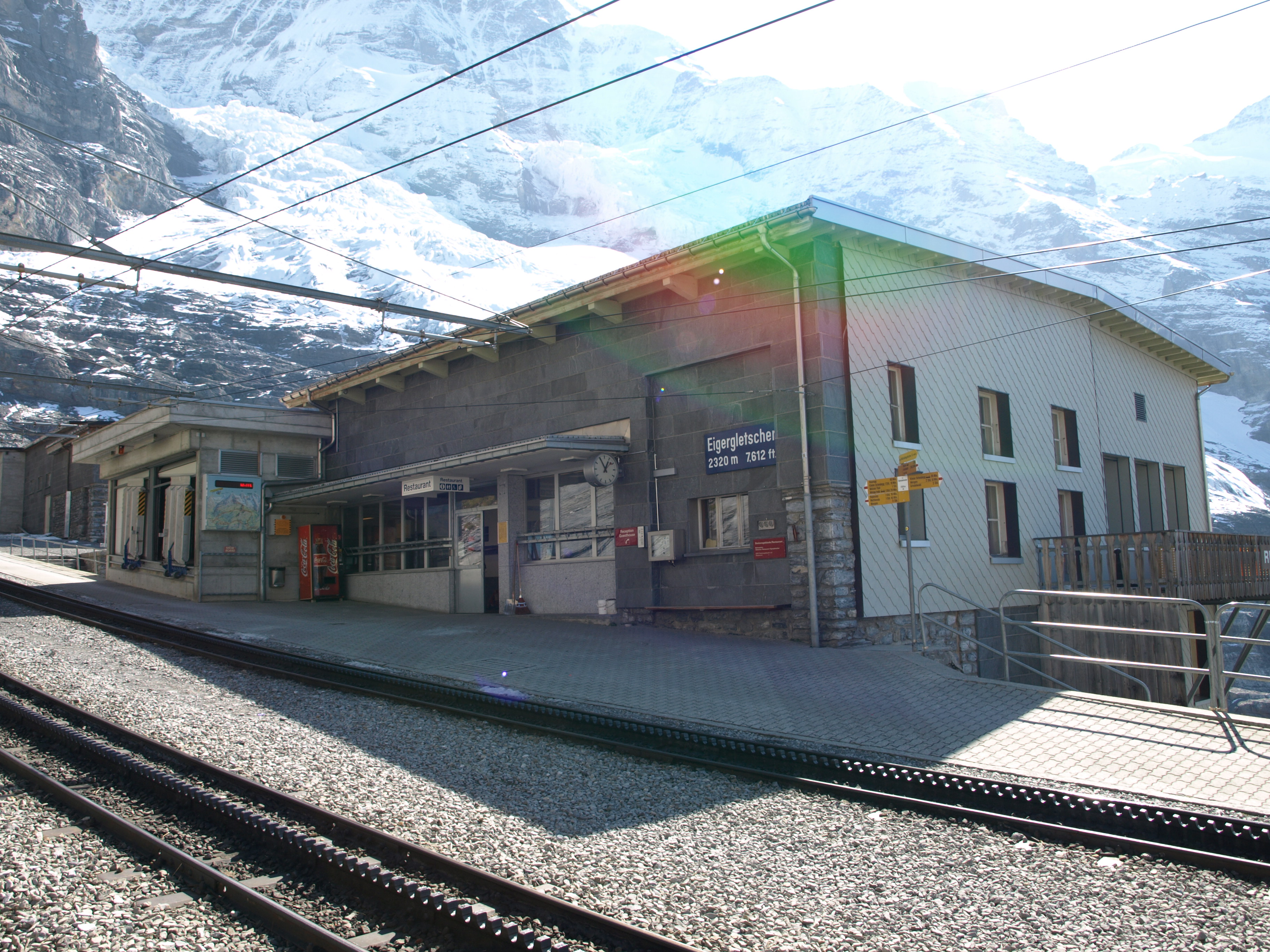

General information
- Location: Eigergletscher; Lauterbrunnen, Bern; Switzerland
- Coordinates: 46°34′29″N 07°58′13″E
- Elevation: 2,320 m (7,610 ft)
- Line: Jungfraubahn

History
- Opened: 1898; 128 years ago

Services
Preceding station	Jungfraubahn AG	Following station
Kleine Scheidegg Terminus	Jungfrau Railway	Eigerwand towards Jungfraujoch
Location
- Location within Switzerland

Eigergletscher is a railway station in the municipality of Lauterbrunnen in the canton of Bern. The station is served by trains of the Jungfrau railway, which run to the Jungfraujoch from Kleine Scheidegg, where they connect with services from Interlaken, Lauterbrunnen, Wengen and Grindelwald via the Bernese Oberland railway and the Wengernalp railway.

The station takes its name from the adjacent Eiger Glacier, and is the Jungfraubahn's last station in the open air, before the line enters its tunnel to the summit. It is also the location of the railway's workshop.

== History ==
The station opened on 19 September 1898, with the opening of the first open air stretch of the Jungfraubahn. After further construction, the line was extended to a temporary terminus within the tunnel at Rotstock station on 2 August 1899.

In 2012 Jungfraubahn AG announced that a new V-cableway would be constructed to bring visitors direct to Eigergletscher from Grindelwald, shortening journey times to the Jungfraujoch by 47 minutes. Construction started in the summer of 2018 and the new service called the Eiger Express began in December 2020. It allows a connection from a new station on the Bernese Oberland Railway, called Grindelwald Terminal, to the new Eigergletscher gondola station. This has a transfer hall where passengers can transfer to the Jungfraubahn train to the Jungfraujoch summit.

== Services ==
The following passenger trains operate:

Operator	Train Type	Route	Typical Frequency	Notes
Jungfraubahn		Kleine Scheidegg - Eigergletscher - Eigerwand - Eismeer - Jungfraujoch	2 per hour	

== Gallery ==
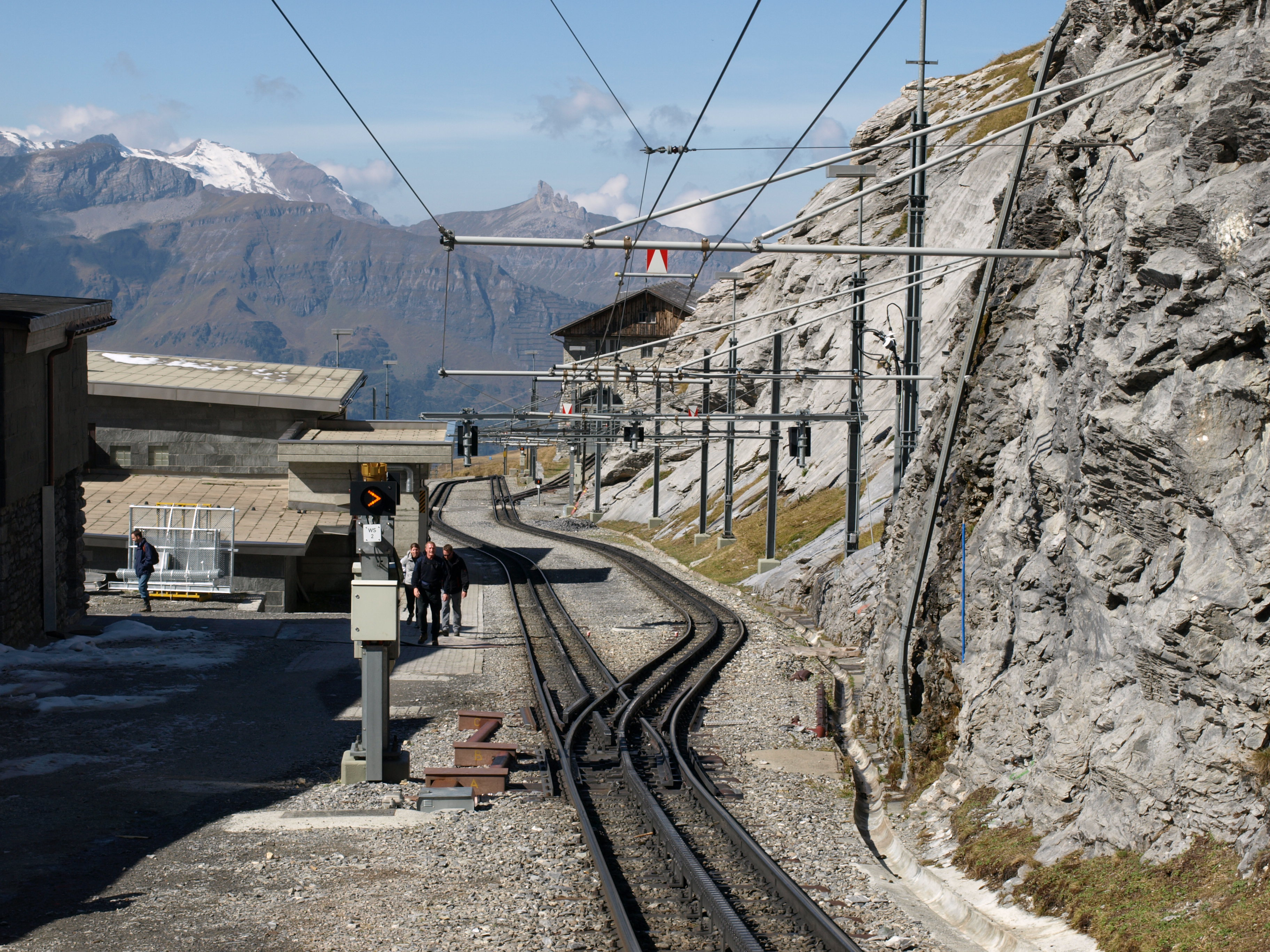
View of the station looking north

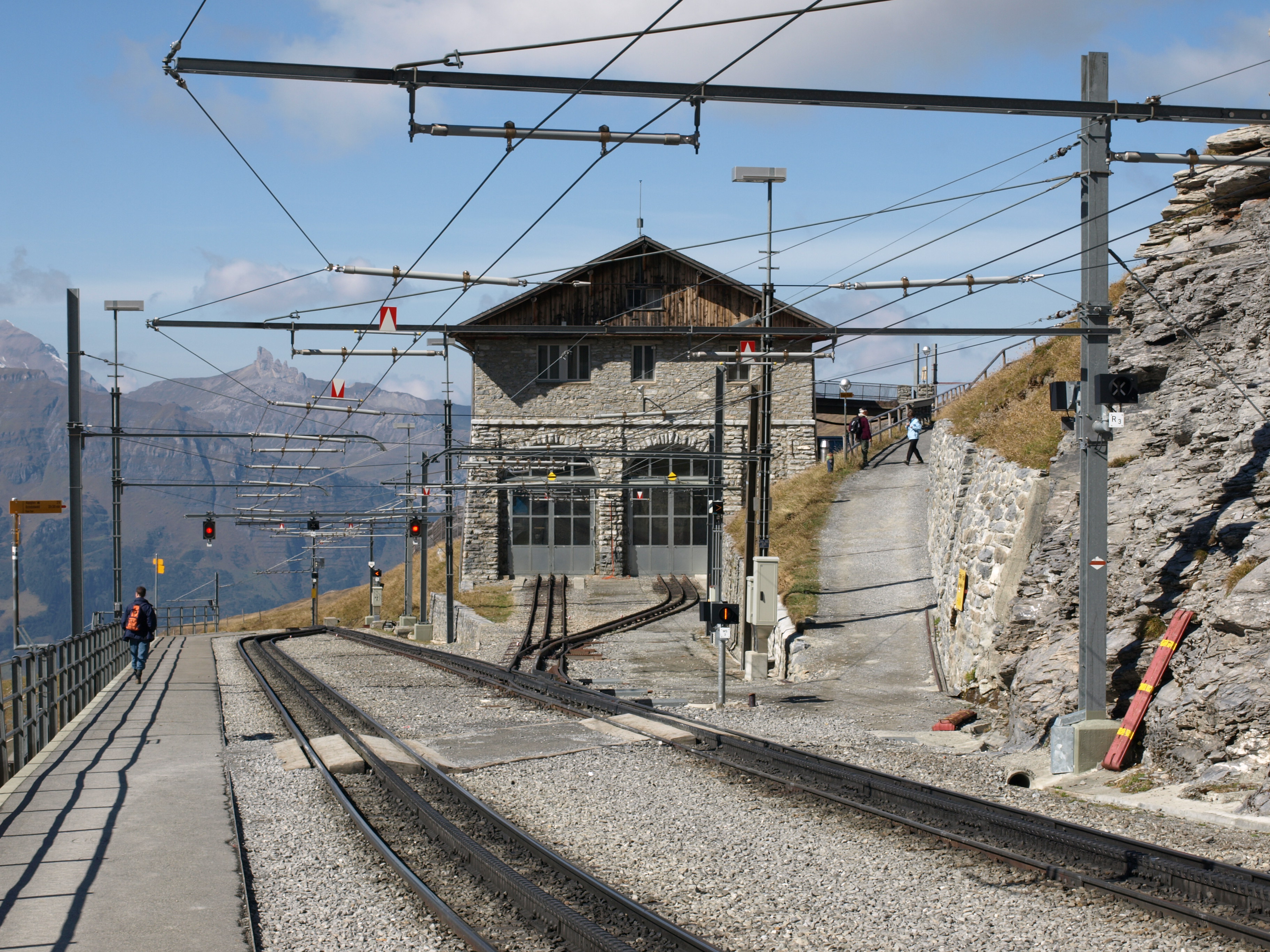
The workshop at the north end of the station

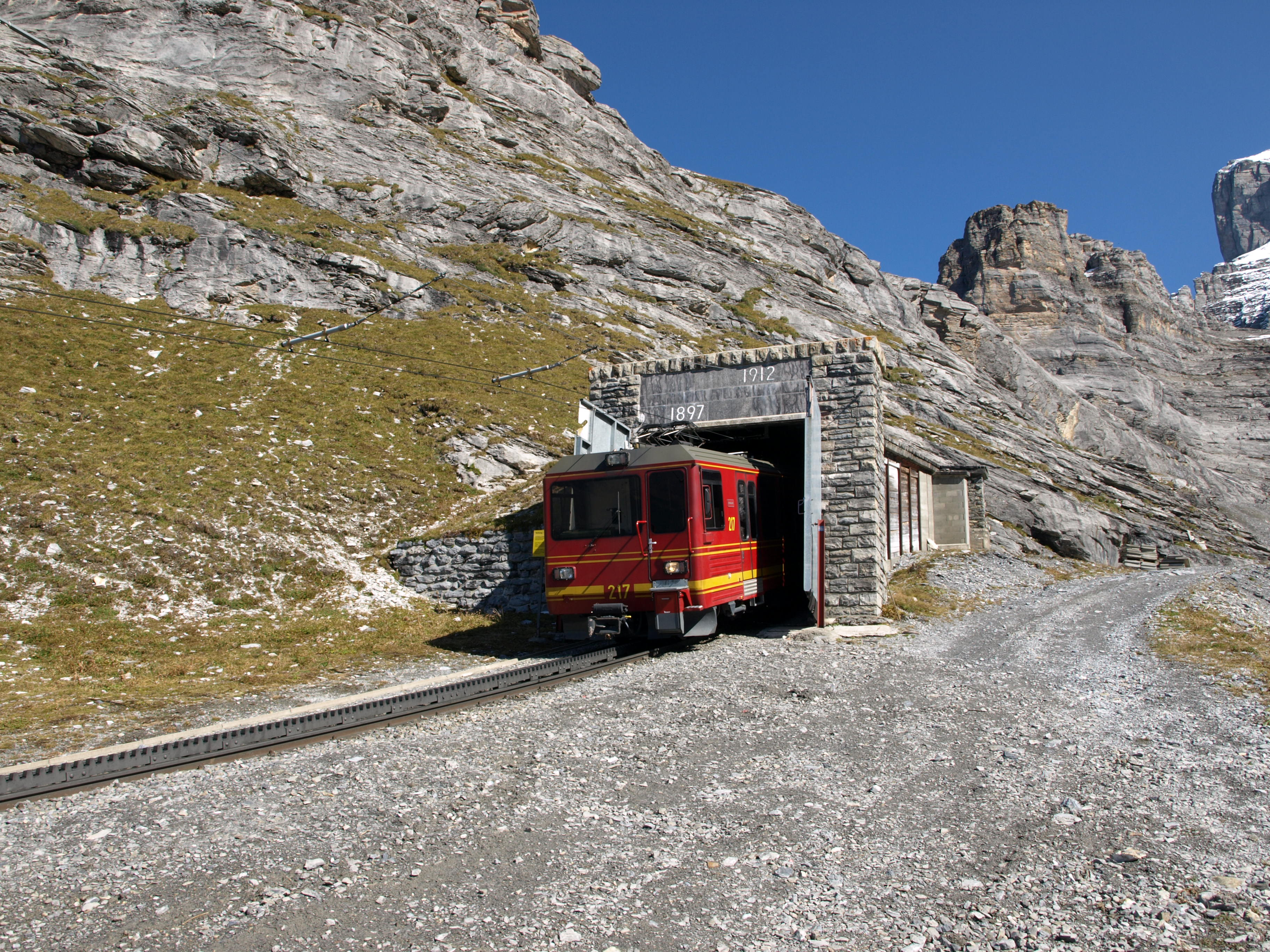
The tunnel mouth, just south of the station

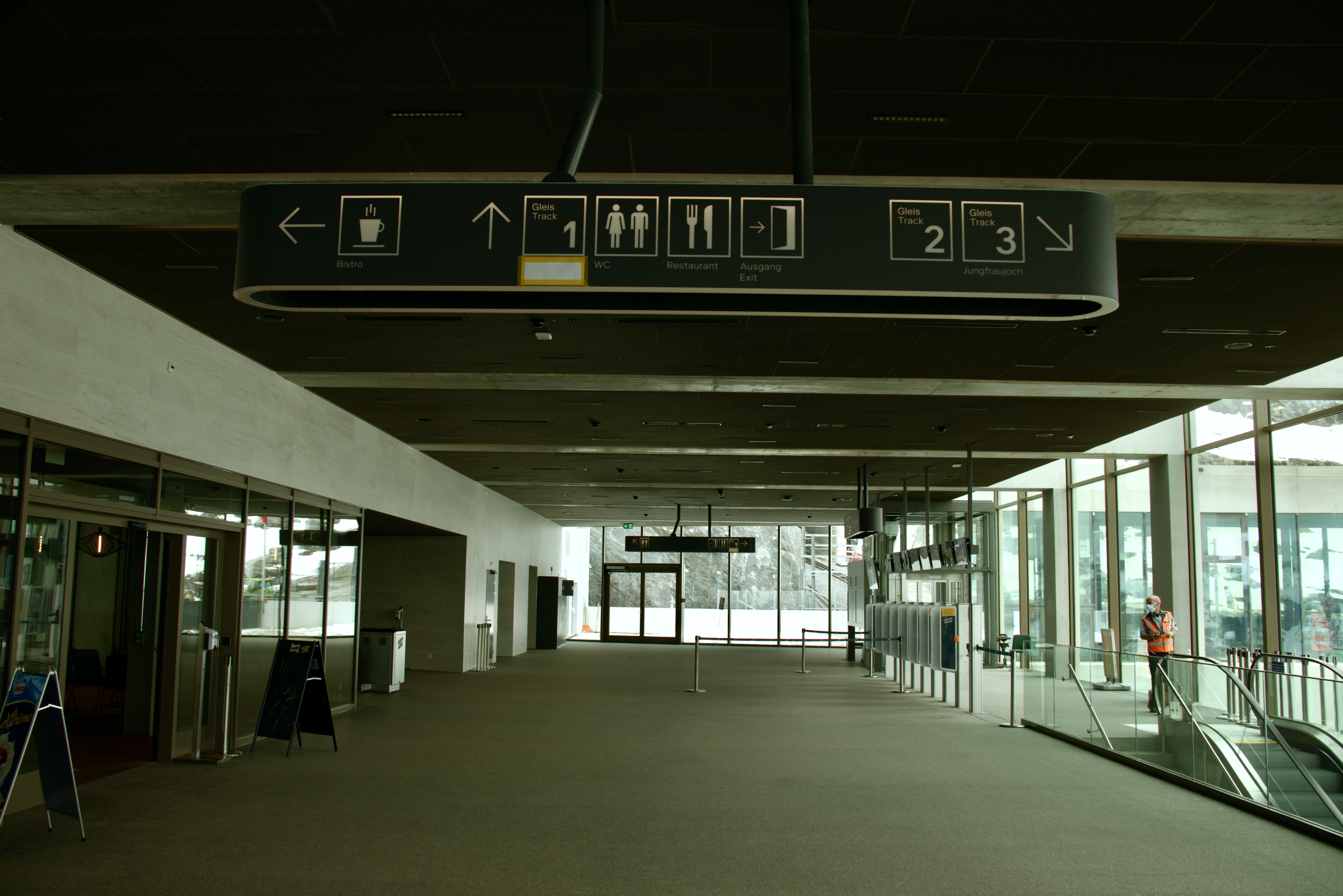
The new passenger hall connecting the Eiger Express gondola with the Jungfraujoch train

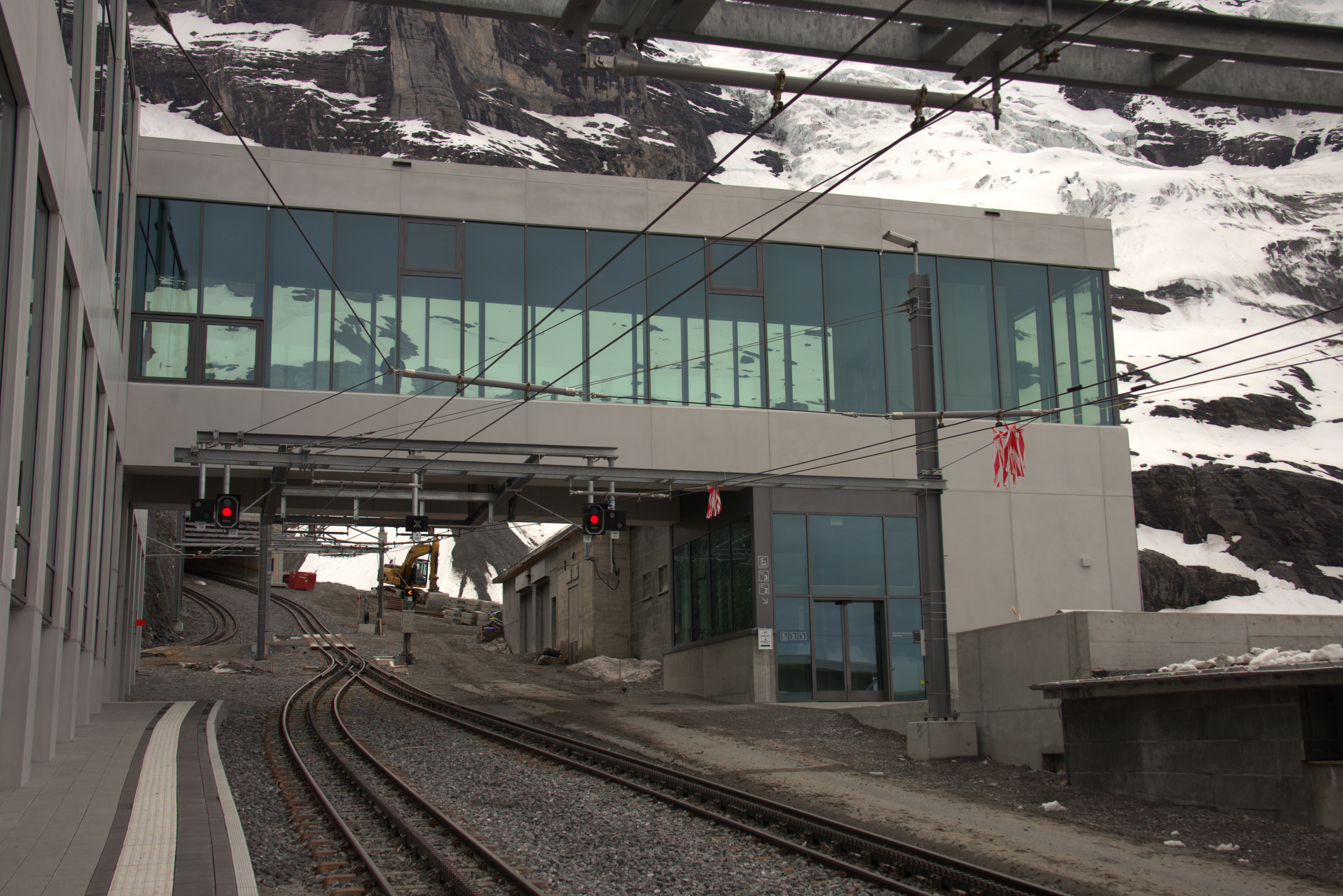
The station with new construction from the Eiger Express project, 2022

== See also ==
- List of highest railway stations in Switzerland
