= Wengen–Männlichen aerial cableway =

Cable car in Switzerland

Luftseilbahn Wengen-Männlichen
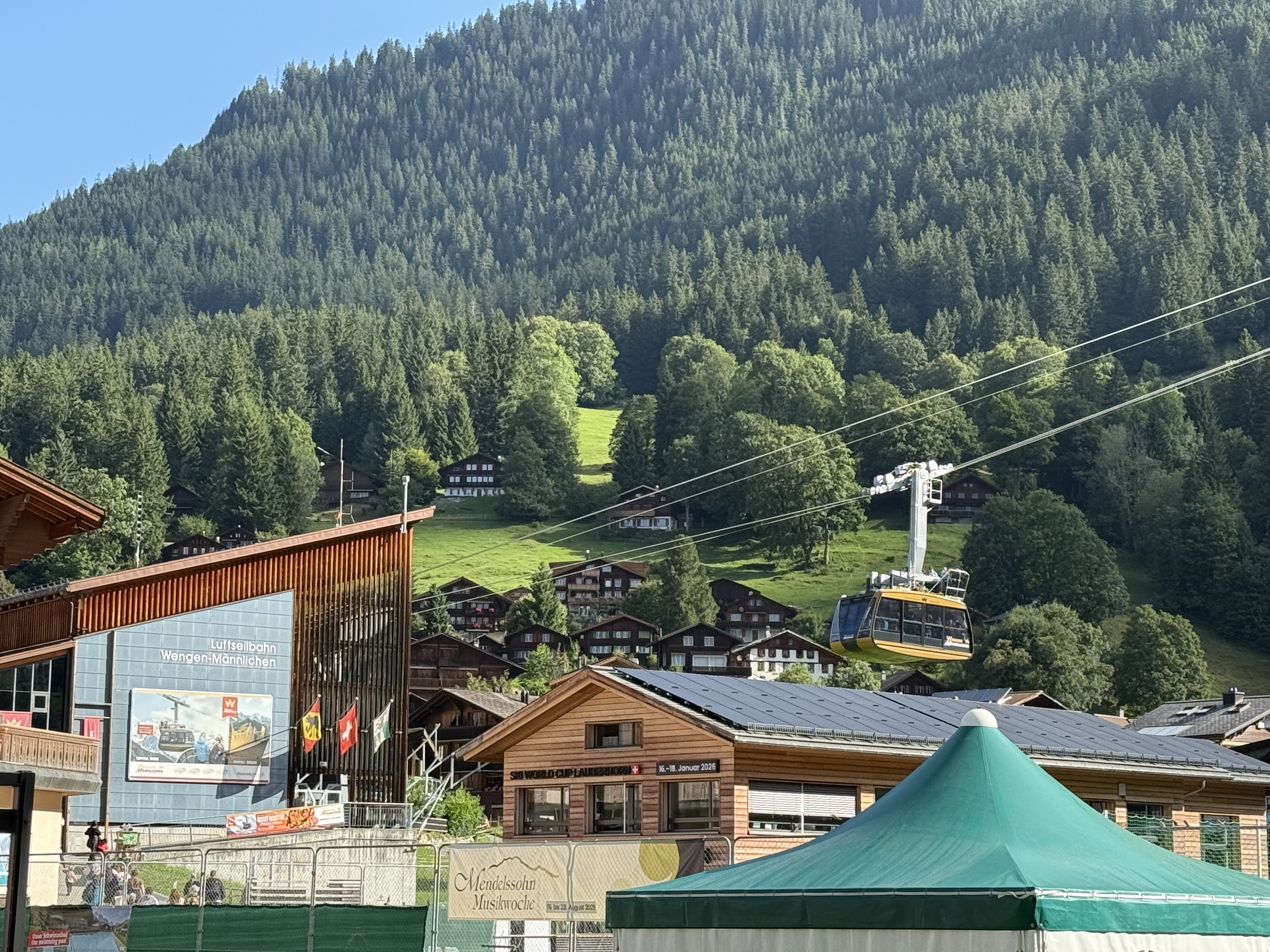
- The base station of the Luftseilbahn Wengen-Männlichen in Wengen
- Interactive map of Luftseilbahn Wengen-Männlichen

Overview
- Status: Operational
- Character: Leisure
- Location: Wengen, Switzerland
- Coordinates: 46.6131°N 7.9409°E
- Termini: Wengen; Männlichen
- Elevation: lowest: 1,247 metres (4,091 ft) highest: 2,229 metres (7,313 ft)
- No. of stations: 2
- Services: Männlichen
- Open: 22 July 1954
- Website: www.maennlichen.ch

Operation
- Owner: Luftseilbahn Wengen–Männlichen AG
- No. of carriers: 2
- Carrier capacity: 75 passengers per cabin
- Headway: 7.5–15 minutes
- Fare: Euro 54.18 return

Technical features
- Manufactured by: Garaventa AG
- Line length: 1,656.9 metres (5,436 ft)
- Operating speed: 10 metres per second (36 km/h)

The Wengen–Männlichen aerial cableway (German: Luftseilbahn Wengen-Männlichen) is a cable car linking Wengen with the Männlichen in Switzerland.

== History ==
In 1949, a number of concerned individuals from the resort of Wengen got together and founded a committee to provide a link between the resort and ski and hiking region of the Männlichen. Building began in 1953 and the cableway was opened on 22 July 1954. The estimated CHF 1.59 million building costs were overrun by about 4%.

As built, the cableway had two cabins each of which carried 40 people. These were replaced in 1963 by cabins for 50 people, at the same time as the valley station was extended. In 1973, the drive motor was replaced. In 1992 and 1993, the cableway, with the exception of the stations, was completely renovated at a cost of around CHF 8.7 million. Two new 80 person cabins were put into service, and journey time was reduced from 6–7 minutes to 4–5 minutes.

During the night of 22/23 February 1999, an avalanche buried the lower station under more than 10 m (33 ft) of debris. As a consequence, the cableway was shut for several months, and the canton of Bern decided that operation could not resume from the old location. Instead it was decided to rebuild the station outside the avalanche zone and close to the main street of Wengen. Operation resumed by the end of year.

For 2017 the service generated CHF 3,000,000 of income and a profit of CHF 86,000, with 218,315 passengers in the winter season, and 122,708 in the summer.

In 2018, the cars were replaced. The new cars included a detachable balcony offering an outside ride, named the Royal Ride, available to passengers for a CHF 5 supplement.

== Operations ==
The current cable car was built by Garaventa AG, and has a horizontal length of 1,656.9 m (5,436 ft). The height difference is 947.5 m (3,109 ft) with an average gradient of 70.8% and a maximum gradient of 96.9%. The cars operate at a speed of 10.0 m/s (33 ft/s), which gives a travel time of 5 minutes and a transport capacity of 860 persons per hour.

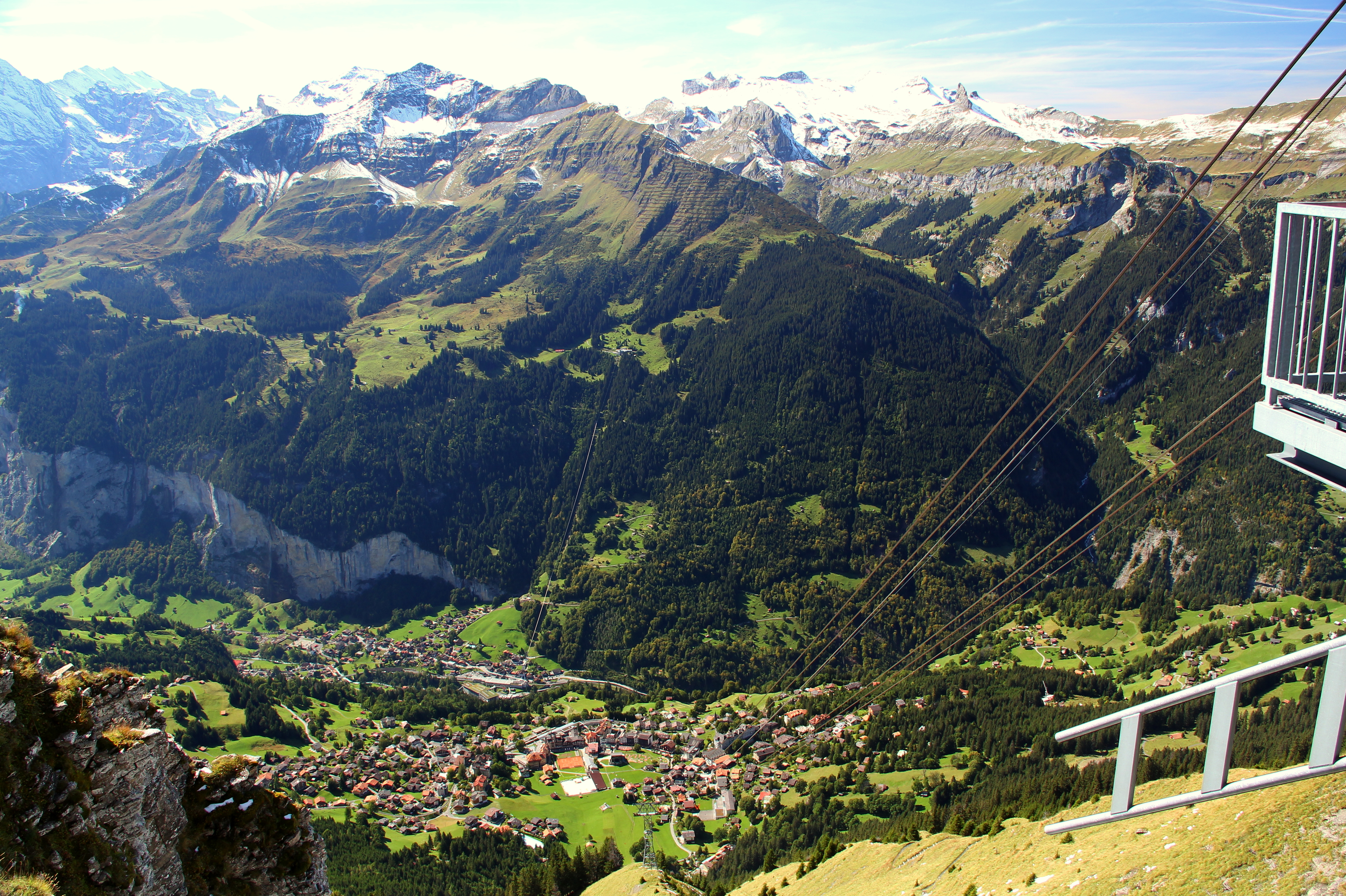
Wengen (foreground center, bottom) and Lauterbrunnen (left of center) seen from the upper Männlichen terminus of the cableway.

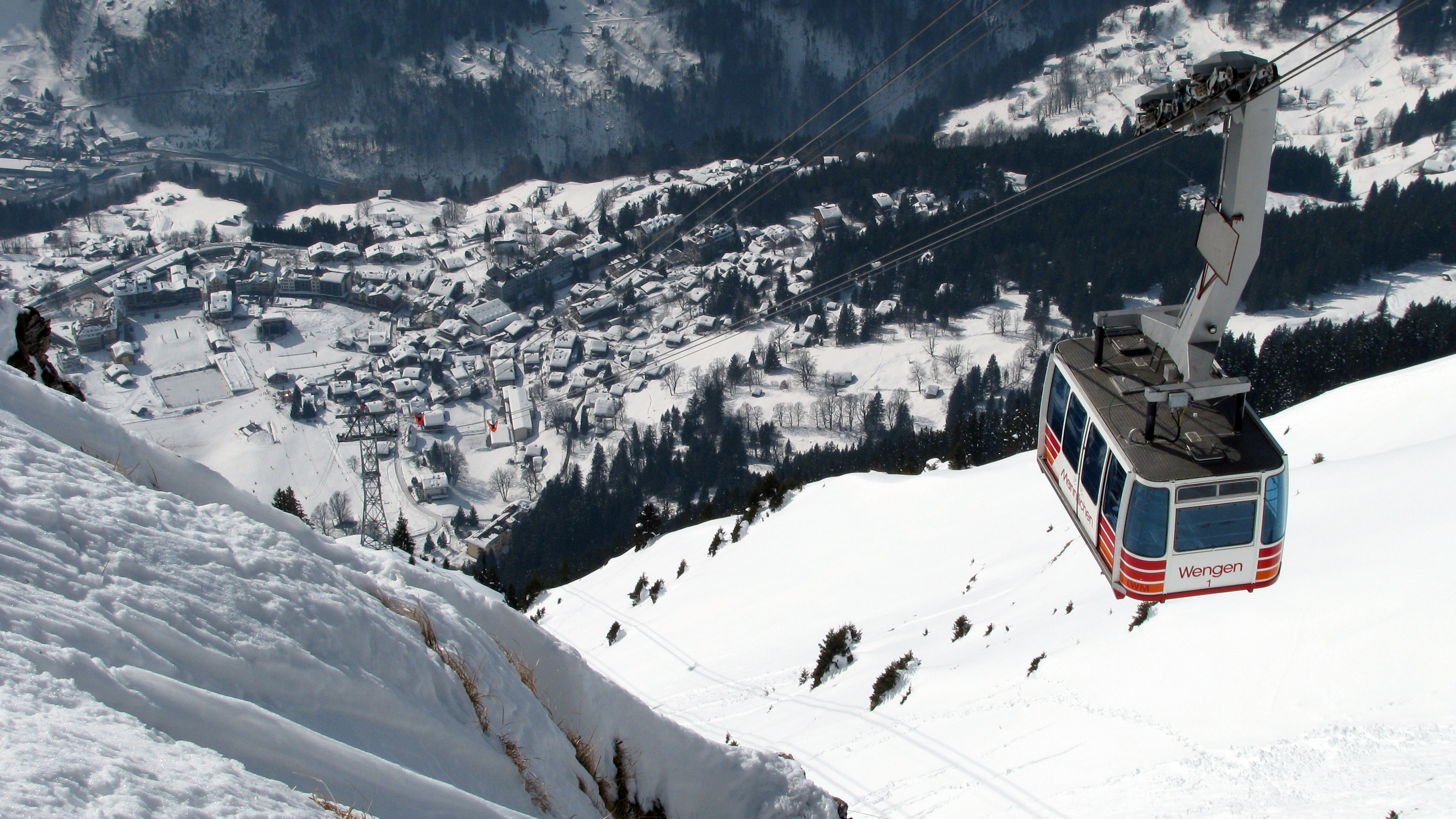
The cable car in winter

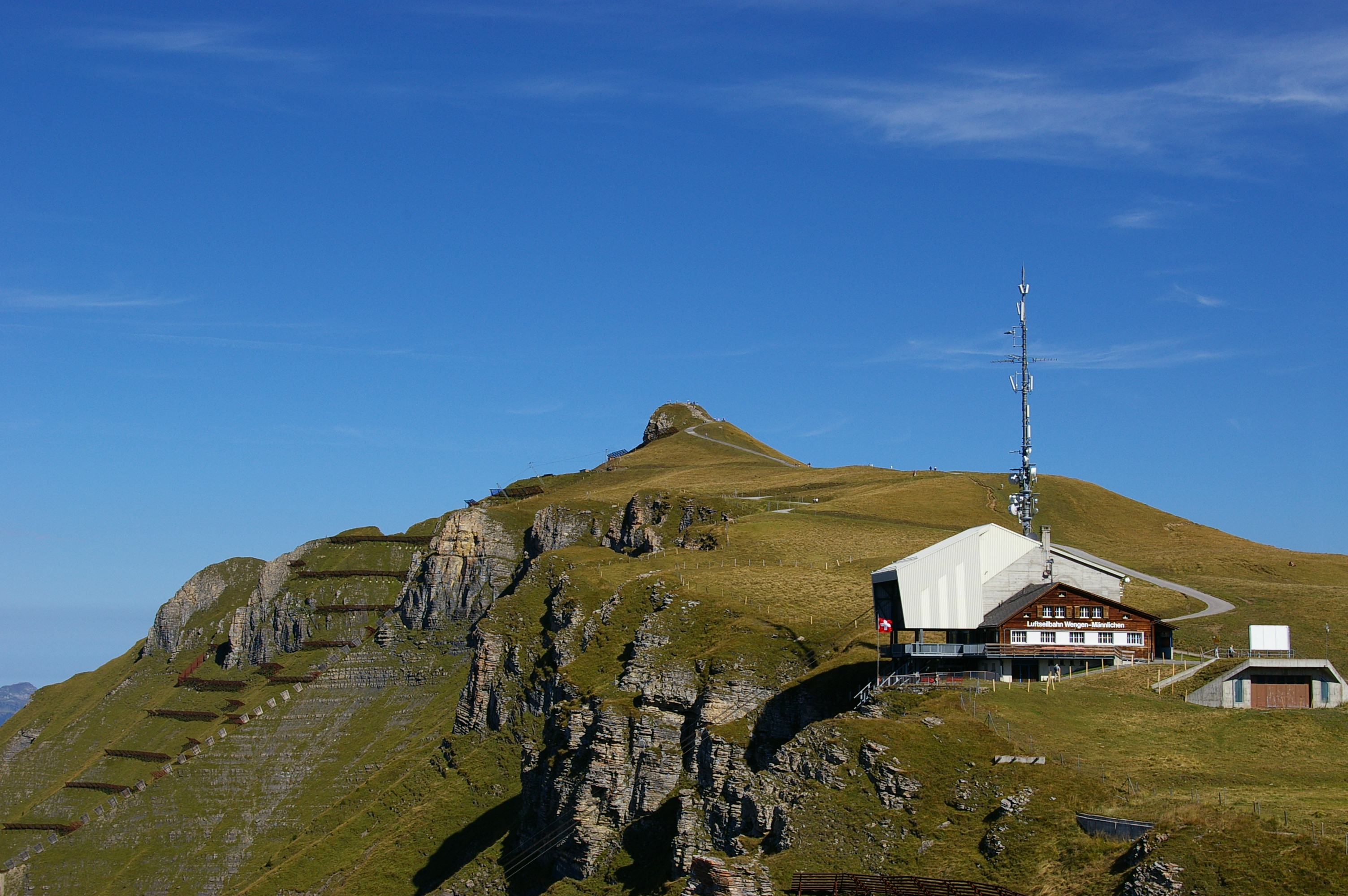
The upper station on the Männlichen

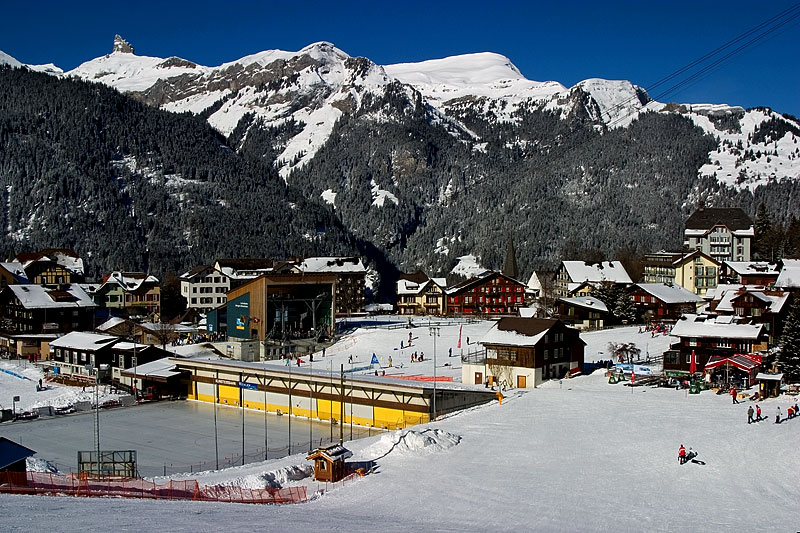
The lower station in Wengen

== Connections ==
The top station at Männlichen is close to the Grindelwald–Männlichen gondola cableway. The base station in Wengen is a short walk from the Wengernalp railway's Wengen station.

== See also ==
- List of aerial tramways in Switzerland
