= Eiger Glacier =

Glacier in the Bernese Alps, Switzerland

- Eigergletscher
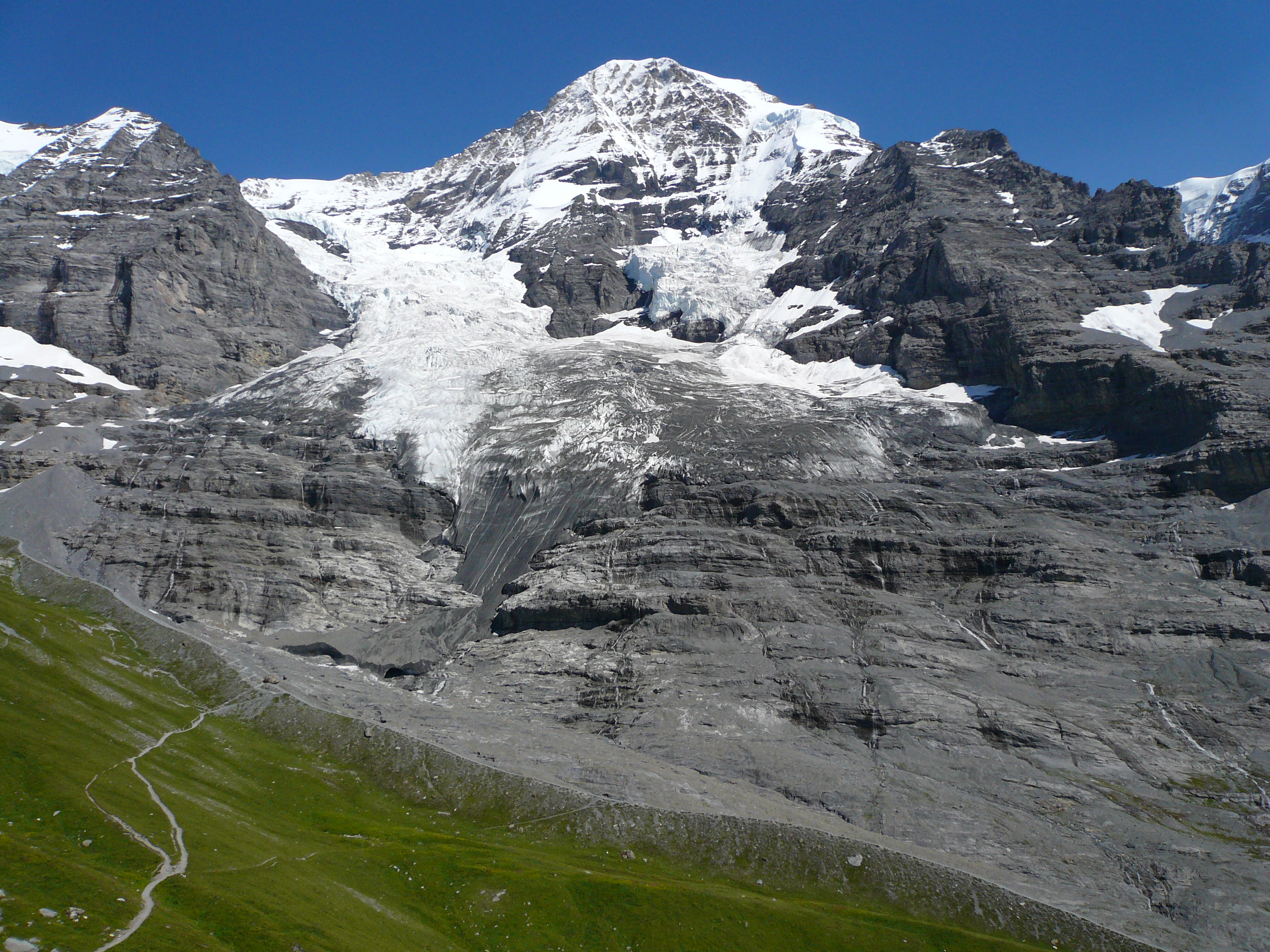
- The Eiger Glacier, passing between the Little Eiger and the Mönch

- Location within Switzerland Location within Alps
- Interactive map of Eiger Glacier
- Type: Alpine glacier, hanging glacier
- Location: Lauterbrunnen, Bern, Switzerland
- Coordinates: 46°34′02″N 7°59′20″E
- Area: 1.54 km^{2} (0.59 sq mi)
- Length: 2.59 km (1.61 mi)
- Highest elevation: 3,700 m (12,100 ft) above sea level
- Lowest elevation: 3,200 m (10,500 ft) above sea level
- Status: Retreating

The Eiger Glacier (German: Eigergletscher) is a glacier situated on the northwest side of the Eiger in the Bernese Alps of Switzerland, within the municipality of Lauterbrunnen in the canton of Bern. It extends from a height of 3,700 m (12,100 ft) above sea level behind the Little Eiger, a secondary peak to the west of the Eiger, and runs toward the valley in the direction of the Eigergletscher railway station. Another tongue, at 3,200 to 3,500 m (10,500 to 11,500 ft) above sea level, is in the form of a hanging glacier between the Eiger and Little Eiger.

The glacier is 2.59 km (1.61 mi) long, with an area of 1.54 km^{2} (0.59 sq mi), reduced from an area of 2.13 km^{2} (0.82 sq mi) recorded in 1973. From 1993 to 2017, it retreated by around 500 m (1,600 ft) as the glacier melted.

== History ==
In 1990, a large, continuous crack was discovered during a helicopter flight, leading the Research Institute for Hydraulic Engineering, Hydrology and Glaciology at ETH Zurich to begin research to better understand hanging glaciers and develop measures to protect the Jungfrau railway station. The threatened collapse occurred later that year, but without causing any damage. Since then, an automatic camera has taken a photo of the glacier every day.

In 2017, researchers from the University of Bern used detectors in the Jungfrau railway tunnel to produce 3D imaging of the Eiger Glacier’s firn layer, reaching depths of up to 80 metres. A study published in Geophysical Research Letters found that the glacier’s movement parallel to steep rock faces had caused lateral erosion. The researchers noted that continued monitoring is important, as receding ice may increase rockfall risk in an area with tourist facilities and a research station.

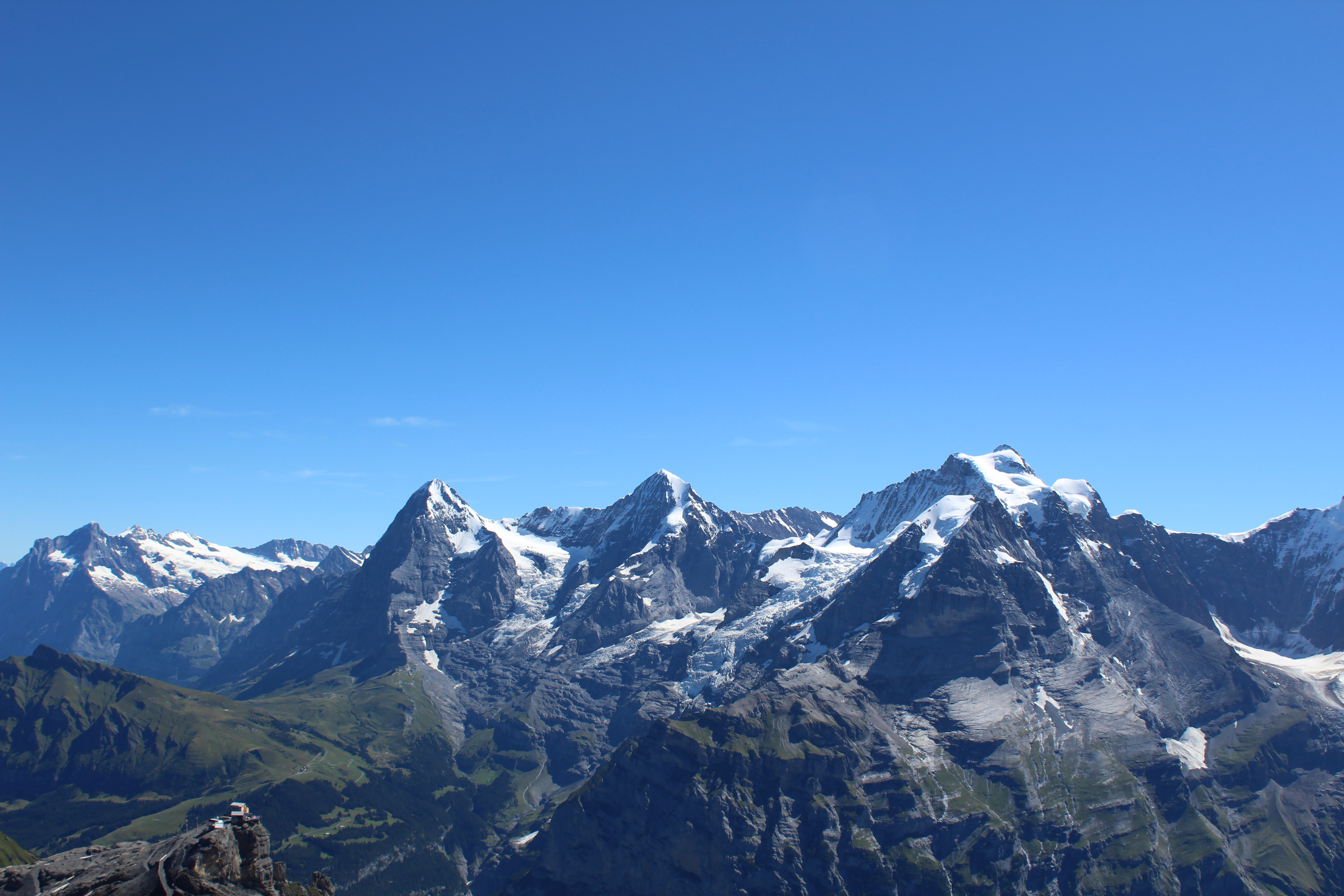
Panorama seen from the Schilthorn. Glaciers, from left to right: Gutz Glacier, Chrinnengletscher, Upper Grindelwald Glacier, Eigergletscher, Nollen Glacier, Guggi Glacier, Giessen Glacier, Silberhorn Glacier, Hochfirn (Jungfrau), Rottal-Hochfirn, and Rottal Glacier

== See also ==
- List of glaciers in Switzerland
- Swiss Alps
