= Hanging glacier =

Type of glacier

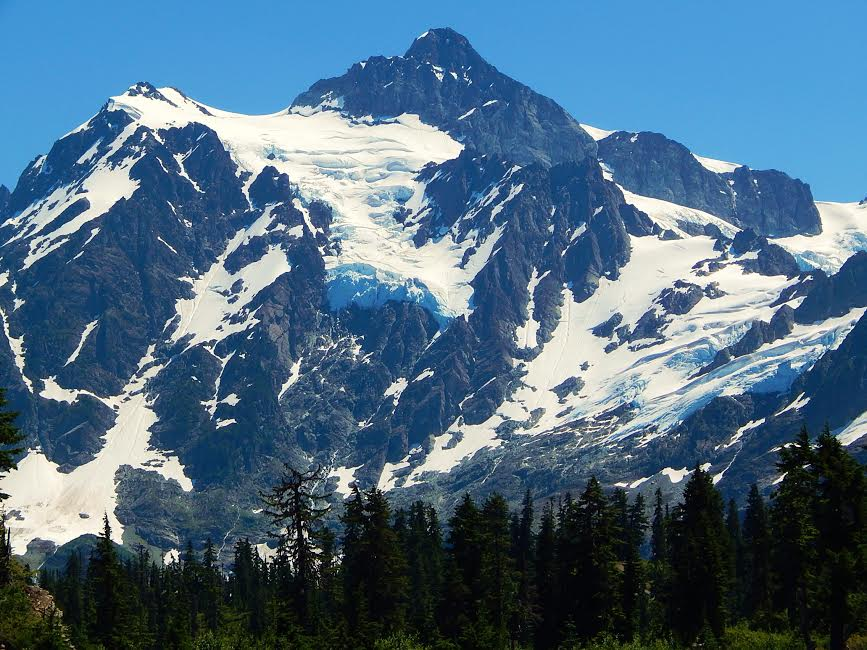
A hanging glacier on Mount Shuksan.

A hanging glacier originates high on the wall of a glacial valley and descends only part of the way to the surface of the main glacier and abruptly stops, typically at a cliff. Avalanching and icefalls are the mechanisms for ice and snow transfer to the valley floor below.

Hanging glaciers are inherently unstable, and may produce catastrophic break-off events. These glaciers are often partially frozen to their bedrock, allowing them to locate on steep slopes. Break-off events leading to substantial ice avalanches pose severe hazards to humans, settlements, and infrastructure in alpine terrain worldwide. Rock and icefall from a hanging glacier was responsible for triggering the Kolka-Karmadon rock ice slide in 2002, which killed 125 people.

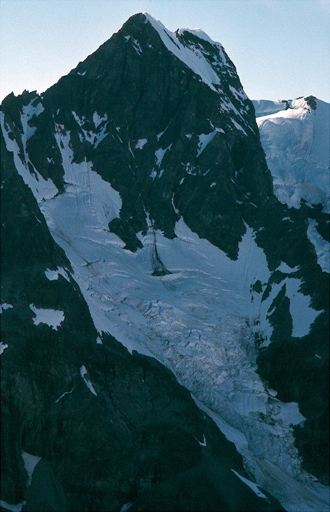
North-looking oblique aerial photograph showing a small, unnamed hanging glacier located in the Chugach Mountains, near Cordova Peak, Chugach National Forest, Alaska.

== Formation ==
Hanging glaciers occur when a major valley glacier system retreats and thins, leaving the tributary glaciers in smaller valleys high above the shrunken central glacier surface. If the entire system has melted and disappeared, the empty high valleys are called hanging valleys.
