= Männlichen =

Mountain in the Swiss Alps

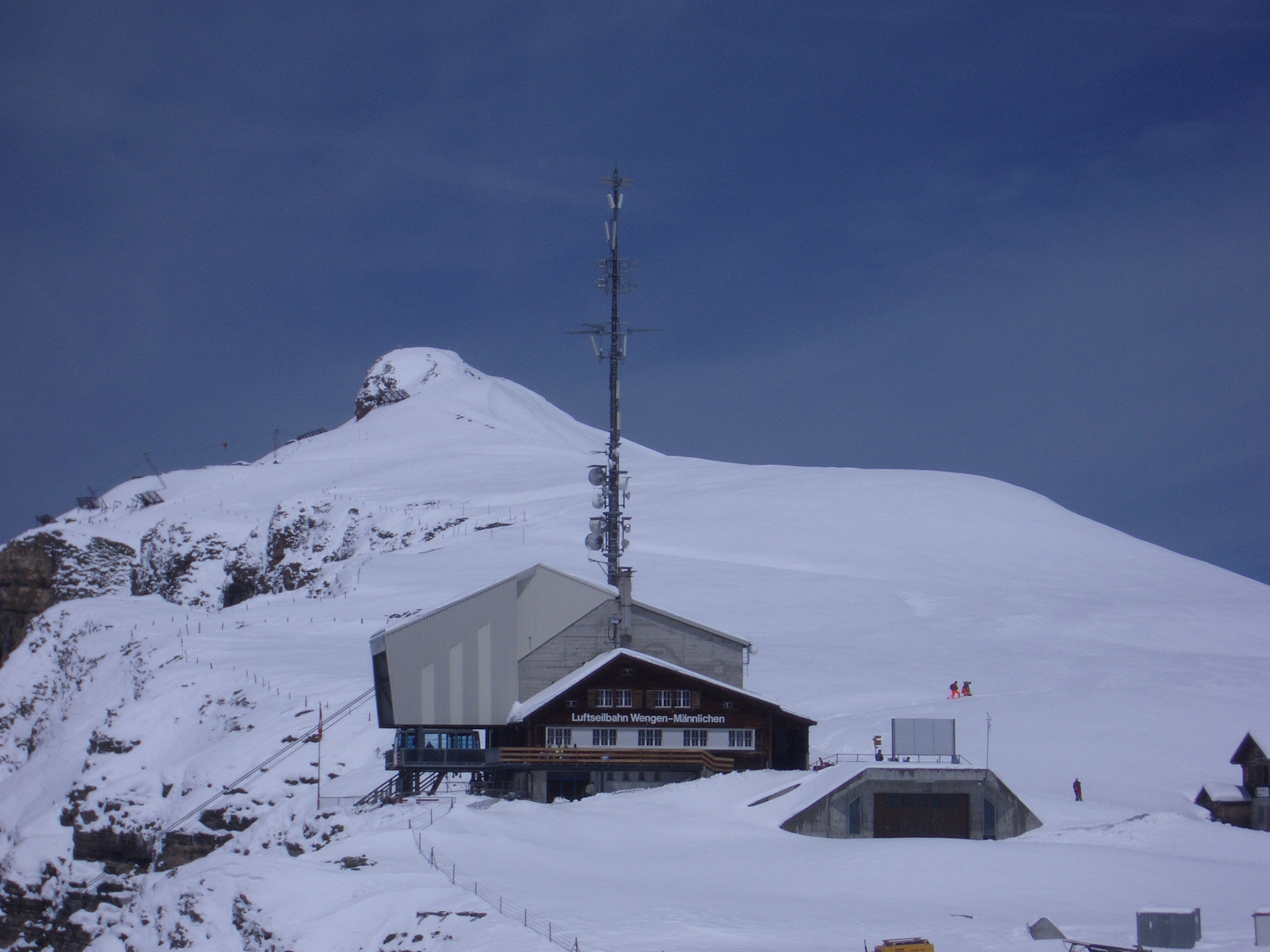
- The top station of the Luftseilbahn Wengen-Männlichen with the Männlichen summit behind

Highest point
- Elevation: 2,343 m (7,687 ft)
- Prominence: 141 m (463 ft)
- Parent peak: Tschuggen
- Coordinates: 46°37′05″N 7°56′17″E

Geography
- Location within Switzerland
- Location: Bernese Oberland, Switzerland
- Parent range: Bernese Alps

Climbing
- Easiest route: Aerial tramway

The Männlichen (German: [ˈmɛnlɪçn̩]) is a 2,343-metre (7,687 ft) mountain in the Swiss Alps located within the Canton of Bern.

It can be reached from Wengen by the Wengen–Männlichen aerial cableway, or from the new (December 2019) Grindelwald Terminal station using the Grindelwald–Männlichen gondola cableway (GM). It then takes 15 minutes to walk to the summit. It is a popular viewpoint over the Lauterbrunnen valley and a popular start location for hikers and skiers.

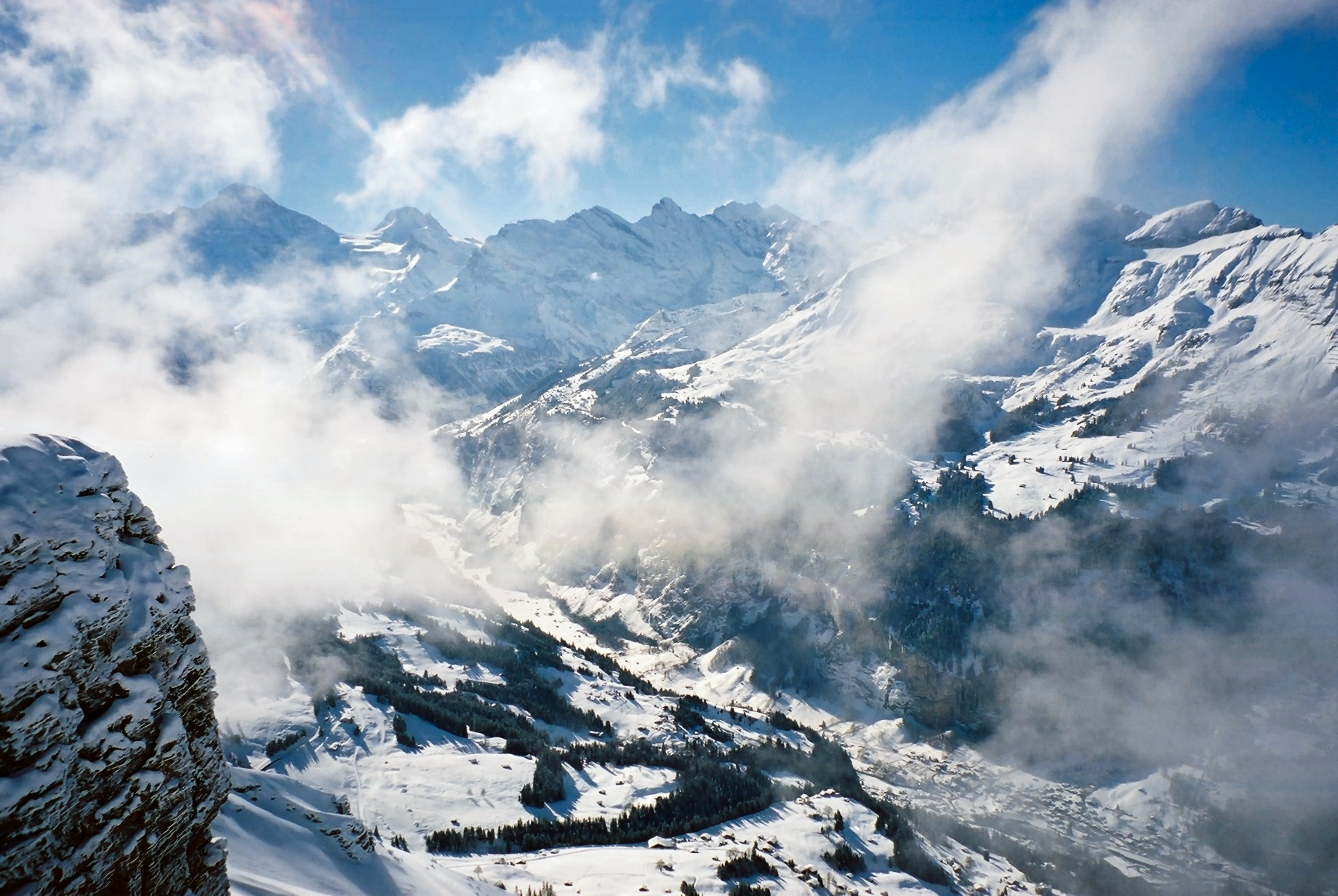
Lauterbrunnen Valley in winter from Männlichen

== See also ==
- List of mountains of Switzerland accessible by public transport
