= Grindelwald–Männlichen gondola cableway =

Coordinates: 46.6247°N 8.0189°E

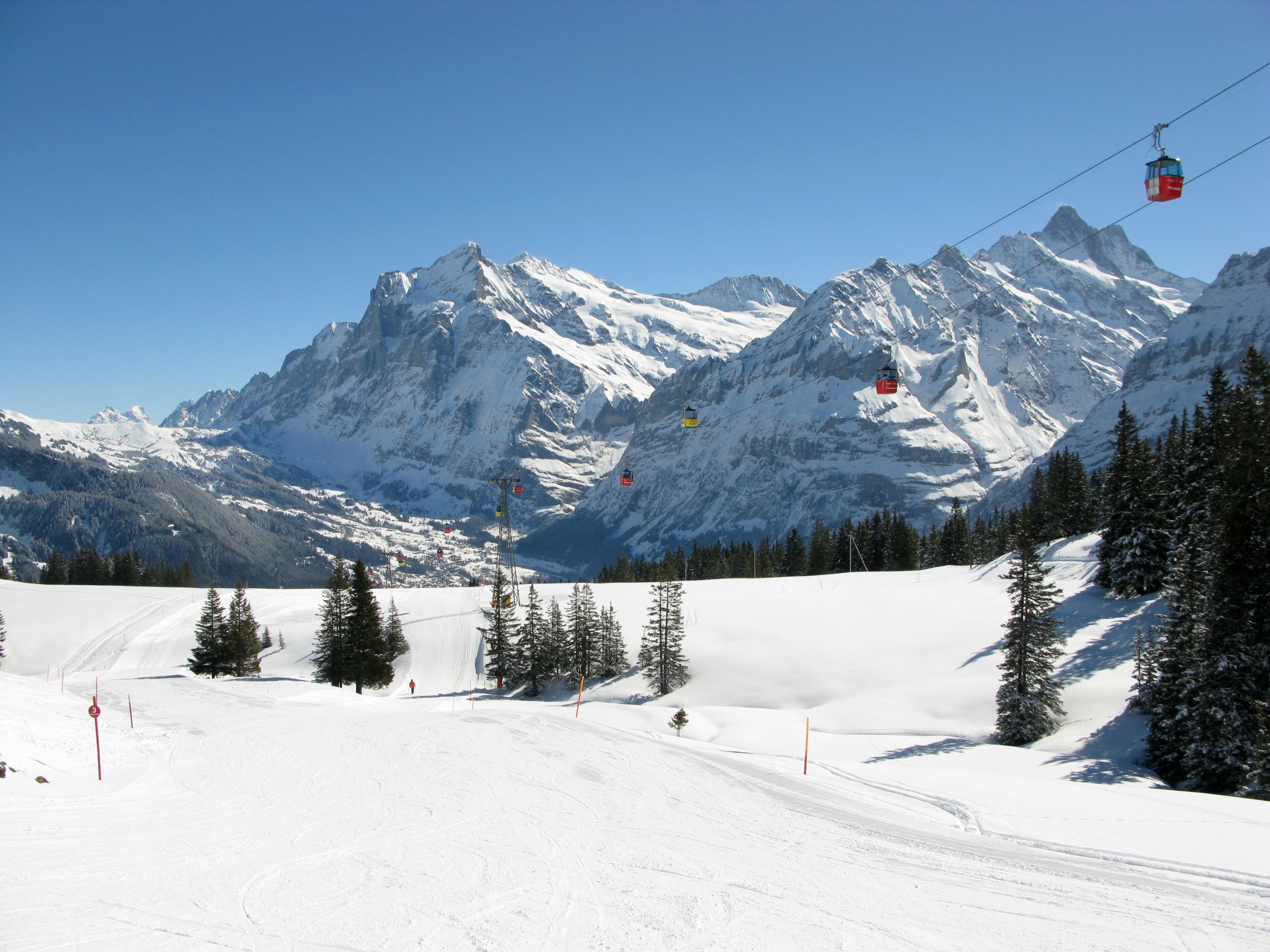
View to the valley, in the background Wetterhorn and Schreckhorn

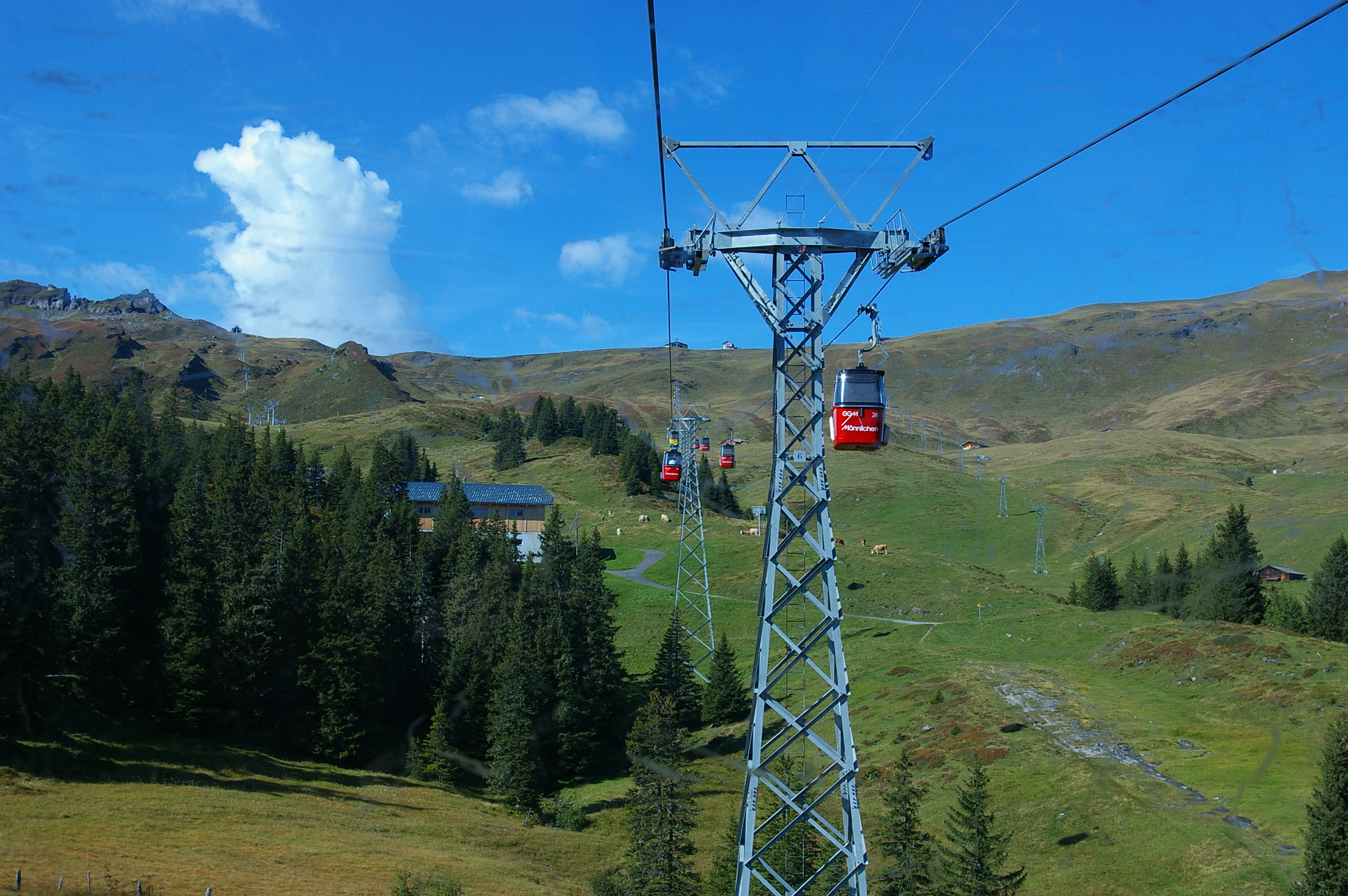
View towards the summit

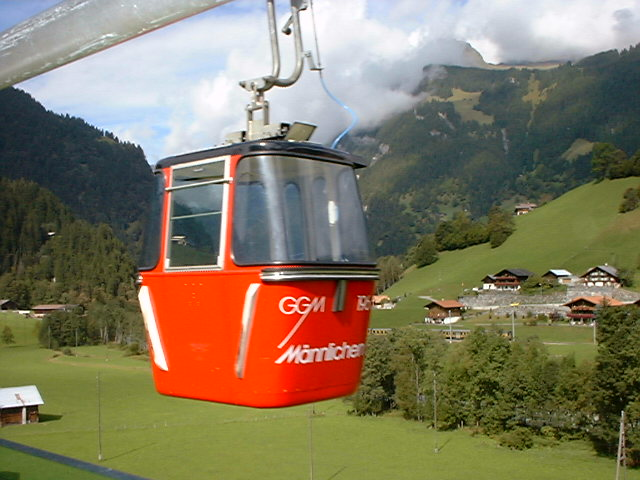
Near Grindelwald Grund in summer

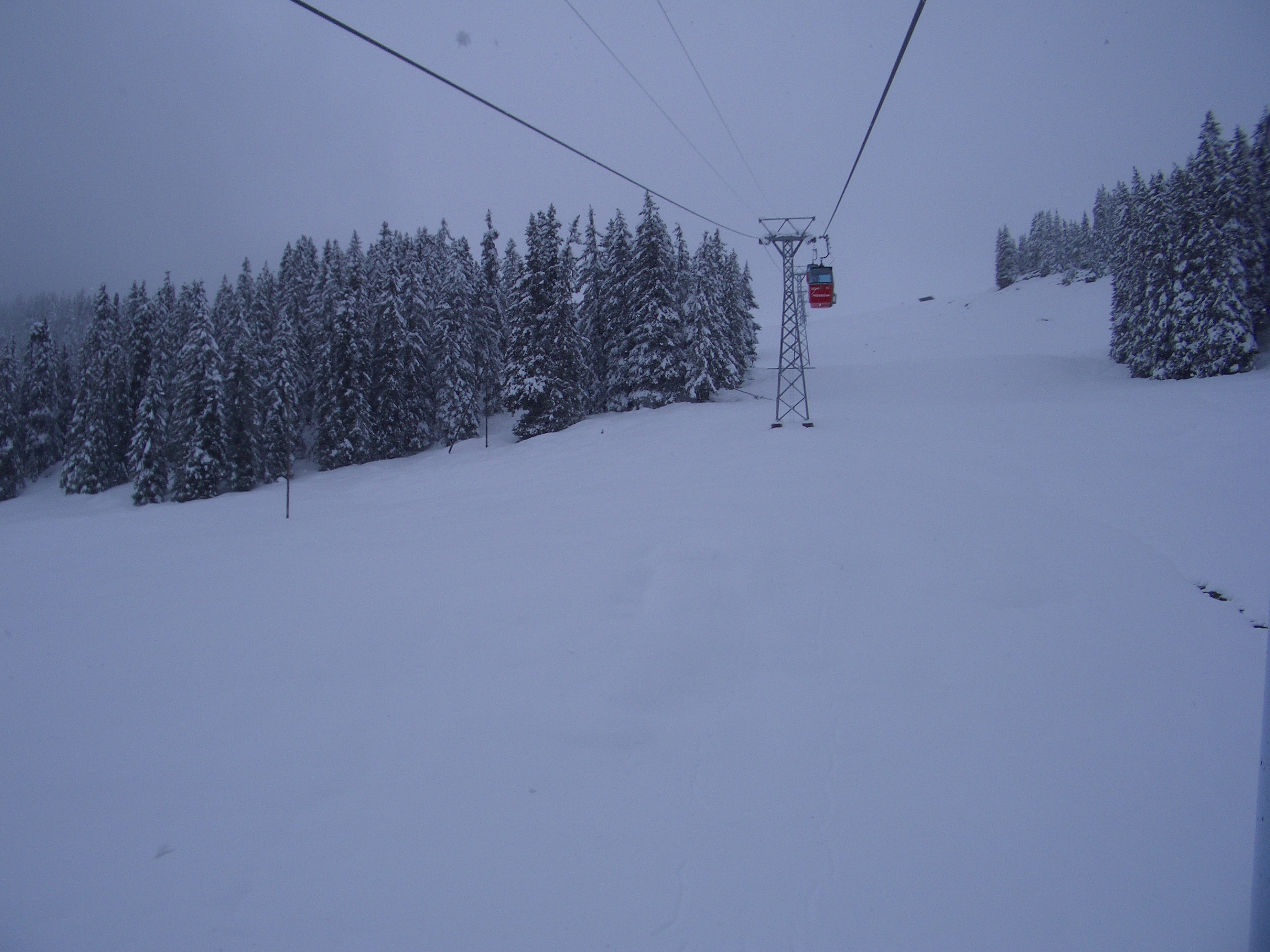
A view from the gondola in winter

The Grindelwald–Männlichen gondola cableway (German: Gondelbahn Grindelwald-Männlichen, GGM) is a gondola cableway linking Grindelwald with Männlichen. It is owned and operated by the Gondelbahn Grindelwald–Männlichen AG.

At a length of 6.239 km, the Grindelwald–Männlichen gondola cableway was the longest passenger-carrying gondola cableway in the world when it opened in 1978.

== History ==
The cableway was proposed in order to provide direct access to the snow-sure and wind-sheltered Männlichen ski region and thus extend the ski season into spring. It was also felt that it would create interesting new round-trips and hiking attractions.

The company was founded in 1978, and the cableway opened in 1978 (48 years ago). The cableway was constructed by Habegger Maschinenfabrik AG, at a cost of CHF 22 million. At the time of its construction it was the world's longest aerial gondola cableway.

The gondola was upgraded in 2019 as part of the V-cableway, with a new 10-passenger gondola built and designed by Doppelmayr and paid for by Jungfraubahn AG. This replaced the original 1978 infrastructure.

== Operations ==
The cableway is constructed in two sections, and there is an intermediate station at Holenstein where the gondolas change cable. Each gondola carries up to ten passengers (four in the original gondola prior to 2020), and the cableway can transport 1,800 passengers (previously 900) per hour. The journey time from Grindelwald to Männlichen is 19 minutes (previously 30 minutes).

== Connections ==
It is a 3-minute walk from the Gondelbahn base station at Grindelwald to the Wengernalp railway's Grindelwald Grund station. It is a 4-minute walk from the Gondelbahn top station at Männlichen to the Wengen–Männlichen aerial cableway.
