= Allmend railway station =

Railway station in canton of Bern, Switzerland

Allmend
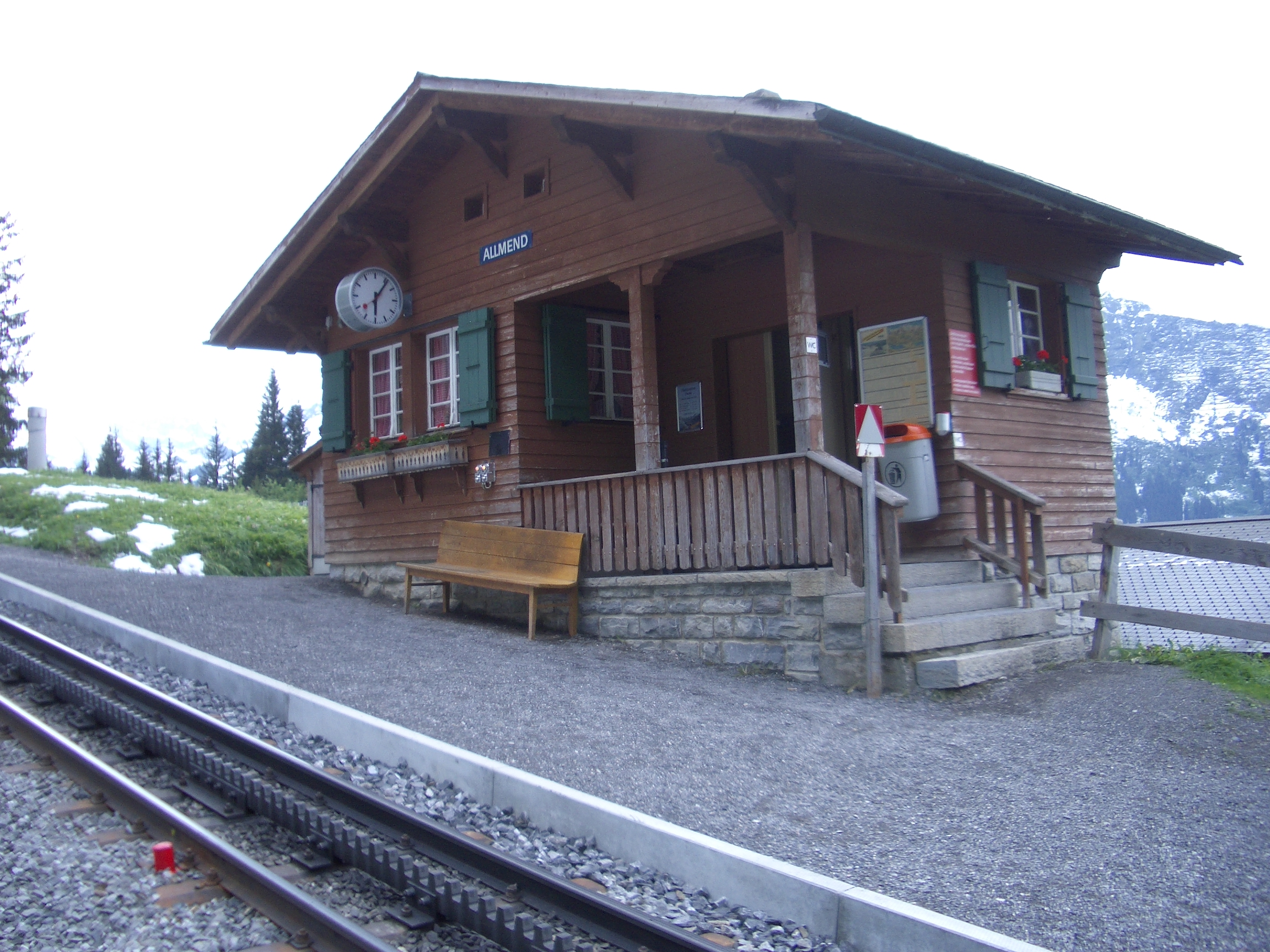
- station building (2007)

General information
- Location: Allmend; Lauterbrunnen, Bern; Switzerland
- Coordinates: 46°35′38″N 7°55′54″E
- Elevation: 1,509 m (4,951 ft)
- Line: Wengernalpbahn

Services
Preceding station	Jungfraubahn AG	Following station
Wengen towards Lauterbrunnen	Wengernalp Railway	Wengernalp towards Kleine Scheidegg
Location
- Location within Switzerland

Allmend is a request stop railway station in the municipality of Lauterbrunnen in the Swiss canton of Bern. The station is on the Wengernalpbahn (WAB), whose trains operate from Lauterbrunnen to Kleine Scheidegg via Wengen.

Downhill of the station, the line enters an avalanche gallery.

The station is served by the following passenger trains:

Operator	Train Type	Route	Typical Frequency	Notes
Wengernalpbahn		Lauterbrunnen - Wengwald - Wengen - Allmend - Wengernalp - Kleine Scheidegg	2 per hour	

== Gallery ==
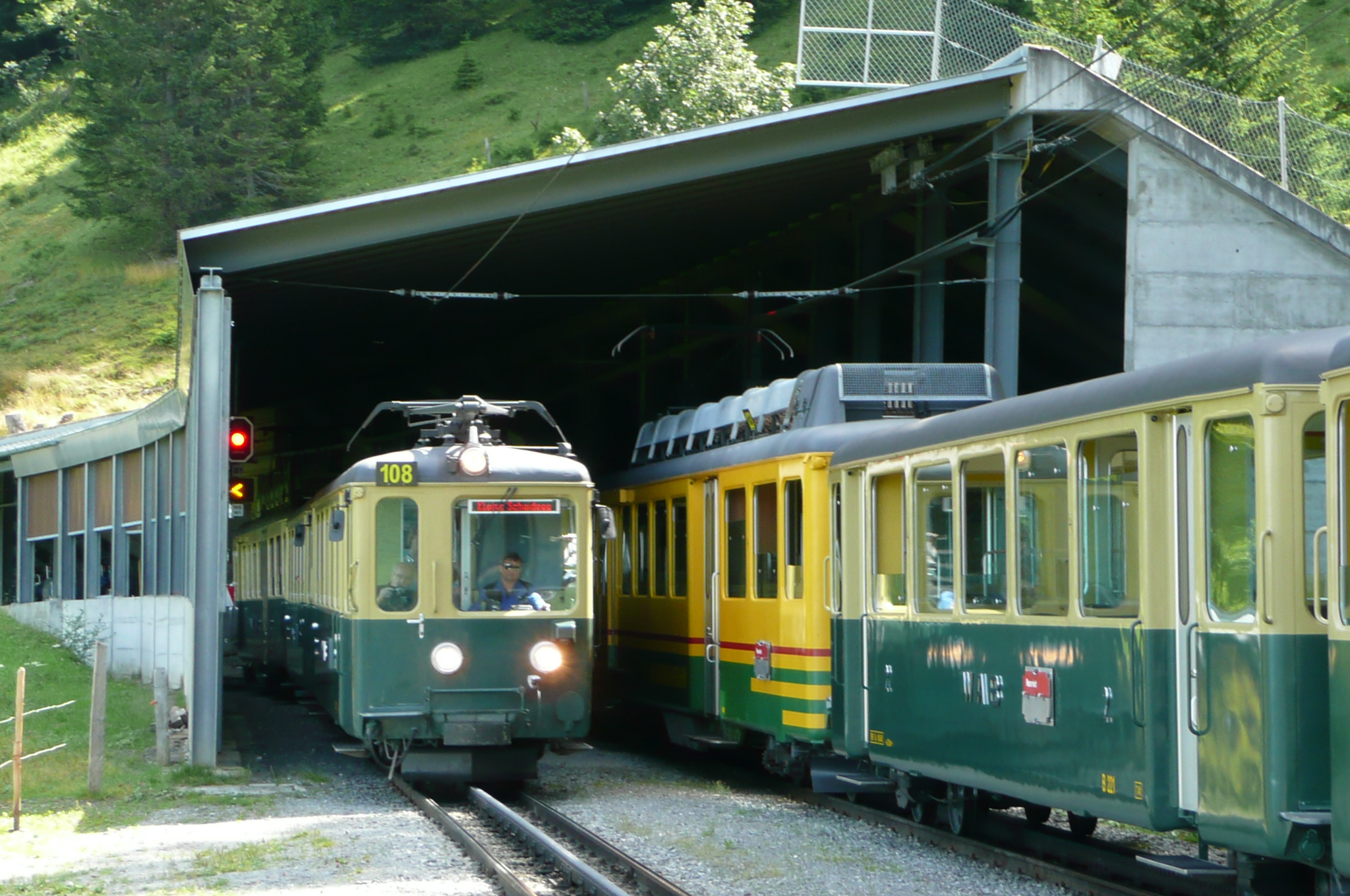
avalanche gallery below the station (2009)

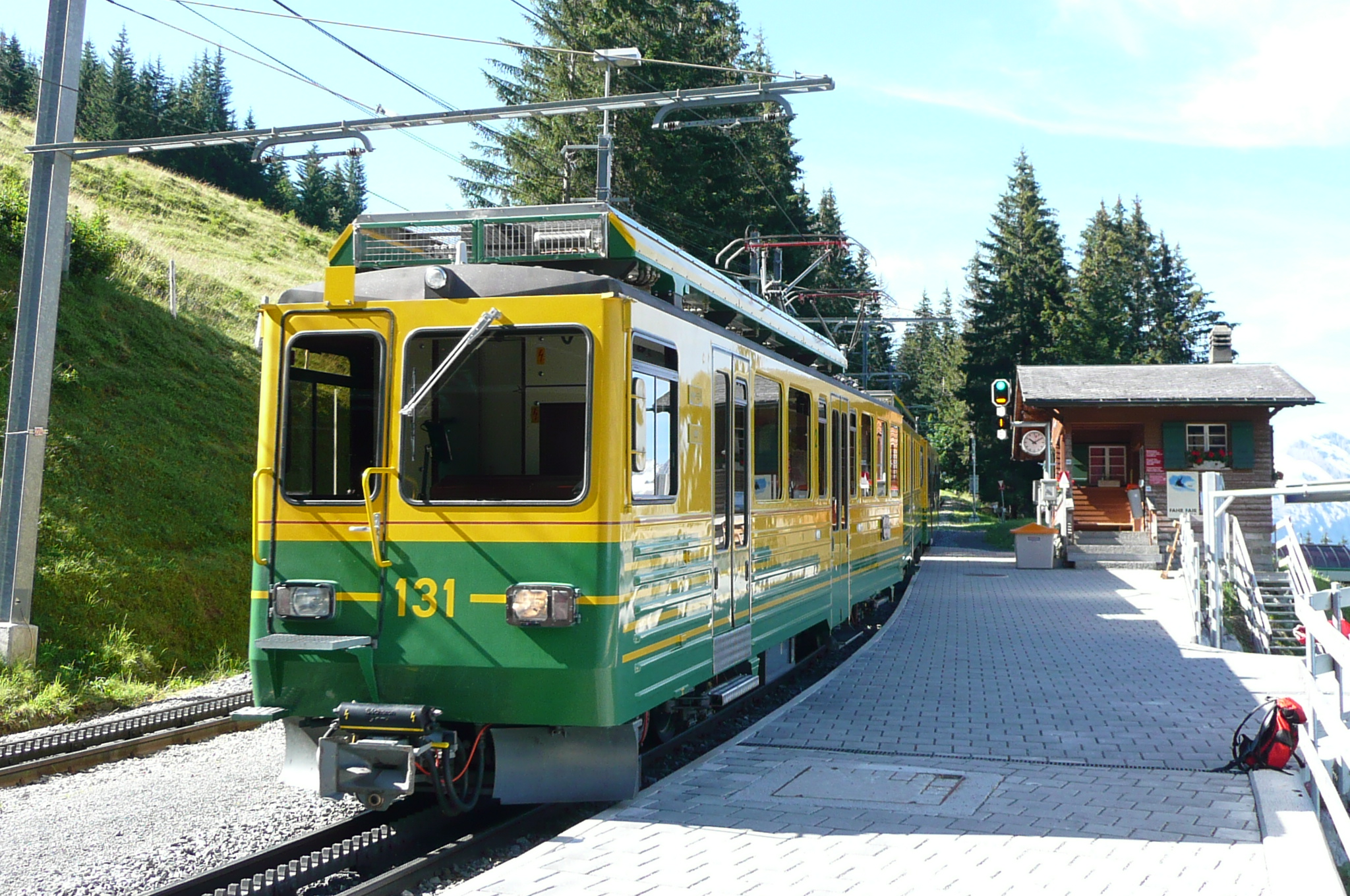
Wengernalp rack EMU BDhe 4/8 131 (2009)
