= Wengernalp railway station =

Railway station in canton of Bern, Switzerland

Wengernalp
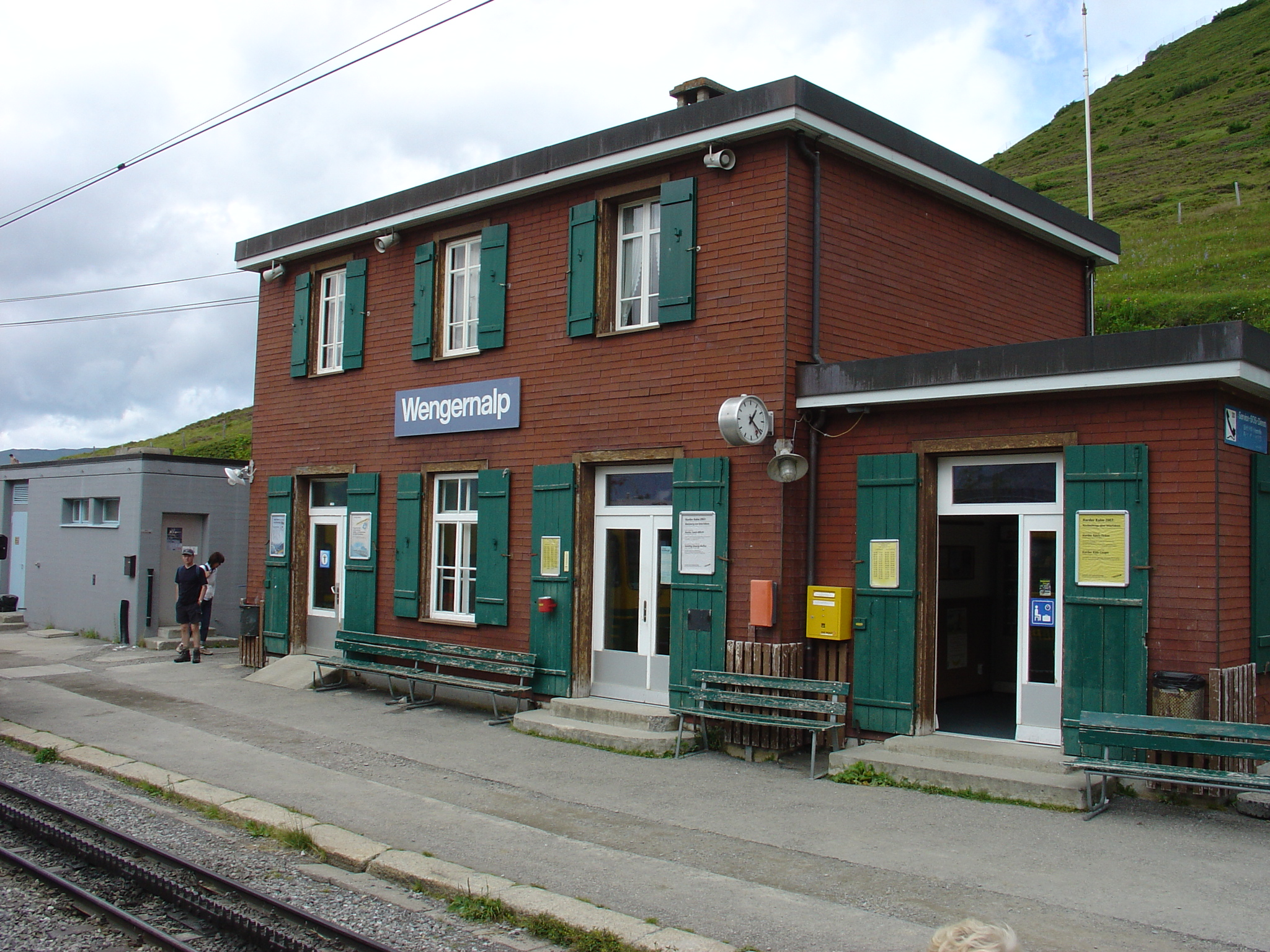

General information
- Location: Wengernalp; Lauterbrunnen, Bern; Switzerland
- Coordinates: 46°34′34″N 07°56′12″E
- Elevation: 1,874 m (6,148 ft)
- Line: Wengernalpbahn

Services
Preceding station	Jungfraubahn AG	Following station
Allmend towards Lauterbrunnen	Wengernalp Railway	Kleine Scheidegg Terminus
Location
- Location within Switzerland

Wengernalp is a request stop railway station in the municipality of Lauterbrunnen in the Swiss canton of Bern. The station is on the Wengernalpbahn (WAB), whose trains operate from Lauterbrunnen to Kleine Scheidegg via Wengen. It takes its name from the alpine meadow of Wengernalp on which it is situated.

The station is served by the following passenger trains:

Operator	Train Type	Route	Typical Frequency	Notes
Wengernalpbahn		Lauterbrunnen - Wengwald - Wengen - Allmend - Wengernalp - Kleine Scheidegg	2 per hour	
