= Wengernalp =

Alpine meadow in Switzerland

Coordinates: 46.5756°N 7.9398°E

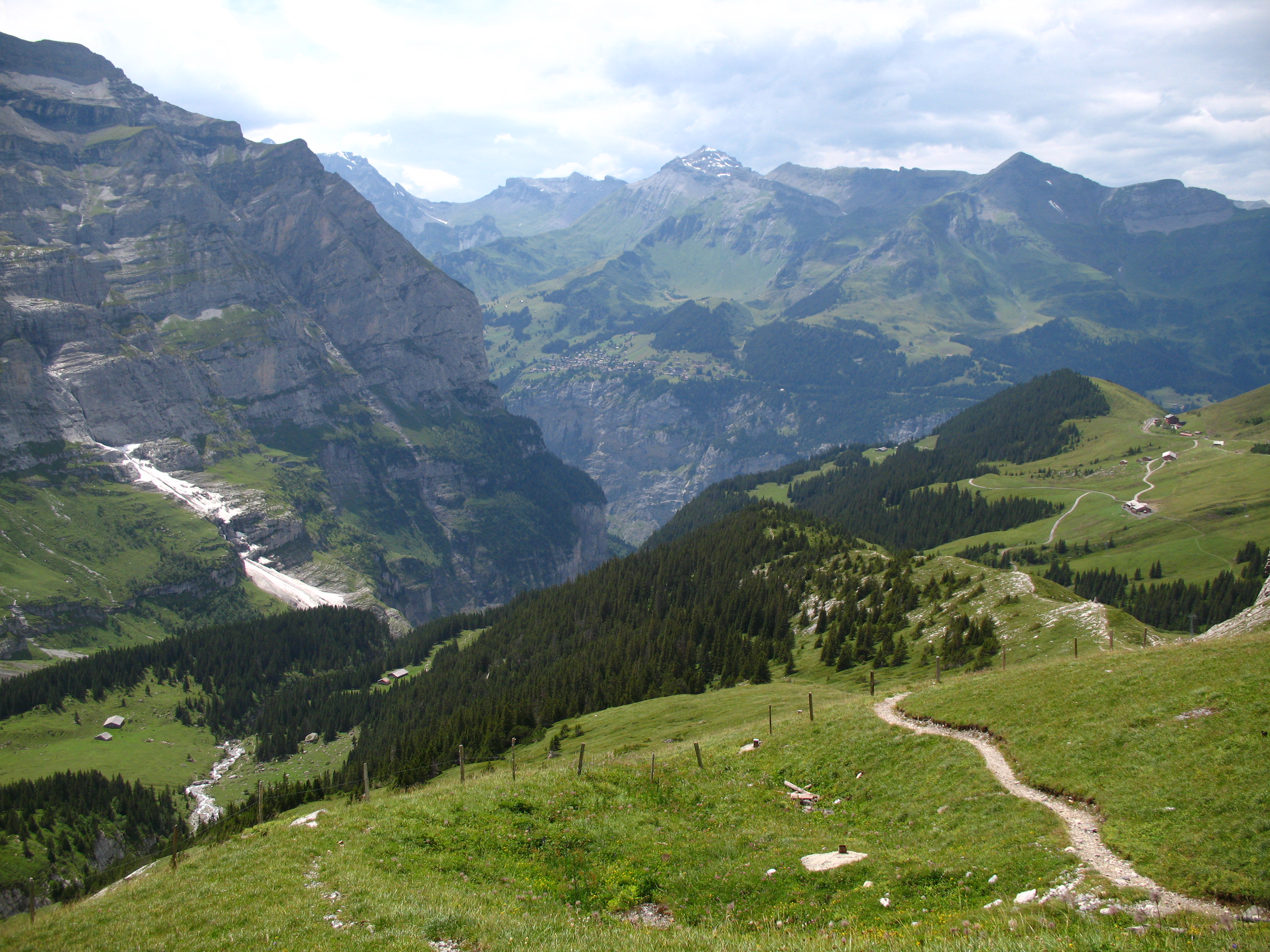
The Wengernalp, to the right, looking down into the Lauterbrunnen valley. Wengernalp station can be seen in the distance to the right hand side; the resort of Mürren is on the far side of the valley.

The Wengernalp is an alpine meadow at an elevation of 1874 m, above Wengen in the Bernese Oberland of Switzerland.

It lies on the southern slopes of the Lauberhorn, just below Kleine Scheidegg, a mountain pass connecting the valleys of Lauterbrunnen and Grindelwald. The pass is traversed by a railway bearing its name, the Wengernalp Railway (WAB) with a railway station serving the locality, the Wengernalp station.

The Wengernalp is a popular for its views over the giants of the Bernese Alps. In fact, it directly faces the huge northern walls of the Jungfrau, Mönch and Eiger, across the extremely narrow Trümmelbach valley.

In 1841 the hotel De la Jungfrau was opened; it was later rebuilt after a fire in 1865.

In winter, the Wengernalp (and Kleine Scheidegg) are part of a large ski area.

Amongst the many historical, famous people who have spent holidays on the Wengernalp are Felix Mendelssohn Bartholdy, Richard Wagner and Peter Tchaikovsky.

== See also ==
- Alps
