= Jungfrau Region =

Region of the Bernese Oberland, Switzerland

Coordinates: 46.616°N 7.928°E

The Jungfrau Region on the Swiss National Map (1:25'000)

The Jungfrau Region (German: Jungfrauregion) is a region of the Bernese Oberland, at the foot of the Bernese Alps. It consists of two valleys south of Interlaken: that of Grindelwald and that of Lauterbrunnen, both drained by the Lütschine.

The Jungfrau Region is named after the highest mountain in the area: the Jungfrau. It is also notably dominated by the Eiger and Mönch. It is a major tourist destination in Switzerland and the Alps, renowned for its mountains and lakes (in particular Lake Thun and Lake Brienz). Both valleys are served by several railways: the Bernese Oberland Railway, the Wengernalp Railway and the Jungfrau Railway. The region also includes numerous cable transports and other facilities.

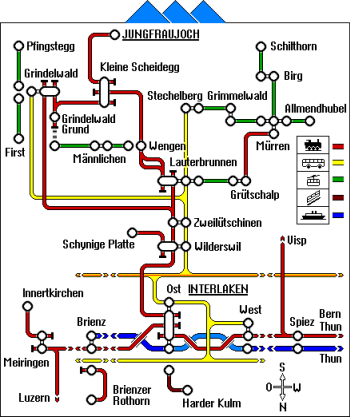
Transport in region

== Towns located within the Jungfrau Region ==
- Grindelwald
- Mürren
- Lauterbrunnen
- Interlaken
- Unterseen
- Wengen
- Wilderswil

There are also smaller towns, with the population not exceeding 30 people.
