= Kleine Scheidegg railway station =

Railway station in Switzerland

Kleine Scheidegg
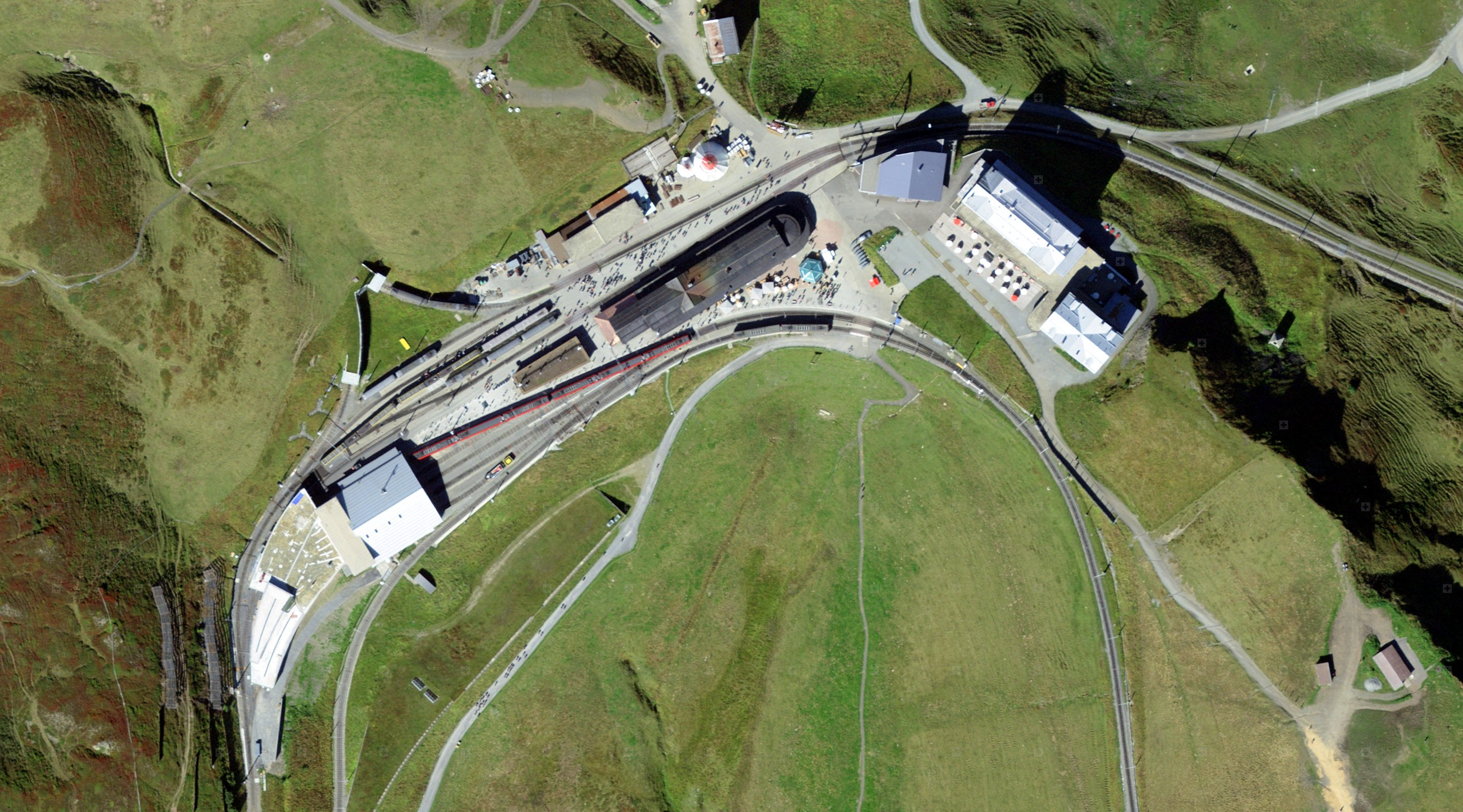
- Aerial view

General information
- Location: Kleine Scheidegg, Lauterbrunnen, Bern; Switzerland
- Coordinates: 46°35′04″N 07°57′34″E
- Elevation: 2,061 m (6,762 ft)
- Lines: Wengernalp Railway; Jungfrau Railway
- Platforms: 6

History
- Opened: 10 August 1892; 134 years ago
- Electrified: 3 June 1909; 117 years ago

Services
Preceding station	Jungfraubahn AG	Following station
Wengernalp towards Lauterbrunnen	Wengernalp Railway	Terminus
Alpiglen towards Grindelwald	Wengernalp Railway	Terminus
Terminus	Jungfrau Railway	Eigergletscher towards Jungfraujoch
Location
- Location within Switzerland Location within Canton of Bern

Kleine Scheidegg is a railway station and hub that is situated on the summit of Kleine Scheidegg, a mountain pass in the Bernese Oberland region of Switzerland. The pass, located between the Lauberhorn and the Eiger's ridge, houses a complex of hotels (e.g. Hotel Bellevue des Alpes) and railway buildings. Administratively, the station is in the municipality of Lauterbrunnen in the canton of Bern, a few metres from the border with the municipality of Grindelwald.

== Description ==
The station is the culminating point of the Wengernalp Railway (WAB), whose trains operate to Kleine Scheidegg from Lauterbrunnen via Wengen, and separately from Grindelwald. It is also the lower terminus of the Jungfrau Railway (JB), whose trains climb within the Eiger to the Jungfraujoch. All passengers travelling to the Jungfraujoch, or between Lauterbrunnen and Grindelwald, must change trains at the station. At 2,061 metres (6,762 ft) above sea level, it is the highest railway hub in Switzerland and Europe, and the third highest railway crossing on the continent. (Note: After the Bernina and Furka railway lines) The widest section of the station has about 10 parallel tracks.

WAB trains from Lauterbrunnen enter the station at its western end, and from Grindelwald at its eastern end, but no through trains are operated. This is principally because of the need, for safety reasons, to have each train's motorcar or locomotive at its downhill end. The WAB tracks at Kleine Scheidegg includes a partially underground wye track to allow trains to be reversed, opposite to the Jungfrau Railway tracks, but this is not used for trains in passenger service.

The WAB and JB use different rail gauges, different electrification systems and different rack railway technology, and are not physically connected. The depot of the JB is located at Kleine Scheidegg, but not the line's workshops. These are located at Eigergletscher station, one stop up the line.

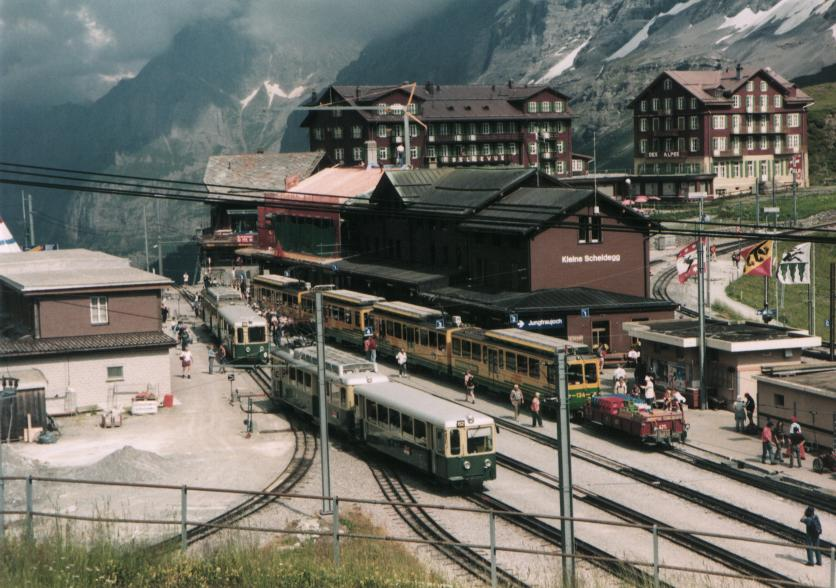
The WAB side of the station, with the JB just visible behind the station building

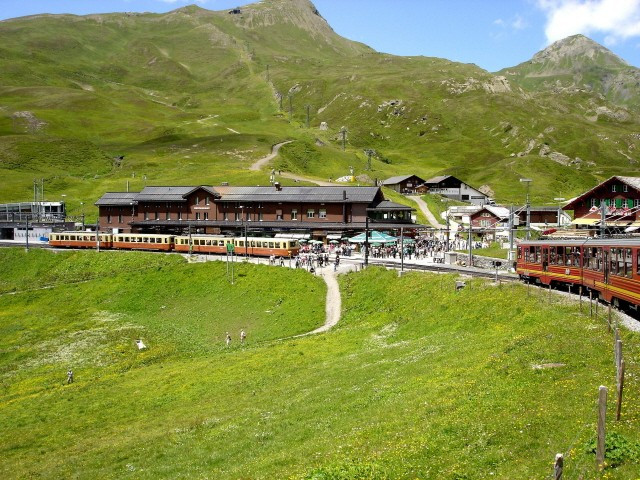
The JB side of the station

== Services ==
The station is served by the following passenger trains:

Operator	Train Type	Route	Typical Frequency	Notes
Wengernalp Railway		Lauterbrunnen - Wengwald - Wengen - Allmend - Wengernalp - Kleine Scheidegg	2 per hour	
Wengernalp Railway		Grindelwald - Grindelwald Grund - Brandegg - Alpiglen - Kleine Scheidegg	2 per hour	
Jungfrau Railway		Kleine Scheidegg - Eigergletscher - Eigerwand - Eismeer - Jungfraujoch	2 per hour	

== See also ==
- List of highest railway stations in Switzerland
- Rail transport in Switzerland
