= Wengen railway station =

Railway station in the canton of Bern, Switzerland

Wengen
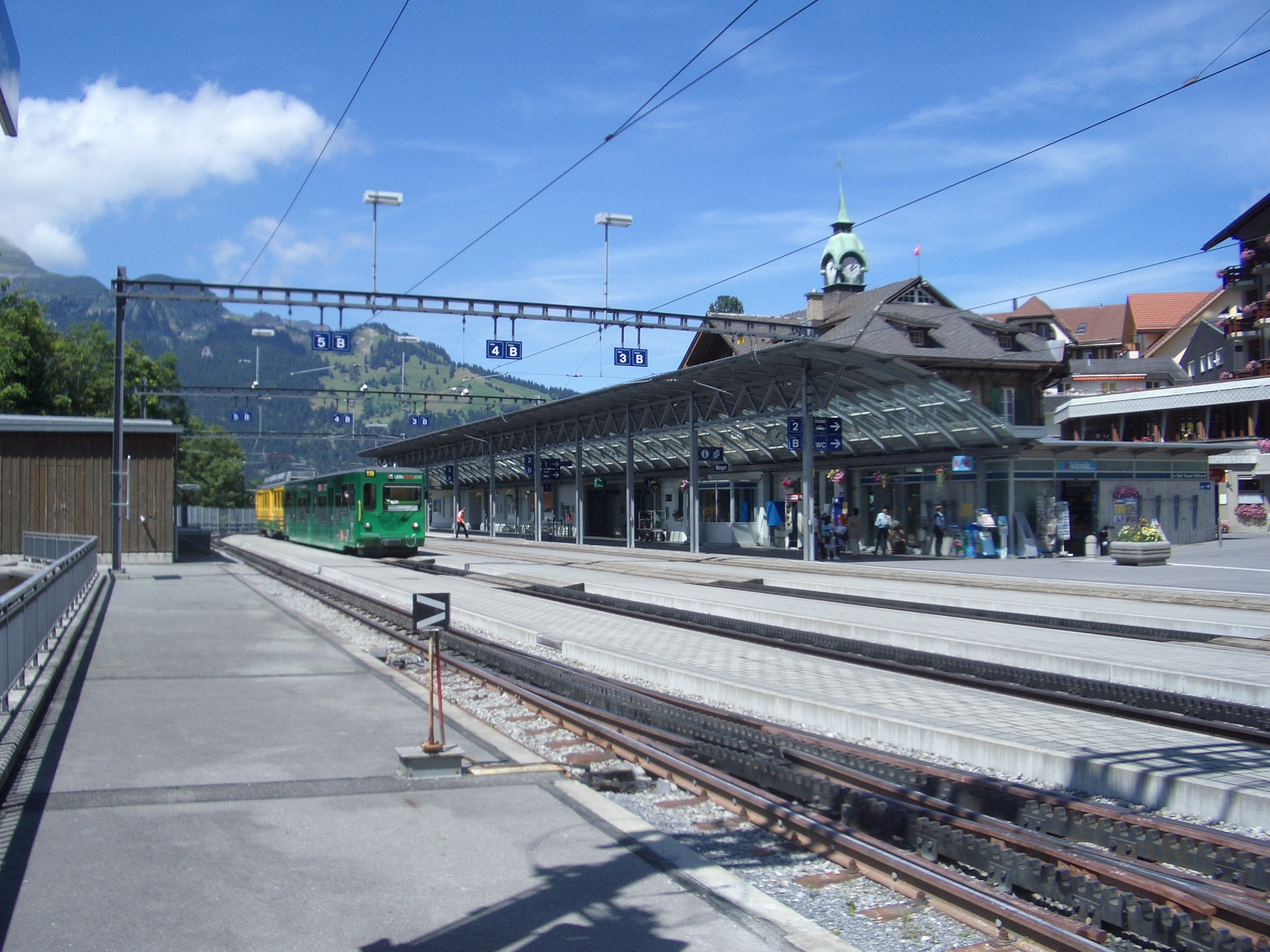

General information
- Location: Wengen; Lauterbrunnen, Bern; Switzerland
- Coordinates: 46°36′18″N 7°55′16″E
- Elevation: 1,275 m (4,183 ft)
- Line: Wengernalpbahn

History
- Opened: 18 April 1892
- Electrified: 3 June 1909

Services
Preceding station	Jungfraubahn AG	Following station
Wengwald towards Lauterbrunnen	Wengernalp Railway	Allmend towards Kleine Scheidegg
Location
- Location within Switzerland

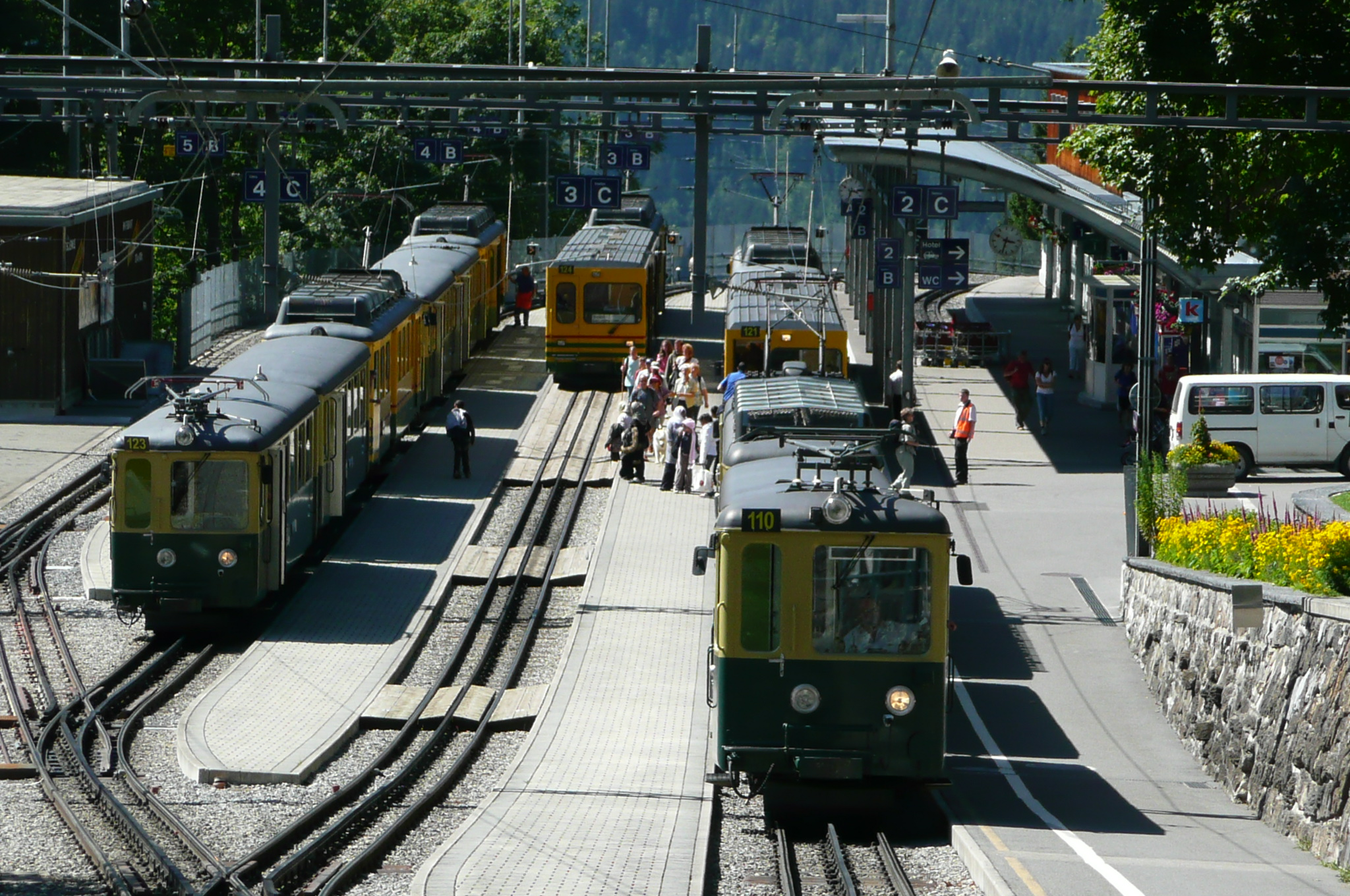
Platforms at Wengen station

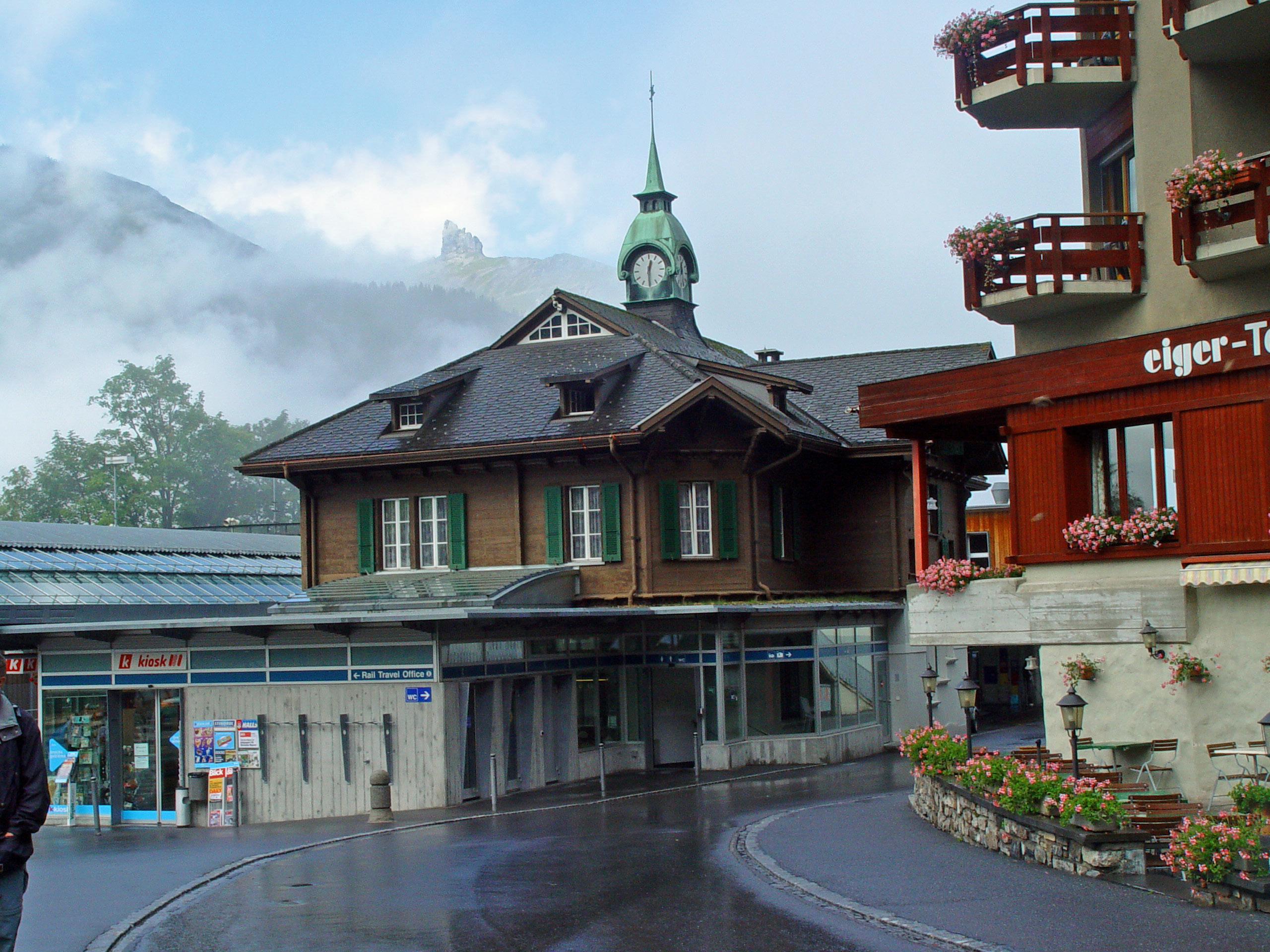
Station exterior

Wengen is a railway station in the car free resort of Wengen in the Bernese Oberland region of Switzerland. The station is on the Wengernalpbahn (WAB), whose trains operate from Lauterbrunnen to Kleine Scheidegg via Wengen. Administratively, the station is in the municipality of Lauterbrunnen in the canton of Bern.

== History ==
The station was opened on 18 April 1892. In 1899 the station was rebuilt and a depot was constructed. In 1905 the station was reconstructed with level platforms, having previously had an angle of 73°. In 1932 the newspaper kiosk was opened, and in 1976 the platforms were reconstructed.

In 1910, a new route from Lauterbrunnen to Wengen was opened to replace the more direct but steeper original routing. However the original routing remained in use for freight traffic until 2009, when the track was lifted. The junction between the two routes can still be seen, just to the Lauterbrunnen side of Wengen station.

Wengen station was rebuilt in three phases. Phase 1 was completed in 1992 at a cost of CHF 12m. This comprised a waste transfer station with an integrated concrete plant and a new railway underpass to access the freight facility. This included a tank to hold 160,000 litres of heating oil.

The second phase began in 1994 included the construction of a baggage and freight hall and cost CHF 37m. It also included a new curved glass roof over the platforms. The opening ceremony took place on 21 November 1997.

The third phase estimated at CHF 3m expanded the track at the new station. This work was completed in 1998.

== Operation ==
Wengen is a car free resort without road access, and the railway is therefore essential both for passenger access and for the supply of goods. The passenger station has five tracks, four for through trains, and a terminating track facing Lauterbrunnen.

Freight trains run regularly from Lauterbrunnen to Wengen, serving a freight station with its own low level sidings in the basement of the passenger station. Trains carrying building materials such as cement, operate to the far side of the passenger station, where they can be tipped directly into lineside hoppers.

The station is served by the following passenger trains:

Operator	Train Type	Route	Typical Frequency	Notes
Wengernalpbahn		Lauterbrunnen - Wengwald - Wengen - Allmend - Wengernalp - Kleine Scheidegg	2 per hour	

Wengen is also the connection to the Wengen–Männlichen aerial cableway that runs to near the summit of the Männlichen mountain. The lower terminal of the cableway is some 250 m (820 ft) from the station.
