= Wengwald railway station =

Railway station in canton of Bern, Switzerland

Wengwald
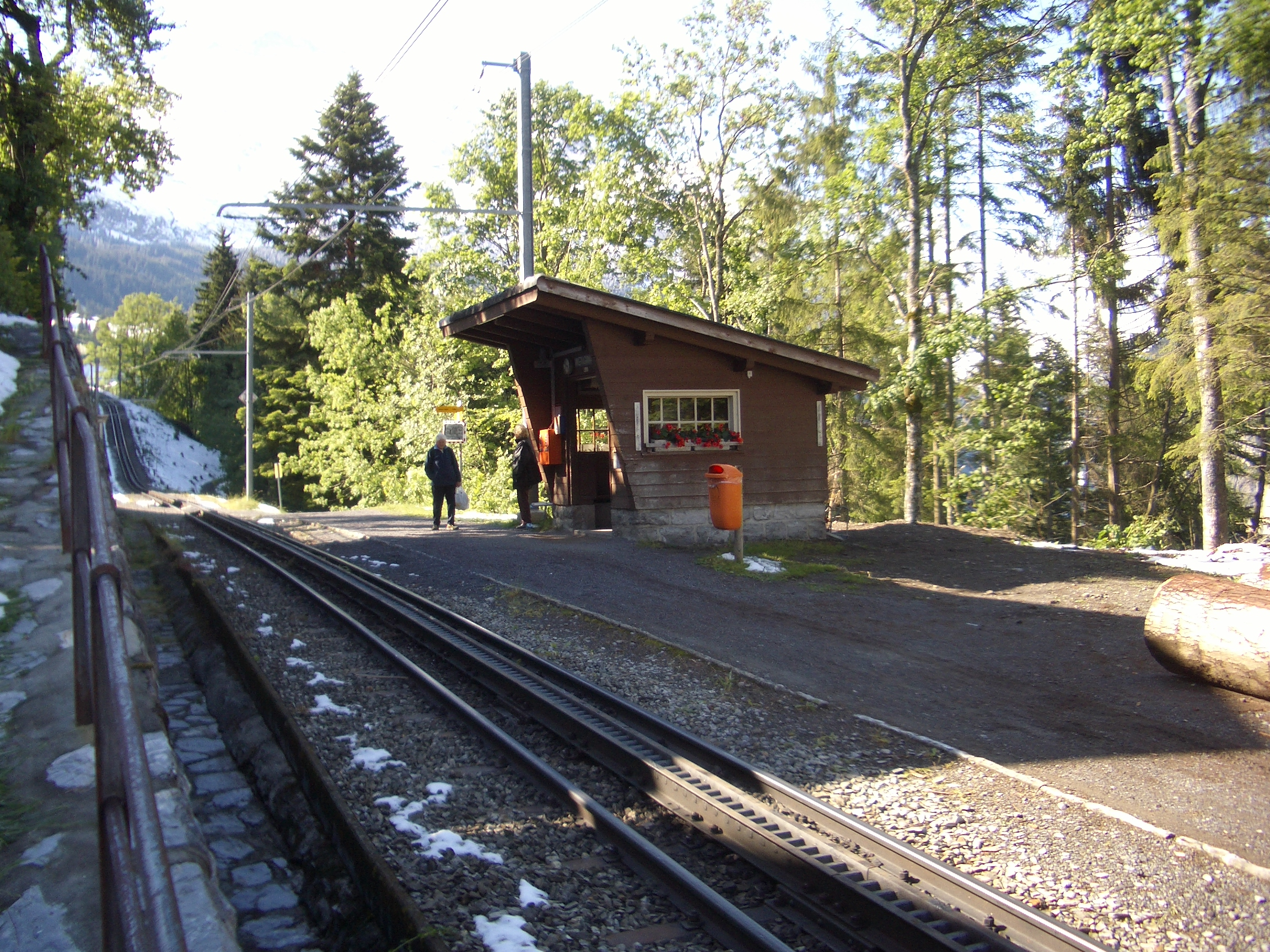

General information
- Location: Wengwald; Lauterbrunnen, Bern; Switzerland
- Coordinates: 46°36′36″N 07°54′48″E
- Elevation: 1,182 m (3,878 ft)
- Line: Wengernalpbahn

History
- Opened: 7 June 1910

Services
Preceding station	Jungfraubahn AG	Following station
Lauterbrunnen Terminus	Wengernalp Railway	Wengen towards Kleine Scheidegg
Location
- Location within Switzerland

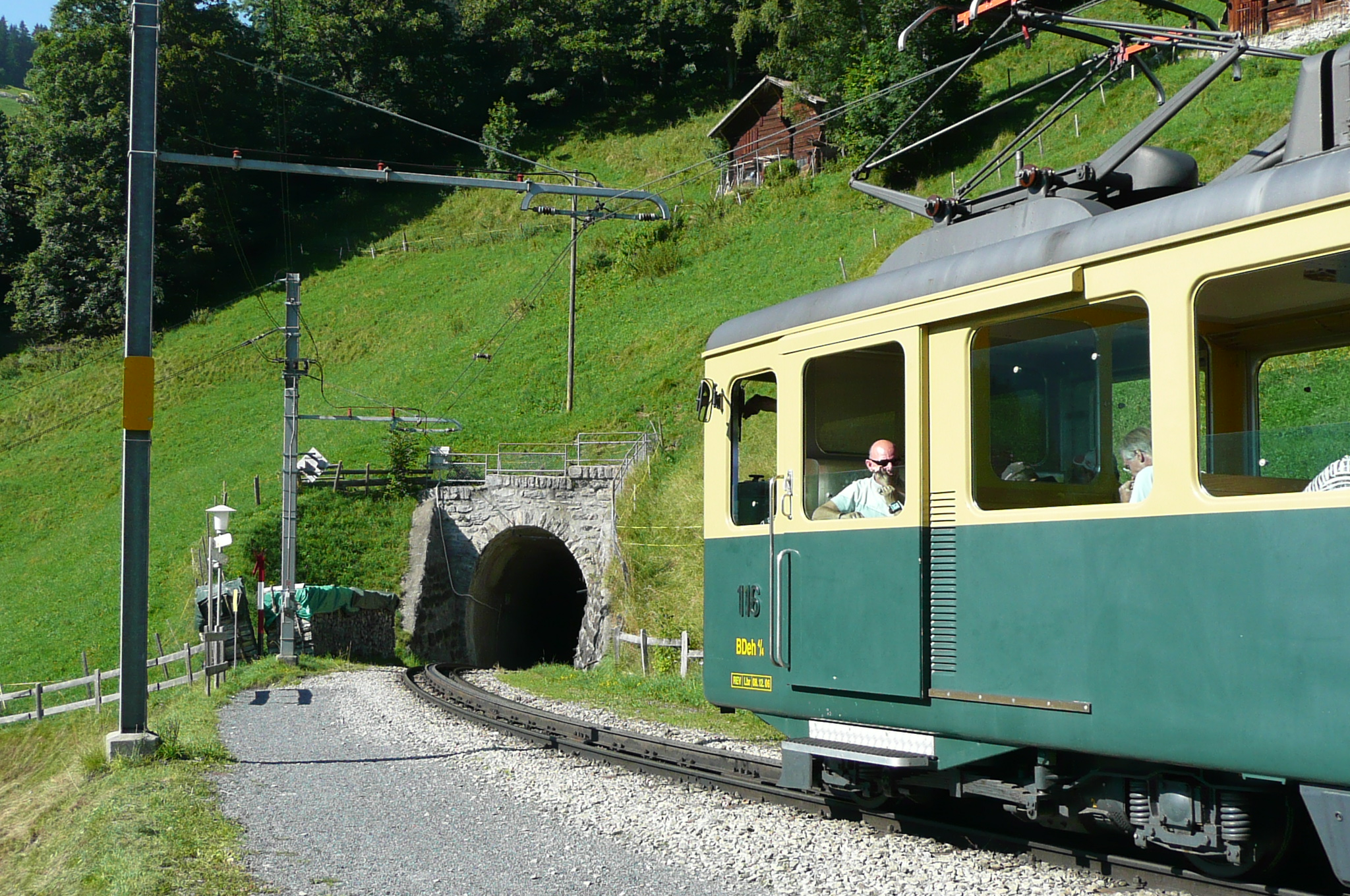
WAB train leaving Wengwald station for the tunnel

Wengwald is a request stop railway station in the municipality of Lauterbrunnen in the Swiss canton of Bern. The station is on the Wengernalpbahn (WAB), whose trains operate from Lauterbrunnen to Kleine Scheidegg via Wengen.

The station is located on the new line from Lauterbrunnen to Wengen, which opened in 1910 to replace the more direct but steeper original routing. It is immediately uphill of a 180 degree helical tunnel which the line uses in order to reduce the gradient.

The station is served by the following passenger trains:

Operator	Train Type	Route	Typical Frequency	Notes
Wengernalpbahn		Lauterbrunnen - Wengwald - Wengen - Allmend - Wengernalp - Kleine Scheidegg	2 per hour	
