= Wengernalp Railway =

Rack railway in the Bernese Oberland of Switzerland

Coordinates: 46°34′34″N 7°56′38″E

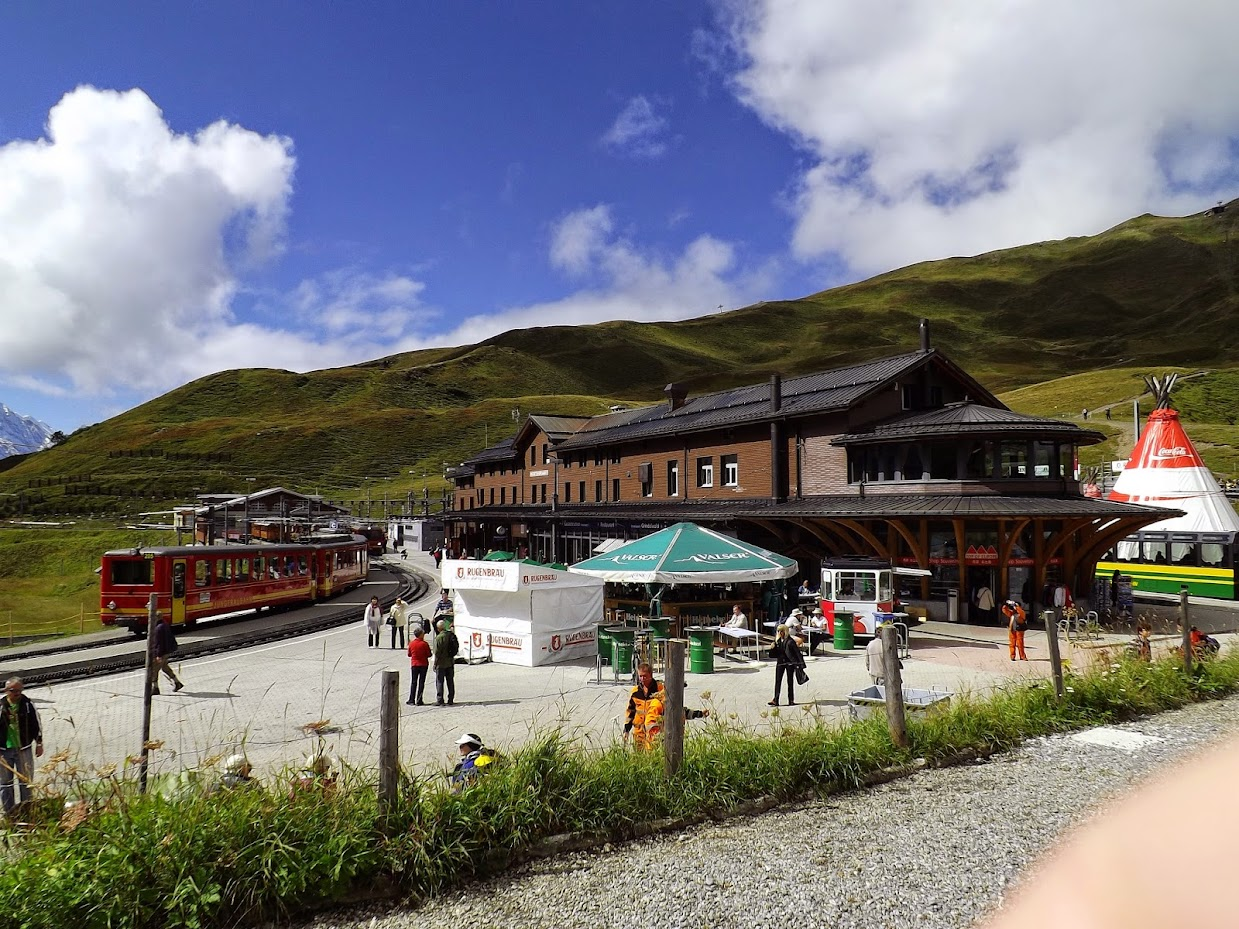
- Station at Kleine Scheidegg

Overview
- Native name: Wengernalpbahn WAB
- Status: operating daily
- Owner: Wengernalpbahn AG
- Locale: Bernese Highlands
- Termini: Grindelwald, Lauterbrunnen; Kleine Scheidegg
- Stations: 10
- Website: WAB

Service
- Type: Mountain rack railway
- Services: 2
- Operator: WAB

History
- Opened: 1893

Technical
- Line length: 19.11 km (11.87 mi)
- Number of tracks: Single track with passing loops
- Character: Commuter (between Wengen and Lauterbrunnen), but mainly touristic railway
- Rack system: Strub / Von Roll
- Track gauge: 800 mm (2 ft 7 1/2 in)
- Electrification: 100%, 1500 V DC, overhead wire
- Highest elevation: 2,061 m (6,762 ft)
- Maximum incline: 250‰, 25%

The Wengernalp Railway (German: Wengernalpbahn, WAB) is a 19.11 kilometres (11.87 mi) long rack railway line in Switzerland. It runs from Lauterbrunnen to Grindelwald via Wengen and Kleine Scheidegg, making it the world's longest continuous rack and pinion railway. The name refers to the alpine meadow of Wengernalp, above Wengen.

The line is normally operated in two sections, with trains from either direction terminating at Kleine Scheidegg, where most passengers transfer to the Jungfrau Railway for the continuation of the journey to the highest railway station in Europe at Jungfraujoch. There are no generally accessible roads to Wengen, and the train is the principal means of access.

The line is owned by the Wengernalpbahn AG, a subsidiary of the Jungfraubahn Holding AG, a holding company that also owns the Jungfraubahn and Bergbahn Lauterbrunnen–Mürren, Harderbahn, and Firstbahn. Through that holding company it is part of the Allianz - Jungfrau Top of Europe marketing alliance, which also includes the separately owned Berner Oberland-Bahn and Schynige Platte-Bahn.

== History ==
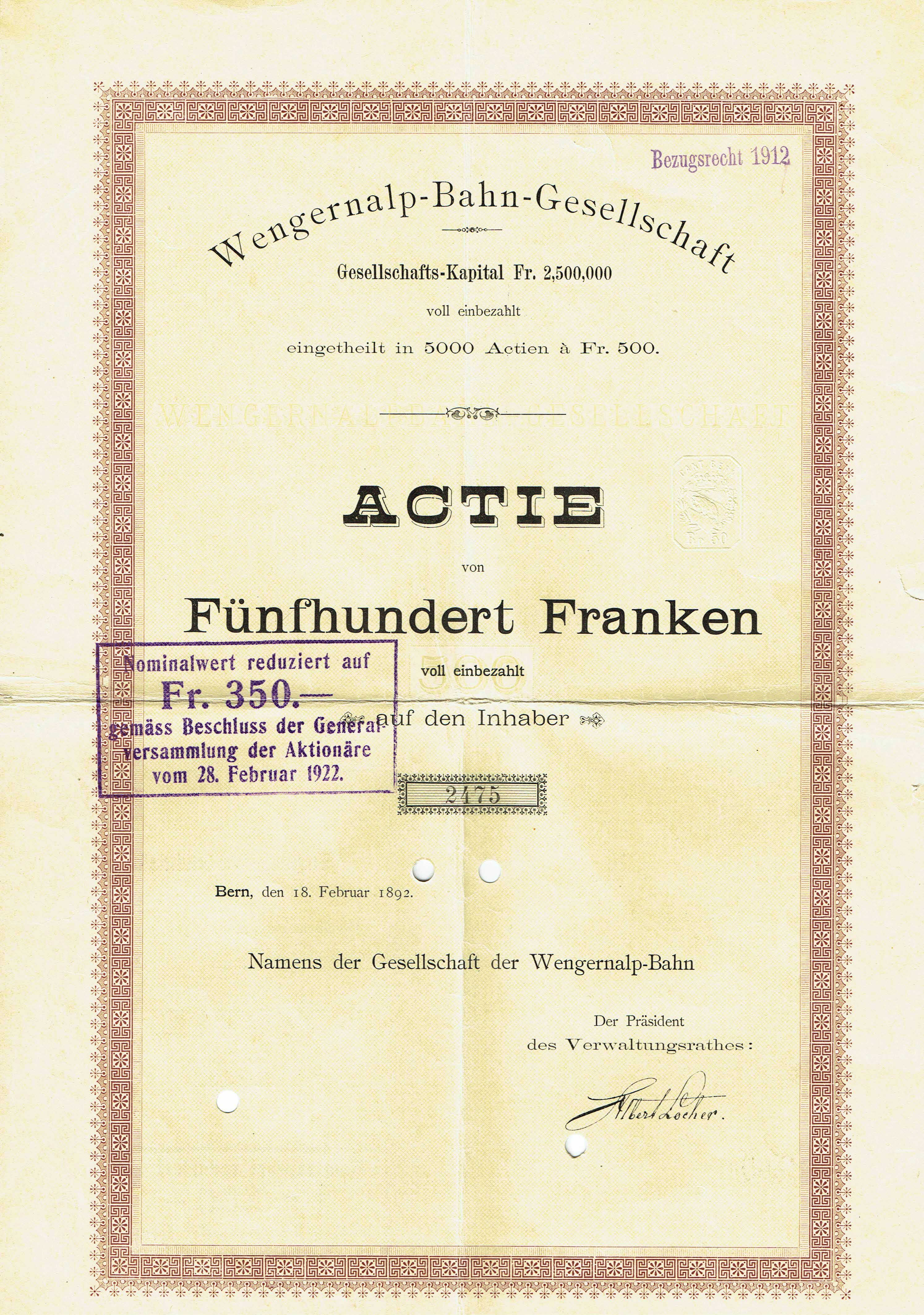
Share of the Wengernalp-Bahn-Gesellschaft, issued 18. February 1892

In 1875, the first plans for a railway on the route later taken by the Wengernalp line were drawn up, but the high projected costs meant that the concession expired. Fifteen years later on 27 June 1890, Leo Heer-Bétrix gained a new 80-year concession to build and operate the railway. The Wengernalpbahn was founded.

Construction work commenced on 20 April 1891 and the following year the first steam locomotive reached Wengen on 18 April and Kleine Scheidegg on 10 August. The full length of the line, from Lauterbrunnen to Grindelwald, opened on 20 June 1893 as a summer only service. The construction budget for the entire project amounted to CHF 4,272,394. At the opening, the railway had eight steam locomotives, nine passenger coaches and three freight cars. In the first year of operation 37,742 passengers were transported.

Between 1 October 1898 and 1 June 1899, sections of the route between Wengen and Wengernalp of approximately 1.7 kilometres (1.1 mi) which had a maximum gradient of 25% were rebuilt on new alignments to reduce the gradient to 18%. As a result, the Wengernalpbahn company introduced a new innovation to improve efficiency. After the arrival of the six or seven single trains from Lauterbrunnen in Wengen (one engine and one carriage each), some of the locomotives were uncoupled from these trains and the carriages connected to the other trains. The continuation of the journey to Kleine Scheidegg took place with two carriages but only one engine. The freed engines returned to Lauterbrunnen to be put into service for the next train.

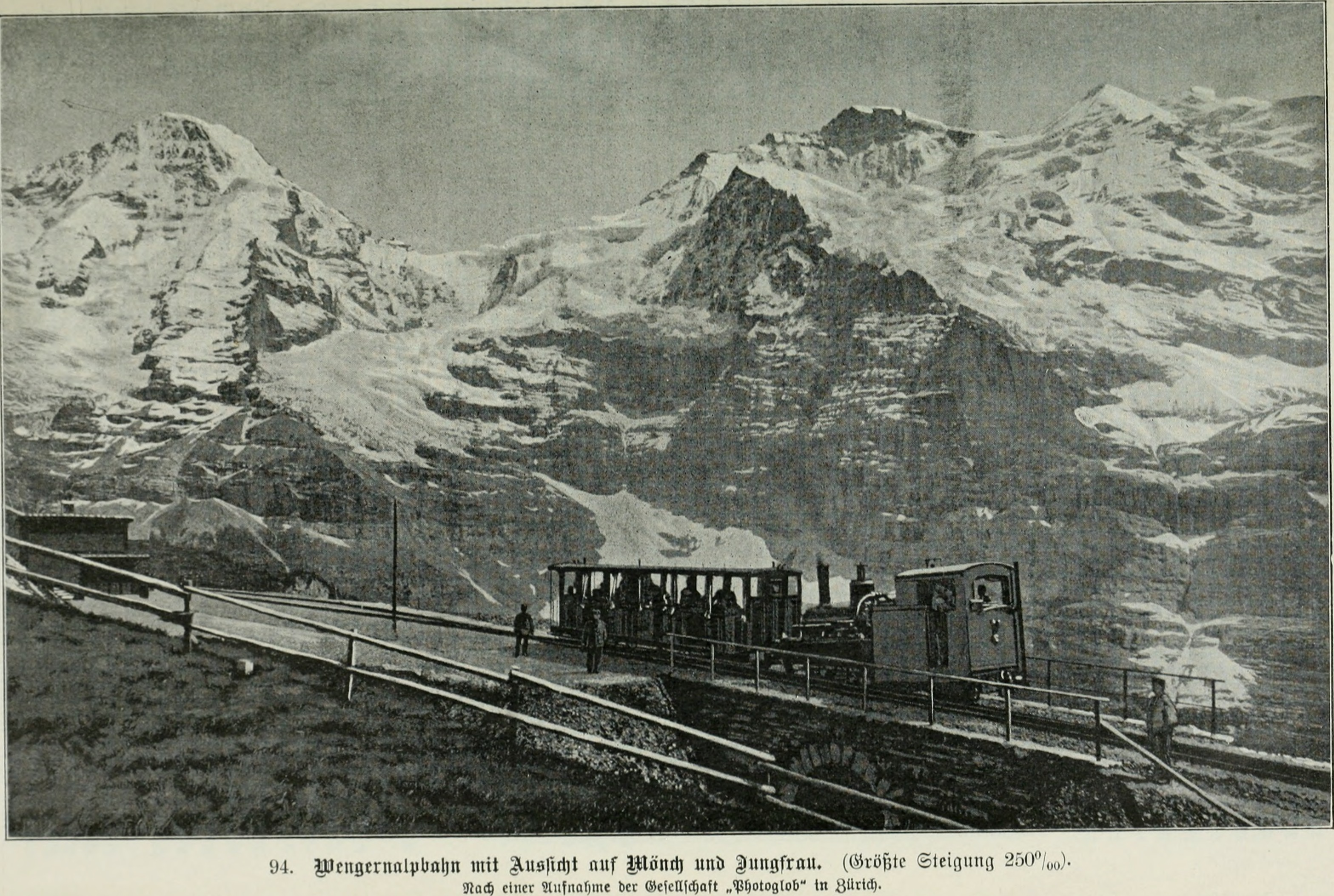
Steam locomotive at Wengernalp railway station before 1913

Due to the severe gradient between Lauterbrunnen and Wengen of 25%, the company planned a new longer line. This was in conjunction with planned improvements to electrify the service and would also allow them to operate two carriages with each engine. The company delayed their final decision on this new line pending a decision for a rival cable car service from Lauterbrunnen to Wengen which was eventually rejected. In 1907 the company received approval to construct their new line. The new line began construction in 1908 and reduced the maximum gradient to 18%.

On 12 July 1909 a landslide between Lauterbrunnen and Wengen on the old line resulted in passengers having to change trains and walk between the two sections divided by the landslide.

The first locomotive with a freight service travelled over the new line from Wengen to Lauterbrunnen on 21 October 1909.

The electrification of the line between Lauterbrunnen and Kleine Scheidegg was completed on 3 June 1909 using 1500 V DC, with electric locomotives positioned, for safety reasons, at the lower end of the trains. The section between Grindelwald and Kleine Scheidegg followed on 24 June 1910. The conversion to electric propulsion cost CHF 1,600,000. Steam operation ceased in 1912. Locomotive number 1 was sold to the Brienz Rothorn Railway in 1911 and became their locomotive number 5. The remaining 19 locomotives were scrapped.

On 7 July 1910 the new route was opened for passenger service between Lauterbrunnen to Wengen. The older route was retained for nearly a hundred more years, being finally decommissioned and dismantled in 2009 because of the steep gradient of 25% and concern over geological stability on parts of the route. This new route also resulted in the operation of a winter service between Lauterbrunnen and Wengen for the first time.

In 1911 winter operators commenced from Wengen to Wengernalp and from 1913 as far as Kleine Scheidegg. Year round operations over the same section started in 1925. Winter operations between Grindelwald and Kleine Scheidegg started in 1934, followed by year round operations in 1960.

In 1925 the carriage shed at Grindelwald Grund was adapted increasing the length to 40 metres (130 ft) to accommodate new rolling stock. In 1929 a new 72 metres (236 ft) shed was opened in Lauterbrunnen. The station building at Grindelwald Grund was rebuilt in 1939.

In 1942, the headquarters of the railway moved from Zürich to Interlaken. In 1947, the first motorcoaches were purchased. The following year the partly underground turning triangle at Kleine Scheidegg was constructed which allowed trains to run from Lauterbrunnen to Grindelwald via Kleine Scheidegg.

In 1948 the railway commissioned three new 16 metres (52 ft) long, 600 hp motor cars from the Winterthur locomotive factory and Brown, Boveri in Baden. These cars shortened the Lauterbrunnen-Wengen-Kleine Scheidegg journey by 27 minutes, and the Grindelwald-Kleine Scheidegg journey by 23 minutes. With these new cars, it was now be possible to travel up to Kleine Scheidegg from Lauterbrunnen in 40 minutes, and from Grindelwald in 35 minutes.

In 1990, an avalanche shelter was built on the Lauterbrunnen side of the operation, whilst in 1995 Wengen station was rebuilt to include a freight delivery terminal. In 2005, Wengernalp station platforms were extended from 127 m to 181 m usable length. In 2011, a new double track loop was opened between Wengen and Allmend, allowing the introduction of a clock-face timetable between Lauterbrunnen and Kleine Scheidegg.

== Operations ==
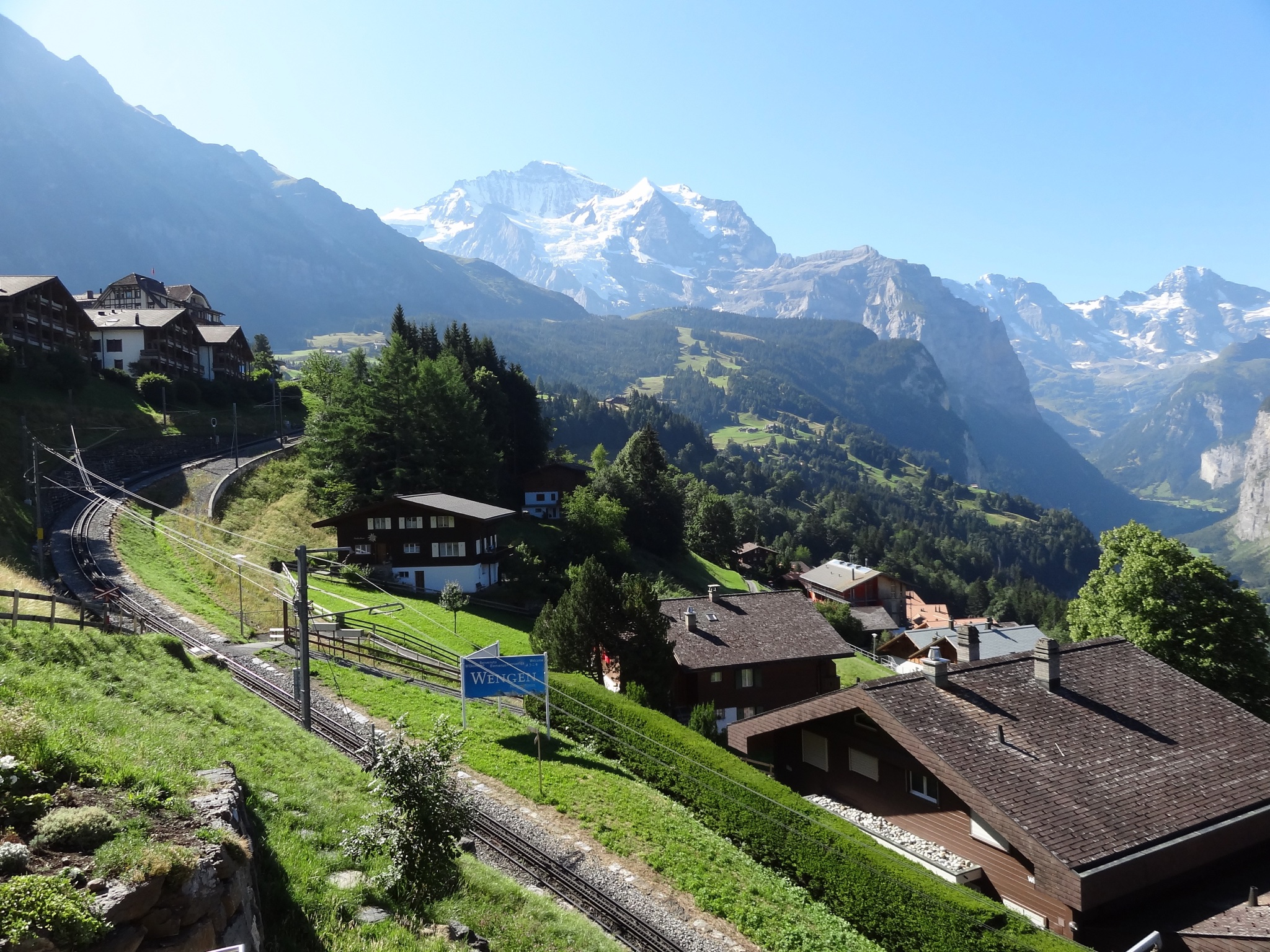
The line leading into Wengen. The Jungfrau is visible in the background.

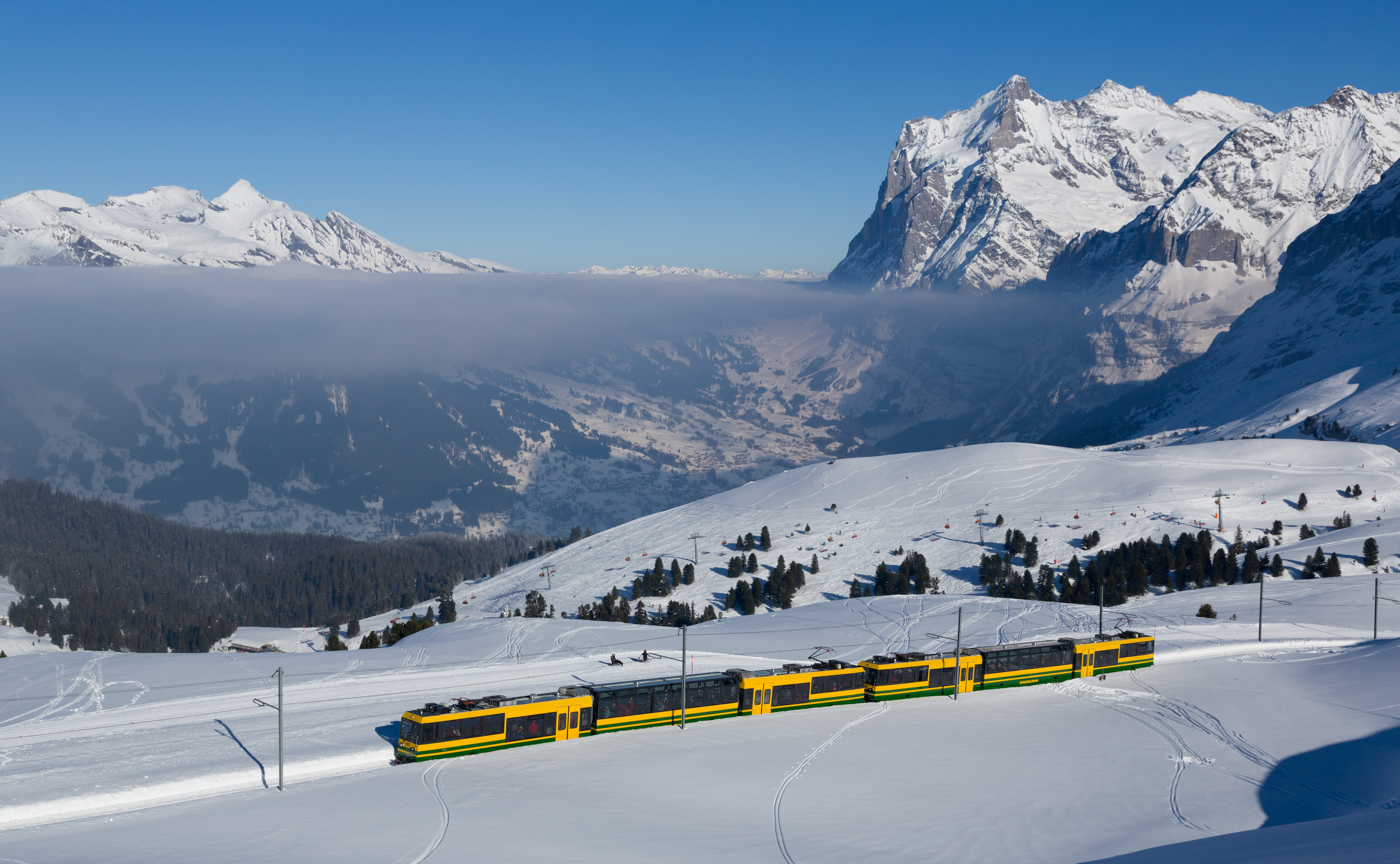
Just below Kleine Scheidegg, view down to Grindelwald.

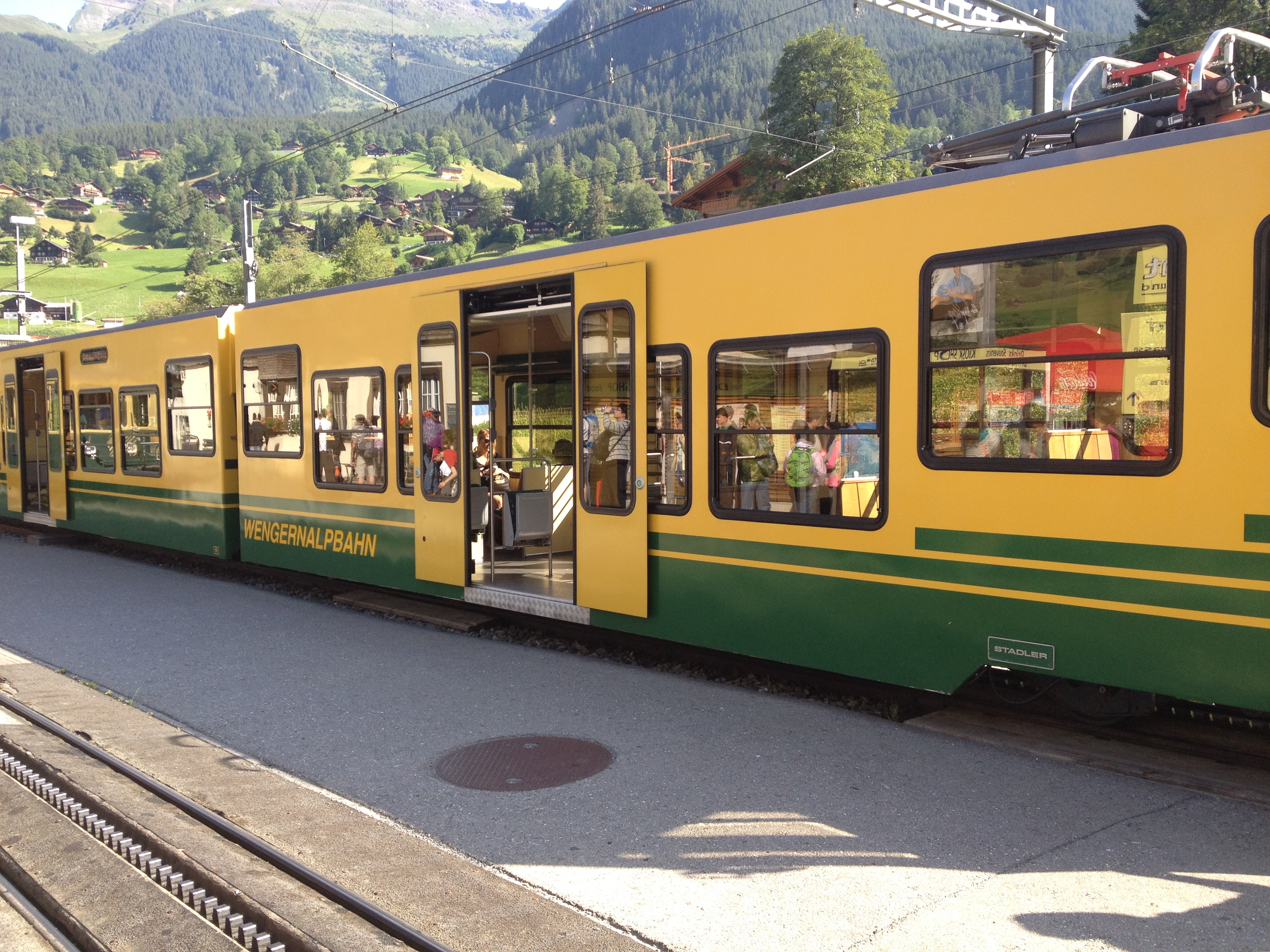
A train waits at Grindelwald Grund.

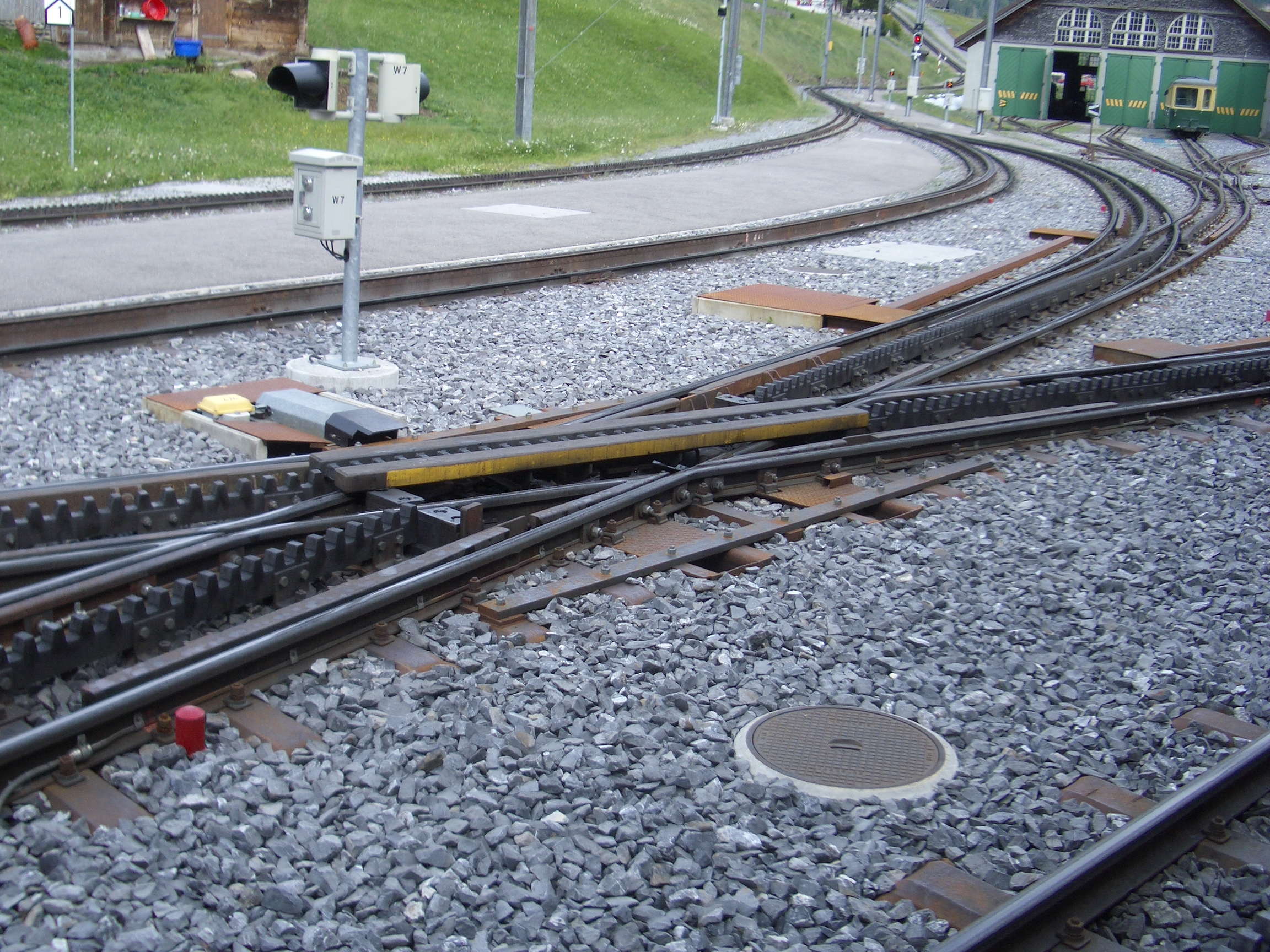
Diamond crossing at Grindelwald Grund. The Strub rack is shown clearly, with a short Riggenbach section across the crossing.

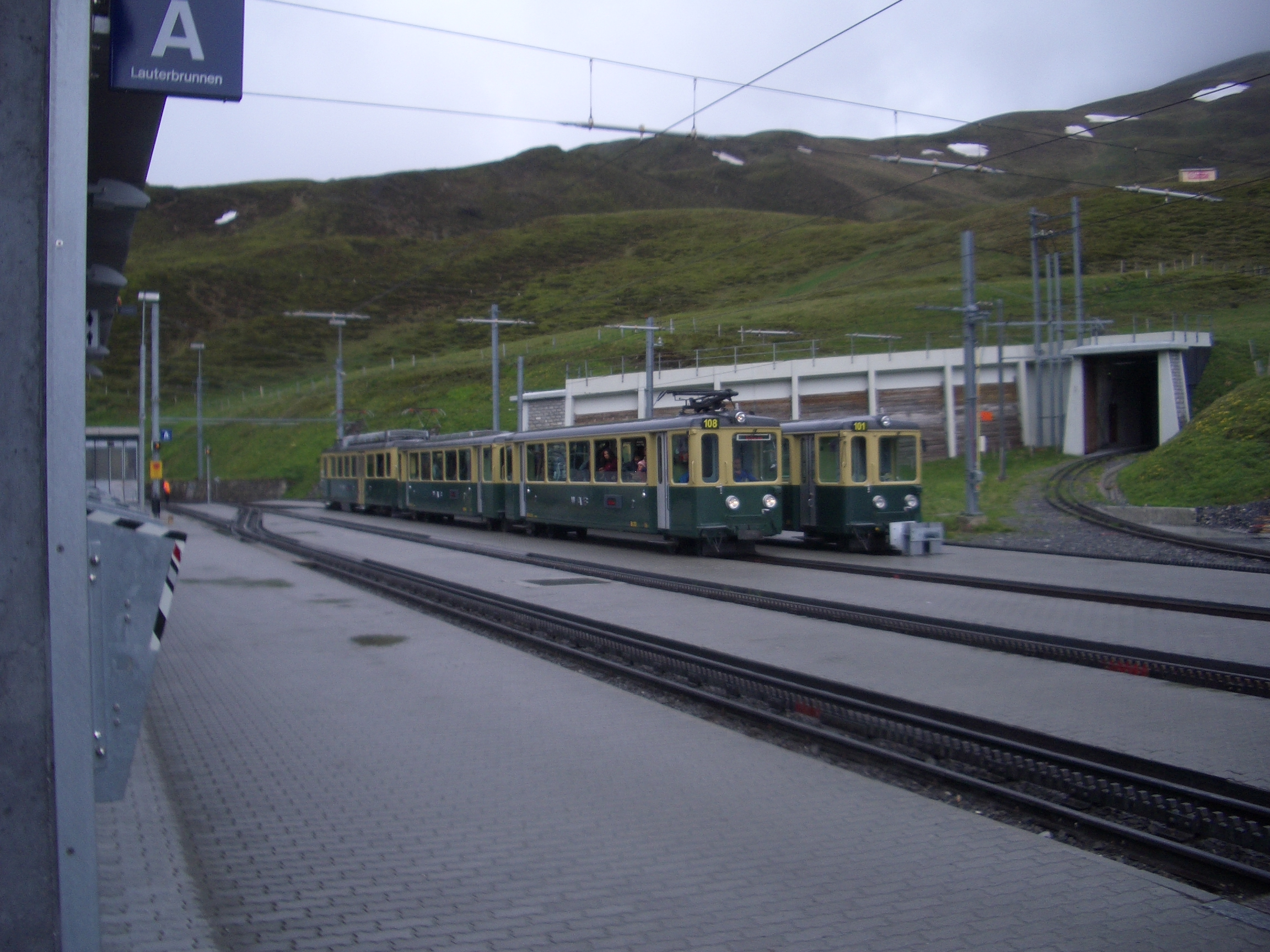
Triangular junction at Kleine Scheidegg, partly built into the mountain.

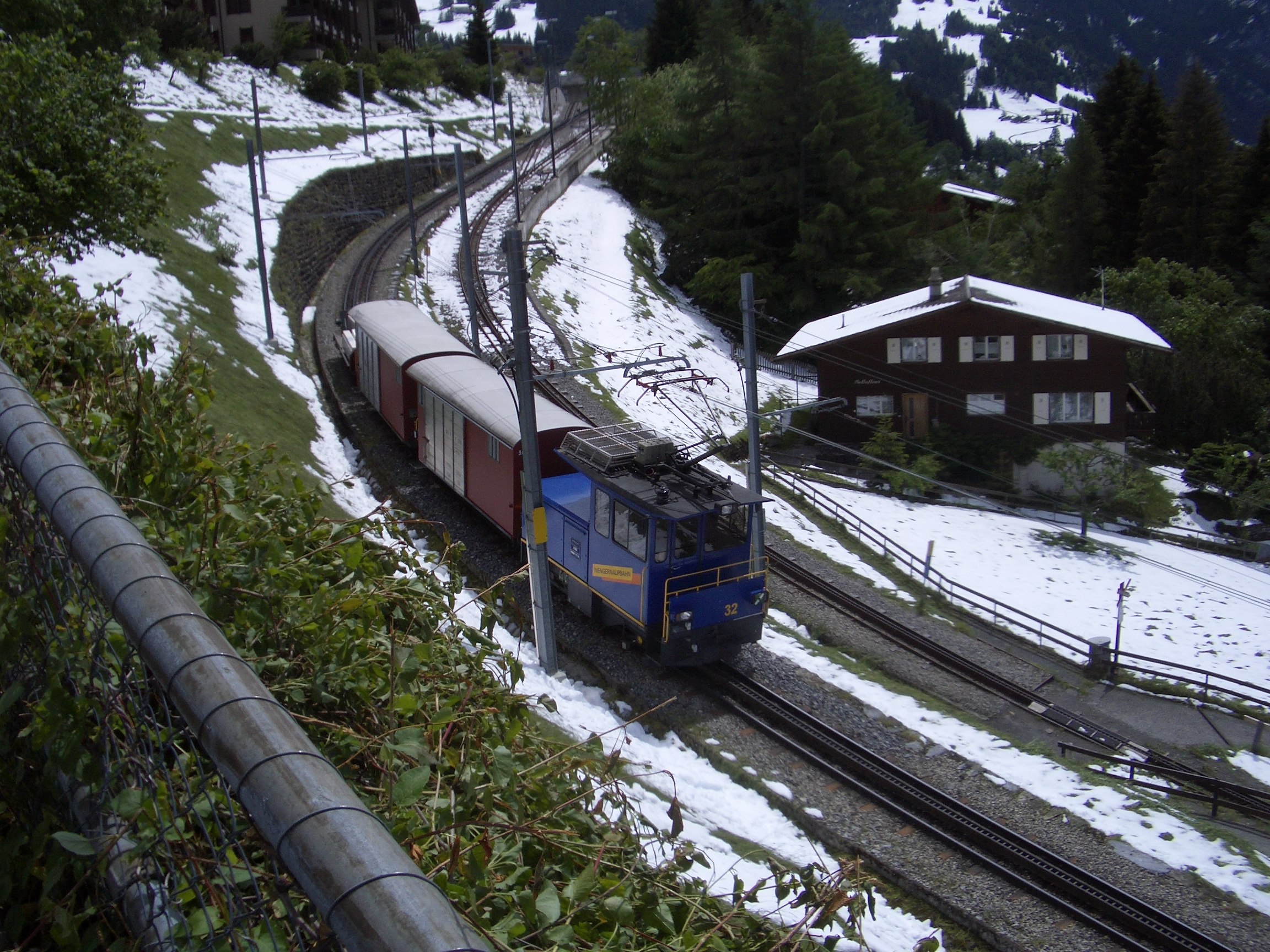
Locomotive 32 pushes a freight train approaching Wengen with the old original line just visible approaching the new one.

The line is built to 800 mm gauge (2 ft 7 1/2 in gauge), and uses the Riggenbach rack system, as modified by Arnold Pauli. Modern stock uses Strub rack system.

Nowadays, most passenger trains are made up of railcars, the powered car still being positioned at the lower end of the train, and so train compositions do not usually cross Kleine Scheidegg to travel directly from Lauterbrunnen over to Grindelwald. However, a triangular junction specially built into the mountainside at Kleine Scheidegg allows the train to be turned if necessary so that it can also be used on the other side of the col. The newest of these trains reach 28 km/h on the steepest stretch.

At peak periods, additional trains can be put into operation at short intervals ahead of the scheduled train, allowing capacity to be optimised according to demand. This demands an extremely flexible organisation procedure and enormous care and attention with regard to dispatching trains. Since most of the line is single track, the extra trains display a green disk with a diagonal white line on the front to indicate to station staff and signal operators that there is a train following in the same direction

The busiest stretch of railway runs from Lauterbrunnen to Wengen as this is also used to transport goods to traffic-free Wengen.

The railway operates two workshops at Lauterbrunnen and Grindelwald Grund.

=== Stations ===
The line serves the following stations:

- Lauterbrunnen
- Wengwald
- Wengen
- Allmend
- Wengernalp
- Kleine Scheidegg
- Alpiglen
- Brandegg
- Grindelwald Grund
- Grindelwald

=== Timetables ===
A regular interval timetable is operated between Grindelwald and Kleine Scheidegg with trains running every half-hour morning and afternoon, except between late October and mid December when the service is hourly. Journey time is 33 minutes up and 39 minutes down.

Between Lauterbrunnen and Wengen, trains run all year every half-hour until early evening, followed by an hourly service. During mornings and afternoons they continue to Kleine Scheidegg, again half-hourly except between late October and mid December when the service is hourly. Journey time is 43 minutes up and 50 minutes down.

Before December 2011, the Lauterbrunnen - Wengen - Kleine Scheidegg service was formed of 5 trains running at irregular intervals in every 2-hour period. Journey times varied between 44 and 51 minutes up and 54 and 60 minutes down. Following the construction of the new loop between Wengen and Allmend, the number of trains in each direction has been reduced from 5 to 4 in each 2-hour period, but departure and journey times have been standardised.

Between December and March, extra trains are run on some evenings between Grindelwald and Alpiglen to carry passengers to the floodlit Eiger Run sledging course.

== Rolling stock ==
=== Locomotives ===
No.	Class	Builders	Date Completed	Image
31	He 2/2	Stadler/SLM/BBC	1995	
32	He 2/2	Stadler/SLM/BBC	1995	
51	He 2/2	SLM/Alioth	1909	
52	He 2/2	SLM/Alioth	1909	
53	He 2/2	SLM/Alioth	1909	
54	He 2/2	SLM/Alioth	1909	
64	He 2/2	SLM/BBC	1926	
65	He 2/2	SLM/MFO	1929	

=== Railcars ===
The earliest railcars still in service, numbers 101 and 102 ( BDhe 4/4, built by SLM/BBC ) date from 1947, No.102 being refurbished 1985. Of the other 14 cars of this class, No's. 104 and 106–118, built between 1954 and 1964, which still survive, ten have been refurbished (all except 104 / 7 / 9 / 10) since 2000. No. 114 was refurbished along with 102 in 1985 but was returned to works in 2002 to be brought up to the newer specifications.

In 1970 a new class of railcar ( BDhe 4/4 ) was introduced, numbered 119 to 124, built by a consortium of SIG, SLM, SAAS and BBC. These were refurbished in 1998. Four further cars, class BDhe 4/8, numbered 131 to 134, and built by SLM ( Works Nos. 5363–66 inclusive ) with electrical equipment by BBC, arrived in 1988 with the latest additions, a series of four "Panorama" cars of Class Bhe 4/8, built by Stadler arriving in 2004.

=== Driving trailer cars ===
The earliest coaches still listed to the company are three dating from 1893 and a single example from 1901. These have all been rebuilt twice, the final one in 1995 by the von Roll company. Later examples date from the period 1959 to 2003, some of the earlier of these have rebuilt. Building of the stock has been carried out by SIG, with electrical equipment by Brown Boveri / Asea Brown Boveri and later by Stadler with electrical equipment by Steck, (except No. 231 which was built by SLM with electrical equipment by ABB).

The line also operates with an extensive collection of goods stock, in the main used for services between Lauterbrunnen and Wengen.

== See also ==
- List of mountain railways in Switzerland
- Rail transport in Switzerland
- Jungfraubahn
