= Wengen =

- Former municipality
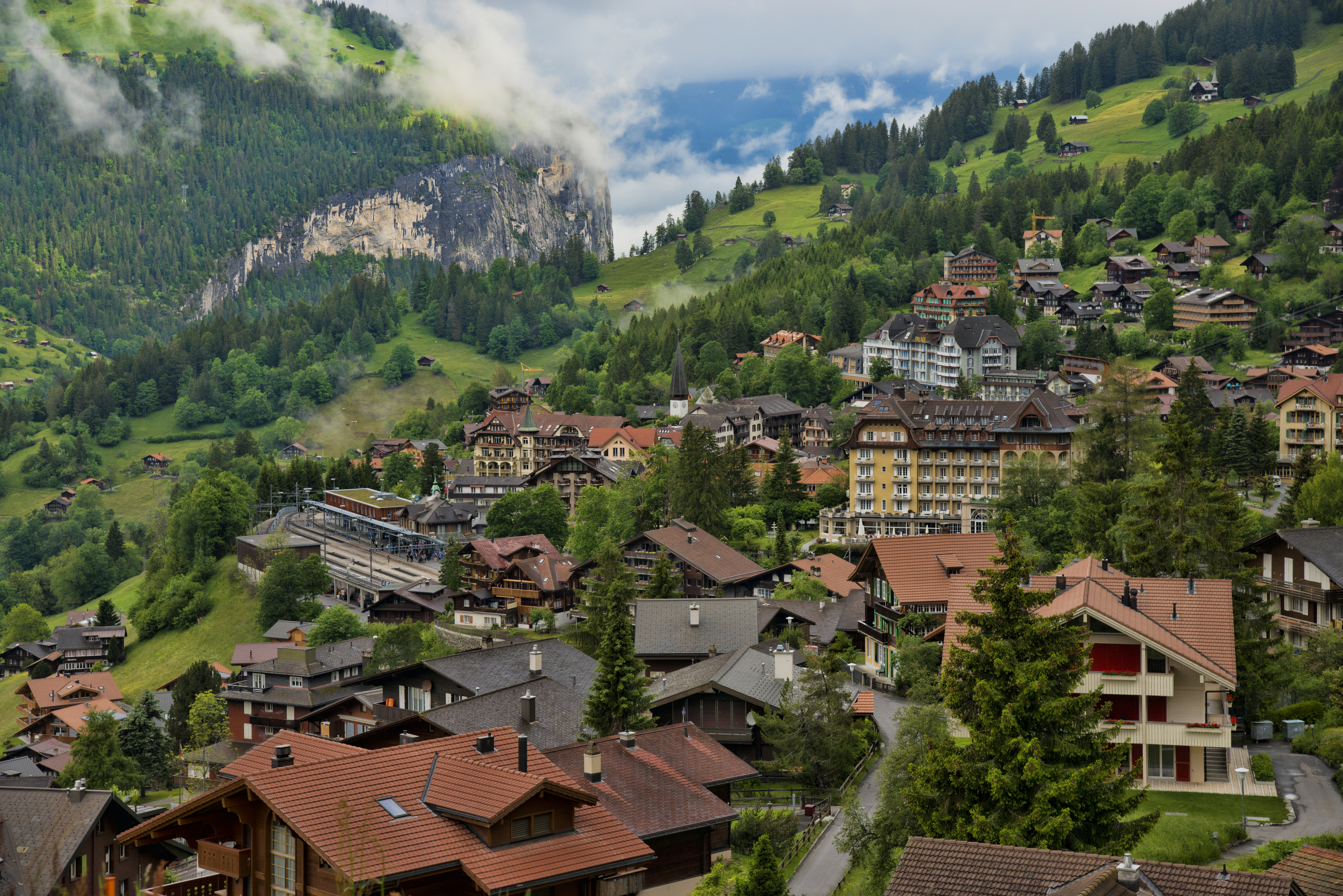
- Wengen in June 2012

- Coat of arms
- Location of Wengen
- Location within Switzerland Location within Canton of Bern
- Coordinates: 46°36′20″N 7°55′17″E
- Country: Switzerland
- Canton: Bern
- District: Interlaken-Oberhasli
- Municipality: Lauterbrunnen

Area
  - Total: 36.4 km^{2} (14.1 sq mi)
- Elevation: 1,274 m (4,180 ft)

Population (December 2025)
  - Total: 1,140
  - Density: 31.3/km^{2} (81.1/sq mi)
- Time zone: UTC+01:00 (CET)
  - Summer (DST): UTC+02:00 (CEST)
- Postal code: 3823
- ISO 3166 code: CH-BE
- Website

Location in the Alps

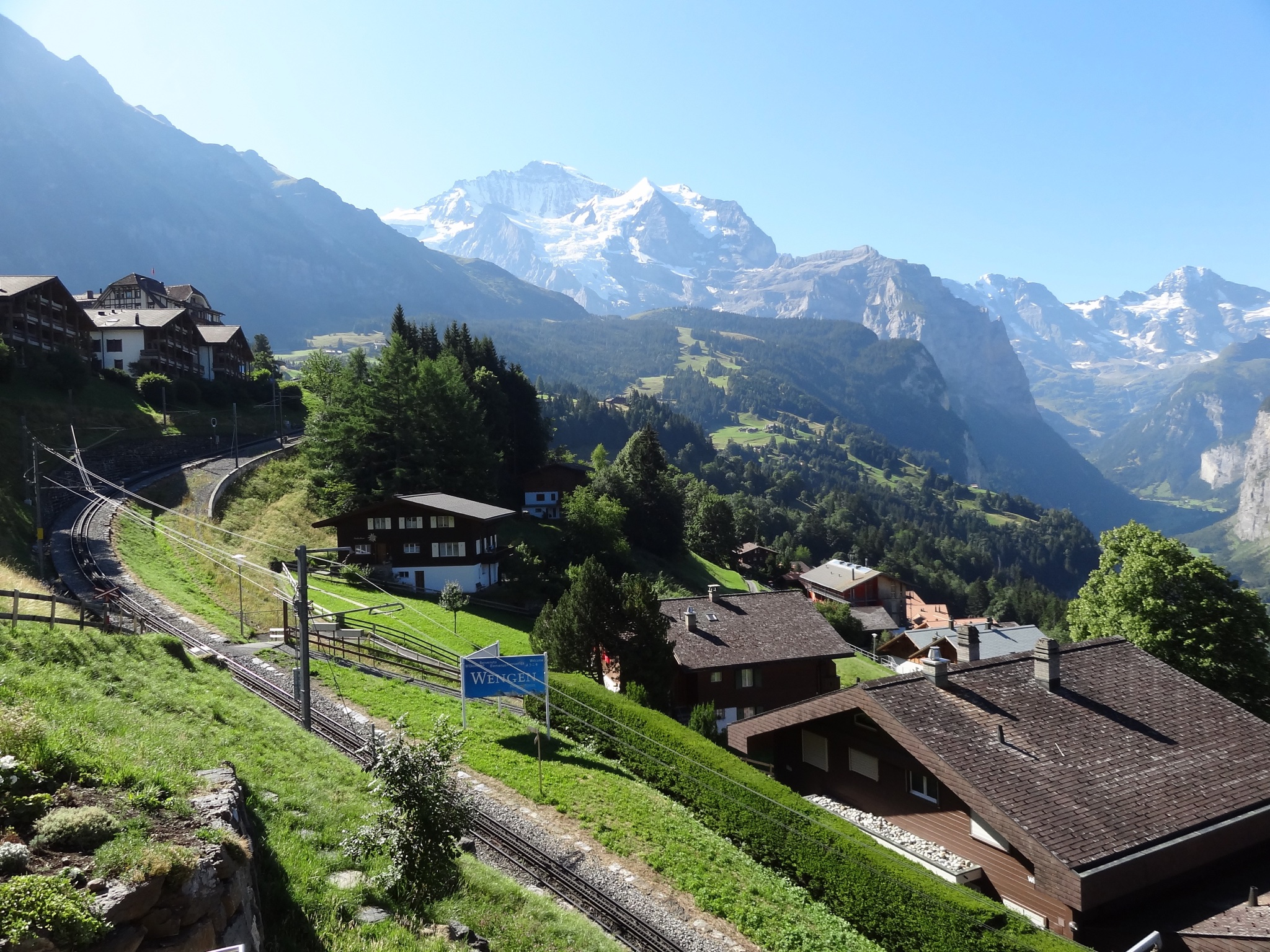
The Wengernalpbahn leading into the town. The Jungfrau is visible in the background.

Wengen (German pronunciation: [ˈvɛŋən]) is a mountain village in the Bernese Oberland of central Switzerland. Located in the canton of Bern at an elevation of 1,274 m (4,180 ft) above sea level, it is part of the Jungfrau Region and has approximately 1,150 year-round residents, which swells to 5,000 during summer and to 10,000 in the winter. Wengen hosts the classic Lauberhorn ski races of the FIS Alpine Ski World Cup in January.

== History ==
Wengen was first mentioned in official documents in 1268, and the origin of the name is unknown.

Primarily an alpine farming community, the village began to be visited by tourists in the early 19th century. Mary and Percy Bysshe Shelley's History of a Six Weeks' Tour and Byron's Manfred, in which the scenery of the area is described, were published in 1817. This literature became the advent of the modern tourism industry for the village. Felix Mendelssohn, to whom there is a memorial above the village, also visited in the early nineteenth century.

Guesthouses and hotels began to be built in the mid-19th century, with the opening of the Launerhaus in 1859, with accommodation for 30 guests, and in 1880 the Pension Wengen was available to 100 guests. The building and opening of the Wengernalpbahn in the 1890s made the village more accessible to tourists who previously had to walk up the steep slopes to the alpine village, opening the area for an expansion of tourism and the beginning of the ski industry.

In the early 20th century, British tourists started ski-clubs in the area, beginning in the nearby village of Mürren. By 1903 Wengen had an Anglican church and two years later, Sir Henry Lunn formed the Public Schools Alpine Sports Club with Wengen as a destination ski area for the members. A British Methodist minister, Lunn first visited the area to organize a meeting of Protestant churches in nearby Grindelwald where he learned about winter sports such as skiing. He returned to the area in 1896 with his son Arnold, who quickly learned to ski, and both father and son realized the potential in the future of winter sports. The club was established a few years later. Members of the Public Schools Alpine Sports Club were required to have attended an English public school or one of the "older universities". Wengen's Curling Club was established in 1911.

The first ski races were held in the early 1920s with the British downhill championship held in 1921; the following year a ski race was held between Oxford and Cambridge. These events were the first to have downhill races as opposed to Nordic races, which were held in other Swiss resorts. In Wengen, skiers requested use of the train system for access to the slopes; for some years trains were the earliest ski-lifts in the area. Arnold Lunn used the natural terrain of the mountains for the courses; the downhill event followed the slopes above Wengen and was called the "straight down": skiers went straight down the mountain. Also during this period, Lunn invented, and introduced in Wengen, the first slalom race, in which skiers followed the terrain through the trees, replaced with ski gates in later years. These events are considered the birth of modern ski racing and Alpine skiing.

From August 1944 to the end of World War II, Wengen served as a sort of open-air internment camp for allied prisoners, mostly US bomber crews. Since the only practical way in or out of Wengen was via the cog railway, it was difficult for internees to escape.

== Churches ==
Wengen has three churches: Anglican, Swiss and Roman Catholic.

The Swiss church was rebuilt in the 1950s and overlooks the Lauterbrunnen Valley.

English churches were established during the 19th century in nearby Grindelwald, Meiringen, and Mürren. By 1912, Anglican services took place in Wengen's 19th-century church twice on Sundays. Desiring their own building, the Continental & Colonial Church Society erected a new English church, which was consecrated on 15 January 1928 by the Bishop of Fulham. The building is on the road formerly leading to the Mannlichen cable car lift. The new cable car station is, however, nearer to the centre of Wengen. St Bernard's has been used for over 90 years for Sunday services and occasional offices, such as the memorial in 1949 for Anthony Carrick, a schoolboy who died in the mountains. The congregation in 1954 was described as consisting 'of people from many parts of the British Commonwealth and America as well as English-speaking Continentals'. The congregation continues to be diverse.

The Roman Catholic church stands adjacent to the Falken Hotel and has a distinctive onion dome. Mass is celebrated on most Sundays in season.

== Politics ==
Together with villages of Mürren, Isenfluh, Gimmelwald, Stechelberg and Lauterbrunnen, Wengen forms the political commune of Lauterbrunnen.

== Transport ==
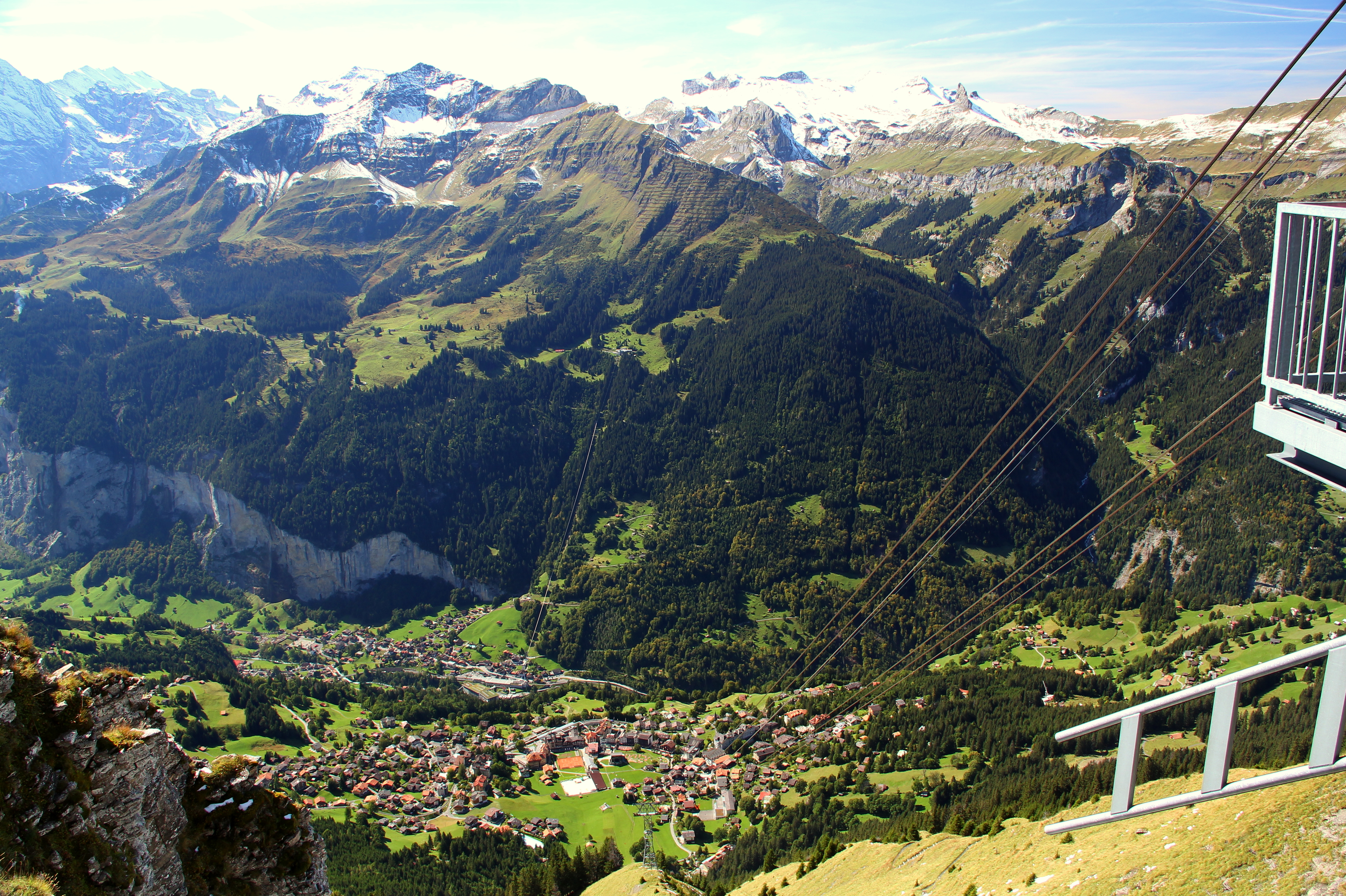
View from Männlichen of Wengen, the Lauterbrunnen Valley and the Mürren Cableway on the opposite side of the valley.

There are generally no roads to Wengen/Mürren. It is one of very few car-free resort villages in Europe, although there are a few service vehicles, local farm vehicles, electric vehicles for taxiing to and from the railway station. This creates a tranquil atmosphere throughout the village and reduces traffic noise. For ecological reasons other resorts are considering following the car-free example. Across the Lauterbrunnen valley, Mürren, too, is largely car free.

Wengen is serviced by the rack railway system Wengernalpbahn (WAB), and the village is accessible directly from Lauterbrunnen or by train from Grindelwald via Kleine Scheidegg, as well as by a series of gondola lifts from Grindelwald via Männlichen. In Kleine Scheidegg, the mountain pass at the foot of the Eiger, Mönch and Jungfrau, passengers must disembark and change trains to travel down to Grindelwald and Grund. The rail service from Lauterbrunnen to Wengen railway station runs daily from early in the morning until very late at night and is the most intensively operated section of the Wengernalpbahn. There are approximately 40 services between Lauterbrunnen to Wengen every day. Each service may consist of up to 4 separate trains, running closely behind one amother because during busy periods, the scheduled train can be followed by additional trains as necessary, optimizing capacity.

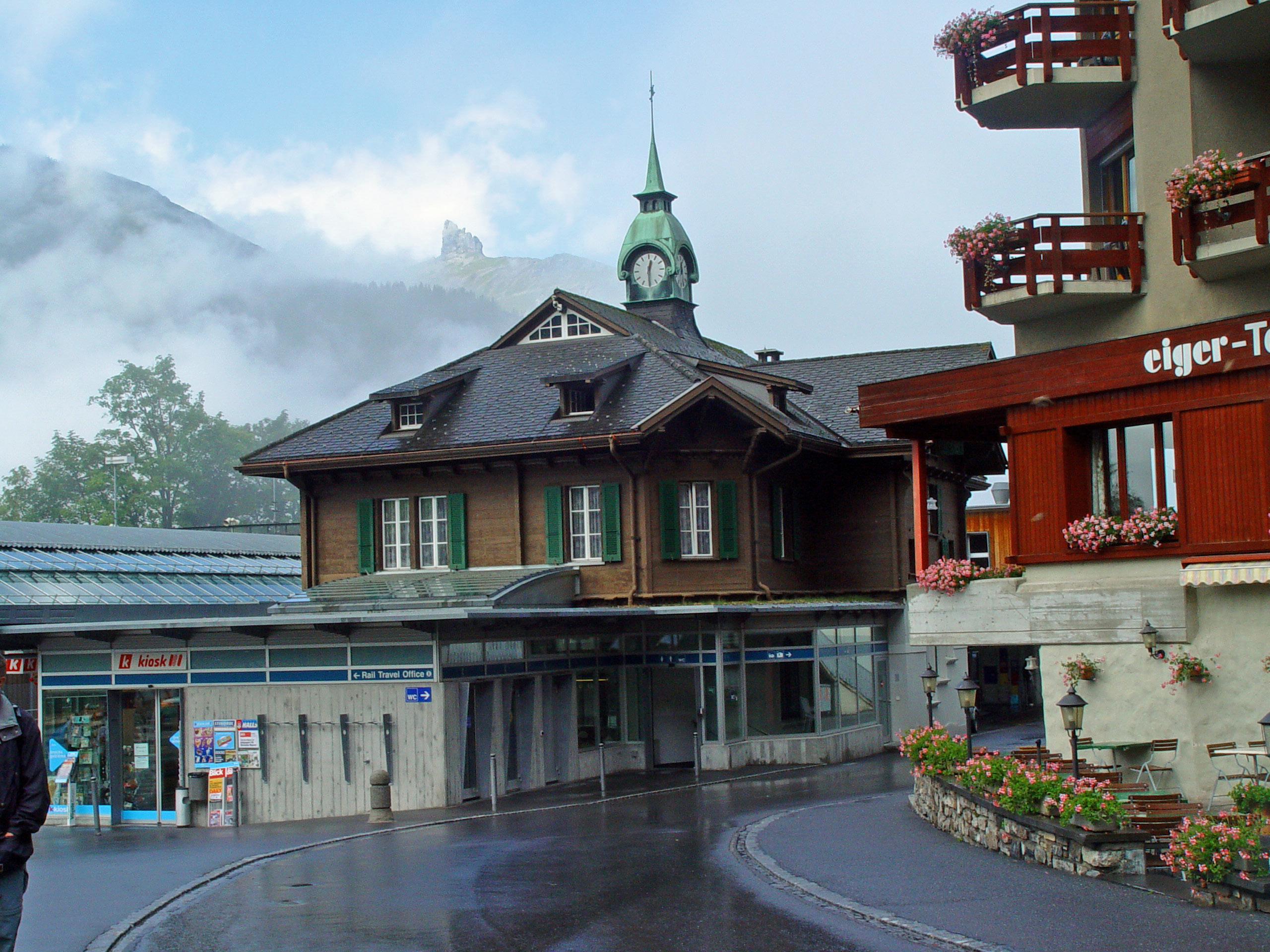
Wengen railway station

The uphill journey takes around 14 minutes, and the downhill journey takes 17 minutes. The downhill services take longer because they arrive at the midpoint passing place below Wengwald slightly earlier than the uphill services to allow the uphill services to pass them and proceed to Wengen without stopping. All trains now use the less steep but slightly longer route via Wengwald. The old route ran across the footpath to Wengen. It was used for freight transport after the new route was created but has since been abandoned. All freight is delivered by rail from Lauterbrunnen into a depot underneath the passenger railway station, and refuse is returned from the village also by rail. Every day one or two, goods trains goes from Lauterbrunnen to Wengen and back carrying large items such as furniture.

The cable car Luftseilbahn Wengen-Männlichen operates seasonally. The view from the tram and from Männlichen above, affords clear vistas of Wengen and much of Lauterbrunnen Valley and small villages.

== Recreation ==
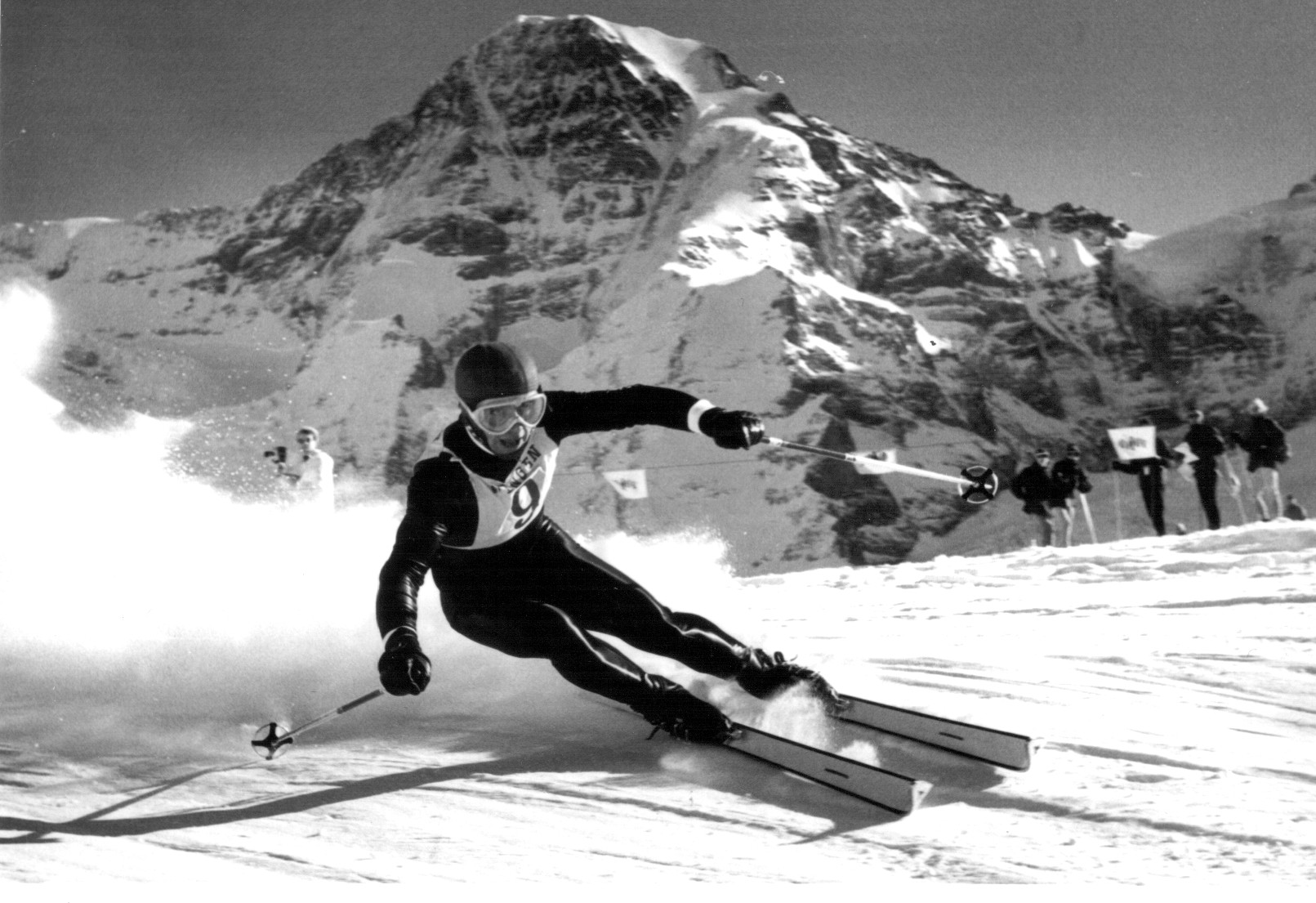
Karl Schranz winning in 1966

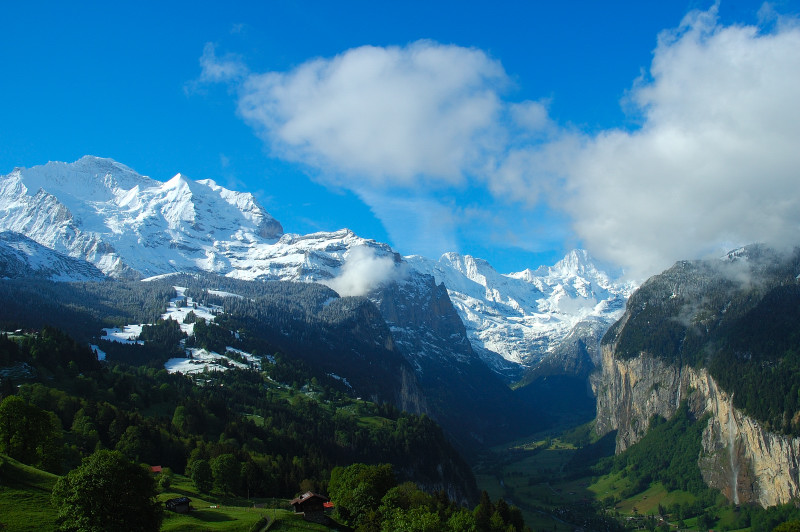
View from Wengen of Jungfrau and Lauterbrunnental

Wengen hosts the internationally well-known Lauberhorn ski races, and it is on the route of the Jungfrau Marathon.

The classic ski races have been held in Wengen since 1930, and traditionally consist of a downhill, a slalom, and a combined event. In addition to being one of the technically most challenging downhill races, the Lauberhorn is the longest race in the FIS World Cup circuit and arguably the most scenic. The top racers complete the 4.455 km (2.77 mi) run in about 2½ minutes and the top speeds reached at Haneggschuss are the highest on the circuit, approaching 160 km/h (100 mph) a half-minute prior to the finish.

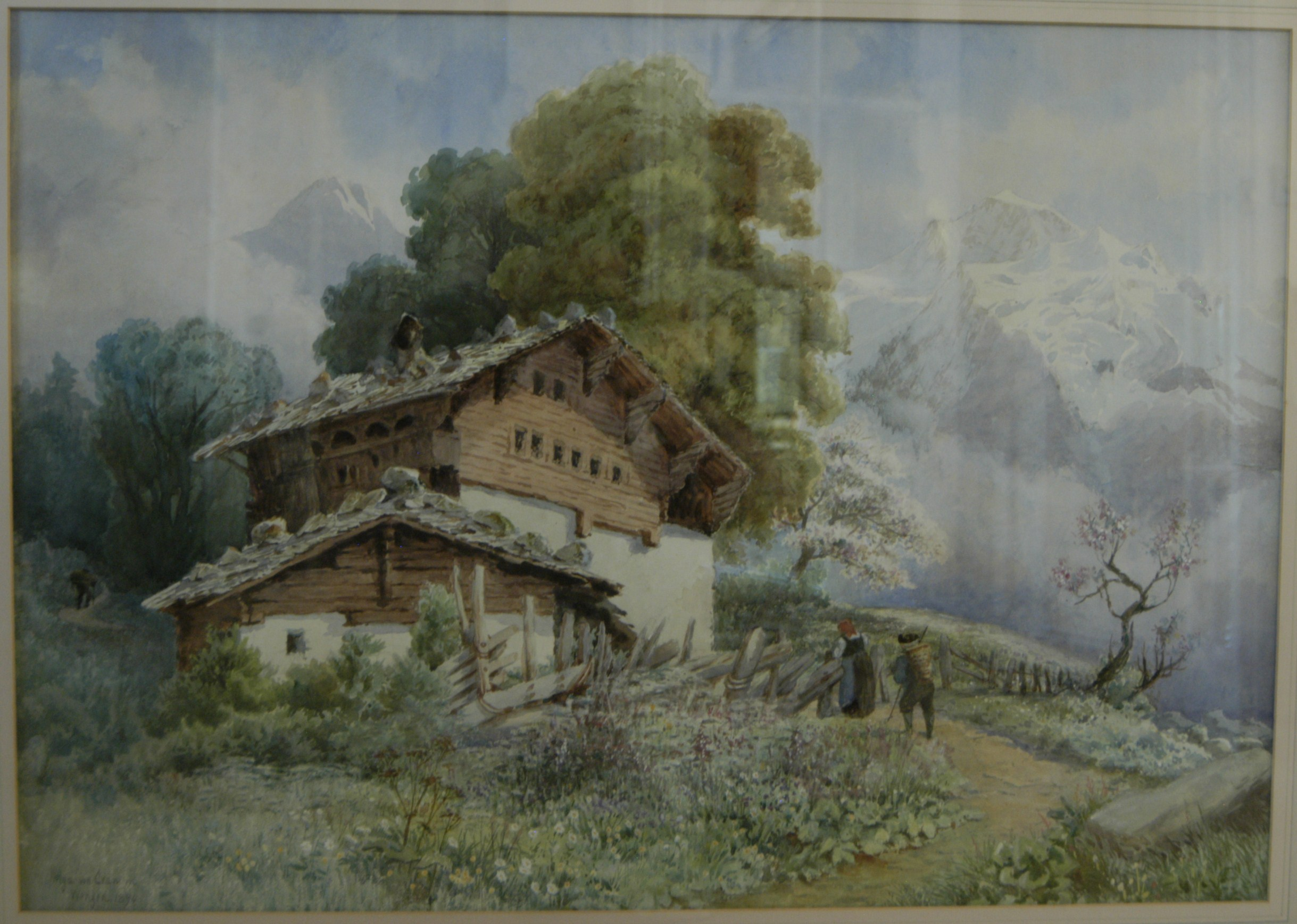
A watercolour (dated 1894) by Helga von Cramm (1840-c. 1920)

== Culture ==
A special cultural feature of Wengen is the so-called "Pfeifende Lurch" (German for "whistling amphibian"). It is a legendary creature from myths and tales that exist only in Wengen.

== Sources ==
- Allen, John B. (1996). From Skisport to Skiing. University of Massachusetts Press. ISBN 978-0-19-530955-3.
- Beattie, Andrew (2006). The Alps: A Cultural History. Oxford University Press. ISBN 978-0-19-530955-3.
- Hudson, Simon (2000). Snow Business: A Study of the International Ski Industry. Cengage Learning EMEA. ISBN 978-0-304-70471-2.
