= Kleine Scheidegg =

Mountain pass in Switzerland

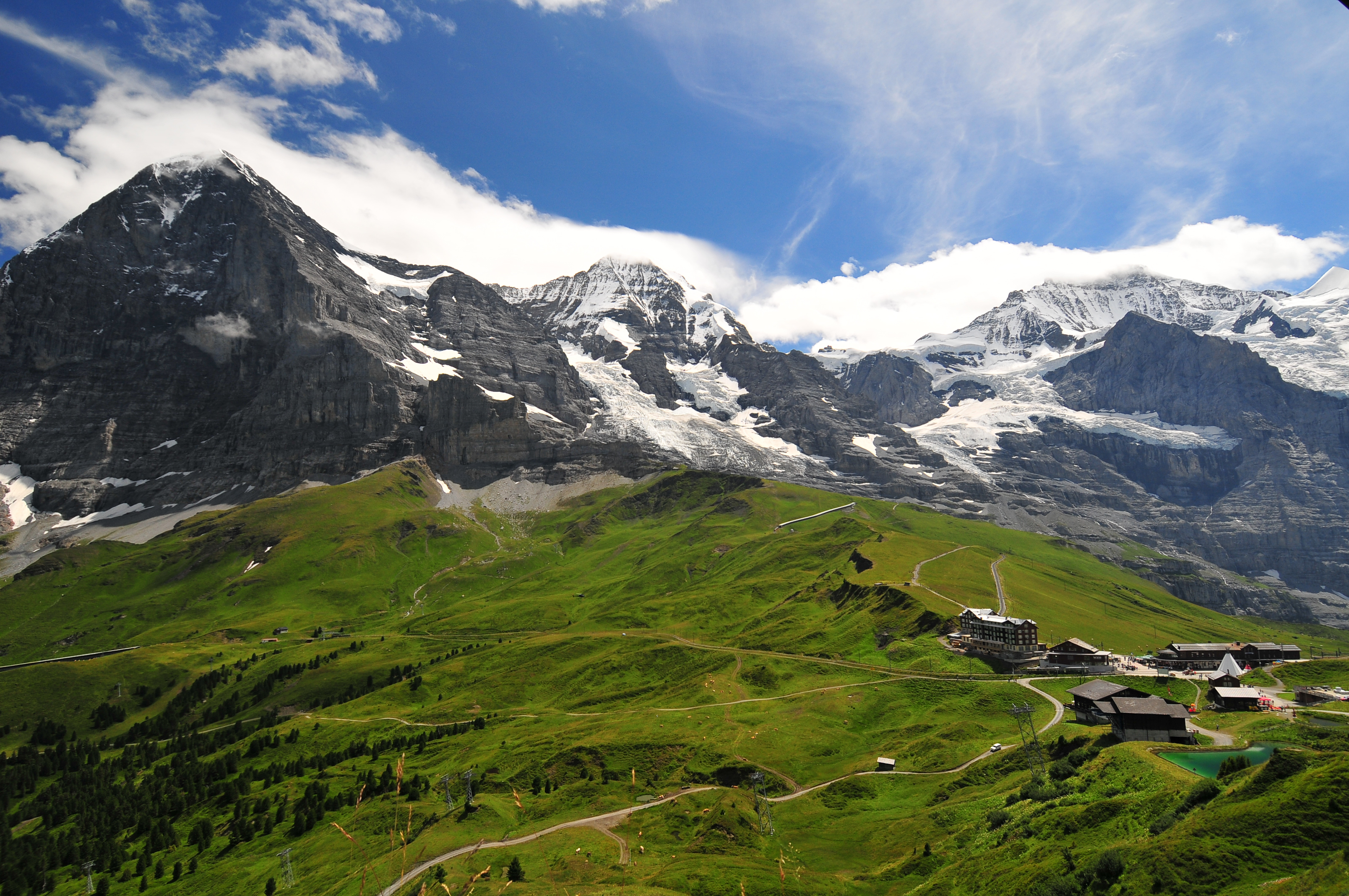
- Kleine Scheidegg (right) overlooked by the Eiger, Mönch and Jungfrau

- Location within Switzerland
- Elevation: 2,061 m (6,762 ft)
- Traversed by: Rail

Location
- Location: Canton of Bern, Switzerland
- Range: Bernese Alps
- Coordinates: 46°35′06″N 7°57′40″E

The Kleine Scheidegg (Swiss Standard German pronunciation: [ˈklaɪnə ˈʃaɪdɛg]; English: Little Scheidegg) is a mountain pass at an elevation of 2,061 m (6,762 ft), situated below and between the Eiger and Lauberhorn peaks in the Bernese Oberland region of Switzerland. The name means "minor watershed", as it only divides the two arms of the Lütschine river, both converging at Zweilütschinen, while the nearby Grosse Scheidegg divides the Lütschine from the Rychenbach stream.

The pass is traversed by a walking trail and the Wengernalp Railway, which both connect the villages of Grindelwald with Lauterbrunnen, passing through Wengen between the pass summit and Lauterbrunnen. In winter, Kleine Scheidegg is the centre of the ski area around Grindelwald and Wengen. In summer, it is a popular hiking destination, and is one of the passes crossed by the Alpine Pass Route between Sargans and Montreux. The Jungfrau Marathon, a mountain race that takes place every year in early September, ends at Kleine Scheidegg.

The Kleine Scheidegg railway station is sited at the summit of the pass. Besides being an intermediate stop on the Wengernalp Railway, the station is also the lower terminus of the Jungfrau Railway, which climbs steeply through tunnels inside the Eiger and Mönch mountains up to its terminal at the Jungfraujoch, the highest point reachable by rail in Europe. Both railways operate year-round, and any passengers travelling to the Jungfraujoch must change trains at Kleine Scheidegg. The pass is linked to the summit of the Lauberhorn and to Arvengarten, on the approach to the pass from Grindelwald, by chairlifts.

There are also several restaurants and hotels at the summit of the pass, including the historic Hotel Bellevue des Alpes that dates back to 1840.

== History ==
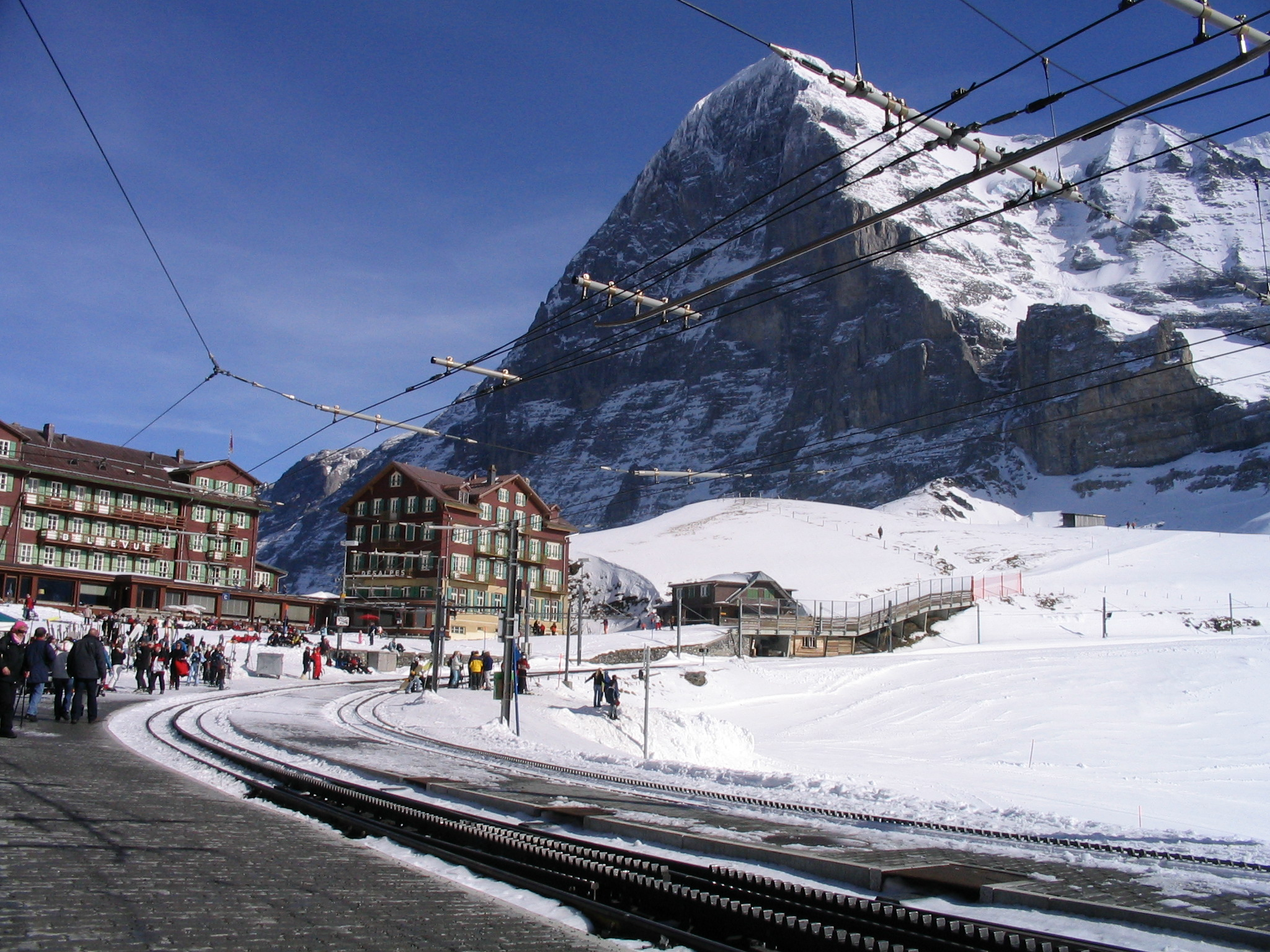
Hotel Bellevue des Alpes and the Eiger from Kleine Scheidegg railway station

Prior to the coming of the railways and the introduction of tourism to the area, the twin passes of Kleine Scheidegg and Grosse Scheidegg provided access for local livestock and dairy farmers to the important export route to Italy over the Grimsel Pass. With the coming of tourism and the opening of the first mountain hotels in the 1830s, the transit of the Kleine Scheidegg became busier, and more important than the Grosse Scheidegg.

In 1840, Christian Seiler built the inn Zur Gemse on the summit of the pass. Guests and supplies reached the inn by mule train over the pass tracks, and the inn grew into the internationally famous Hotel Bellevue. The Wengernalp co-operative opened the competing Hotel des Alps alongside the Hotel Bellevue, but sold out to the Seiler family, thus creating the merged Hotel Bellevue des Alps.

In order to satisfy tourist demand, construction of the Wengernalp Railway across the pass commenced in 1891, and the line opened in 1893, as a steam hauled summer only service. The line was electrified in 1909/10, and year-round operation started in 1925 (to Lauterbrunnen) and 1960 (to Grindelwald). Construction of the Jungfrau Railway started in 1896, and it opened in stages from 1898 to 1912. Since the 1930s, Kleine Scheidegg has been the base of expeditions on the north face of the Eiger.

== Geography ==
Kleine Scheidegg is among the most celebrated mountain passes in the Swiss Alps because of its position just north of the point where the Bernese Alps makes a salient angle, whose apex is the Eiger. From there, a series of high peaks rise in line towards the northeast, on the left side of the trail that follows a direct route from Meiringen, southwest across the Grosse Scheidegg, to Kleine Scheidegg. On the south side of the apex at the Eiger, the still higher summits of the Mönch, Jungfrau, Gletscherhorn, and Mittaghorn follow in succession from north to south.

Hidden by the Eiger from the vantage point of Grindelwald, the Mönch and Jungfrau break upon the traveller at Kleine Scheidegg in full grandeur, rising from the narrow gorge of the Trümmletental. Three comparatively large glaciers, with several minor accumulations of ice, are found in the hollows and on the shelving ledges of the three peaks that rise above the Trümmletental. The Eiger Glacier lies in the recess between the Eiger and the Mönch. This is separated by a huge projecting buttress of the latter mountain from the Guggi Glacier. Farther on is the Giessen Glacier, formed, at a higher level than the two last, on a shelf of the northwest side of the Jungfrau.

Politically, the pass at Kleine Scheidegg marks the boundary between the municipalities of Lauterbrunnen and Grindelwald, both of which are within the canton of Bern.

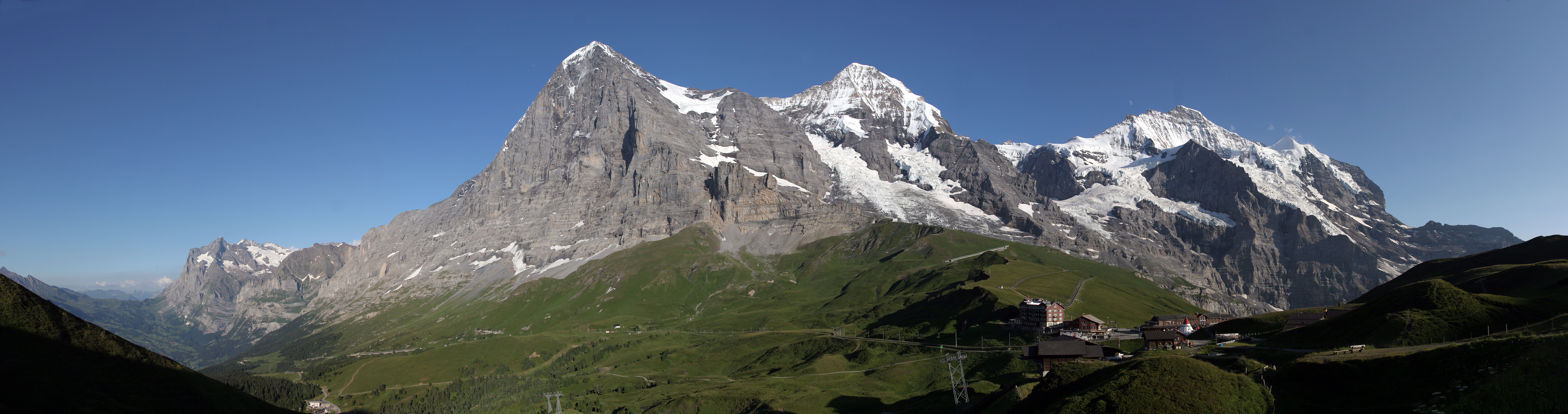
Kleine Scheideg, with the Eiger, Mönch, and Jungfrau peaks behind, seen from the slopes of the Lauberhorn. Grindelwald lies in the valley to the left, and the Grosse Scheidegg can be seen beyond.

== In popular culture ==
The film Kleine Scheidegg (1937) was set on the eponymous pass, directed by Richard Schweizer, and starring Susanne Baader, Leopold Biberti and Emil Hegetschweiler.

In the summer of 1974, Clint Eastwood and his cast and crew stayed at the Hotel Bellevue des Alpes at Kleine Scheidegg while filming The Eiger Sanction (1975). Several scenes were filmed in and around the hotel.

The 2008 film North Face, about Toni Kurz and Andreas Hinterstoisser's 1936 attempt to climb the Eiger north face, was shot to a great extent at the Hotel Bellevue des Alpes. Footage of the mountain's profile was also shot from Kleine Scheidegg's vantage point, though the climbing scenes were created mostly using computer generated imagery and green screen technology.

The hiking track in the area is the basis for the fictional Eiger Nordwand tracks in the racing video games Gran Turismo HD Concept, Gran Turismo 5 Prologue, Gran Turismo 5, and Gran Turismo 6 and Gran Turismo 7.

== See also ==
- List of mountain passes in Switzerland
