= Hollandia Hut =

Coordinates: 46°28′31″N 7°57′37″E

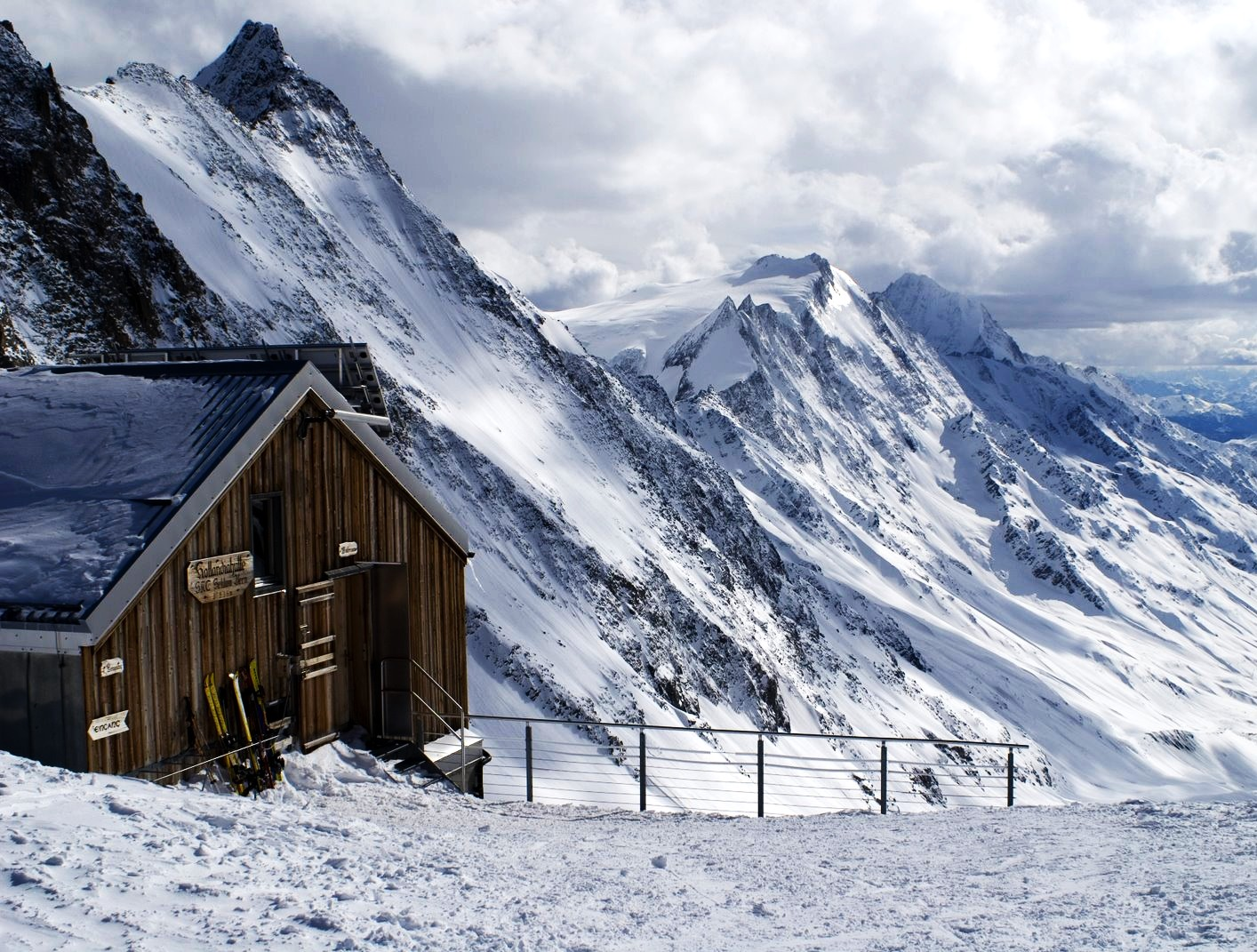
The Hollandia Hut with the Lötschental in background

The Hollandia Hut (German: Hollandiahütte) is a mountain hut of the Swiss Alpine Club, located east of Blatten in the canton of Valais. The hut lies at a height of 3,240 metres above sea level, just above the Lötschenlücke, the glacier pass connecting the Lötschental from the Aletsch Glacier. All accesses to the hut involve glacier crossing.

The Hollandia Hut is a starting point for the ascents of the Ebnefluh, Mittaghorn, Aletschhorn, Sattelhorn, Gletscherhorn and Anungrat.

== See also ==
- List of buildings and structures above 3000 m in Switzerland
