= Baltschieder Hut =

Coordinates: 46°23′42″N 7°53′23″E

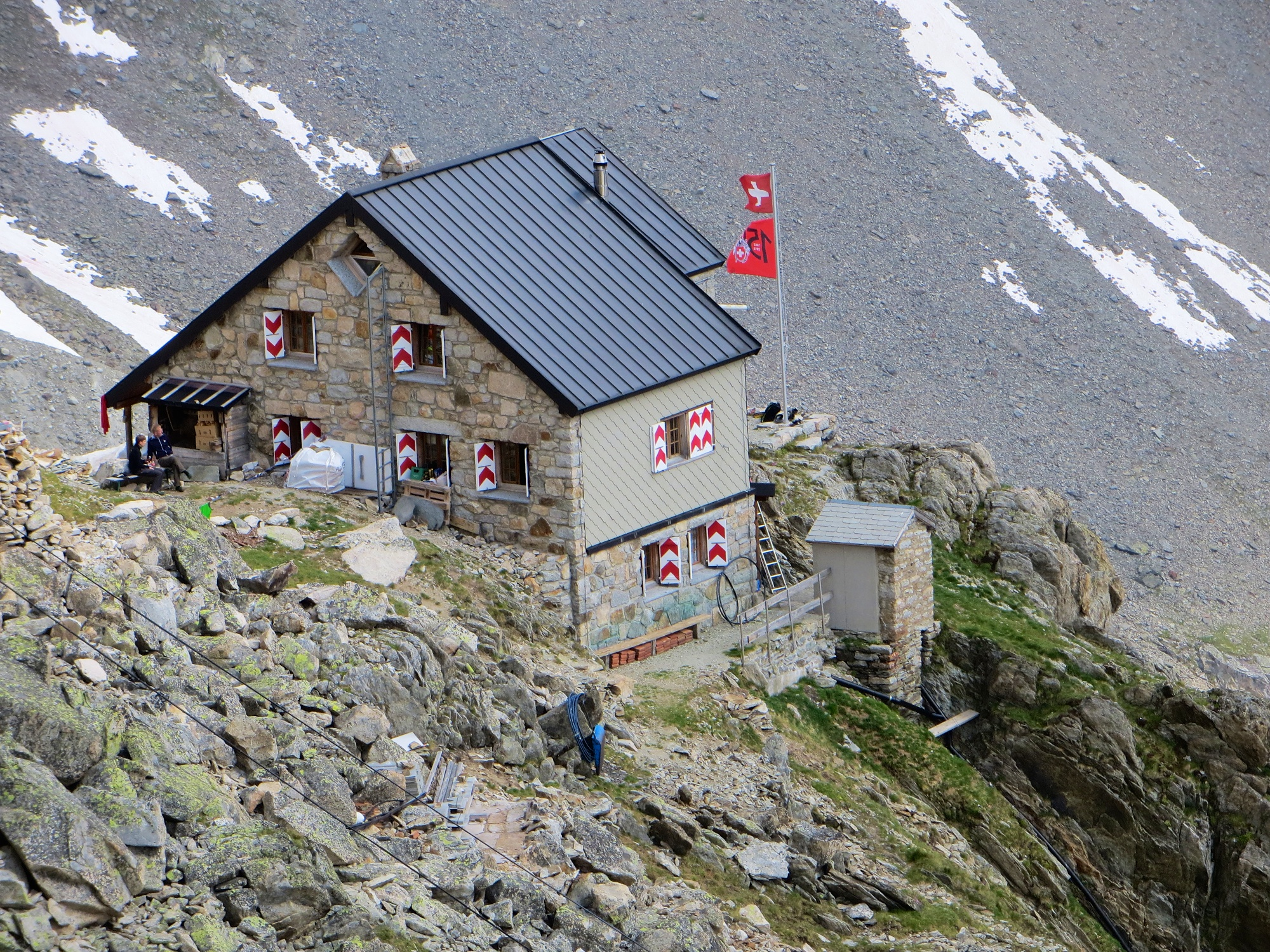
The Baltschieder Hut

The Baltschieder Hut (German: Baltschiederklause) is a mountain hut of the Swiss Alpine Club, located north of Baltschieder in the canton of Valais. It lies at a height of 2,783 metres above sea level, at the end of the Baltschiedertal near the Bietschhorn.

The Baltschieder Hut is used for the ascent of the Bietschhorn, the Jägihorn, the Nesthorn, the Breithorn (Blatten) and the Breitlauihorn.
