= Mittaghorn (disambiguation) =

The Mittaghorn is a 3,892-metre-high (12,769 ft) mountain in the Bernese Alps.

It may also refer to:

- Mittaghorn (Rawilpass), a mountain near the Rawil Pass
- Mittaghorn (SaasFee), a mountain in the Swiss Pennine Alps
- Rappehorn, a mountain in the Lepontine Alps
