= Lötschenlücke =

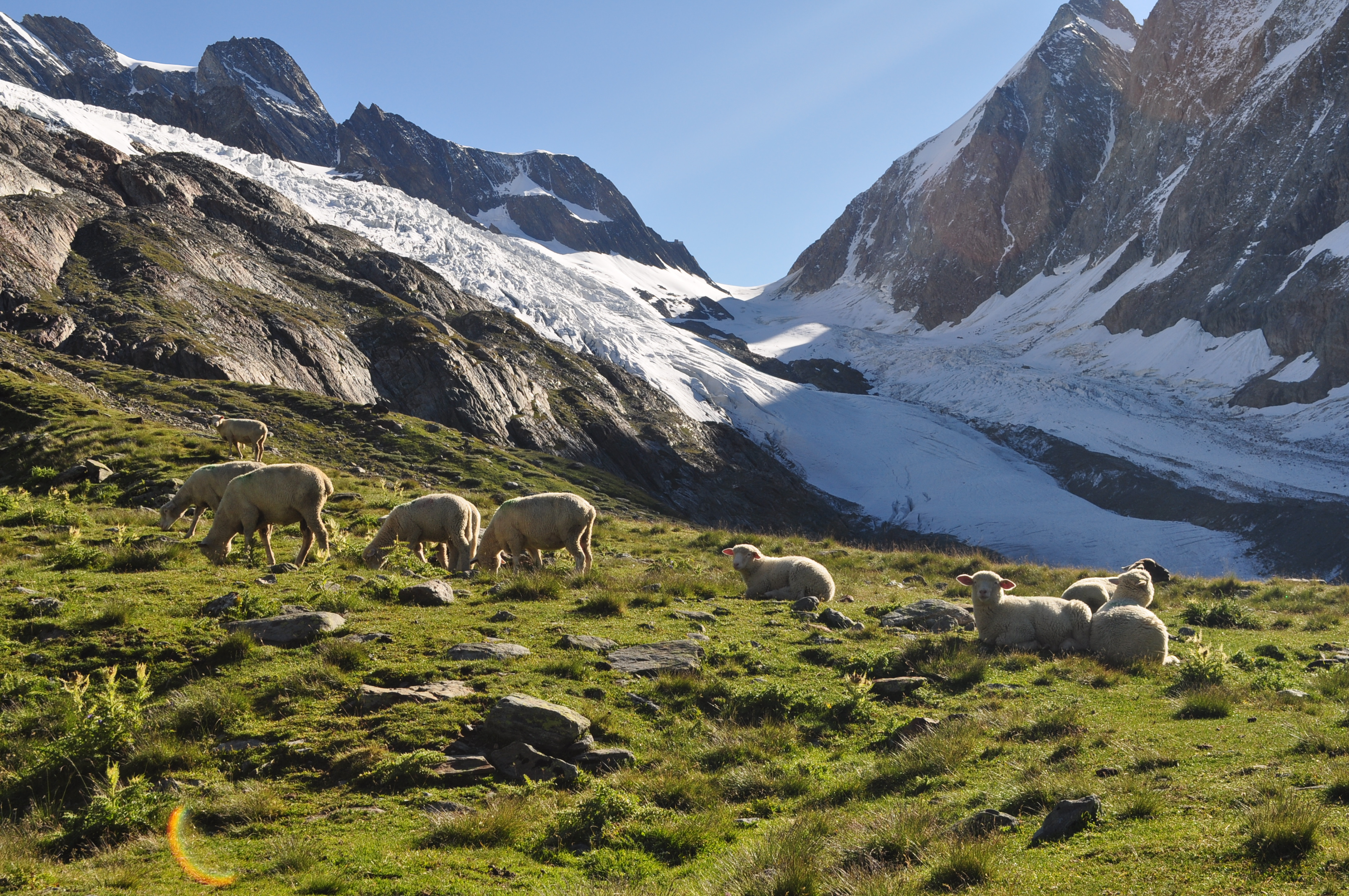
- View from the Lötschental (west side)

- Location within Switzerland
- Elevation: 3,153 metres (10,344 ft)
- Traversed by: Glacier

Third Approach
- Location: Valais, Switzerland
- Range: Bernese Alps
- Coordinates: 46°28′30″N 7°57′48″E

The Lötschenlücke (el. 3153 m.) is a high mountain pass of the Bernese Alps, connecting the Lötschental to the valley of the Aletsch Glacier in the canton of Valais. Both sides of the pass are covered by glaciers: the Langgletscher on the west and the Grosser Aletschfirn on the east. The Lötschenlücke lies between the Mittaghorn on the north and the Sattelhorn on the south.

The closest settlement is Fafleralp (east of Blatten) in the Lötschental. There are no settlements in the valley of the Aletsch Glacier. Above the pass, at 3,240 m, lies the Hollandia Hut of the Swiss Alpine Club.

== See also ==
- List of mountain passes in Switzerland
