= Lauterbrunnen =

Village and municipality in Switzerland

- Municipality
- Valley of Lauterbrunnen

- Flag Coat of arms
- Location of Lauterbrunnen
- Location within Switzerland Location within Canton of Bern
- Coordinates: 46°35′42″N 7°54′27″E
- Country: Switzerland
- Canton: Bern
- District: Interlaken-Oberhasli

Government
  - Executive: Gemeinderat with 9 members
  - Mayor: Gemeindepräsident(in); Karl Näpflin (as of 2026)

Area
  - Total: 164.4 km^{2} (63.5 sq mi)
- Elevation (Church): 802 m (2,631 ft)

Population (December 2020)
  - Total: 2,301
  - Density: 14.00/km^{2} (36.25/sq mi)
- Demonym: German: Lauterbrunner/in
- Time zone: UTC+01:00 (CET)
  - Summer (DST): UTC+02:00 (CEST)
- Postal code: 3822
- SFOS number: 584
- ISO 3166 code: CH-BE
- Localities: Lauterbrunnen, Wengen, Mürren, Gimmelwald, Stechelberg, Isenfluh, Soustal, Sefinental
- Surrounded by: Aeschi bei Spiez, Blatten (Lötschen) (VS), Fieschertal (VS), Grindelwald, Gündlischwand, Kandersteg, Lütschental, Reichenbach im Kandertal, Saxeten, Wilderswil
- Website: www.lauterbrunnen.ch

Lauterbrunnen (Swiss Standard German pronunciation: [ˈlaʊtərˌbrʊnən]) is a village and municipality in the Interlaken-Oberhasli administrative district in the canton of Bern in Switzerland. The municipality comprises the other villages of Wengen, Mürren, Gimmelwald, Stechelberg, and Isenfluh, as well as several other hamlets. The population of the village of Lauterbrunnen is less than that of Wengen, but larger than that of the others.

The municipality comprises the Lauterbrunnen Valley (German: Lauterbrunnental), located at the foot of the Bernese Alps. It is overlooked by the Eiger, Mönch, Jungfrau and many other high peaks. The valley, drained by the White Lütschine, comprises the Soustal, the Sefinental and the upper Lauterbrunnen Valley with Untersteinberg. The valley includes several glaciers. Together with the adjacent valley of Grindelwald, the Lauterbrunnen Valley forms part of the Jungfrau Region of the Bernese Oberland, between Interlaken and the main crest of the Bernese Alps.

Similarly to Grindelwald, Lauterbrunnen has become a major tourist destination. It is connected to Interlaken by the Bernese Oberland Railway and is the start of the Wengernalp Railway, leading to Kleine Scheidegg. The latter resort is the start of the Jungfrau Railway, the highest railway in Europe and a gateway to the Jungfrau-Aletsch protected area.

== Toponymy ==
Lauterbrunnen was first mentioned in 1240 as "in claro fonte", a Romance language place name meaning "clear spring". By 1253, it was known to German speakers as Liuterbrunnon; the town had an alternate spelling of Luterbrunnen by 1268. While the meaning of brunnen is undoubtedly spring or fountain, there is some dispute about the meaning of lauter. Some translate it as clear, clean or bright (which compares to the earlier Romance language meaning of the place mentioned above), while others translate it as "many" or "louder". A local explanation is that the name Lauterbrunnen means "many springs", using a modern meaning of the word lauter in German; however, this could be an example of a folk etymology.

== History ==
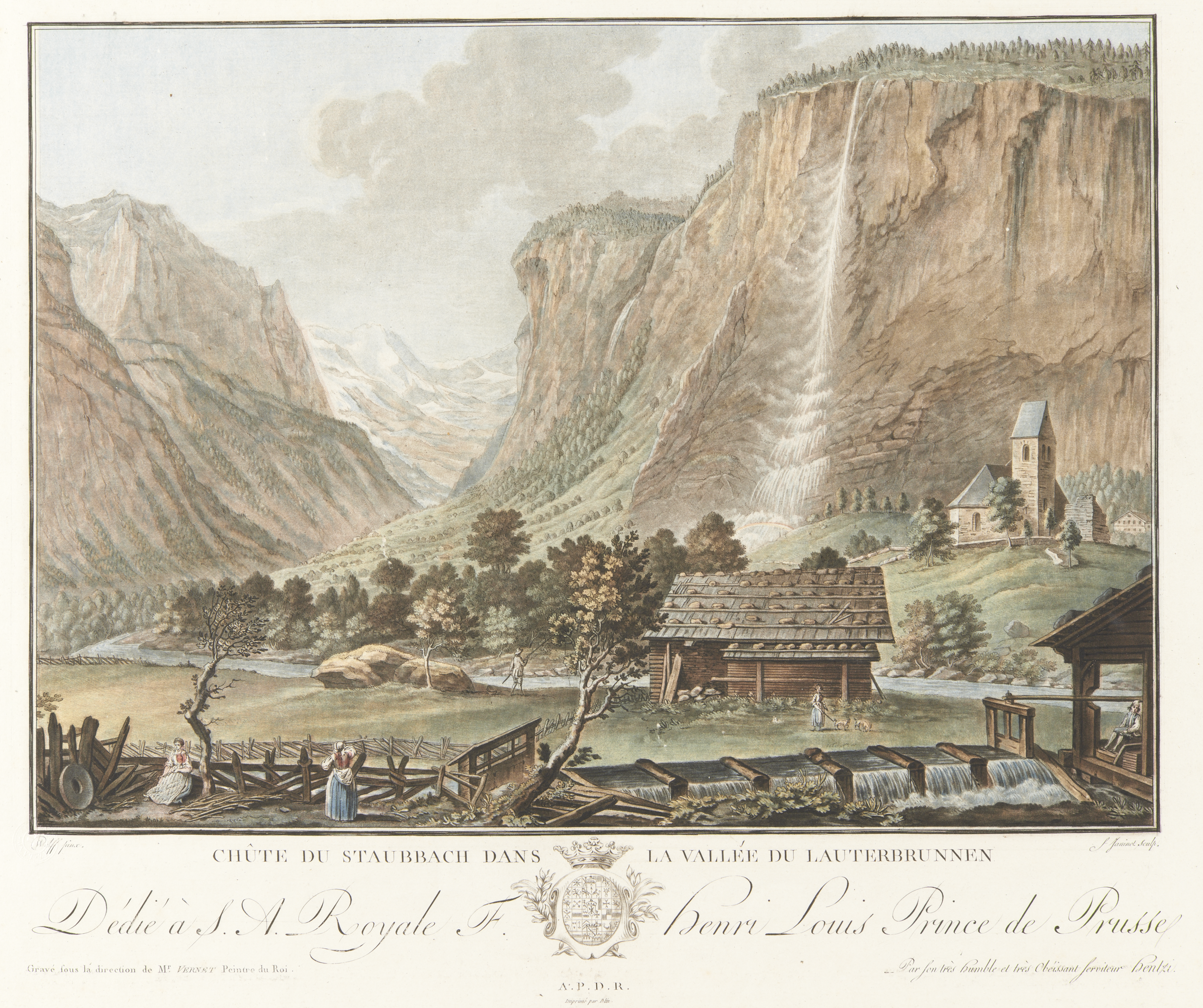
A depiction of Lauterbrunnen in the 18th century.

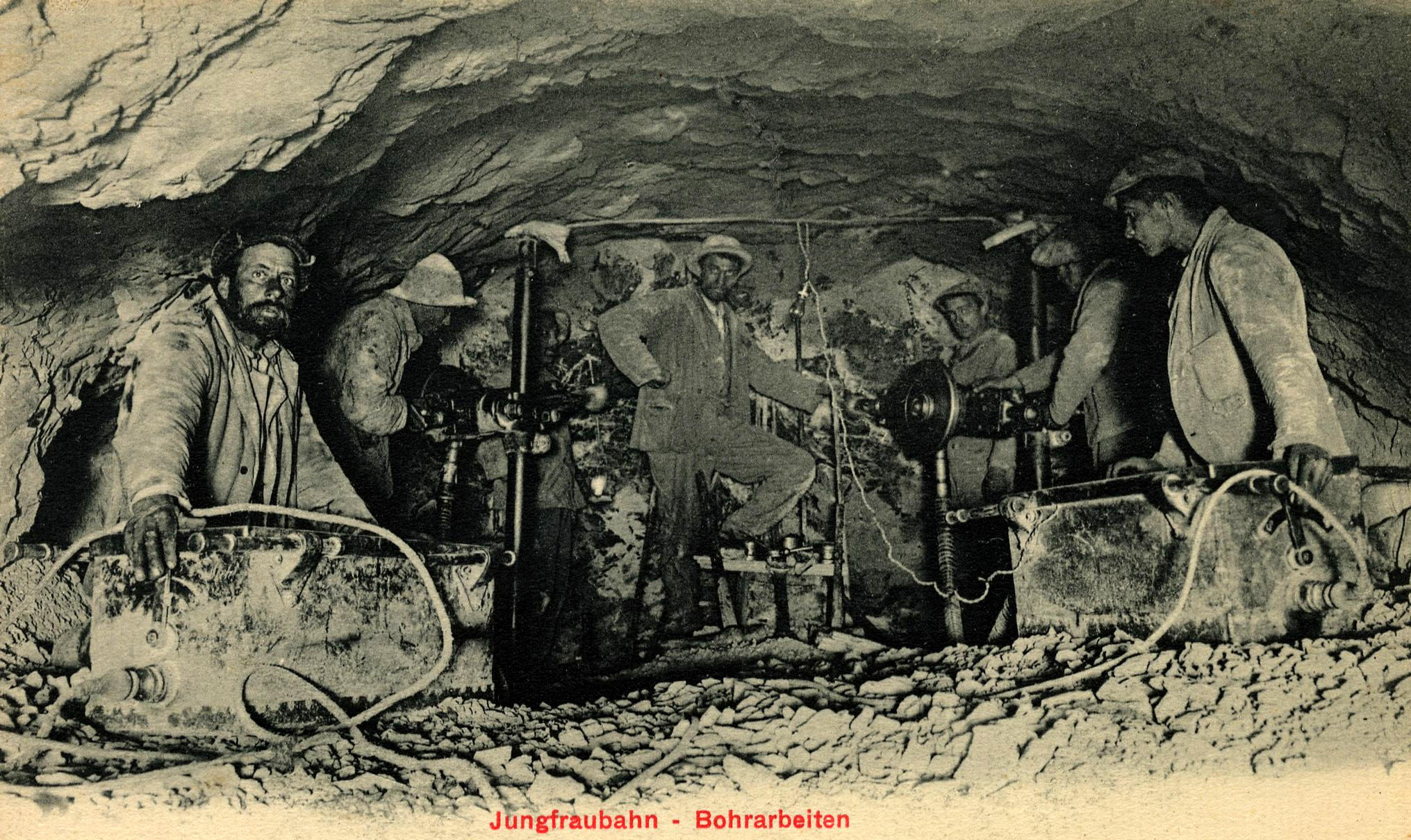
Miners working on the Jungfraubahn

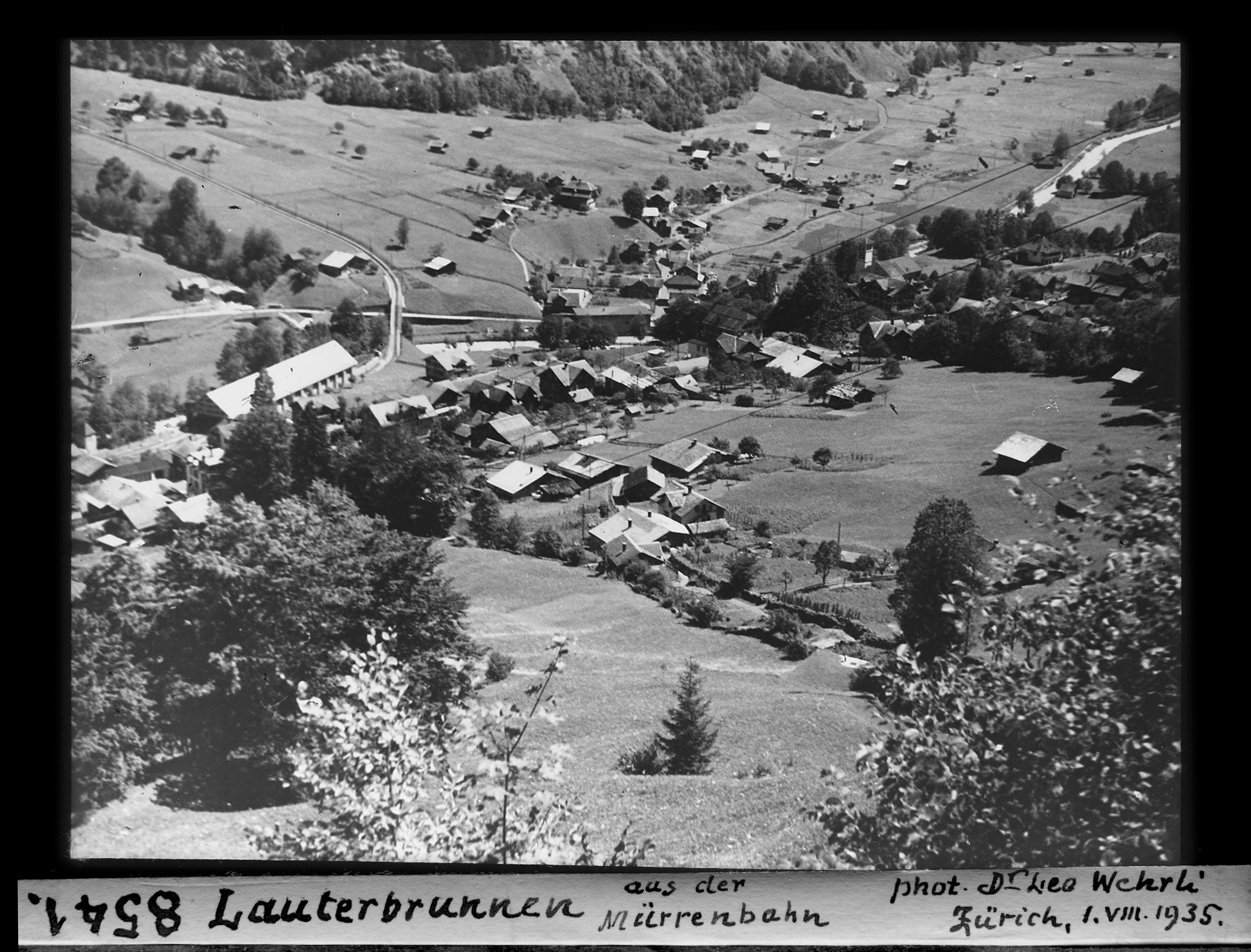
Lauterbrunnen, view from the Murrenbahn, by Leo Wehrli (1935)

The oldest trace of a settlement in the area is a single Roman coin which was discovered in the Blumental.

When the Lauterbrunnen Valley first appears in the historic record, during the 13th century, it was owned by the Freiherr of Wädenswil. In 1240 the Freiherr of Wädenswil sold the Sefinen Valley to Interlaken Monastery. Over the following century, the monastery and other local lords began to expand their power in the Lauterbrunnen and neighboring valleys. However, around 1300, the Lord of Turn began to settle his Walser-speaking people in the nearby Lötschen Valley and into the highlands of the Lauterbrunnen Valley. By 1346, the Walser villages of Lauterbrunnen, Gimmelwald, Mürren, Sichellauenen and Trachsellauenen all had village governments and a certain amount of independence from the monastery. Three years later, much of the Bernese Oberland unsuccessfully rose up against the monastery. When the monastery suppressed the rebellion, the Walser villages bore the brunt of the monastery's wrath.

By the 15th century, the villages of the valley were part of the large parish of Gsteig bei Interlaken (now part of Gsteigwiler). Between 1487 and 1488, the villagers in Lauterbrunnen built a filial church of the parish. In 1506, the parish appointed a full-time priest for Lauterbrunnen. In 1528, the city of Bern adopted the new faith of the Protestant Reformation and began imposing it on the Bernese Oberland. Lauterbrunnen joined many other villages and the monastery in an unsuccessful rebellion against the new faith. After Bern imposed its will on the Oberland, they secularized the monastery and annexed all the monastery lands. Lauterbrunnen became the center of a new Reformed parish.

Mines were built in the Trachsellauenen area in the upper valley beginning in the late 16th century. An iron smelter was built in Zweilütschinen (now part of Gündlischwand) in 1715 to process the iron ore from Trachsellauenen. Most of the money from the mines went to the noble landowners, and the villagers remained poor. In the 17th and 18th centuries the poverty was so widespread that many of the villagers joined mercenary regiments or emigrated. Many emigrants moved to the Carolinas in the United States.

Beginning in the late 18th century, foreign mountain climbers began to use Lauterbrunnen as a starting point for their expeditions into the nearby Alps. Initially the climbers stayed in the village rectory. However, as Lauterbrunnen's fame grew and with the completion of a road from Interlaken in 1834 and the 1890 Bernese Oberland Railway, more hotels were needed for tourists. As new hotels were built, other tourist infrastructure was also built in the village. Cable cars were built to Mürren in 1891 and to Wengen in 1893. But the most significant piece of infrastructure was the Jungfrau railway, which was built in 1912. The Jungfrau rack railway runs 9 km (5 1/2 mi) from Kleine Scheidegg to the highest railway station in Europe at Jungfraujoch. The railway runs almost entirely within a tunnel built into the Eiger and Mönch mountains and contains two stations in the middle of the tunnel where passengers can disembark to observe the neighboring mountains through windows built into the mountainside.

In 1909, the English brothers Walter and Arnold Lunn popularized skiing, curling and bobsledding at Lauterbrunnen. These winter sports provided a whole new group of winter tourists and converted the summer tourist industry into a year-round business. The tourist economy of Lauterbrunnen was devastated by World War I and II and the Great Depression. However, following the end of World War II, tourism rebounded. Many new vacation homes and chalets were built along with ski lifts, chair lifts and a heliport.

On 1 January 1973, the former municipality of Isenfluh merged into the municipality of Lauterbrunnen. On 31 December 2009, Amtsbezirk Interlaken, the municipality's former district, was dissolved. On the following day, 1 January 2010, it joined the newly created Verwaltungskreis Interlaken-Oberhasli.

In May 2024, it was reported the local authority had initiated a working group to explore solutions for over-tourism, drawing inspiration from Venice's trial entry fee for day trippers. One proposed measure is the introduction of a 5 to 10 Swiss franc entry fee, applicable to visitors arriving by car for the day, excluding those with pre-booked accommodations or arriving by public transport.

== Geography ==
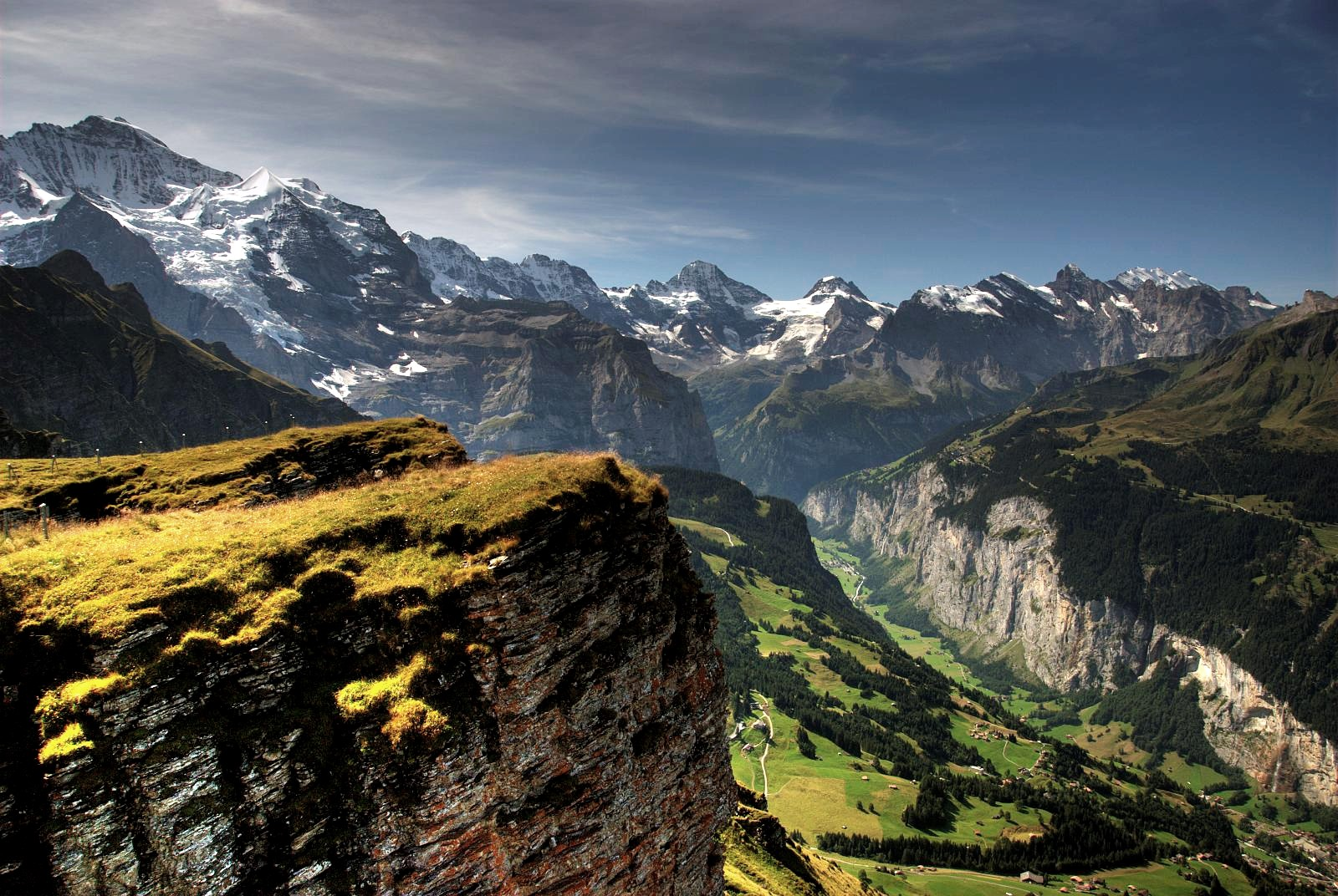
View of the valley from the Männlichen

Lauterbrunnen lies at the bottom of a U-shaped valley that extends south and then south-westwards from the village to meet the 8-kilometer (5.0 mi) Lauterbrunnen Wall. The Lauterbrunnen Valley (Lauterbrunnental) is one of the deepest in the Alpine chain when compared with the height of the mountains that rise directly on either side. It is a true cleft, rarely more than one kilometer in width, between limestone precipices, sometimes quite perpendicular and everywhere of extreme steepness. In places the cliff walls are up to 1,000 m (3,300 ft) high. It is to this form that the valley owes the numerous waterfalls from which it derives its name. The streams descending from the adjoining mountains and, on reaching the verge of the rocky walls of the valley, form cascades so high that they are almost lost in spray before they reach the level of the valley. The most famous of these is Staubbach Falls, less than one kilometer from the village of Lauterbrunnen. The 297 m (974 ft) high Staubbach is the highest free-falling waterfall in Switzerland. Also near Lauterbrunnen is the highest waterfall in Switzerland, the 417 m (1,368 ft) Mürrenbach Fall. Finally, the Mattenbachfall (cascade waterfall) with a height of 930 meters is Europe's highest waterfall and the third highest in the world.

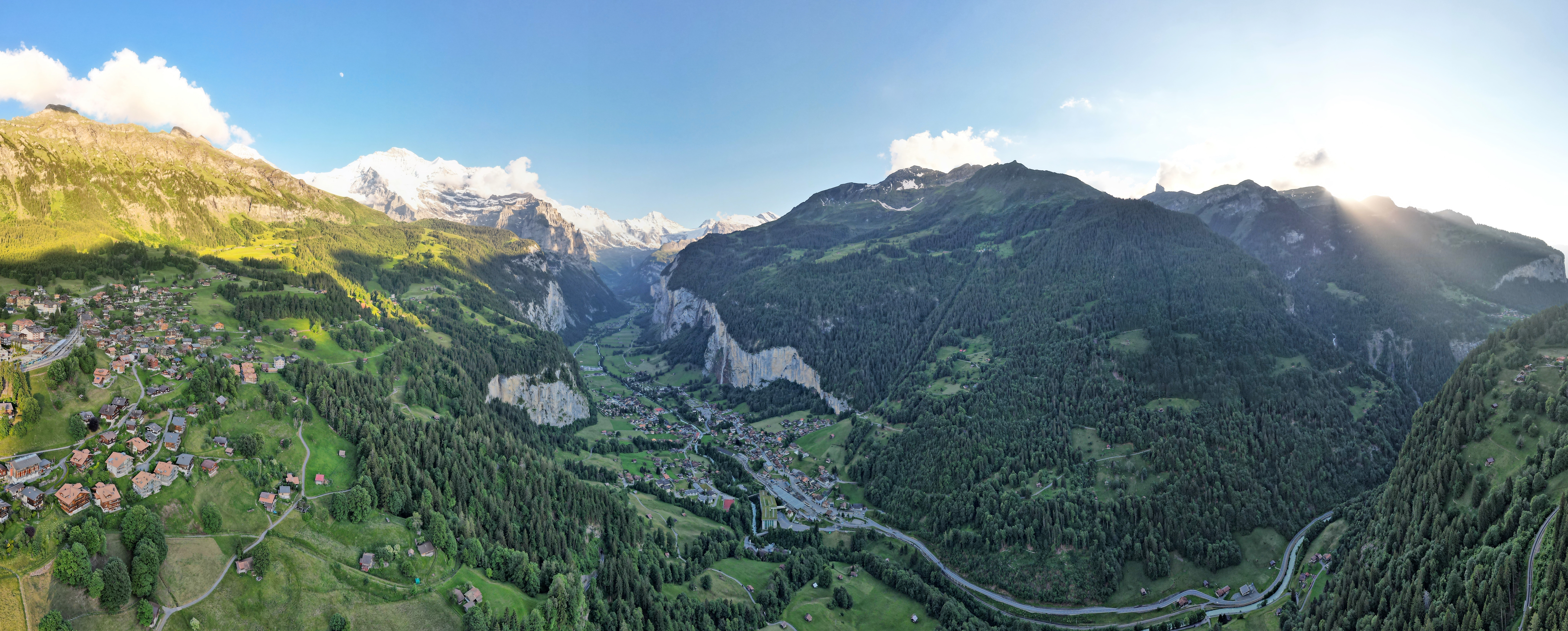
Lauterbrunnen Valley and Wengen 110622

The Weisse Lütschine river flows through Lauterbrunnen and overflows its banks about once a year. The source of the river comes from melting snow high in the mountains, thus making it a very pure and clean source of water. Trümmelbach Falls is 3 km (1.9 mi) from Lauterbrunnen, connected by bus from the station.

Notable waterfalls in Lauterbrunnen

- Staubbach Fall
- Trimmelbach Falls
- Mirrenbach Fall
- Spissbach Falls
- Sefinen Fall
- Staldenbach Falls
- Holdri Falls
- Talbach Fall

The valley also includes many glaciers, such as the Tschingelfirn and the Rottalgletscher.

The municipality of Lauterbrunnen extends a considerable distance beyond the village and valley, with an area of 164.51 km^{2} (63.52 sq mi). It reaches as far as the peaks of the Eiger, Mönch and Jungfrau to the east, the Gletscherhorn, Mittaghorn, Grosshorn, Breithorn and Tschingelhorn to the south, and the Gspaltenhorn and Schilthorn to the west. The Kleine Scheidegg Pass crosses over to Grindelwald to the east, whilst the Sefinenfurgge Pass crosses to Griesalp and Reichenbach im Kandertal to the west. Both passes carry hiking trails that form part of the Alpine Pass Route, a long-distance hiking trail across Switzerland between Sargans and Montreux. Besides the village of Lauterbrunnen, the municipality also includes the villages of Wengen, Mürren, Gimmelwald, Stechelberg, and Isenfluh.

Of the municipal area, 36.79 km^{2} (14.20 mi^{2}) or 22.4% is used for agricultural purposes, while 28.84 km^{2} (11.14 mi^{2}) or 17.5% is forested. Of the rest of the land, 2.31 km^{2} (0.89 mi^{2}) or 1.4% is settled (buildings or roads), 1.08 km^{2} (0.42 mi^{2}) or 0.7% is either rivers or lakes and 95.39 km^{2} (36.83 mi^{2}) or 58.0% is unproductive land. Of the built-up area, housing and buildings make up 0.7% and transportation infrastructure make up 0.5%. Of the forested land, 13.6% of the total land area is heavily forested and 2.0% is covered with orchards or small clusters of trees. Of the agricultural land, 3.5% is pastures and 18.9% is used for alpine pastures. All the water in the municipality is flowing water. Of the unproductive areas, 10.3% is unproductive vegetation, 31.3% is too rocky for vegetation and 16.3% of the land is covered by glaciers.

== Coat of arms ==
The blazon of the municipal coat of arms is Per fess Argent a Semi Ibex rampant couped Sable and Vert three Piles wavy issuant from base of the first. The three stripes represent three famous waterfalls around the village.

== Demographics ==
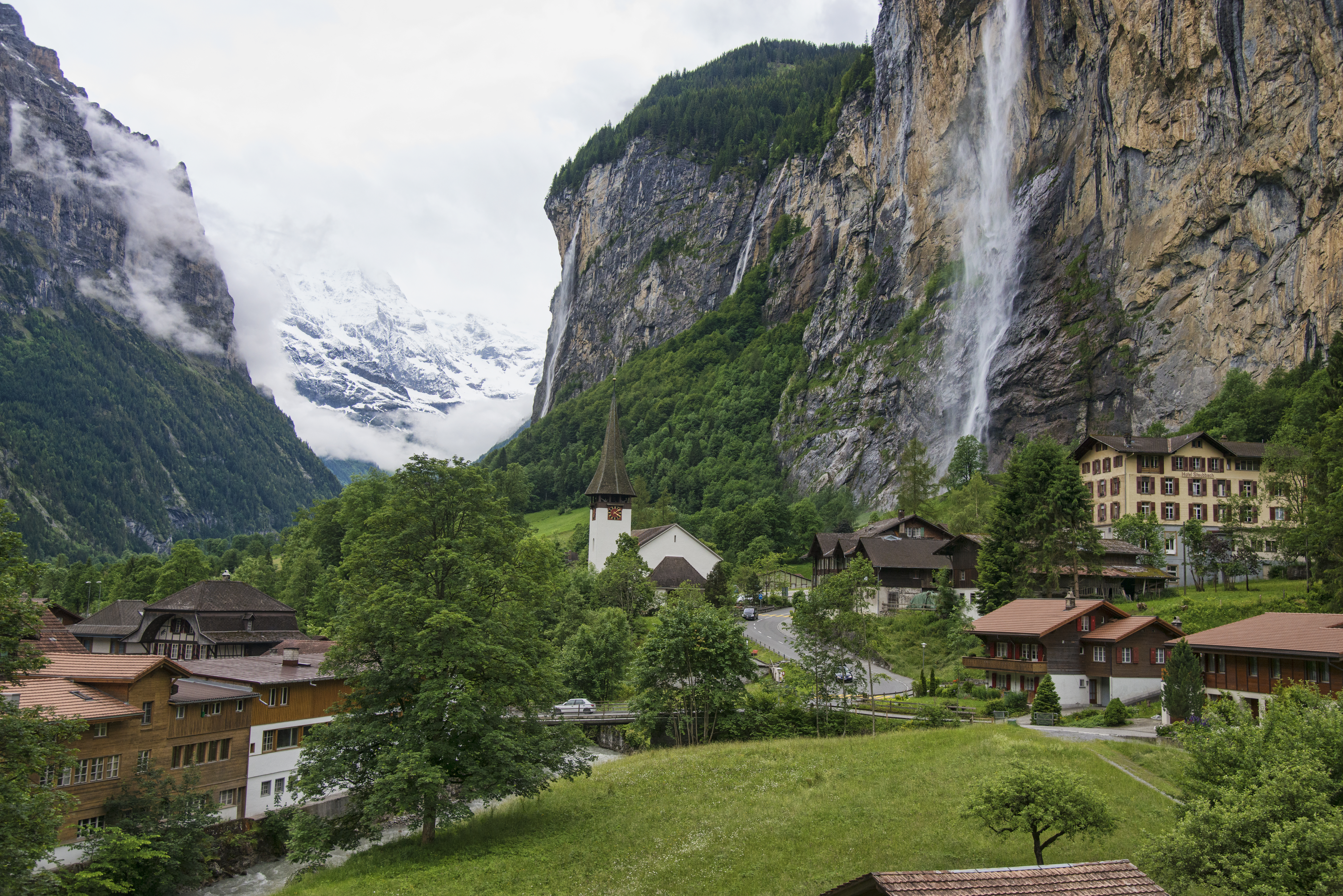
The Lauterbrunnen Valley: The village of Lauterbrunnen, the Staubbach Falls, and the Lauterbrunnen Wall in cloud (background)

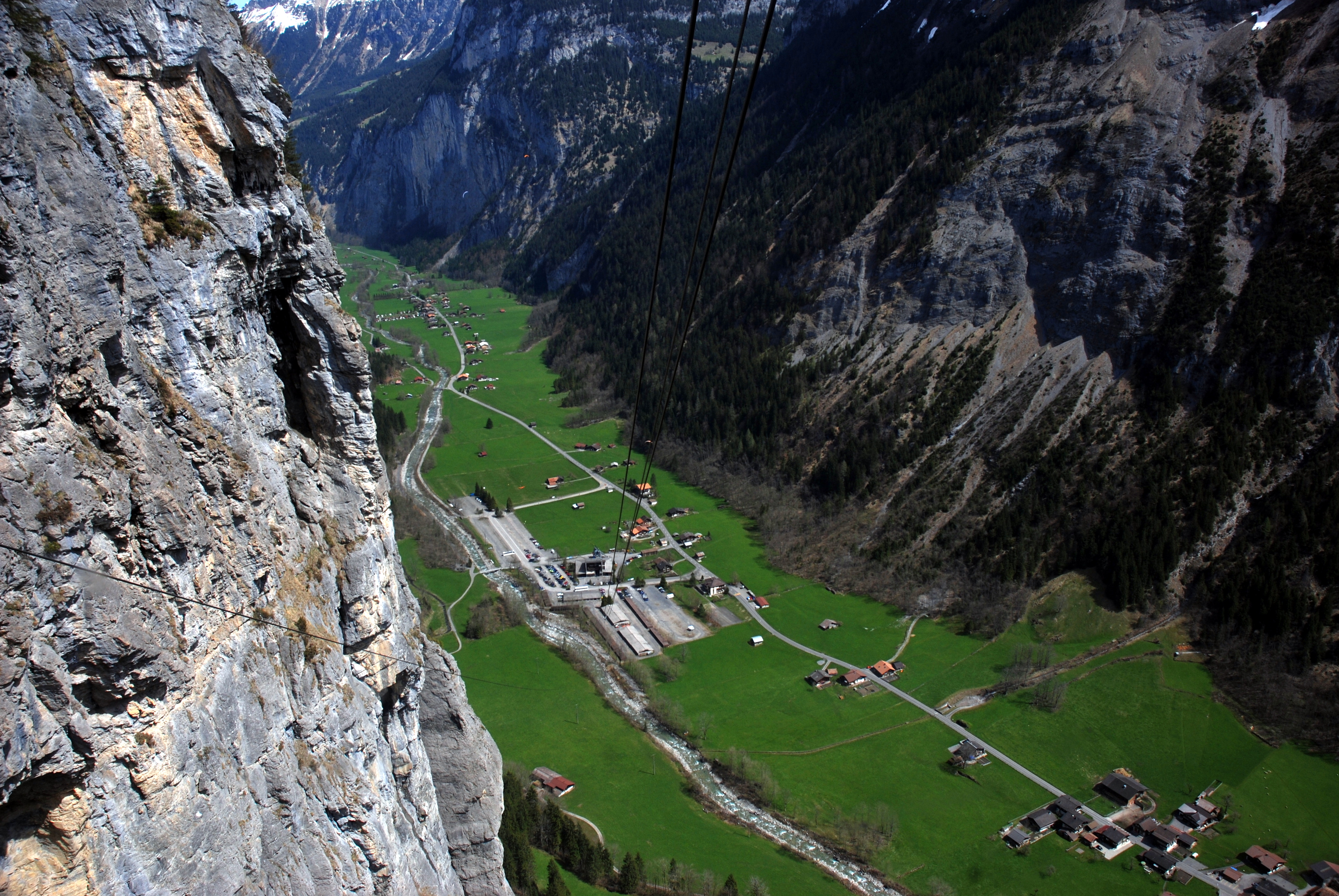
Lauterbrunnen Valley view from cable car

The village Lauterbrunnen has a population (as of December 2020) of 2,301. As of 2010, 22.6% of the population are resident foreign nationals. Over the last 10 years (2000–2010) the population has shrunk by 8.9%. Migration accounted for 6.5 percentage points of the decrease, while births and deaths accounted for 3.1.

Most of the population speaks German as their first language (as of 2000, 2,483 or 85.2%). Portuguese is the second most common (143 or 4.9%) and Croatian is the third (59 or 2.0%). There are 42 people who speak French, 40 who speak Italian and 5 who speak Romansh.

As of 2008, the population was 49.7% male and 50.3% female. The population was made up of 970 Swiss men (37.9% of the population) and 301 (11.8%) non-Swiss men. There were 1,011 Swiss women (39.5%) and 276 (10.8%) non-Swiss women. Of the population in the municipality, 1,221 or about 41.9% were born in Lauterbrunnen and lived there in 2000. There were 592 or 20.3% who were born in the same canton, while 386 or 13.2% were born somewhere else in Switzerland and 544 or 18.7% were born outside of Switzerland.

As of 2010, children and teenagers (0–19 years old) made up 17.2% of the population, while adults (20–64 years old) made up 62.5% and seniors (over 64 years old) made up 20.2%.

As of 2000, there were 1,195 people who were single and never married in the municipality. There were 1,420 married individuals, 208 widows or widowers and 91 individuals who were divorced.

As of 2000, there were 453 households that consist of only one person and 61 households with five or more people. In 2000, a total of 1,090 apartments (40.4% of the total) were permanently occupied, while 1,414 apartments (52.4%) were seasonally occupied and 196 apartments (7.3%) were empty. As of 2010, the construction rate of new housing units was 4.3 new units per 1000 residents. The vacancy rate for the municipality in 2011 was 0.66%.

The historical population is given in the following chart:

== Heritage sites of national significance ==
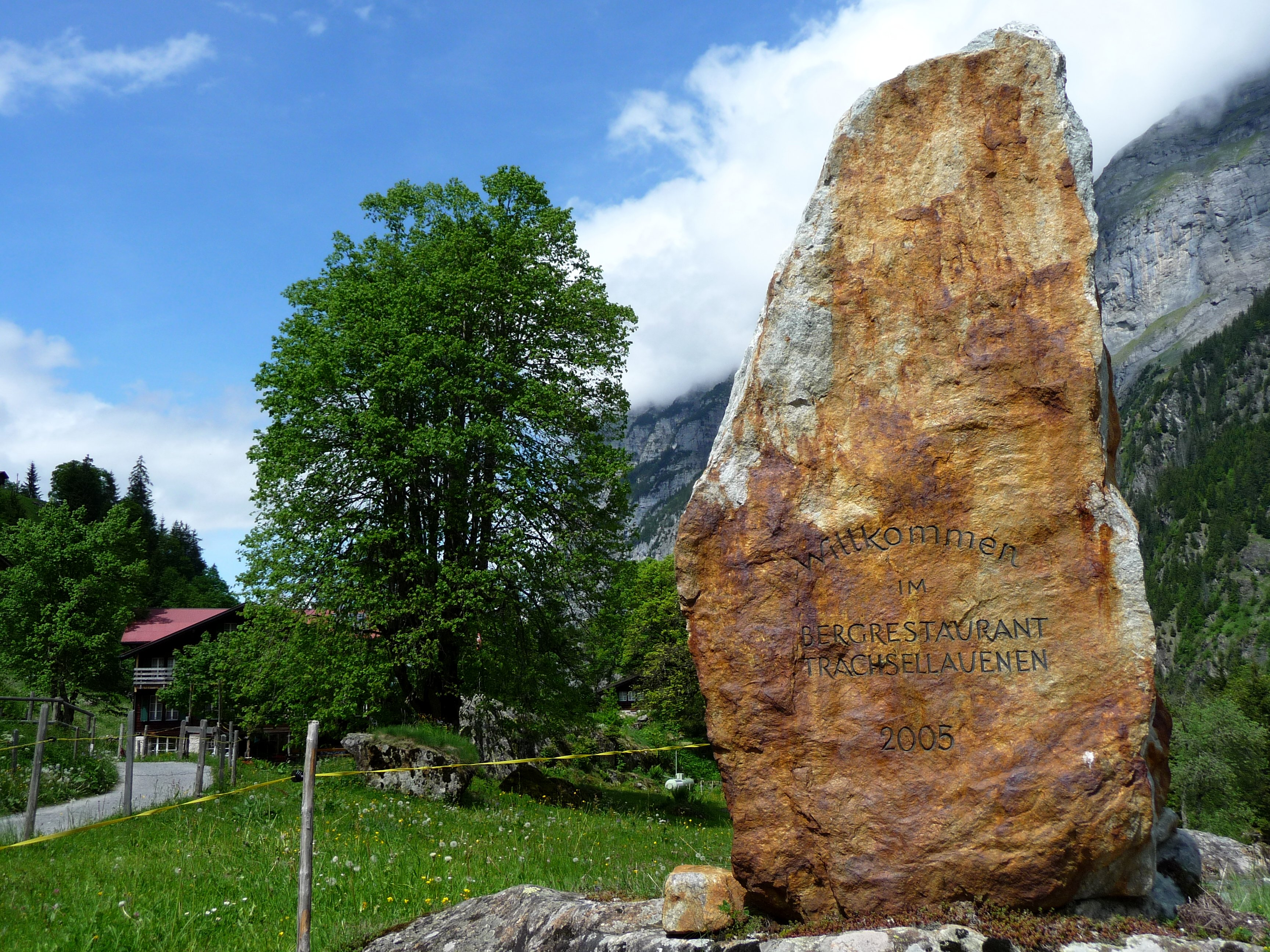
Trachsellauenen Silver Mine

The cableway between Stechelberg and Schilthorn and the Trachsellauenen silver mine, which was active in the medieval to early modern periods, are listed as Swiss heritage site of national significance. The village of Gimmelwald and the Kleine Scheidegg region are both part of the Inventory of Swiss Heritage Sites.

== Politics ==
In the 2011 federal election the most popular party was the Swiss People's Party (SVP) which received 29.6% of the vote. The next three most popular parties were the Conservative Democratic Party (BDP) (21.5%), the Social Democratic Party (SP) (14.6%) and the FDP.The Liberals (14.3%). In the federal election, a total of 733 votes were cast, and the voter turnout was 43.0%.

== Economy ==
As of 2011, Lauterbrunnen had an unemployment rate of 1.9%. As of 2008, there were a total of 1,908 people employed in the municipality. Of these, there were 147 people employed in the primary economic sector and about 55 businesses involved in this sector. 223 people were employed in the secondary sector and there were 35 businesses in this sector. 1,538 people were employed in the tertiary sector, with 195 businesses in this sector. There were 1,623 residents of the municipality who were employed in some capacity, of which females made up 43.1% of the workforce.

In 2008 there were a total of 1,605 full-time equivalent jobs. The number of jobs in the primary sector was 77, of which 70 were in agriculture and 7 were in forestry or lumber production. The number of jobs in the secondary sector was 207 of which 20 or (9.7%) were in manufacturing and 124 (59.9%) were in construction. The number of jobs in the tertiary sector was 1,321. In the tertiary sector; 132 or 10.0% were in wholesale or retail sales or the repair of motor vehicles, 231 or 17.5% were in the movement and storage of goods, 687 or 52.0% were in a hotel or restaurant, 75 or 5.7% were in education and 56 or 4.2% were in health care.

In 2000, there were 360 workers who commuted into the municipality and 252 workers who commuted away. The municipality is a net importer of workers, with about 1.4 workers entering the municipality for every one leaving. Of the working population, 12.5% used public transportation to get to work, and 12.3% used a private car.

=== Tourism ===
Lauterbrunnen is a touristic destination. It is especially known for being the mecca of wingsuit base jumping.

==== Wingsuit base jumping ====
The Lauterbrunnen Valley is renowned as a prime location for wingsuit BASE jumping, attracting enthusiasts from around the globe. This narrow valley is surrounded by steep rock faces and features 13 legal jump points. Many consider it a mecca for BASE jumpers. Approximately 20,000 jumps are recorded annually, which is about four times the number recorded in the early 2000s and twice as much as in the 2010s. · In 2023, 600 BASE jumpers from various countries visited Lauterbrunnen to engage in this extreme sport.

Wingsuit BASE jumping is an extreme sport with a high fatality rate. In Lauterbrunnen, the average is three fatalities per year. The first fatal accident occurred in 1994, claiming the life of BASE jumper and alpinist Xaver Bongard, who had introduced the sport to the valley in 1989 after being introduced to it by Will Oxx in Yosemite. Since then, and as of July 2024, 68 BASE jumpers have died in the Lauterbrunnen Valley. In 2021, the parish of Lauterbrunnen unveiled a memorial in its cemetery, dedicated to BASE jumpers and mountaineers who lost their lives in the pursuit of adventure in the valley.

BASE jumping is legal in Switzerland. In Lauterbrunnen, authorities require BASE jumpers to purchase a landing card from the Swiss BASE Association, although unlike skydiving, no license is required.

== Religion ==
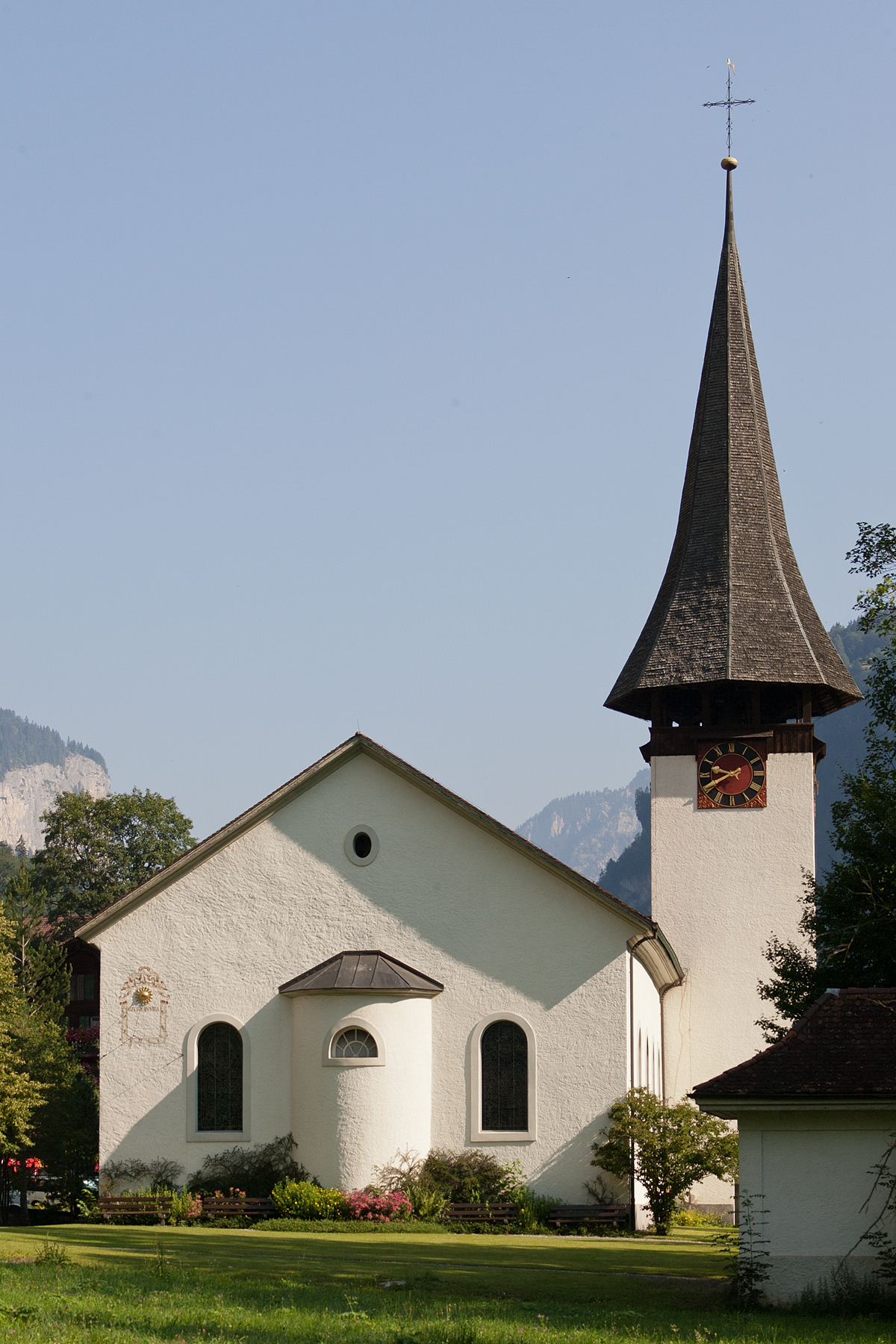
Lauterbrunnen village church

From the 2000 census, 513 or 17.6% were Roman Catholic, while 1,973 or 67.7% belonged to the Swiss Reformed Church. Of the rest of the population, there were 34 members of an Orthodox church (or about 1.17% of the population), and there were 47 individuals (or about 1.61% of the population) who belonged to another Christian church. There was 1 individual who was Jewish, and 28 (or about 0.96% of the population) who were Muslim. There were 3 individuals who were Buddhist and 2 individuals who belonged to another church. 144 (or about 4.94% of the population) belonged to no church, were agnostic or atheist, and 187 individuals (or about 6.42% of the population) did not answer the question.

== Climate ==
Between 1981 and 2010 Lauterbrunnen had an average of 136.5 days of rain or snow per year and on average received 1,207 mm (47.5 in) of precipitation. The wettest month was July during which time Lauterbrunnen received an average of 144 mm (5.7 in) of rain or snow. During this month there was precipitation for an average of 13.8 days. The month with the most days of precipitation was June, with an average of 14.1, but with only 133 mm (5.2 in) of rain or snow. The driest month of the year was October with an average of 78 mm (3.1 in) of precipitation over 9.5 days.

== Transport ==
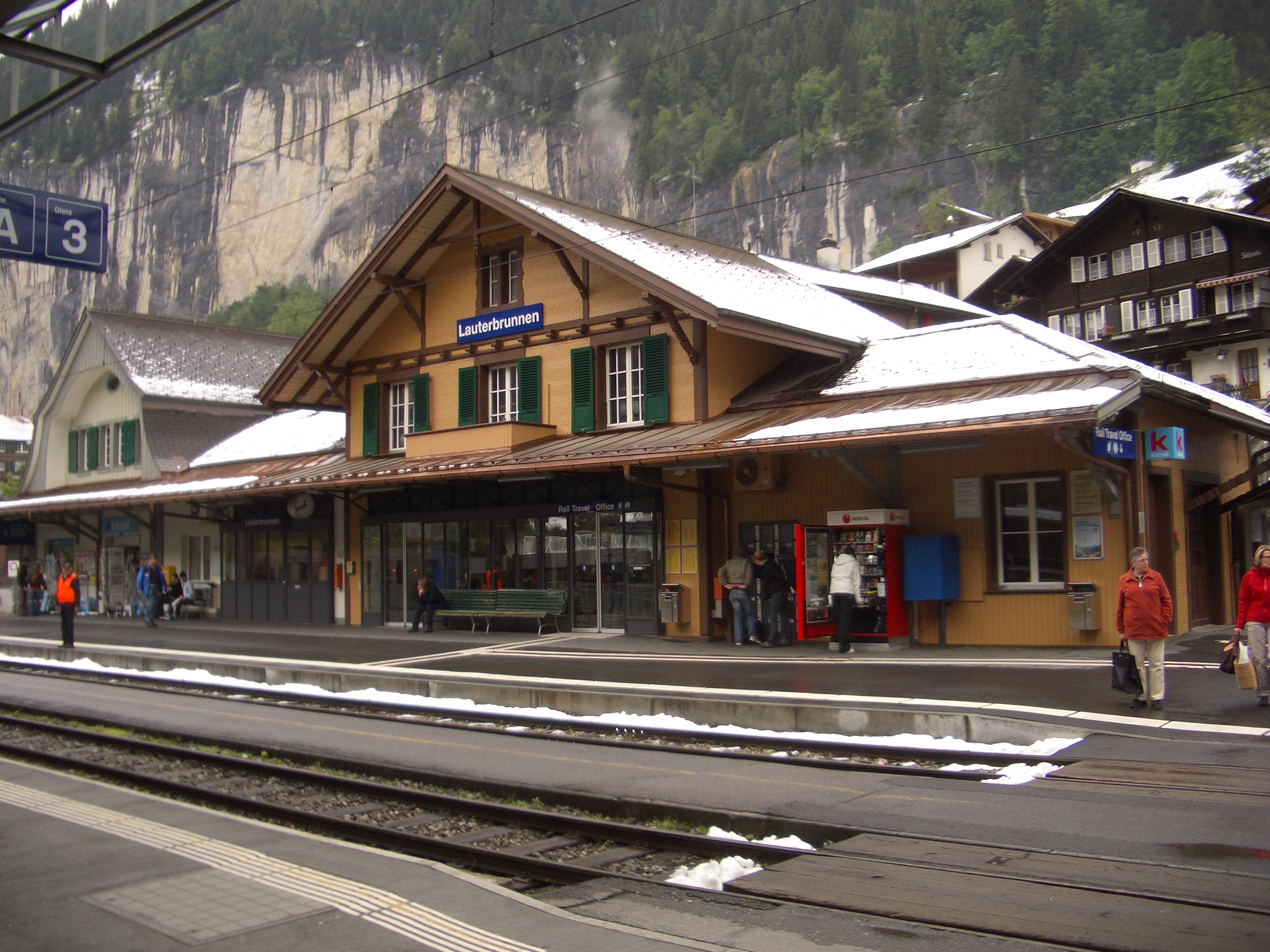
Lauterbrunnen railway station

Lauterbrunnen railway station, in the centre of Lauterbrunnen village, is served by trains of the Berner Oberland Bahn, which run to Interlaken, and by trains of the Wengernalpbahn, which run to Wengen, Kleine Scheidegg and on to Grindelwald; at Kleine Scheidegg connection can be made with the Jungfraubahn, which ascends inside the Eiger to the Jungfraujoch. The lower terminal of the Bergbahn Lauterbrunnen-Mürren, a cable car and connecting train, is adjacent to the main station and provides service to Mürren.

Besides Lauterbrunnen station, there are nine other railway stations within the municipality of Lauterbrunnen. These are Wengwald, Wengen, Allmend, Wengernalp and Kleine Scheidegg on the Wengernalpbahn, Eigergletscher on the Jungfraubahn, and Grütschalp, Winteregg and Mürren on the Bergbahn Lauterbrunnen-Mürren.

Post bus services link Lauterbrunnen village to Stechelberg and the Trümmelbach Falls, and to Isenfluh. An alternative route to Mürren is available using the bus to Stechelberg and then the Luftseilbahn Stechelberg-Mürren-Schilthorn cable car.

== Education ==
In Lauterbrunnen about 1,155 or (39.6%) of the population have completed non-mandatory upper secondary education, and 230 or (7.9%) have completed additional higher education (either university or a Fachhochschule). Of the 230 who completed tertiary schooling, 60.0% were Swiss men, 20.9% were Swiss women, 10.0% were non-Swiss men and 9.1% were non-Swiss women.

The Canton of Bern school system provides one year of non-obligatory kindergarten, followed by six years of primary school. This is followed by three years of obligatory lower secondary school where the students are separated according to ability and aptitude. Following the lower secondary school, students may attend additional schooling or they may enter an apprenticeship.

During the 2010-11 school year, there were a total of 247 students attending classes in Lauterbrunnen. There were 3 kindergarten classes with a total of 36 students in the municipality. Of the kindergarten students, 16.7% were permanent or temporary residents of Switzerland (not citizens) and 16.7% have a different mother language than the classroom language. The municipality had 8 primary classes and 125 students. Of the primary students, 19.2% were permanent or temporary residents of Switzerland (not citizens) and 20.8% have a different mother language than the classroom language. During the same year, there were 3 lower secondary classes with a total of 65 students. There were 10.8% who were permanent or temporary residents of Switzerland (not citizens) and 10.8% have a different mother language than the classroom language. The remainder of the students attend a private or special school.

As of 2000, there were 5 students in Lauterbrunnen who came from another municipality, while 45 residents attended schools outside the municipality.

== Crime ==
In 2014 the crime rate in Lauterbrunnen was 49.2 per thousand residents. During the same period, the rate of drug crimes was 0 per thousand residents. The rate of violations of immigration, visa, and work permit laws was 6.6 per thousand residents. This rate is three times the rate in the district, as well as twice the rate in the canton.

== Cultural references ==
Johann Wolfgang von Goethe's poem "Gesang der Geister über den Wassern" ("Song of the Spirits over the Waters") was written while he stayed at the parish house near the Staubbach Falls waterfall in Lauterbrunnen.

J. R. R. Tolkien hiked from Interlaken to the Lauterbrunnen Valley while on a trip to the Continent in 1911. The landscape of the valley later provided the concept and pictorial model for his sketches and watercolours of the fictitious valley of Rivendell, the dwelling place of Elrond Half-elven and his people.

Lauterbrunnen featured in several scenes from the 1969 James Bond film On Her Majesty's Secret Service, including a car chase in which Bond (played for the only time by George Lazenby) was driven away from henchmen of Ernst Stavro Blofeld by his girlfriend Tracy di Vicenzo in a dramatic pursuit which culminated in them shaking off the pursuers in a stock car race. The 360 degree revolving restaurant Piz Gloria which crowns the Schilthorn peak was used to film Blofeld's hideout. In the movie Bond escapes from it by skiing down the mountain to reach the village of Mürren at its base.

The location features in the Forza Motorsport series of games, with a fictional track by the name of 'Bernese Alps' incorporated into the mountainside.
