= Lauterbrunnen Wall =

Geological formation

Coordinates: 46.5730°N 7.9030°E

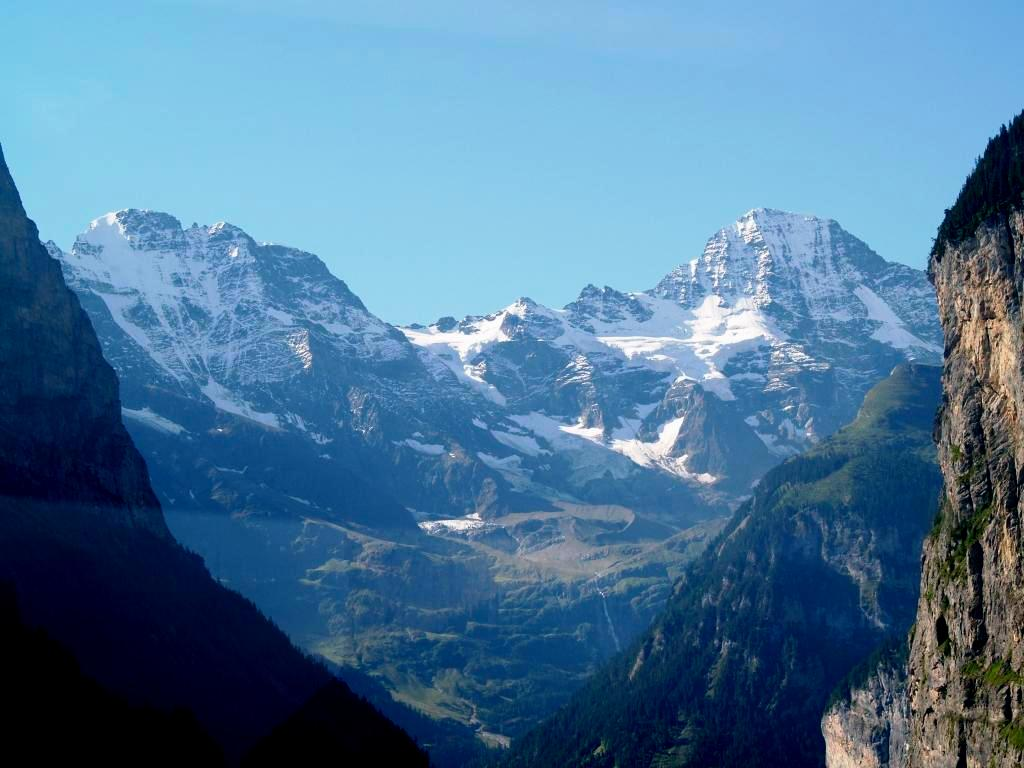
The western section of the Lauterbrunnen Wall, with the north faces of the Grosshorn (left) and the Breithorn (right)

The Lauterbrunnen Wall is a term used in the English-speaking mountaineering world to refer to a north-west-facing mountain wall in the Bernese Alps in Switzerland. It runs for 8 kilometres from the Gletscherhorn (3,983 m) in the east, through the Ebnefluh, (3,962 m), the Mittaghorn (3,897m) and the Grosshorn (3,754 m), to the Breithorn (3,785 m) in the west, where the wall comes to an end at the col which separates it from the Tschingelhorn. The Wall is named after the village of Lauterbrunnen, which lies to the north.

The Wall has been a popular venue for ice-climbing since the 1930s, when it was tackled by Feuz, von Allmen and Welzenbach. Many of the routes are less frequently attempted today, because of relatively difficult access (in the context of the Alps) and objective danger.

On 12 April 2007 a Luftwaffe Tornado stationed in Lechfeld, Bavaria crashed high into the Wall between the Mittaghorn and the Ebnefluh. The jet was "practically pulverized" and the pilot was killed on impact; his weapon systems officer, who ejected, was rescued by the mountain rescue services. The cause of the crash was poor flight planning: The Lauterbrunnen valley is unsuitable for military fighter jets because of heavy paraglider, hang glider and helicopter traffic during the day time, and as the jet had refuelled just a short time ago at Emmen Air Base, the configuration of the Tornado was too heavy for the necessary climb rate to clear the Lauterbrunnen Wall, although the crew did not violate any regulations during their flight.
