= WAB He 2/2 51–58 =

Swiss electric rack railway locomotive

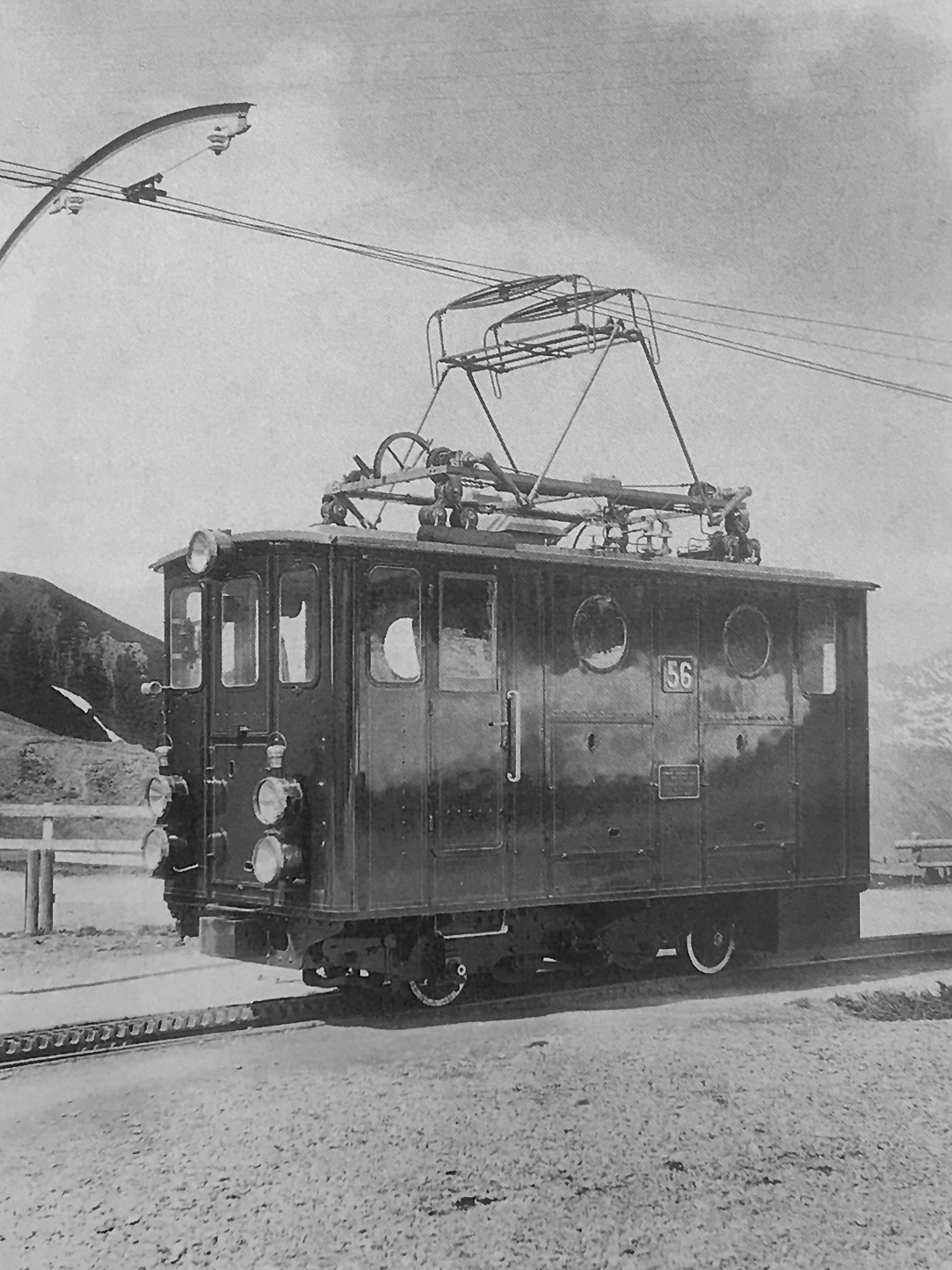
- Factory photograph of Alioth of the He 2/2 56, 1910
Type and origin
- Power type: Electric
- Builder: Swiss Locomotive and Machine Works (SLM), Elektrizitätsgesellschaft Alioth (EAG)
- Build date: 1909–1910
- Total produced: 8
Specifications
- Configuration
  - UIC: 2_{zz}
- Gauge: 800 mm (2 ft 7 1/2 in)
- Length: 5’740 mm
- Loco weight: 16 tonnes (16 long tons; 18 short tons)
- Electric system/s: 1,500 V DC Catenary
- Current pickup(s): Pantograph
Performance figures
- Maximum speed: 12 km/h (7 mph)
- Power output: 227 kW (300 hp)
Career
- Operators: WAB
- Numbers: 51 to 58

The He 2/2 51 to 58 of the Wengernalp Railway, abbreviated WAB, are electric rack railway locomotive for 1500 volt direct current and a track gauge of 800 mm. They were built in 1909 and 1910 on the occasion of the electrification of the railway lines Lauterbrunnen–Wengernalp–Kleine Scheidegg as well as Grindelwald–Grindelwald Grund–Kleine Scheidegg and served as a model for the largely identical locomotives that were subsequently procured He 2/2 59 to 63.

The machines with two running axles and two drive rack gears are pure rack railway locomotives. The two drive gears, for the Riggenbach-Pauli and Von Roll rack system, are not mounted on the running axles, but directly next to the running axles towards the center of the vehicle. The mechanical part comes from the Swiss Locomotive and Machine Works, abbreviated SLM, in Winterthur, the locomotives received the electrical equipment through the Elektrizitätsgesellschaft Alioth, abbreviated EGA, colloquial Alioth, in Münchenstein. For the descent, the locomotives have a self-excited electric rheostatic braking as an inertia brake, with which it is possible to make the descent with the pantograph lowered.

Characteristic of the long life machines is the angular locomotive body with the porthole-shaped engine room windows on both sides and a powerful looking pantograph with two sidle plate, who has little in common with pantographers of that time or today. It was just in the 1960s and the first half of the 1970s that the locomotives received pantographs of the usual design. It is common for the locomotives to be used in fine weather and the associated higher temperatures with open valley-side front windows, these have a central swivel mount for this purpose, as well as with open driver's cab doors.

== Gallery ==
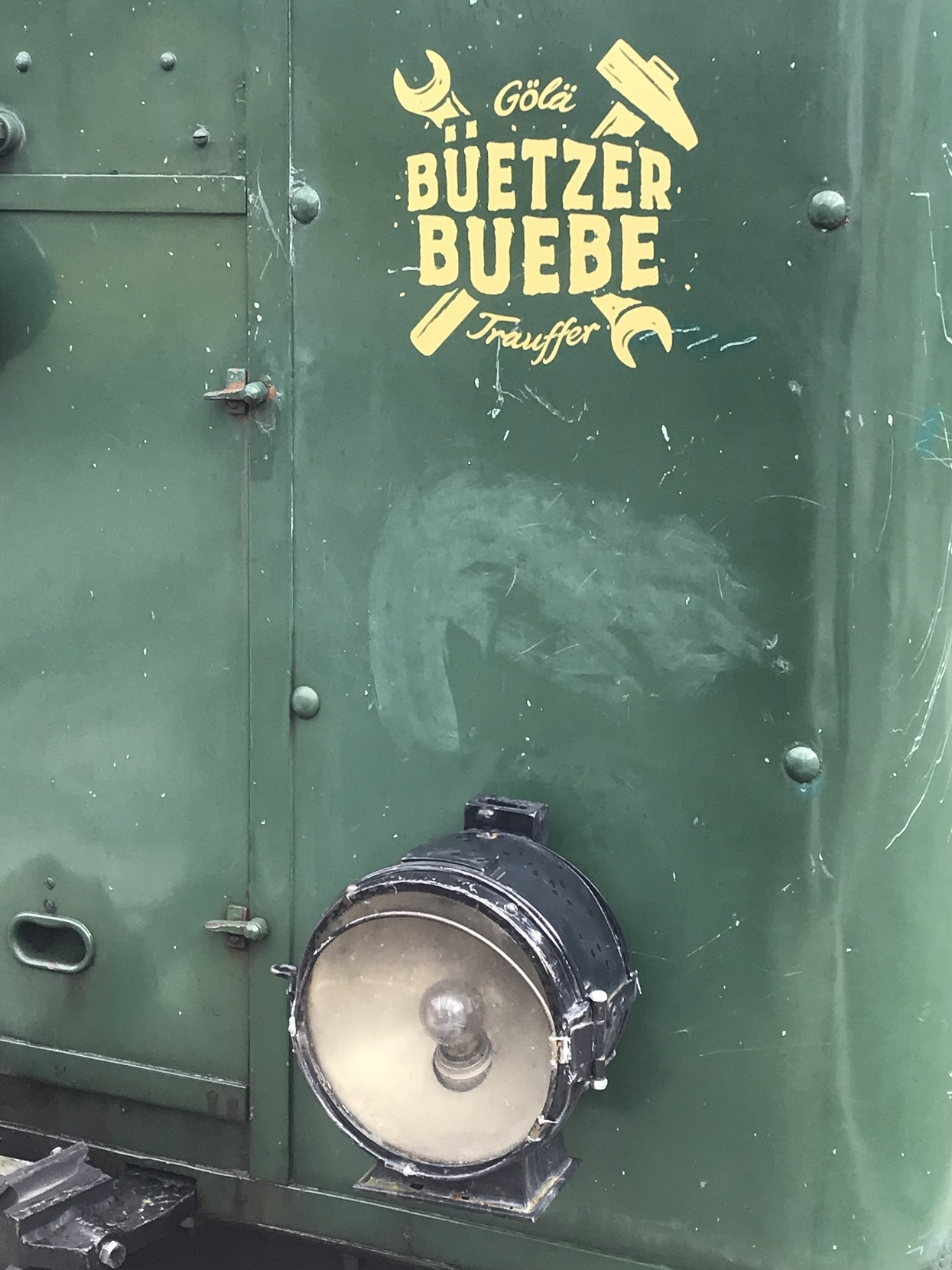
Front of WAB He 2/2 54 with inscription Gölä Büetzer Buebe Trauffer and one of the electric lamps with socket, 2020

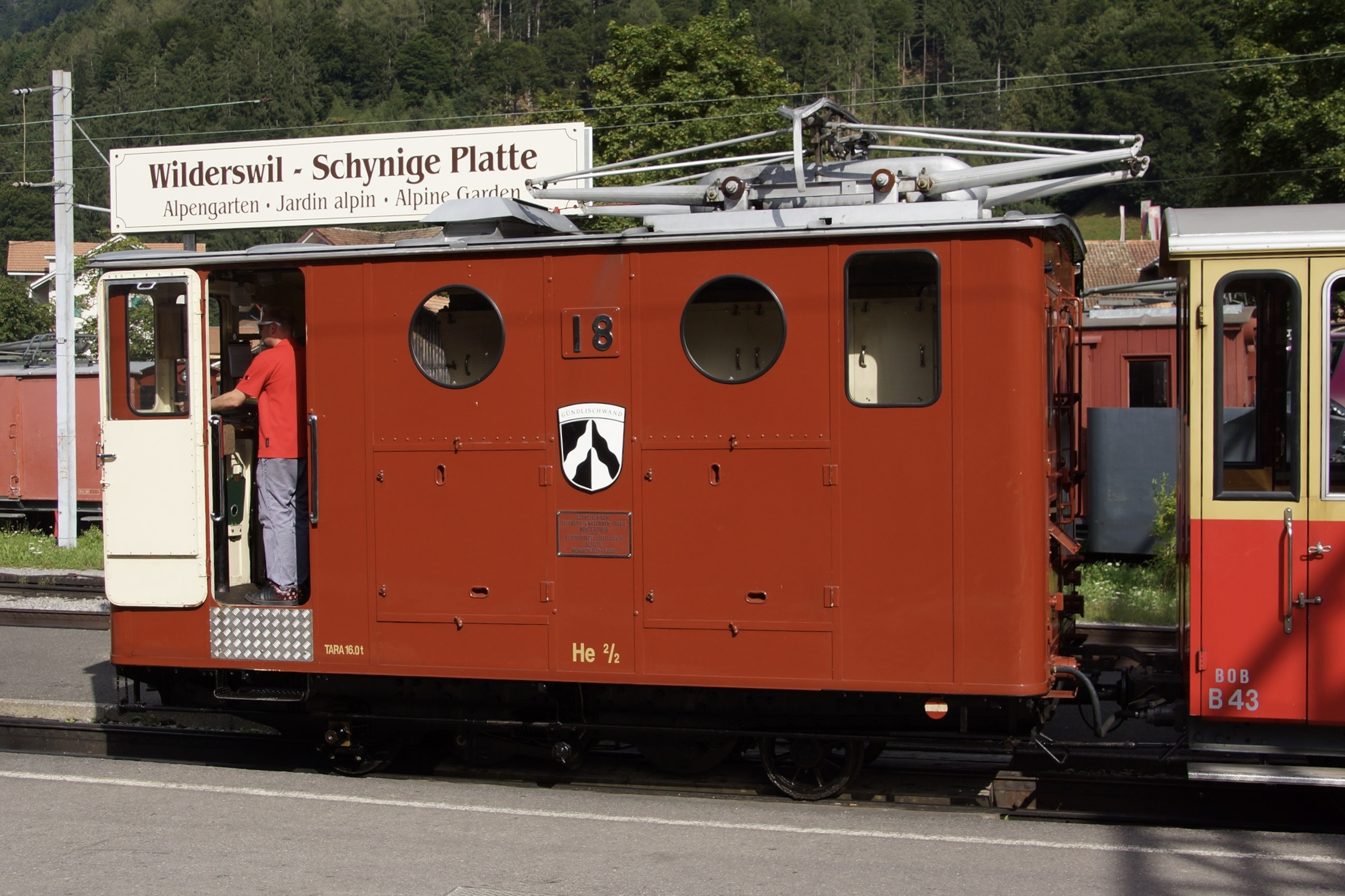
SPB He 2/2 18 Gündlischwand former WAB He 2/2 58 in brown colour scheme in Wilderswil, 2015

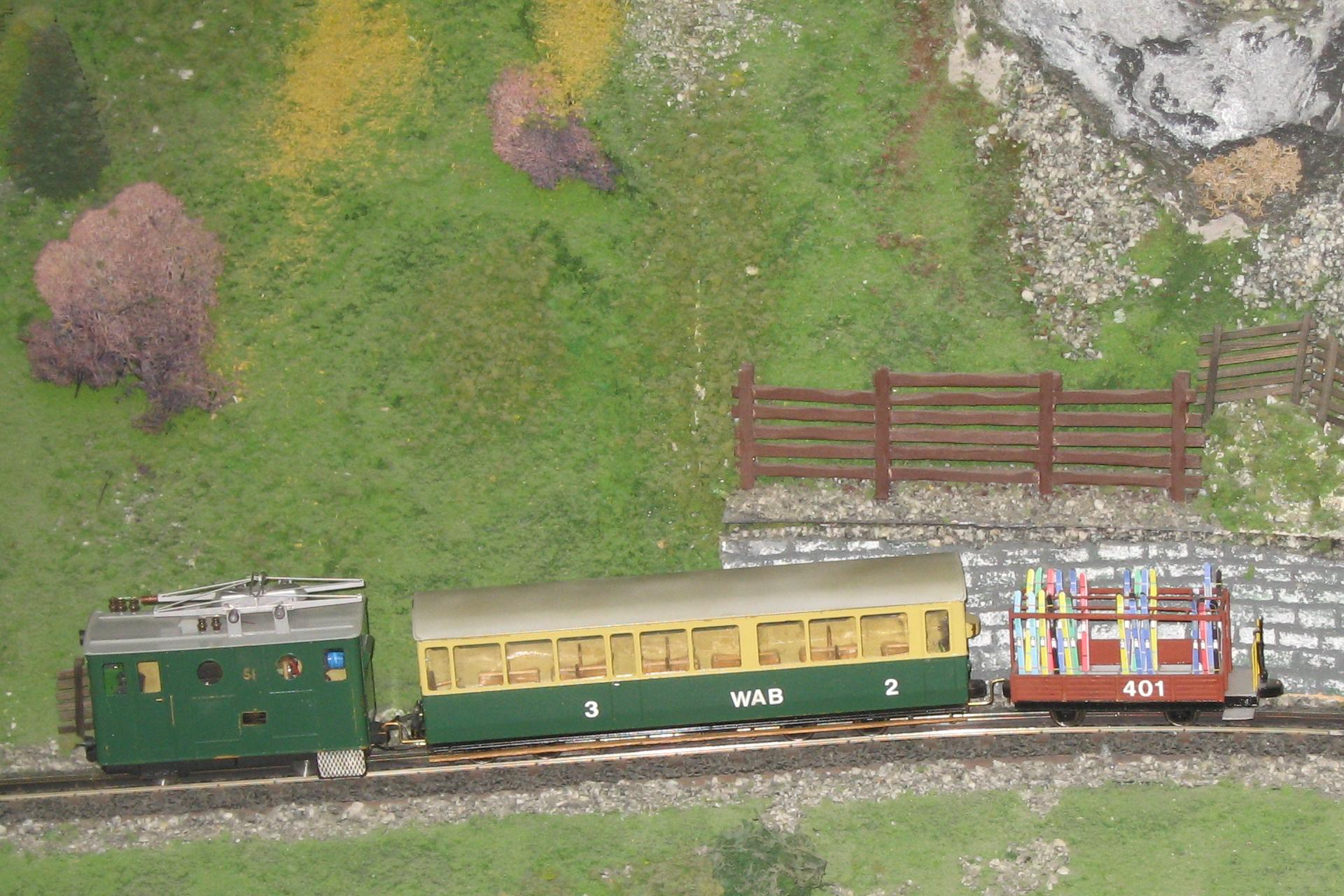
0e gauge rack railway train model of the WAB with He 2/2 from the series He 2/2 51 to 58 in Bern, 2012

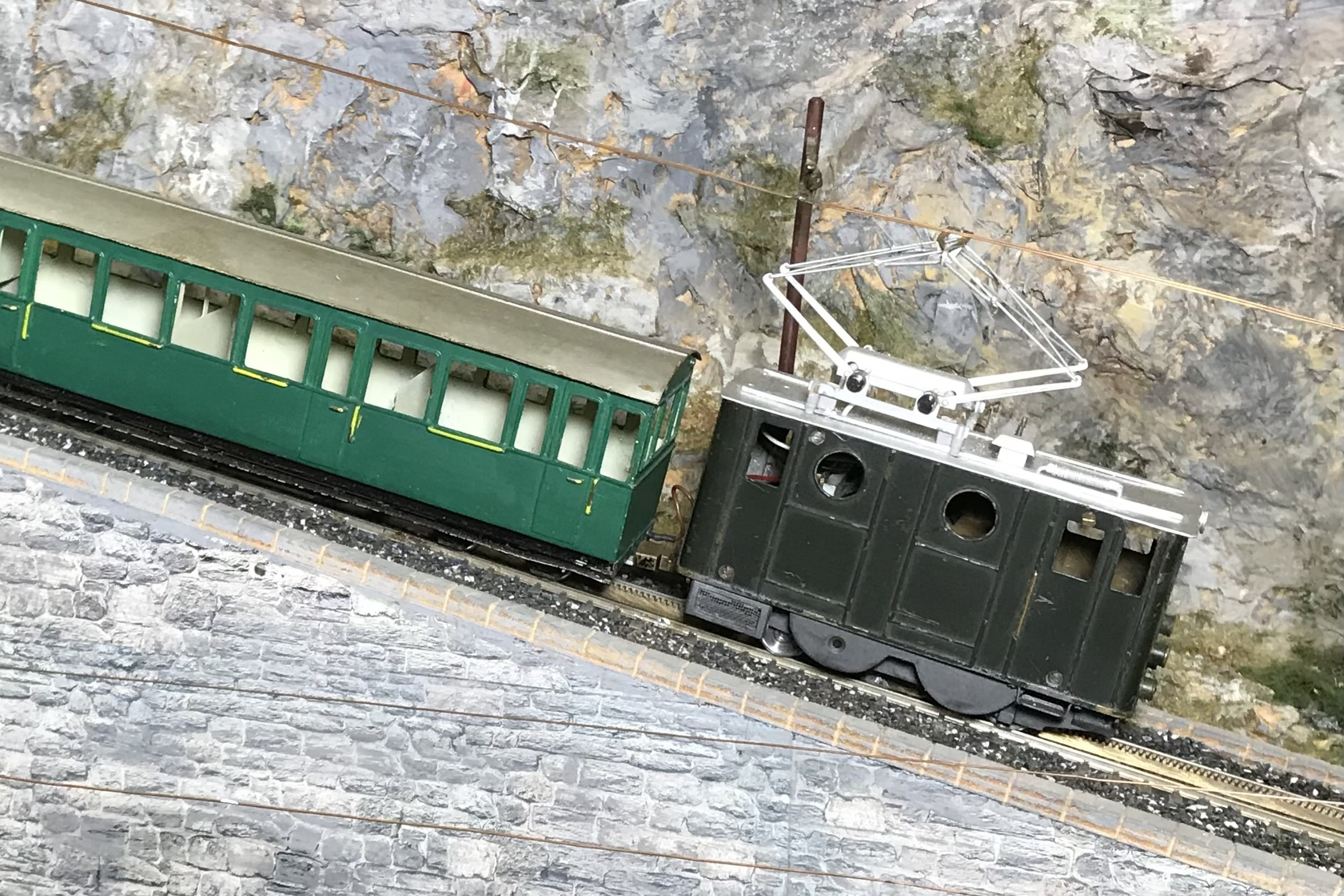
0e gauge rack railway train model of the WAB with He 2/2 from the series He 2/2 51 to 58 in Basel, 2021

== Sources ==
- Leissigen, Florian Inäbnit (2006). Wengernalpbahn : Linie Lauterbrunnen–Kleine Scheidegg–Grindelwald der Jungfraubahnen : längste durchgehende Zahnradbahn Europas. Volume 14. Prellbock Druck & Verlag.
- Leissigen, Brawand Hansruedi (2003). Schynige Platte-Bahn : die Bergstrecke der Berner Oberland-Bahnen : mit nostalgischem Cachet. Volume 15. Prellbock Druck & Verlag.
