= Breitlauihorn =

Mountain in Switzerland

- Location within Switzerland

Highest point
- Elevation: 3,654 m (11,988 ft)
- Prominence: 87 m (285 ft)
- Parent peak: Breithorn (Blatten)
- Coordinates: 46°24′46″N 7°52′52″E

Geography
- Location: Valais, Switzerland
- Parent range: Bernese Alps

The Breitlauihorn (3,654 m) is a mountain of the Bernese Alps, located east of Blatten in the canton of Valais. It lies west of the Breithorn (Blatten), on the range between the Lötschental and the Baltschiedertal.
