= Sattelhorn =

Mountain in Switzerland

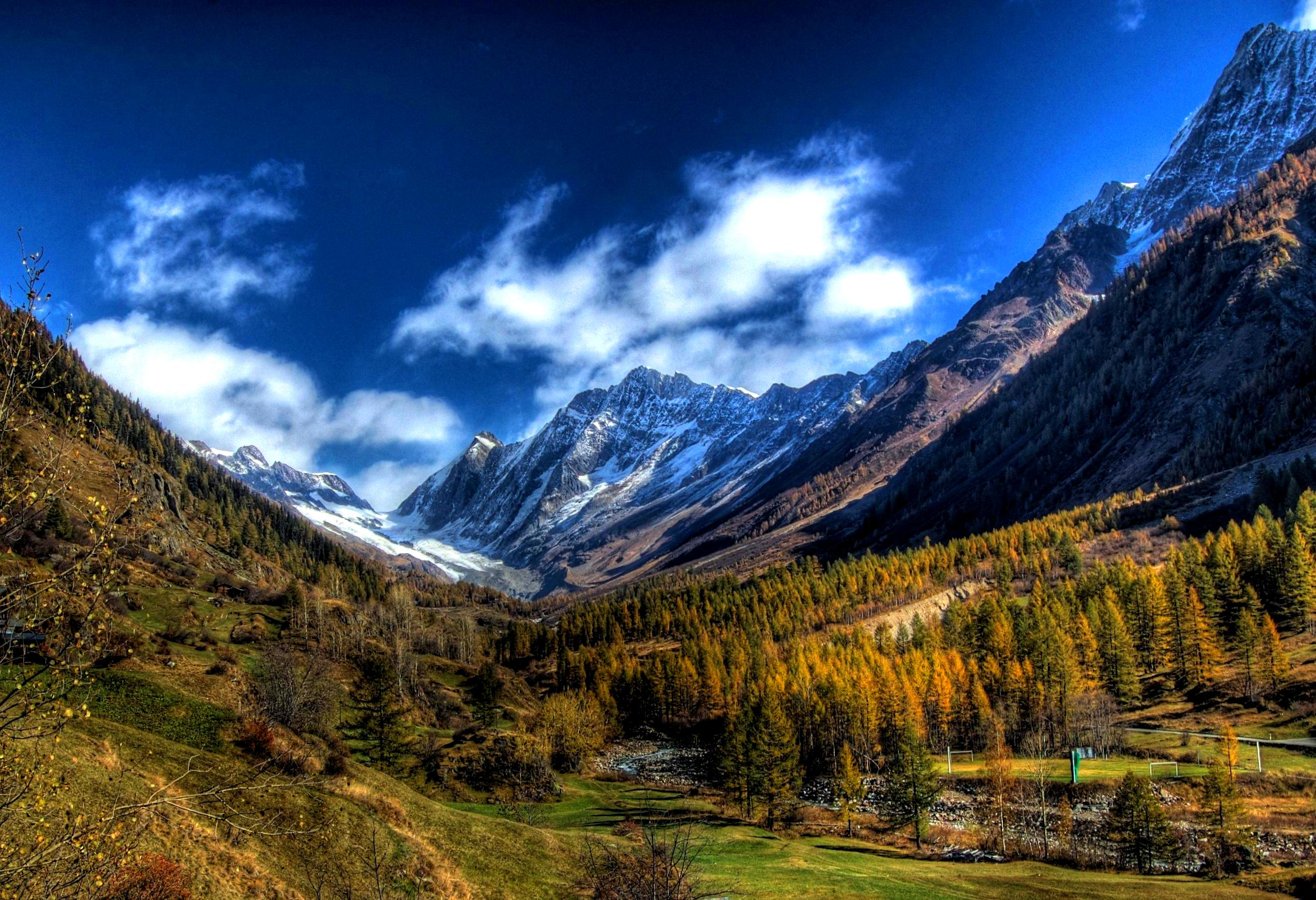
- The Sattelhorn (center-left) from the Lötschental

Highest point
- Elevation: 3,744 m (12,283 ft)
- Prominence: 126 m (413 ft)
- Parent peak: Aletschhorn
- Coordinates: 46°28′6″N 7°57′56.1″E

Geography
- Location within Switzerland
- Location: Valais, Switzerland
- Parent range: Bernese Alps

Climbing
- First ascent: 26 August 1883 by Karl Schulz, Alexander Burgener and J. Rittler

The Sattelhorn is a mountain of the Bernese Alps, overlooking the Lötschenlücke in the canton of Valais. It lies west of the Aletschhorn, between the Lang Glacier and the Oberaletsch Glacier.
