= Breithorn (Lauterbrunnen) =

Mountain in Switzerland

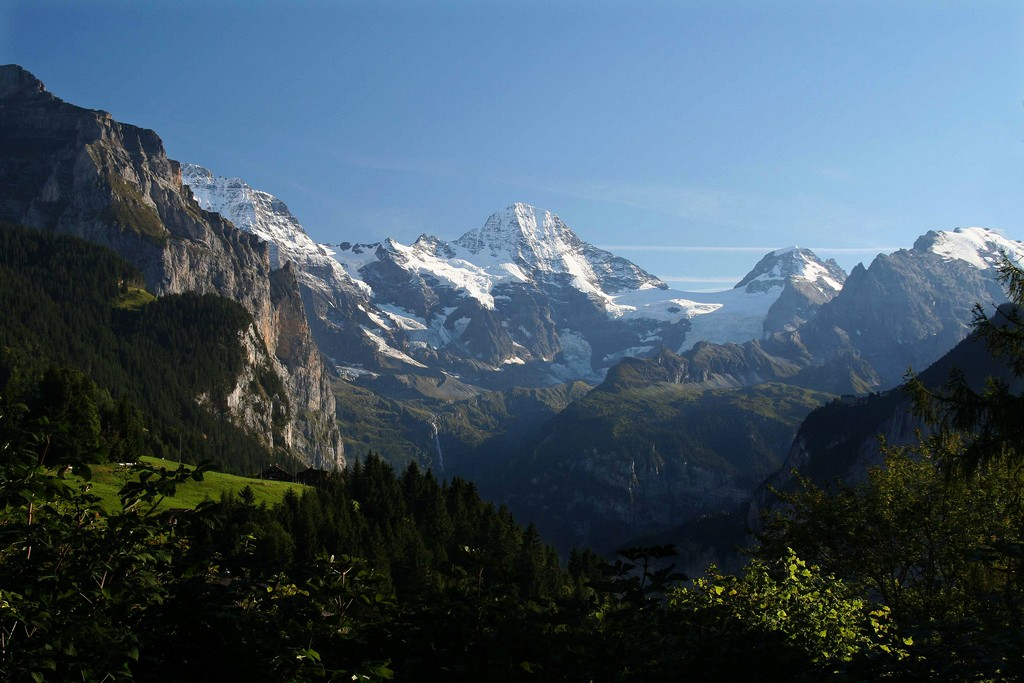
- The Breithorn above the Lauterbrunnental

Highest point
- Elevation: 3,780 m (12,400 ft)
- Prominence: 464 m (1,522 ft)
- Parent peak: Jungfrau
- Listing: Alpine mountains above 3000 m
- Coordinates: CH-VS_scale:100000 46°28′42.3″N 7°52′35.7″E

Naming
- Native name: Breithorn (German)
- English translation: Broad Horn

Geography
- Location within Switzerland
- Country: Switzerland
- Cantons: Bern and Valais
- Parent range: Bernese Alps
- Topo map: Swisstopo topographic maps

Climbing
- First ascent: Edmund von Fellenberg (31 July 1865)

The Breithorn (Swiss Standard German pronunciation: [ˈbraɪthɔrn]; 3,780 m) is a mountain of the Bernese Alps, located on the border between the Swiss cantons of Bern and Valais. It is part of the border between Lauterbrunnental and the Lötschental. It lies approximately halfway between the Tschingelhorn and the Grosshorn. The Rock-Tower of the Subpeak Kleines Breithorn (3,554 m) is located south of the Main Peak.

The Breithorn is one of two mountains named Breithorn overlooking the Lötschental, the other being the Breithorn (Blatten).

== See also ==
- List of mountains of Switzerland
