= Isenfluh =

Mountain village in Switzerland

- Former municipality
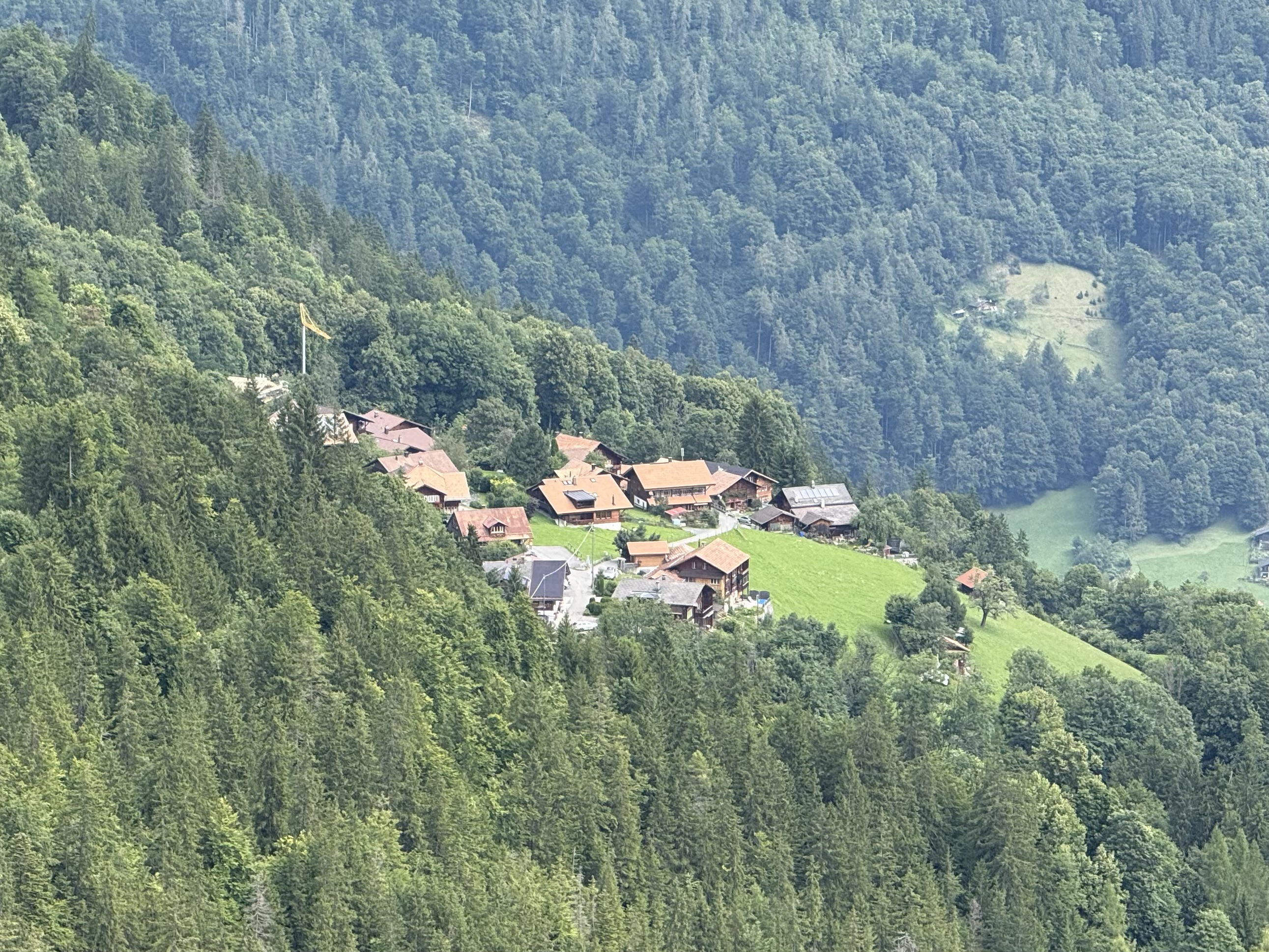
- Isenfluh in 2025

- Flag Coat of arms
- Location of Isenfluh
- Location within Switzerland Location within Canton of Bern
- Country: Switzerland
- Canton: Bern
- District: Interlaken-Oberhasli
- Municipality: Lauterbrunnen

Area
  - Total: 24 km^{2} (9.3 sq mi)
- Elevation: 1,081 m (3,547 ft)

Population (December 2025)
  - Total: 70
  - Density: 2.9/km^{2} (7.6/sq mi)
- Time zone: UTC+01:00 (CET)
  - Summer (DST): UTC+02:00 (CEST)
- Postal code: 3822
- SFOS number: 583
- ISO 3166 code: CH-BE
- Website

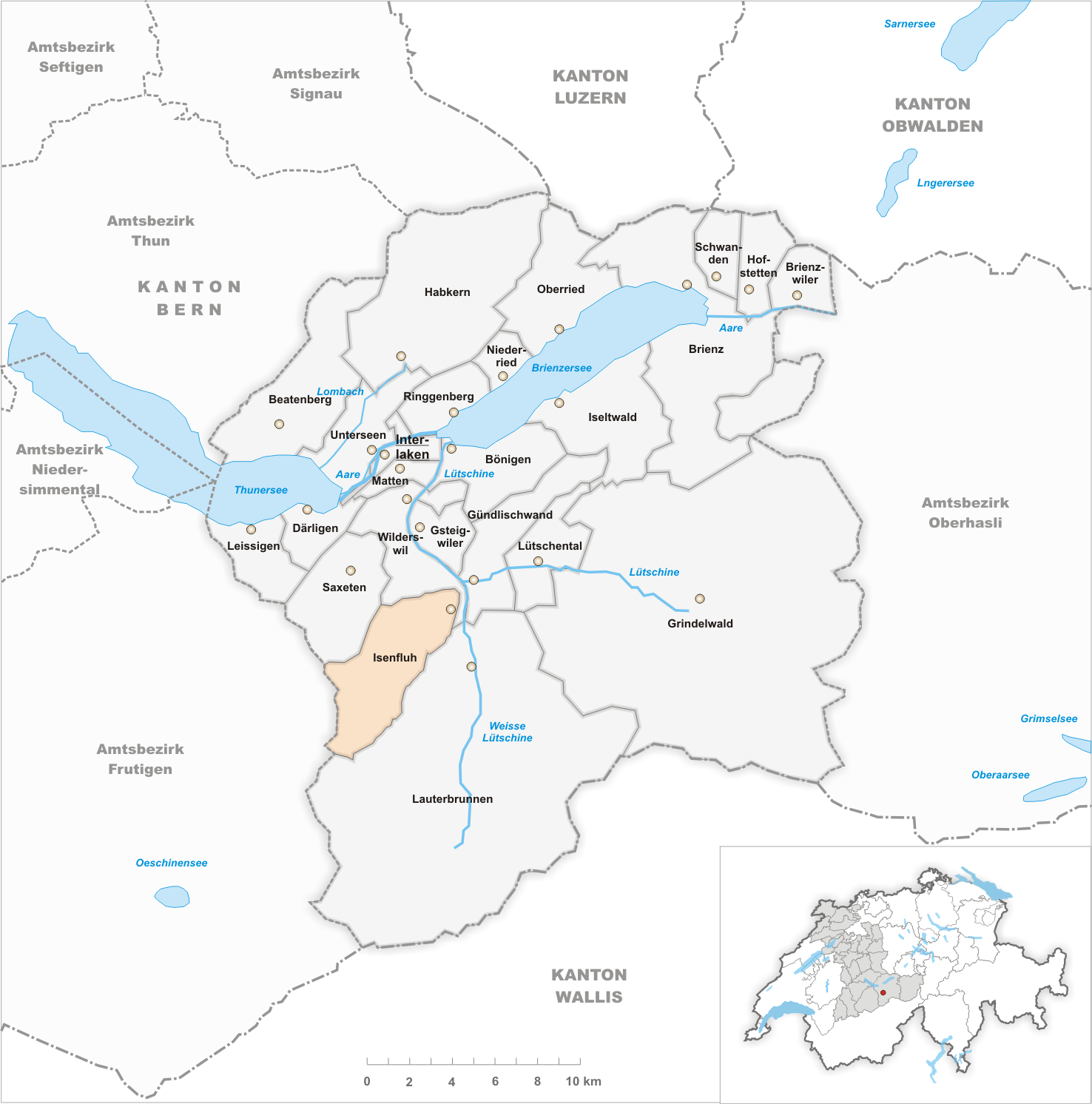
Map of the municipality before the merger with the municipality of Lauterbrunnen on 1 January 1973

Isenfluh (German pronunciation: [ˈiːzn̩ˌfluː]) is a mountain village and former municipality in the Swiss canton of Bern, located in the Bernese Oberland above the road from Wilderswil to Lauterbrunnen. It was first mentioned in 1319 as Ysenfluo and in 1401 people from the Lötschental started to settle in the small village. The village was owned by the Interlaken Monastery from the 14th century until its disestablishment in 1528. Afterwards, Isenfluh was administered by the bailiff of Interlaken until 1798. In 1973, Isenfluh became part of the municipality of Lauterbrunnen.

The infrastructure of Isenfluh is installed, but a lot of the support comes from self-help groups. Since the village school was closed for financial reasons by the government of the Canton of Bern, the children of Isenfluh attend school in Lauterbrunnen.

The main road (and bus route) to Isenfluh traverses a 1,200-metre (0.75 mi) spiral tunnel, the Isenfluhtunnel. This tunnel opened in 1992 and replaced a previous mountain road which was destroyed in a 1987 landslide. The tunnel is one lane wide and has a series of pullouts where traffic can pass.

Isenfluh is a base for hiking and sleigh-rides and ice-climbing. The Lobhorn hut by the Swiss Alpine Club (Schweizer Alpen-Club), SAC, is a few hours away.
