= Ebnefluh =

Mountain in Switzerland

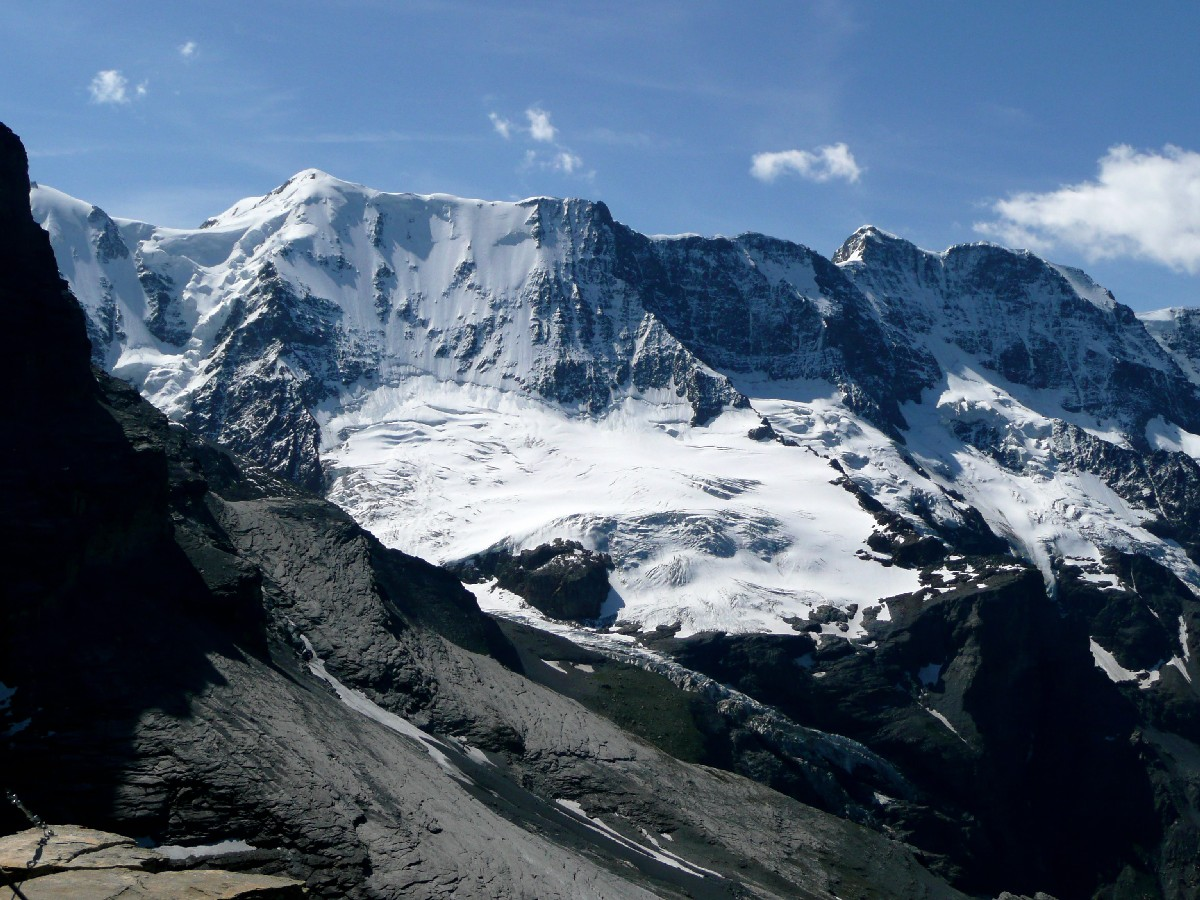
- The Ebnefluh (left-centre) from the north

Highest point
- Elevation: 3,961 m (12,995 ft)
- Prominence: 201 m (659 ft)
- Parent peak: Gletscherhorn
- Coordinates: 46°30′29″N 7°57′11″E

Geography
- Location within Switzerland
- Location: Bern/Valais, Switzerland
- Parent range: Bernese Alps

Climbing
- Easiest route: From Hollandia Hut

The Ebnefluh, also known as the Äbeni Flue and the Ebenefluh, (3,961 m) is a mountain of the Bernese Alps, located on the border between the Swiss cantons of Bern and Valais. It lies towards the eastern end of the Lauterbrunnen Wall.
