= Grosshorn =

Alpine mountain in Switzerland

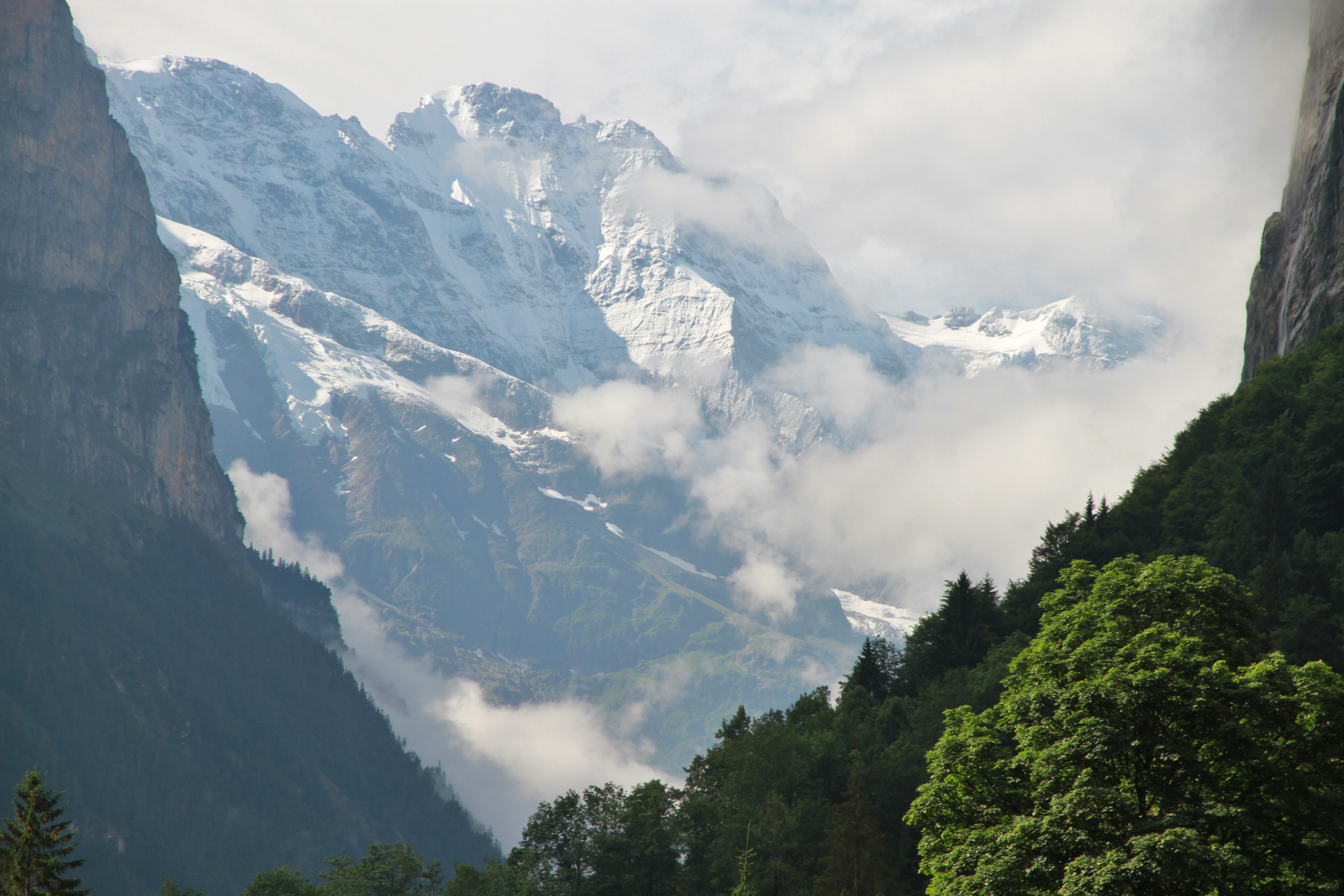
- View from Lauterbrunnen (north side)

Highest point
- Elevation: 3,754 m (12,316 ft)
- Prominence: 194 m (636 ft)
- Parent peak: Jungfrau
- Coordinates: 46°29′11.9″N 7°54′39.2″E

Geography
- Location within Switzerland
- Location: Bern/Valais, Switzerland
- Parent range: Bernese Alps

The Grosshorn is a mountain of the Bernese Alps, located on the border between the Swiss cantons of Bern and Valais. It is situated in the middle of the Lauterbrunnen Wall.

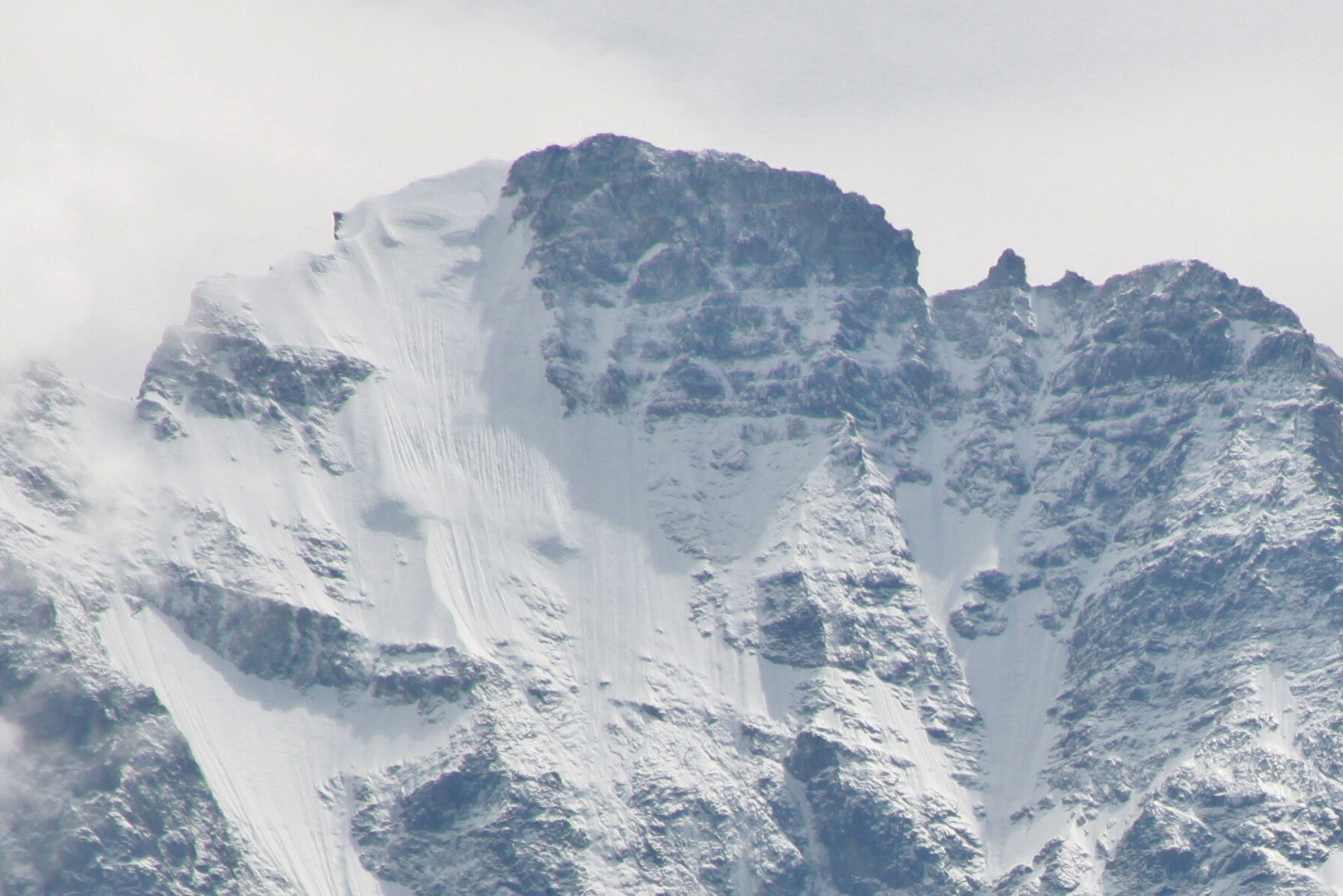
Summit area of the Grosshorn with the prominent West-Ridge-Gendarme (right)
