= Breithorn (Blatten) =

Mountain in Switzerland

- Aerial view of Breithorn

Highest point
- Elevation: 3,785 m (12,418 ft)
- Prominence: 282 m (925 ft)
- Parent peak: Nesthorn
- Coordinates: 46°25′8.2″N 7°53′38.2″E

Naming
- Native name: Breithorn (German)
- English translation: Broad Horn

Geography
- Location within Switzerland
- Country: Switzerland
- Canton: Valais
- Parent range: Bernese Alps
- Topo map: Swisstopo topographic maps

The Breithorn (Swiss Standard German pronunciation: [ˈbraɪthɔrn]; 3,785 m) is a mountain of the Bernese Alps, located east of Blatten in the canton of Valais. It lies between the Bietschhorn and the Schinhorn, on the range separating the Lötschental (valley, north) from the main Rhone valley (south). Its summit is the tripoint between the Lötschental and two other smaller valleys: the Baltschiedertal and the valley of the Beichgletscher.

The Breithorn is one of the two mountains named Breithorn overlooking the Lötschental, the other being the Breithorn (Lauterbrunnen).
