= Rappehorn =

Mountain in Switzerland

- Mittaghorn
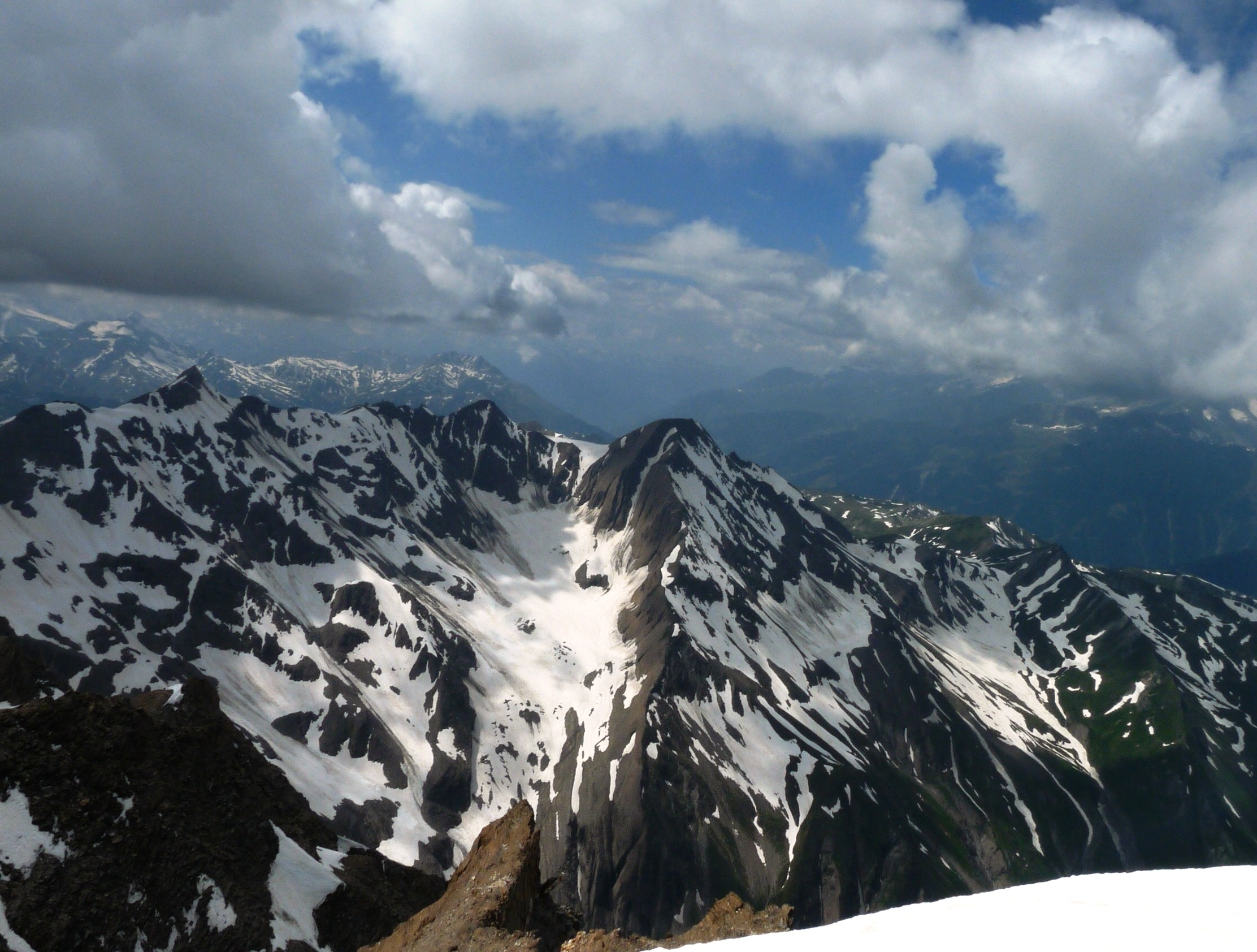
- Rappehorn.

Highest point
- Elevation: 3,158 m (10,361 ft)
- Coordinates: 46°24′53″N 8°16′02″E

Geography
- Location within Switzerland
- Location: Valais, Switzerland
- Parent range: Lepontine Alps

The Rappehorn (also known as Mittaghorn) is a mountain of the Lepontine Alps, located in the canton of Valais, west of the Blinnenhorn.
