= Bietschhorn =

Mountain in Switzerland

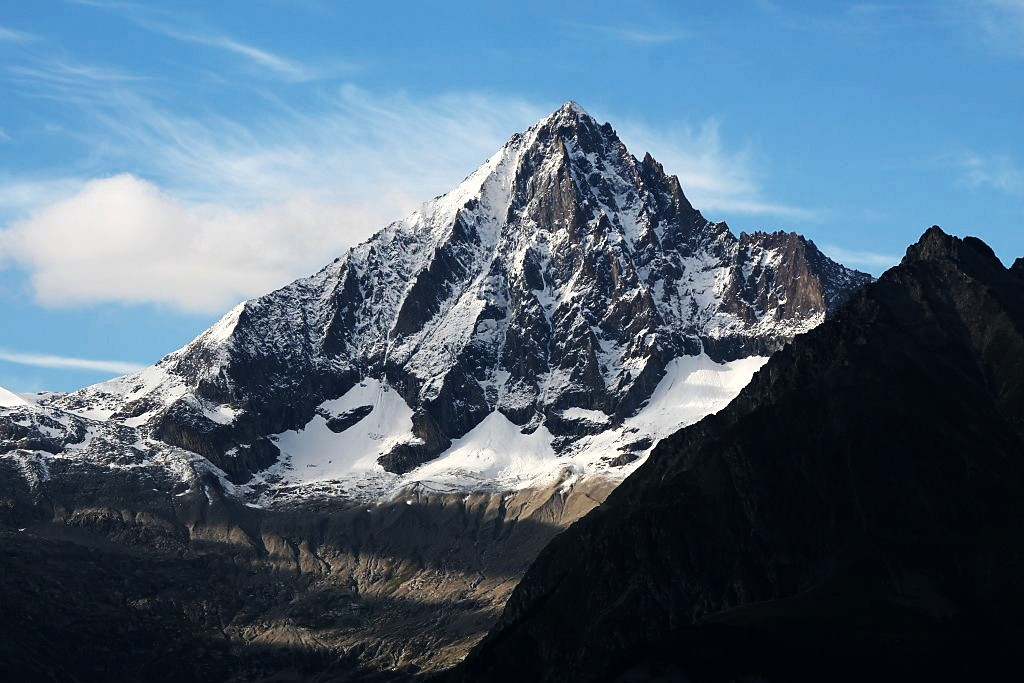
- The south face

Highest point
- Elevation: 3,934 m (12,907 ft)
- Prominence: 807 m (2,648 ft)
- Parent peak: Finsteraarhorn
- Isolation: 13.4 km (8.3 mi)
- Listing: Alpine mountains above 3000 m
- Coordinates: 46°23′28.5″N 7°51′02.7″E

Geography
- Location within Switzerland
- Location: Valais, Switzerland
- Parent range: Bernese Alps

Climbing
- First ascent: 1859 by Leslie Stephen and party

The Bietschhorn (Swiss Standard German pronunciation: [ˈbiːtʃˌhɔrn]; 3,934 m) is a mountain in canton Wallis to the south of the Bernese Alps in Switzerland. The northeast and southern slopes of the mountain are part of the Jungfrau-Aletsch Protected Area (formerly Jungfrau-Aletsch-Bietschhorn) listed as a UNESCO World Heritage Site that also includes the Jungfrau and the Aletsch Glacier. The Bietschhorn is located on the south side of the Lötschental valley and forms part of the UNESCO World Heritage Region at the north end of the Bietschtal valley and Baltschiedertal valley. Most climbers approach the mountain from either the Bietschhornhütte or the Baltschiederklause.

It was first climbed on 13 August 1859 by Leslie Stephen, with guides Anton Siegen, Johann Siegen and Joseph Ebener. An account of some of Stephen's first ascents was published by Leslie Stephen in his book The Playground of Europe (1871). The Bietschhorn ascent however is not mentioned in that classic mountaineering book.

== See also ==
- List of mountains of the Alps above 3000 m
- List of mountains of Valais
- List of mountains of Switzerland
- List of most isolated mountains of Switzerland
