= Lang Glacier =

Glacier in Switzerland

- Langgletscher
- Interactive map of Lang Glacier
- Location: Valais, Switzerland
- Coordinates: 46°27′59″N 7°56′49″E
- Length: 6.6 km (4.1 mi)

The Lang Glacier (German: Langgletscher) is a 6.6 km (4.1 mi) long glacier (2005) situated in the Bernese Alps in the canton of Valais in Switzerland. In 1973 it had an area of 10.1 km^{2} (3.9 sq mi).

== See also ==
- List of glaciers in Switzerland
- List of glaciers
- Retreat of glaciers since 1850
- Swiss Alps
