= Mittaghorn =

Mountain in Switzerland

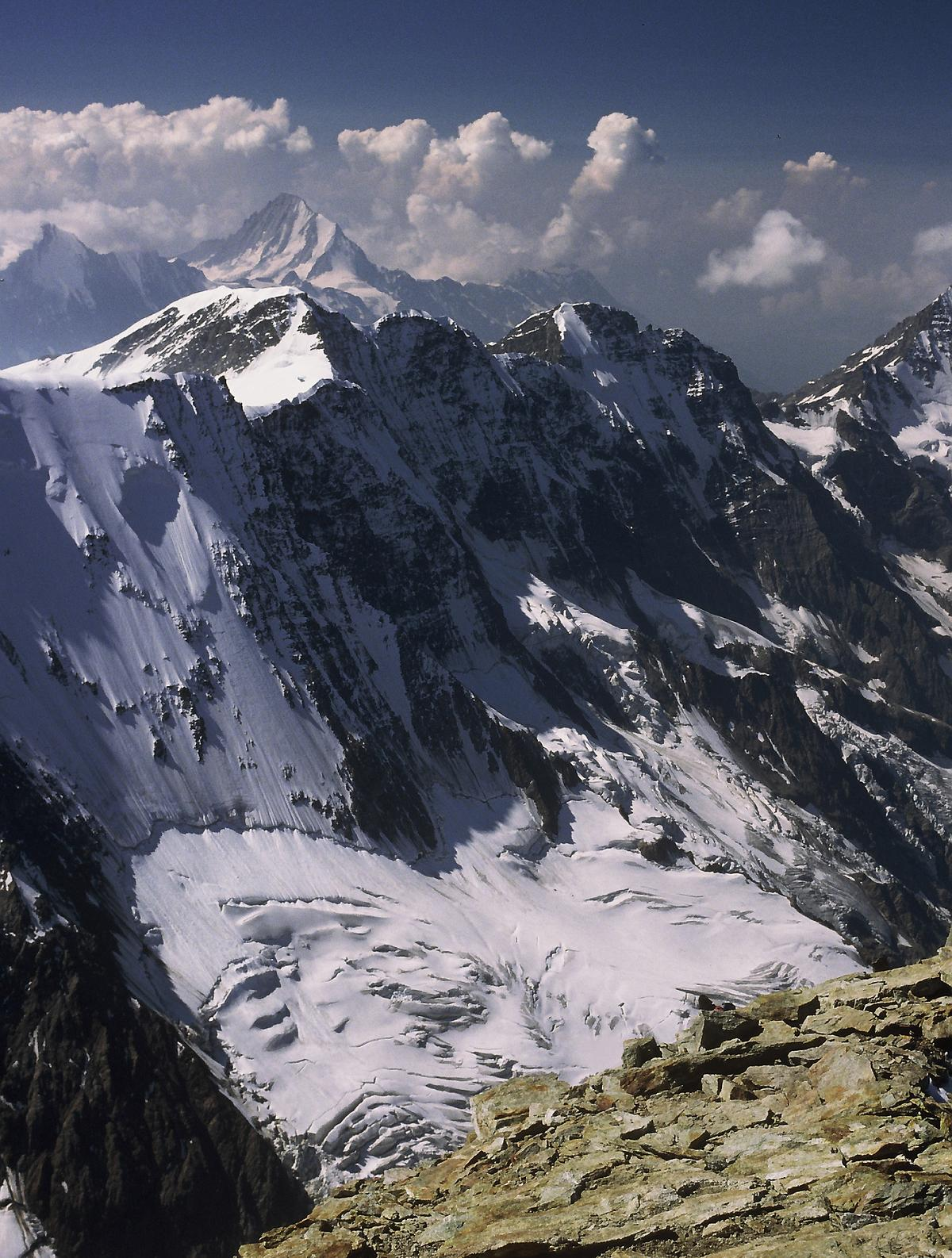
- The northern side of the Mittaghorn (centre-left summit)

Highest point
- Elevation: 3,893 m (12,772 ft)
- Prominence: 197 m (646 ft)
- Parent peak: Gletscherhorn
- Coordinates: 46°29′53.7″N 7°55′57.4″E

Geography
- Location within Switzerland
- Location: Bern/Valais, Switzerland
- Parent range: Bernese Alps

The Mittaghorn is a mountain of the Bernese Alps, located on the border between the cantons of Bern and Valais. It is situated in the middle of the Lauterbrunnen Wall.
