= Gletscherhorn =

Mountain in Switzerland

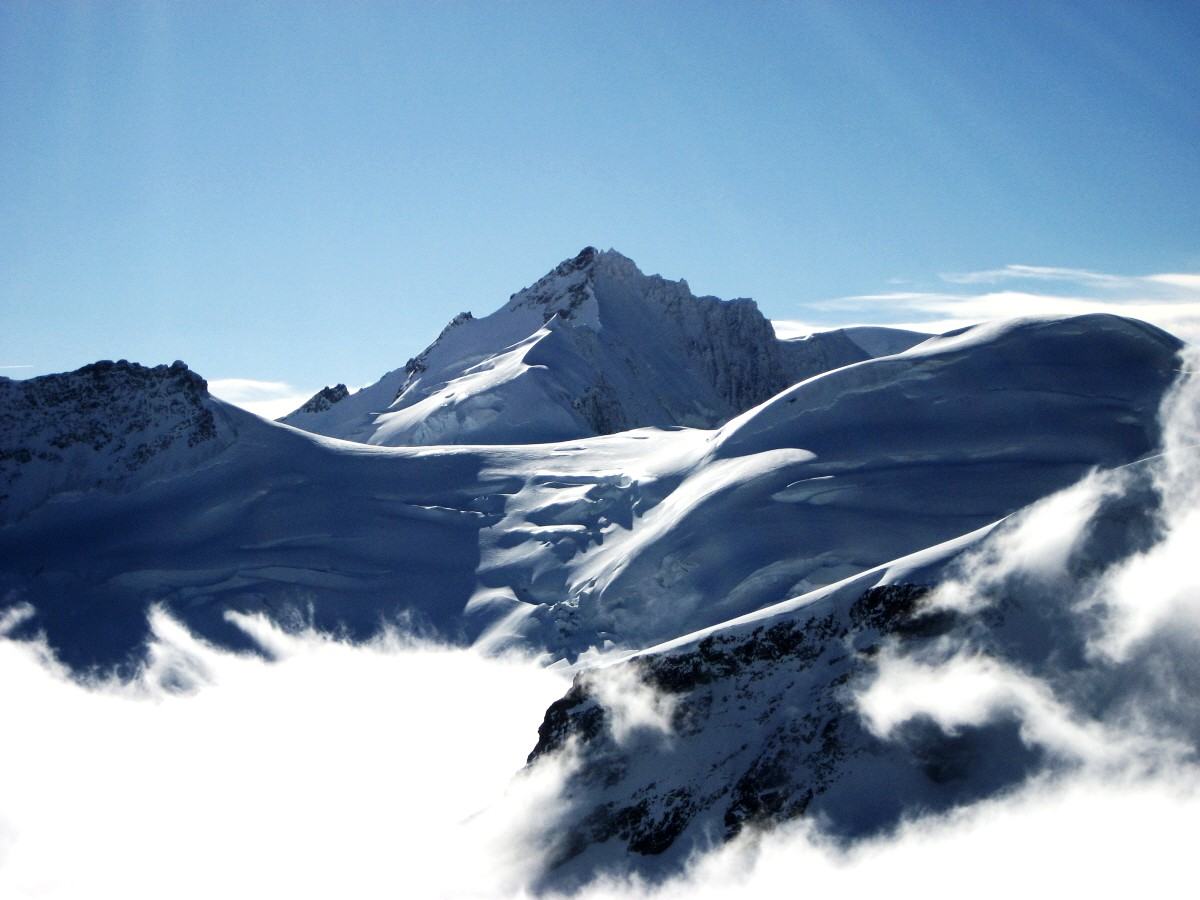
- The Gletscherhorn (background) from the Jungfraujoch (north side)

Highest point
- Elevation: 3,982 m (13,064 ft)
- Prominence: 355 m (1,165 ft)
- Parent peak: Jungfrau
- Listing: Alpine mountains above 3000 m
- Coordinates: 46°30′46″N 7°58′04″E

Geography
- Location within Switzerland
- Location: Bern/Valais, Switzerland
- Parent range: Bernese Alps

The Gletscherhorn (3,982 m) is a mountain of the Bernese Alps, located on the border between the Swiss cantons of Bern and Valais. It forms the eastern edge of the Lauterbrunnen Wall, south of the Jungfrau.

== See also ==
- List of mountains of the Alps above 3000 m
- List of mountains of Switzerland
