= Winteregg railway station =

Railway station in Lauterbrunnen, Switzerland

Winteregg
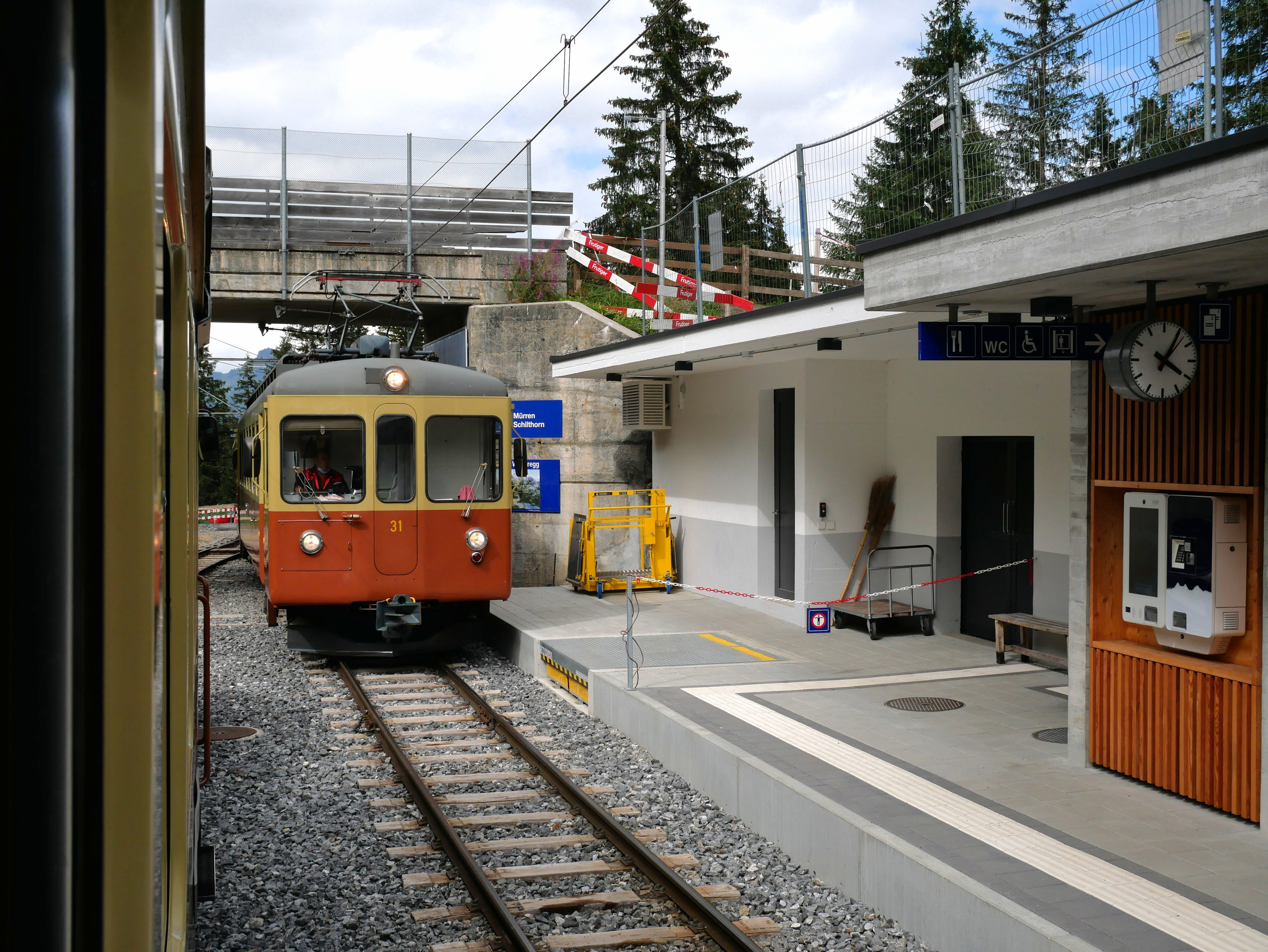
- A BLM train entering the redeveloped Winteregg station

General information
- Location: Winteregg, Lauterbrunnen, Canton of Bern, Switzerland
- Coordinates: 46°34′55″N 7°53′46″E
- Elevation: 1,578 m (5,177 ft)
- Line: Bergbahn Lauterbrunnen-Mürren

Services
Preceding station	Jungfraubahn AG	Following station
Grütschalp towards Lauterbrunnen	Lauterbrunnen–Mürren Mountain Railway	Mürren Terminus
Location
- Location within Switzerland

Winteregg is a railway station on the Bergbahn Lauterbrunnen-Mürren, a hybrid cable car and rail link that connects the villages of Lauterbrunnen and Mürren in the Bernese Oberland region of Switzerland. Winteregg is the point at which trains on the rail link between Lauterbrunnen and Mürren pass.

== Services ==
The station is served by the following passenger trains:

Operator	Route	Typical Frequency	Notes
Bergbahn Lauterbrunnen-Mürren	Lauterbrunnen – Grütschalp – Winteregg – Mürren	2 to 4 per hour	

== Facilities ==
Winteregg station was heavily redeveloped as part of the on-going BLM developments that started in 2021. A new tunnel, passenger building and accessible bathroom facilities were added along with electronic ticket machines on the platforms. The new station is capable of handling the latest rolling stock from Stadler that is replacing the older trains.

Winteregg station also features a large restaurant.

== Aerial cableway ==
Winteregg station features a four-person chairlift constructed in 2009 by Doppelmayr. The chairlift takes five minutes to transport passengers from Wintergg station at 1588m to the top station of Maulerhubel at 1940m. This provides access to the wider Mürren-Schilthorn ski region. Ahead of the 2024 ski season, a further 17 chairs will be added taking the capacity to 1600 skiers per hour.
