= Grütschalp railway station =

Railway station in Switzerland

Grütschalp
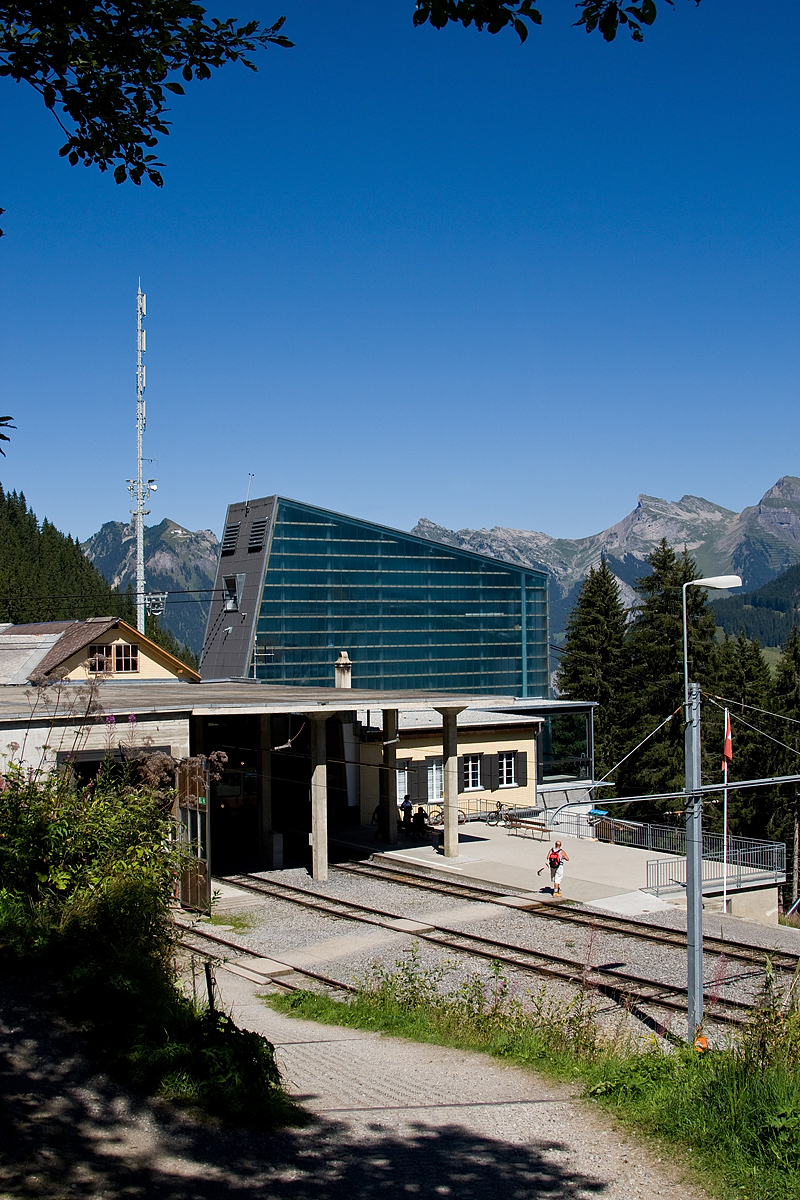
- station (2008)

General information
- Location: Grütschalp; Lauterbrunnen, Bern; Switzerland
- Coordinates: 46.5965°N 7.8909°E
- Elevation: 1,487 m (4,879 ft)
- Line: Bergbahn Lauterbrunnen-Mürren

Services
Preceding station	Jungfraubahn AG	Following station
Lauterbrunnen Terminus	Lauterbrunnen–Mürren Mountain Railway	Winteregg towards Mürren
Location
- Location within Switzerland

Grütschalp is a railway station on the Bergbahn Lauterbrunnen-Mürren, a hybrid cable car and rail link that connects the villages of Lauterbrunnen and Mürren in the Bernese Oberland region of Switzerland. Grütschalp is the point of interchange between the cable car from Lauterbrunnen and the high-level railway from Mürren.

The Lauterbrunnen-Mürren line opened in 1891, but until 2006 the connection between Lauterbrunnen and Grütschalp was affected by Seilbahn Lauterbrunnen–Grütschalp, a funicular railway. The current cable car replaced this when the funicular was damaged by landslides, and uses the same route and adapted terminal stations.

The Lauterbrunnen-Mürren line also handles goods traffic to and from Mürren. This is done by carrying the goods in pallets that are carried under the cable car and on flat cars towed by the railcars. The pallets are transferred between the two by a complicated machine, part fork lift truck and part funicular, within the Grütschalp station complex. The complex also houses the workshops of the line.

The station is served by the following passenger trains:

Operator	Train Type	Route	Typical Frequency	Notes
Bergbahn Lauterbrunnen-Mürren		Lauterbrunnen - Grütschalp - Winteregg - Mürren	2 to 4 per hour	

== Gallery ==
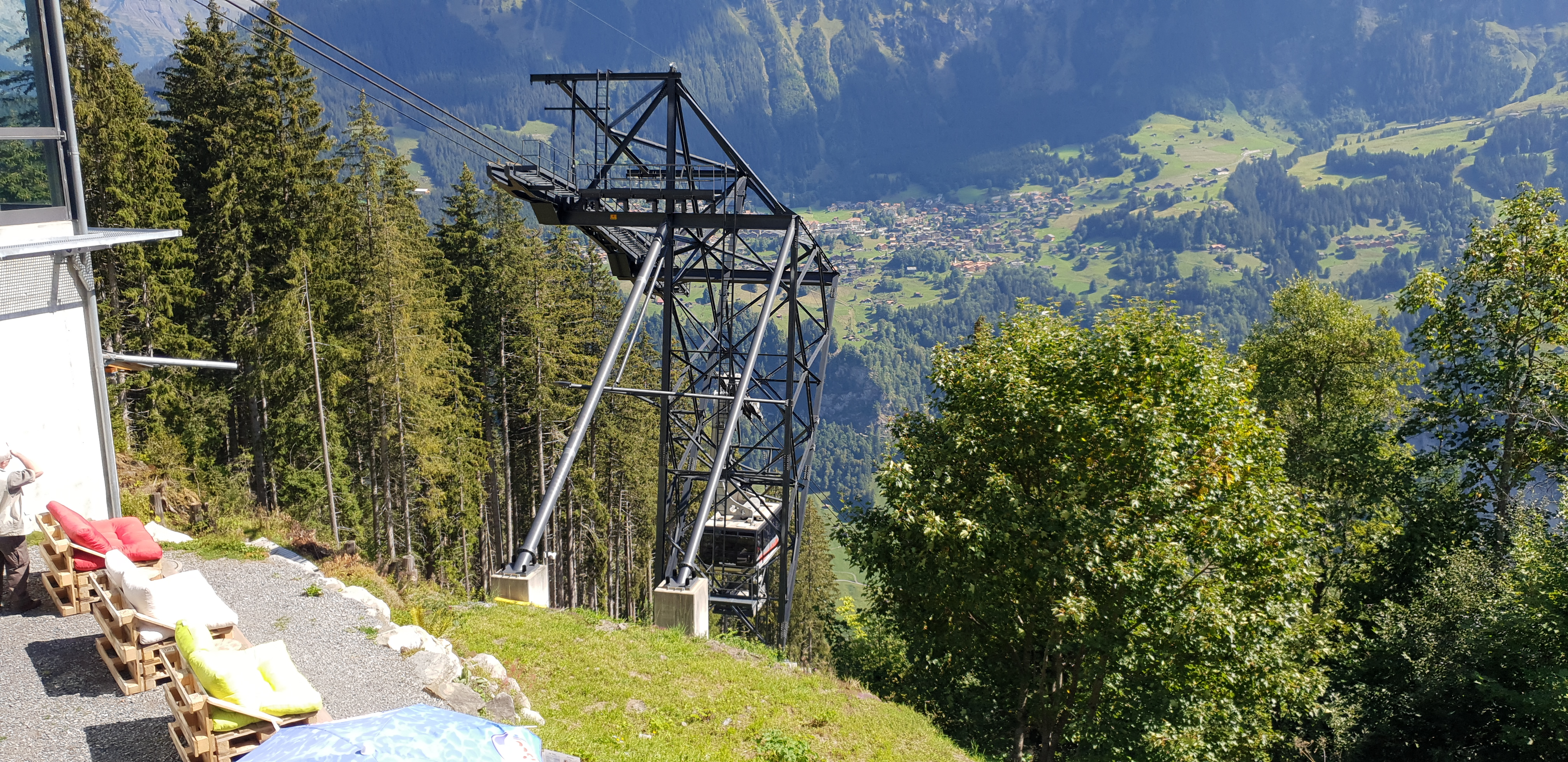
Aerial cablecar at the station (2018)

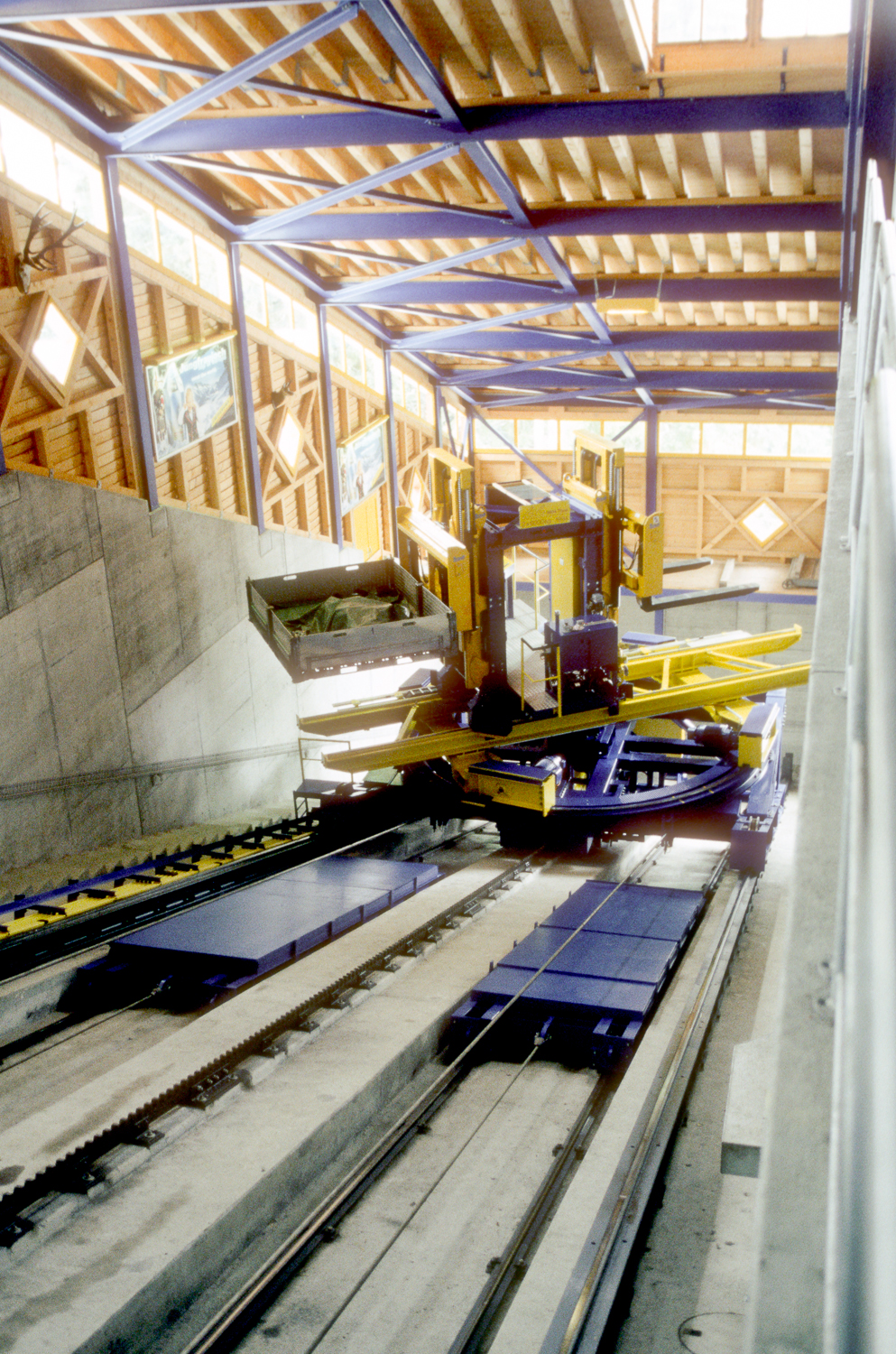
The transfer machinery (2012)

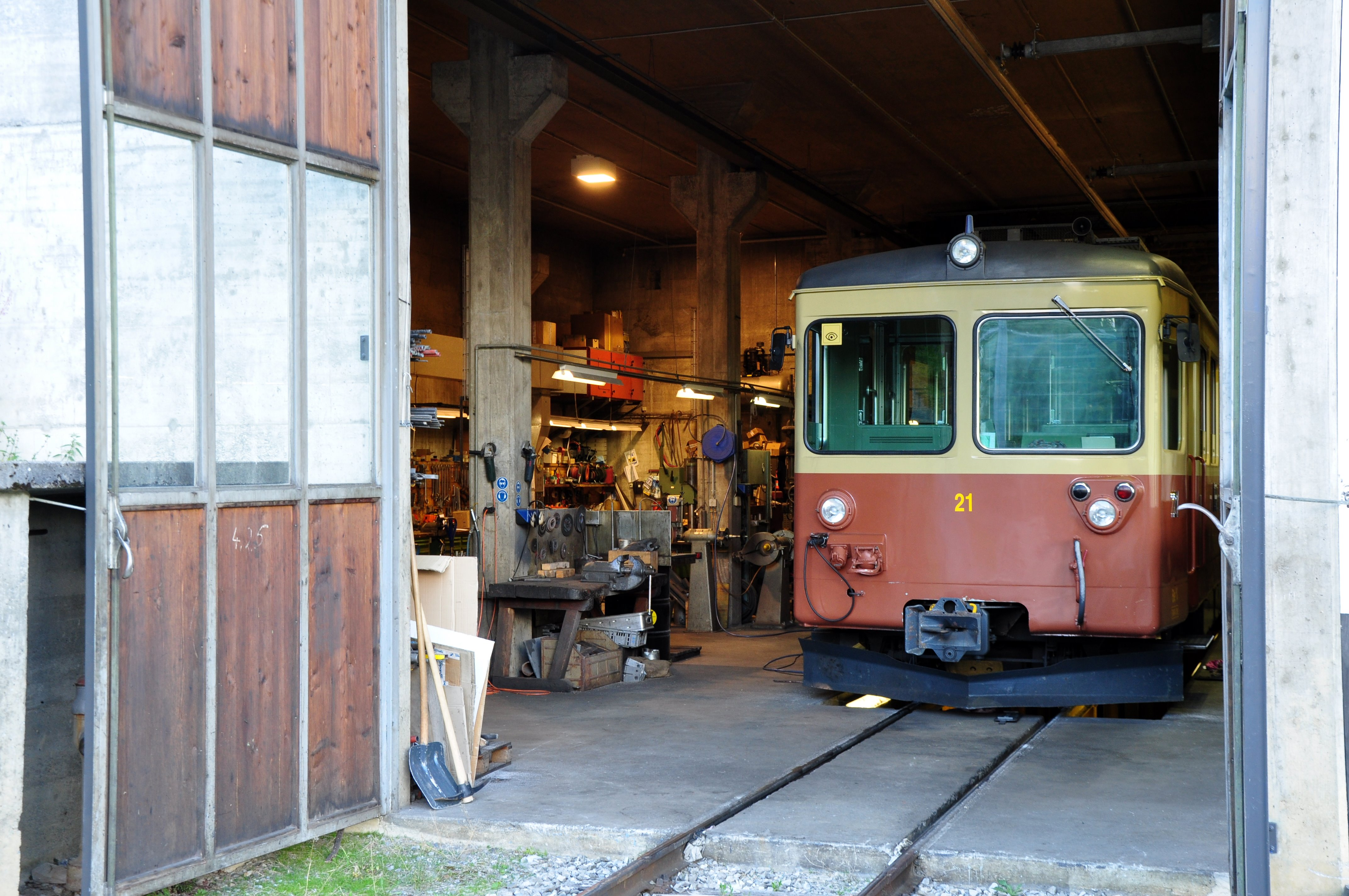
Car in the workshops (2009)

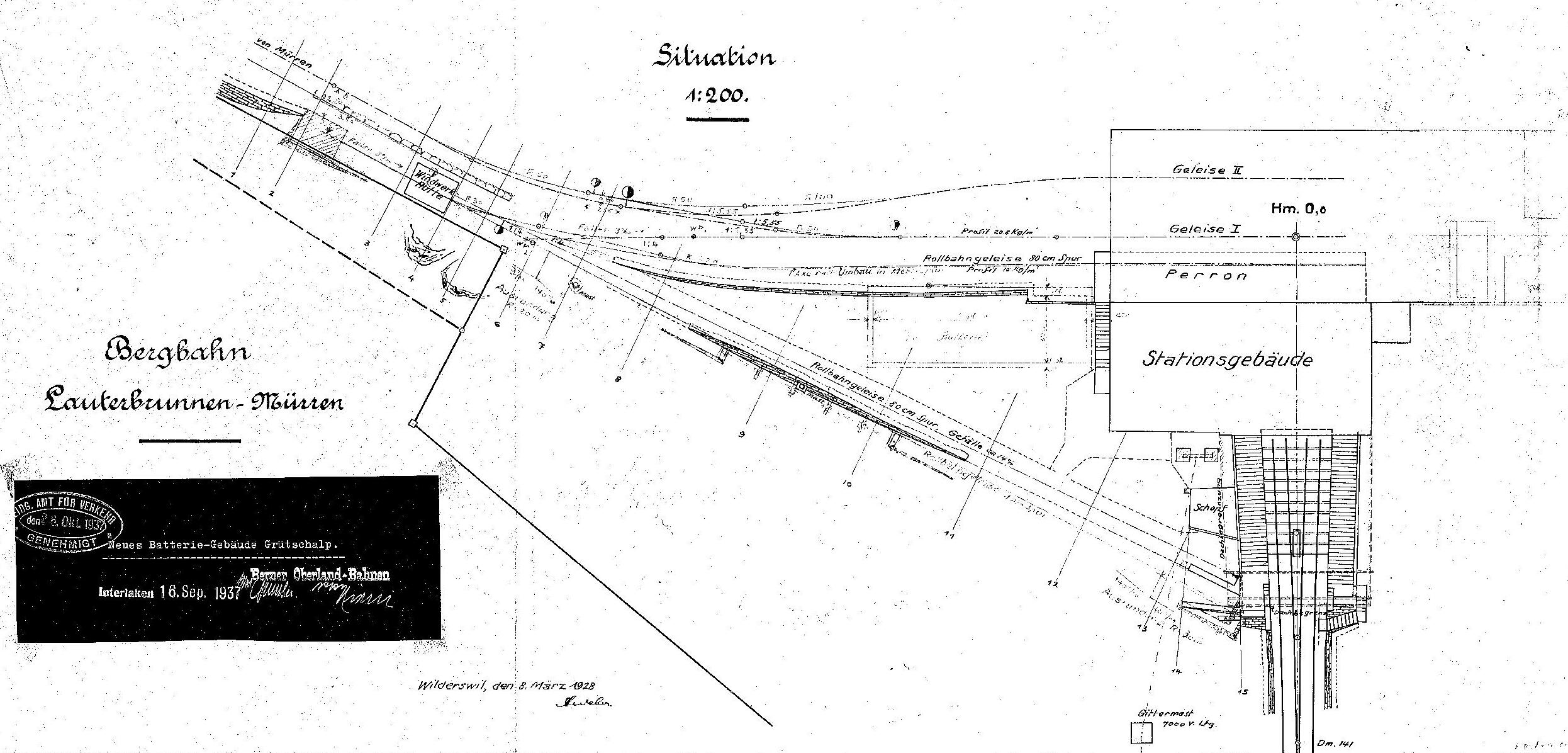
Map (1928)
