= Lauterbrunnen–Mürren Mountain Railway =

Transport system in the Bernese Oberland area of Switzerland

Coordinates: 46.5839°N 7.8954°E

Lauterbrunnen-Mürren Mountain Railway
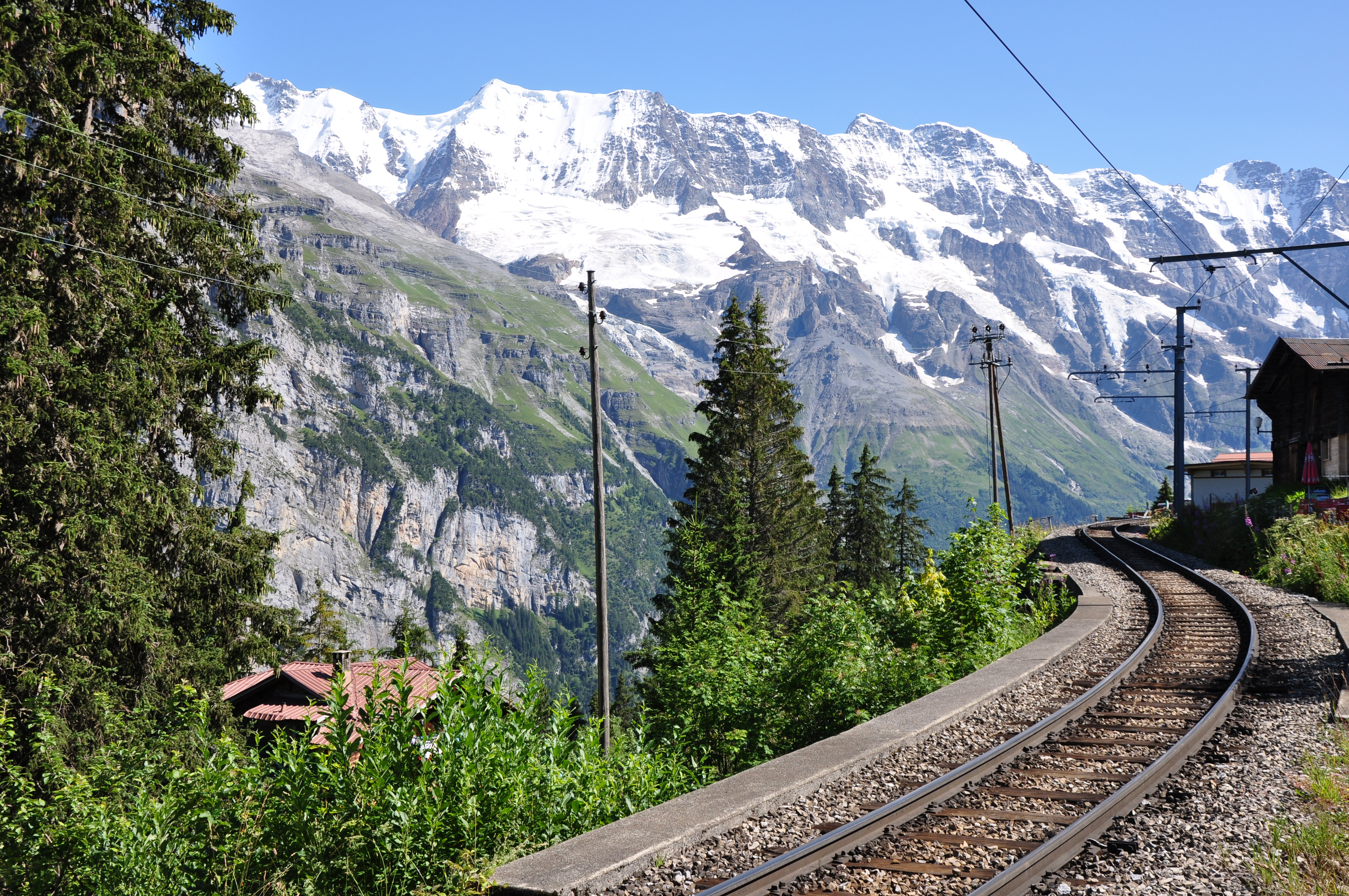

Overview
- Other names: Mürrenbahn, Grütschalpbahn
- Native name: Bergbahn Lauterbrunnen–Mürren BLM
- Status: operating daily with brief maintenance breaks in spring and late autumn
- Owner: Bergbahn Lauterbrunnen-Mürren AG
- Locale: Bernese Oberland
- Termini: Lauterbrunnen; Mürren
- Stations: 4 (including Grütschalp and Winteregg)
- Website: BLM

Service
- Type: mountain railway and aerial cableway (funicular before 2006)
- Services: 1
- Operator(s): BLM

History
- Opened: 14 August 1891 (134 years ago)
- Aerial cableway: 2006 (replacing funicular)

Technical
- Line length: 1.4 km (0.87 mi) (aerial cableway); 4.27 km (2.65 mi) (railway)
- Number of tracks: Single track with one passing loop
- Character: Small commuter, but mainly touristic mountain rail-/cableway
- Track gauge: 1,000 mm (3 ft 3 3/8 in) metre gauge
- Electrification: 550 V DC, Overhead line
- Highest elevation: 1,638 m (5,374 ft)
- Maximum incline: 5%

The Lauterbrunnen–Mürren Mountain Railway (German: Bergbahn Lauterbrunnen–Mürren, BLM, also known as Mürrenbahn) is a hybrid transport system in the Bernese Oberland area of Switzerland, which connects the villages of Lauterbrunnen and Mürren. The system consists of a connected aerial cableway, also known as the Grütschalpbahn, and an adhesion worked mountain railway. The cableway replaced a funicular, on the same route, in 2010.

The line provides a vital passenger and goods link to the resort village of Mürren, which is situated above the cliffs of the Lauterbrunnen Valley and has poor road access. It also commands a view of the Eiger, Mönch and Jungfrau mountains across the depths of that valley.

The line is owned by the Bergbahn Lauterbrunnen-Mürren AG, a subsidiary of the Jungfraubahn Holding AG, a holding company that also owns the Wengernalpbahn, Jungfraubahn, Harderbahn, and Firstbahn. Through that holding company it is part of the Allianz - Jungfrau Top of Europe marketing alliance, which also includes the separately owned Berner Oberland-Bahn and Schynige Platte-Bahn.

== History ==
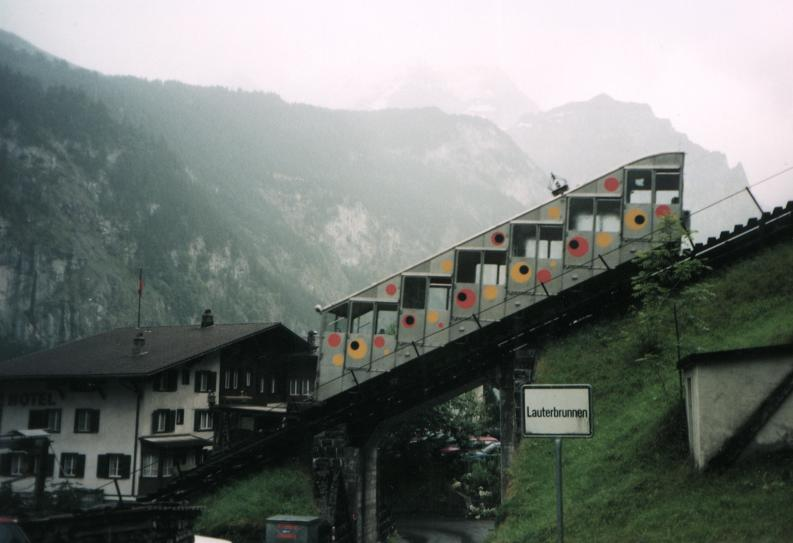
The former funicular above Lauterbrunnen

The key milestones in the history of the line are:

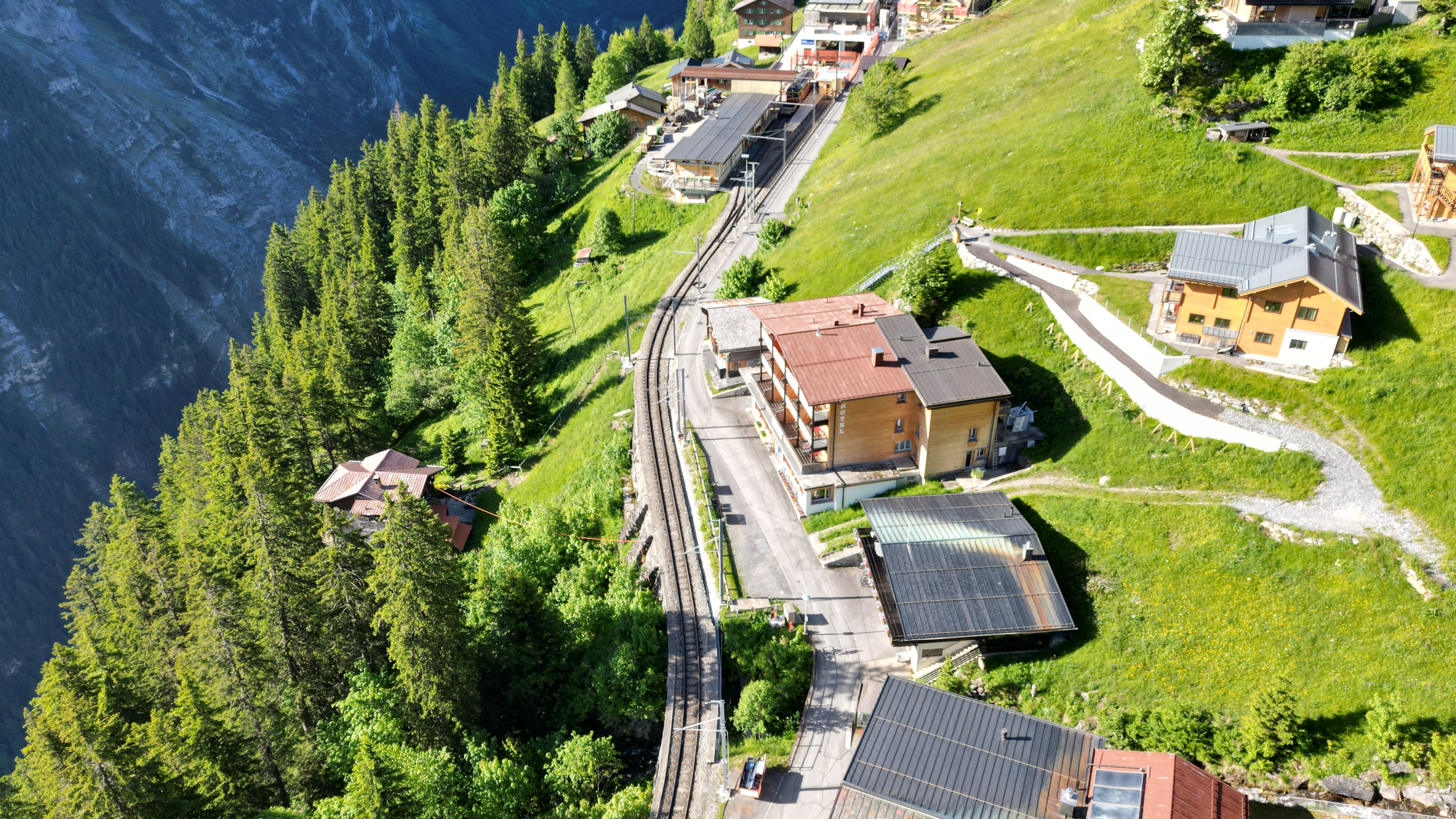
Murren railway station from above 120622

- 1887 Concession obtained for the construction of the railways.
- 1889 The company is formed and construction starts.
- 1891 Railway opens. The planned opening on 1 June is delayed until 14 August due to a derailment.
- 1902 The funicular railway is converted from water gravity power to electric power .
- 1910 First winter operations started.
- 1912 Replacement of the locomotives on the Mürren to Grütschalp section by motor coaches (type BDe 2/4).
- 1949 New vehicles and rope are installed on the Lauterbrunnen to Grütschalp section.
- 1965 The new station at Mürren is opened.
- 1994 The freight loading operations at Grütschalp are rebuilt.
- 2006 Last operation of the funicular from Lauterbrunnen to Grütschalp was on 23 April and the first operation of the replacement cable car was on 16 December.

== Operation ==
=== Route ===
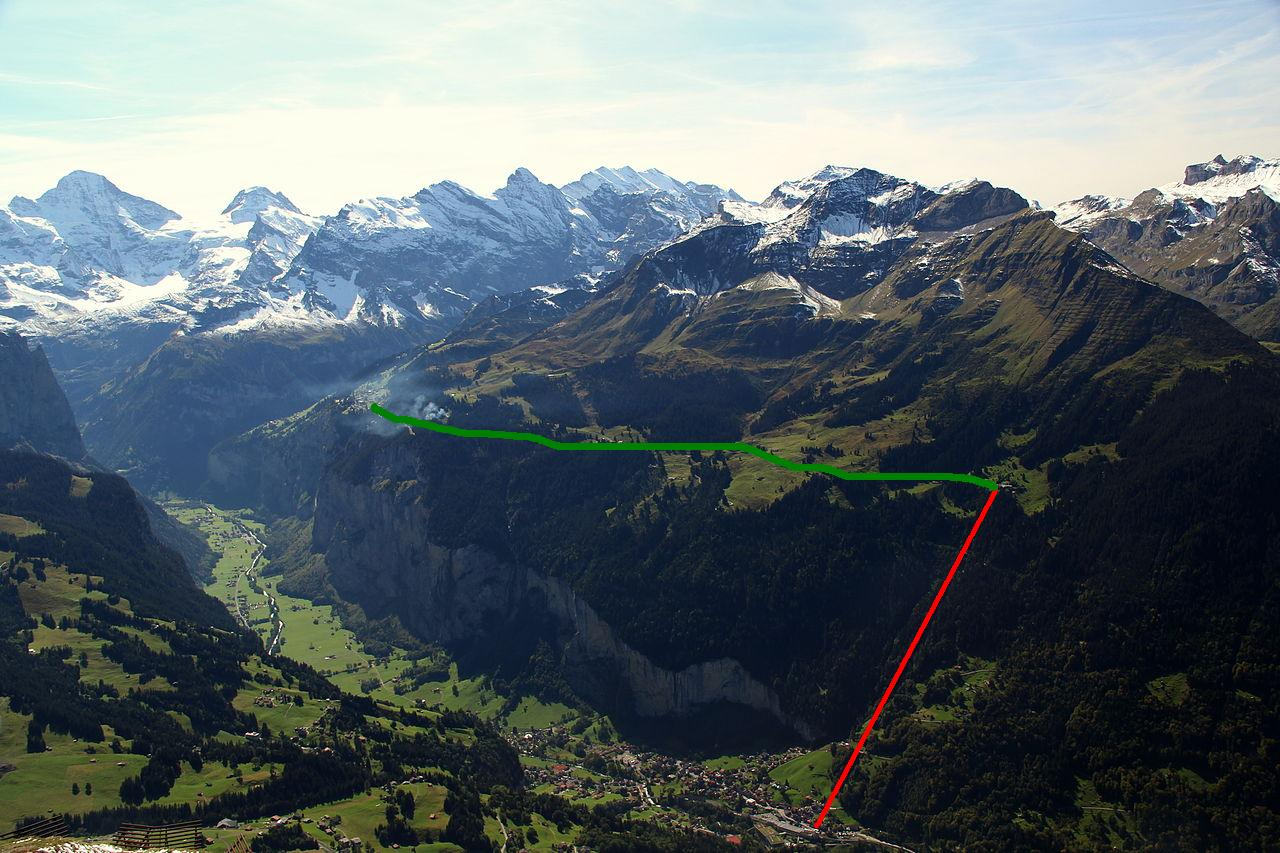
Route of the BLM above the Lauterbrunnen valley, with the cablecar section in red and the rail section in green

The BLM commences from Lauterbrunnen, using a terminus that is directly opposite the platforms of the Berner Oberland-Bahn (BOB) to Interlaken, and the Wengernalpbahn (WAB) to Kleine Scheidegg and Grindelwald. The first section of the line is an aerial cableway that rises 690 m (2,263.8 ft) in a distance of 1.4 km (0.9 mi). The cableway follows the line of the funicular that preceded it, and the remains of the funicular are visible at many points.

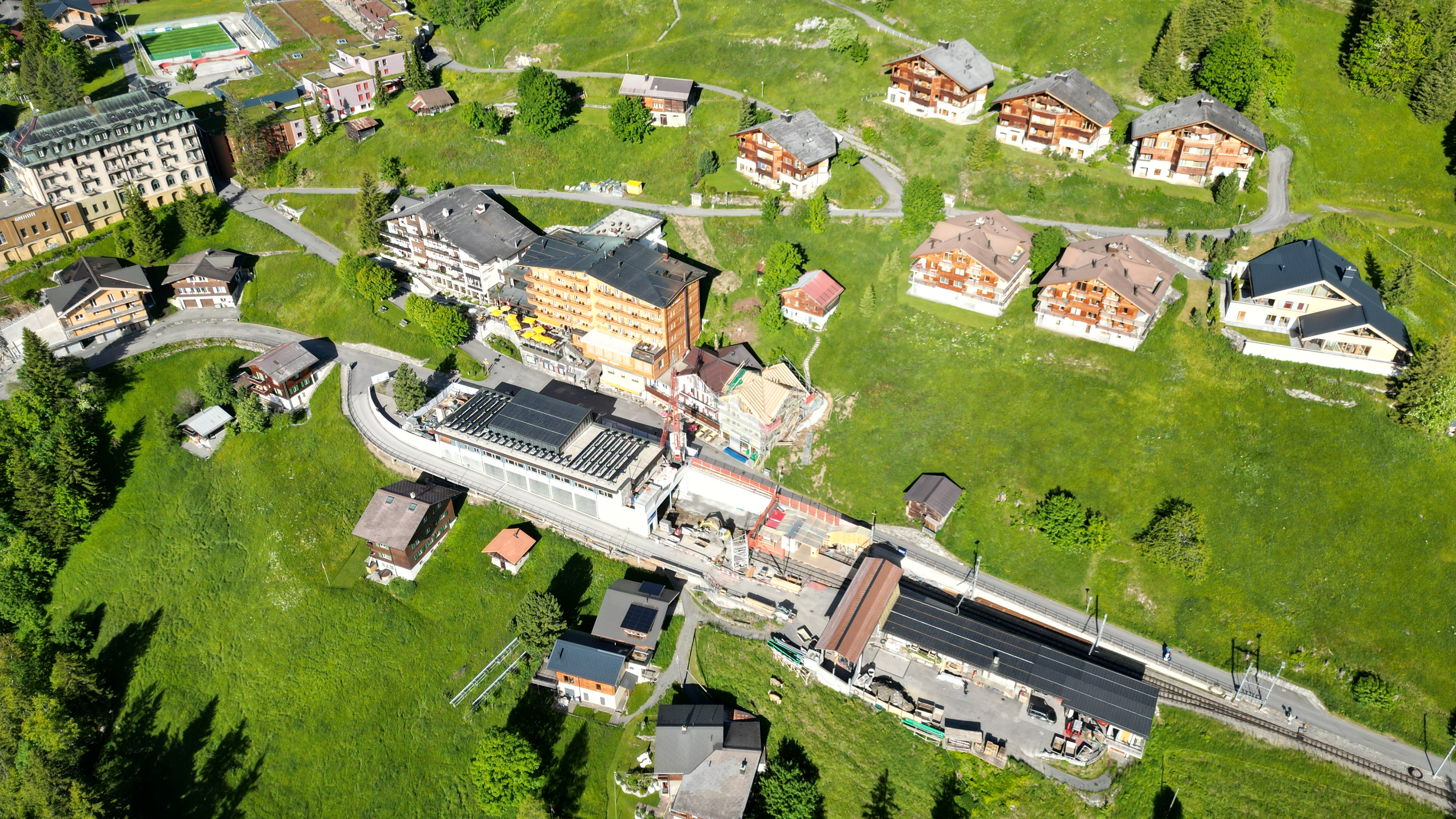
Murren railway station from above 120622

The aerial cableway and railway connect at Grütschalp station, where both lines are within a single building, which also contains the line's workshop. A complex transfer machine in the station is used to transfer goods between the two sections and is well used since road access to Mürren is virtually impossible. The same machine was used to transfer goods between the funicular and rail, and has been retained for use with the cable car.

From Grütschalp to Mürren the line is continued as a 4.27 km (2.7 mi) long narrow gauge electric railway, which rises 152 m (498.7 ft). Through most of its length, the rail line commands a view of the Eiger, Mönch and Jungfrau across the depths of the Lauterbrunnen Valley. The railway has a single intermediate calling point, at Winteregg station, and runs to a terminus at Mürren station, where the platforms used by passengers are enclosed within a modern station building. Just before the station is reached, the line passes a large freight depot, used in the carriage of freight to Mürren.

=== Cable car ===
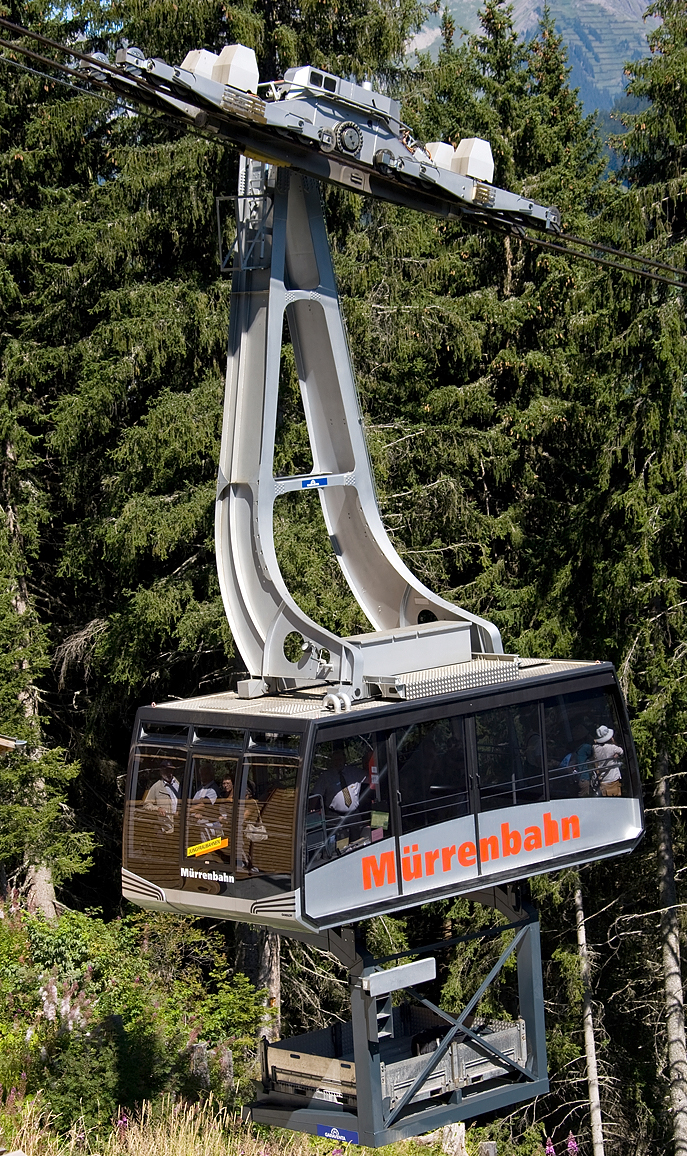
The cablecar that replaced the funicular

The cable car section of the line is operated by a single cable car, which shuttles between Lauterbrunnen and Grütschalp with a journey time of 4 minutes. The car has an upper passenger level, carrying up to 100 passengers, and a lower level capable of carrying 6 tonnes (5.9 long tons; 6.6 short tons) of freight. The cable car is scheduled with the railway to provide a through journey frequency of between two and four services per hour.

=== Rail infrastructure ===
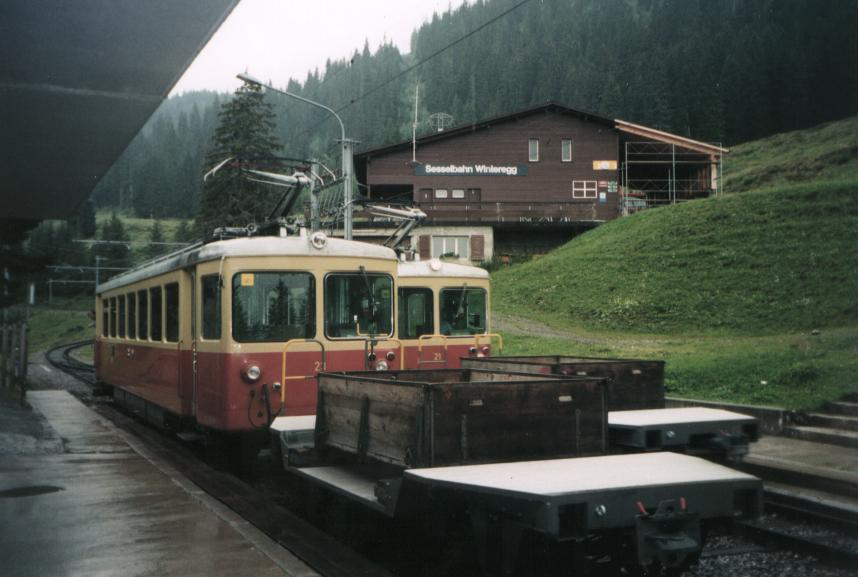
Two trains pass in Winteregg station

The rail line is single-track, with a passing loop at Winteregg station. It has a track gauge of 1,000 mm (3 ft 3 3/8 in) and is electrified at 550 V DC supplied by overhead line. The line is operated using rail adhesion only, and has a maximum gradient of 5%. The former funicular shared the same track gauge, enabling the use of the funicular to transfer rolling stock to and from the electric railway.

The rail section is operated by single electric railcars, often towing or pushing a flat car for goods, with a journey time of 14 minutes. The railway is scheduled with the cable car to provide a through journey frequency of between two and four services per hour.

=== Rail vehicles ===
In order to meet legislative requirement for disabled access, the fleet of trains has been replaced recently with modern low-floor vehicles. In September 2019 it was announced that Jungfraubahn Holding AG had awarded Stadler Rail at Bussnang a contract to supply three trainsets for at a cost of 17.3m Swiss francs. In addition, Mürren railway station, other stations and the Grütschalp workshop were modernised. The first car of the three trainsets was delivered in November 2023, and the second on 13 May 2024.

The list of rail vehicles as at August 2025.

Image	Numbers	Notation	Year	Notes
	101-103	Be 4/6	2024	Low floor multiple unit. Built by Stadler Rail at Bussnang
	17-19	LKip	2023	Low floor trailer cars. Built by Nencki
	27	X	1994	Snow plough. Built by Zaugg AG Eggiwil
	95	LM	2016	Ladder trolley. Built by Sutter, Lungern

=== Former Rail vehicles ===
Image	Numbers	Notation	Year	Notes
	11	BDe 2/4	1913	Built for the BLM by SIG/MFO. Used on occasional special services.
	21-23	BDe 4/4	1967	Built for the BLM by SIG/BBC/SAAS to replace the 1913 built stock.
	31	BDe 4/4	1967	Built by BBC/MFO for the OJB where it was numbered 82. It was acquired and rebuilt for use on the BLM in 2010.
	25	X rot m	1956	Diesel snow blower.

In addition there were four low-floor flat cars, which are pushed or pulled by the passenger cars and carry demountable bodies that can be transferred to the cable car, and a number of unpowered works vehicles.

== See also ==
- List of funicular railways
- List of funiculars in Switzerland
