= Seilbahn Lauterbrunnen–Grütschalp =

Former funicular railway in the Bernese Oberland, Switzerland

Seilbahn Lauterbrunnen-Grütschalp
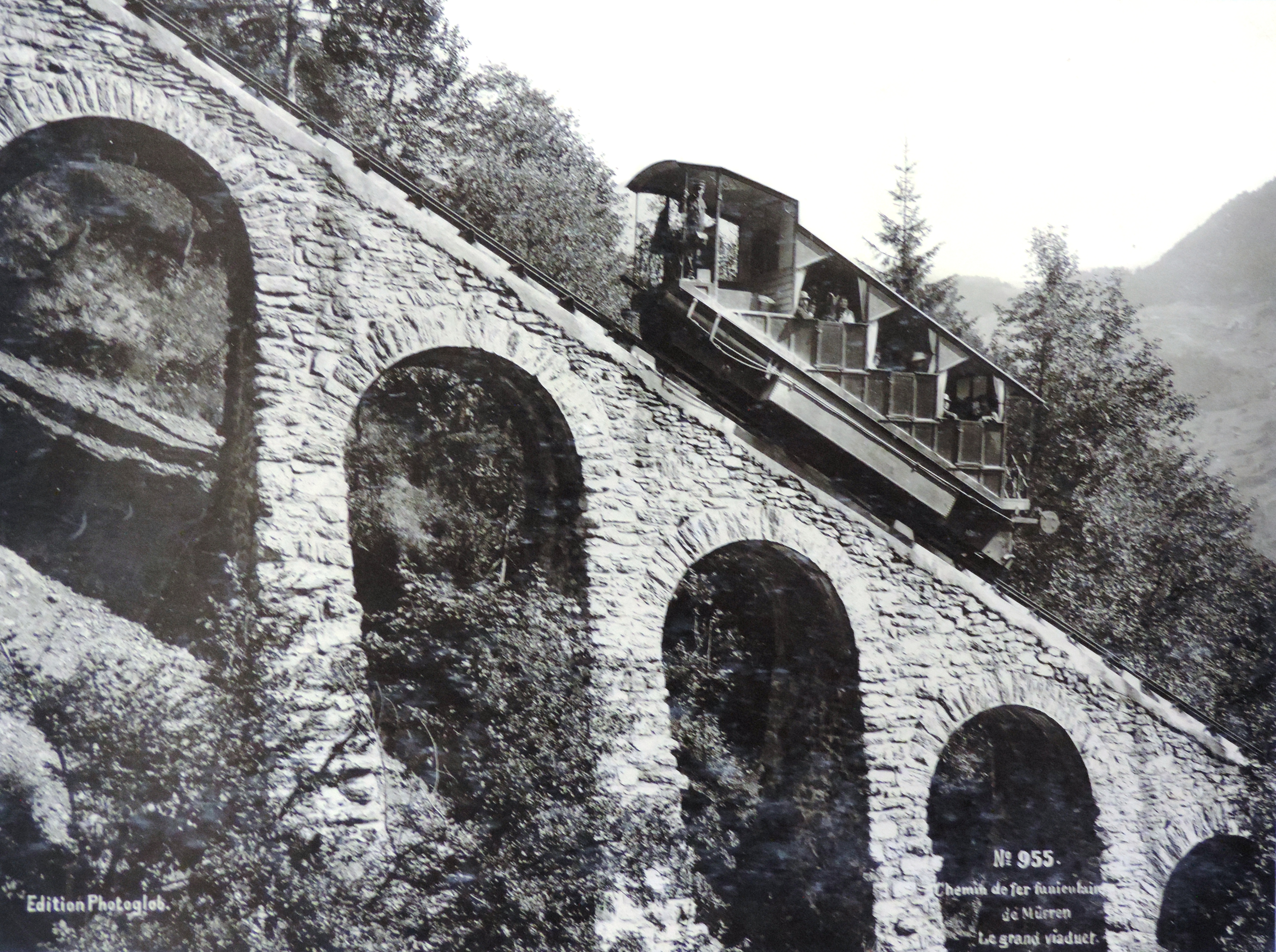
- Original car on grand viaduct (before 1893)

Overview
- Other name(s): Seilbahn Lauterbrunnen-Grütsch
- Status: Ceased operation
- Owner: Bergbahn Lauterbrunnen-Mürren AG
- Locale: Bernese Oberland, Switzerland
- Termini: Lauterbrunnen; Grütschalp
- Connecting lines: Grütschalp–Mürren, Bernese Oberland line
- Stations: 2

Service
- Type: Funicular
- Route number: 313
- Rolling stock: 2

History
- Opened: 14 August 1891
- Concession: 1887
- Electrification, extension: 1 June 1902
- Removal of rack rail: 1949
- Closed: 23 April 2006

Technical
- Line length: 1,372 m (4,501 ft)
- Number of tracks: 1 with passing loop
- Rack system: 1891 - 1949: Riggenbach
- Track gauge: 1,000 mm (3 ft 3 3/8 in)
- Electrification: 1902
- Maximum incline: 60%

Opened in 1891, the Seilbahn Lauterbrunnen–Grütschalp was a 1.4 km (Note: Stated length varies: 1392 m, 1372 m, 1380 m) long funicular railway between Lauterbrunnen and Grütschalp in the Bernese Oberland, Switzerland. From Grütschalp, the Lauterbrunnen–Mürren mountain railway continues to Mürren. The line had a difference of elevation of 674m at an incline of 41-60%. (Note: Stated difference of elevation varies: 674 m, 671 m, 670 m) The longest viaduct on the line was 220m. The funicular closed on 23 April 2006, and was replaced by an aerial cablecar in December 2006.

== Water-counterbalanced line (1891 - 1902) ==
From line's opening in 1891 until 1902, the line was water powered. The downward car on each trip would be filled with 7m³ of water, sourced from the Staubbach, which counterbalanced the weight of the upward car. During this period, the track had three rails except at the upper station where there were four.

The rope, manufactured by Felten & Guillaume, had a diameter of 32.6mm and consisted of 125 wires of 26.3mm diameter externally and 72 wires of 1.3mm diameter internally. It had a breaking strength of 62,000 kg and a weight of 3.5 kg/m. By 1892 it had run approximately 5000 km and stretched by 15m in length.

== Electrified line (1902 - 2006) ==
In 1902, Swiss Locomotive and Machine Works and Joh. Jakob Rieter electrified the line and replaced the cars and cable. A power plant was built at Staubbach, 1.35 km from the upper station. The new cars had 6 compartments for 62 passengers including 54 seats, floor set to be horizontal at 52% incline, 2 axles and total weight of 7950 kg.

In 1949, the Riggenbach rack was removed and the track changed from 3 to 2 rails. The 34 mm cable laid in 1935 was replaced. The new cable was 1,600m long, 42 mm in diameter, weighed 10 tons and cost CHF 26,000. Two new cars were provided which were capable of carrying 70 people (8 more than the previous cars) and included a trailer for goods. The replacement of the Riggenbach rack with wedge shaped rails reduced the journey time from 20 to 11 minutes.

The rope, also manufactured by Felten & Guillaume, had a diameter of 33.6mm and consisted of 6 stands of 16 wires each (7 wires 1.85mm in diameter, and 9 of 2.65mm diameter) around a fiber core. It had a breaking strength of 63,000 kg and a weight of 3.75 kg/m.

== Gallery ==
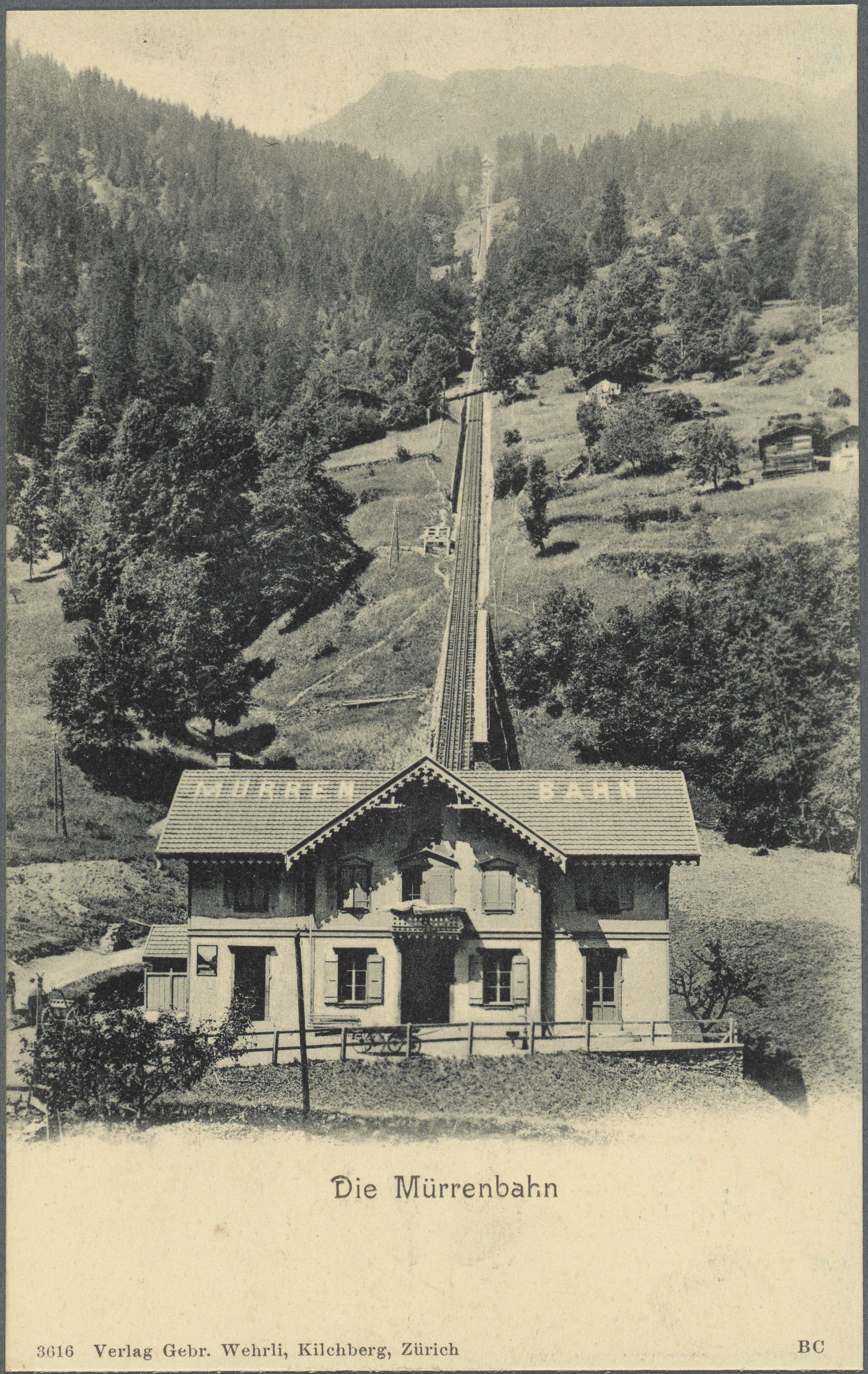
Lauterbrunnen station and tracks

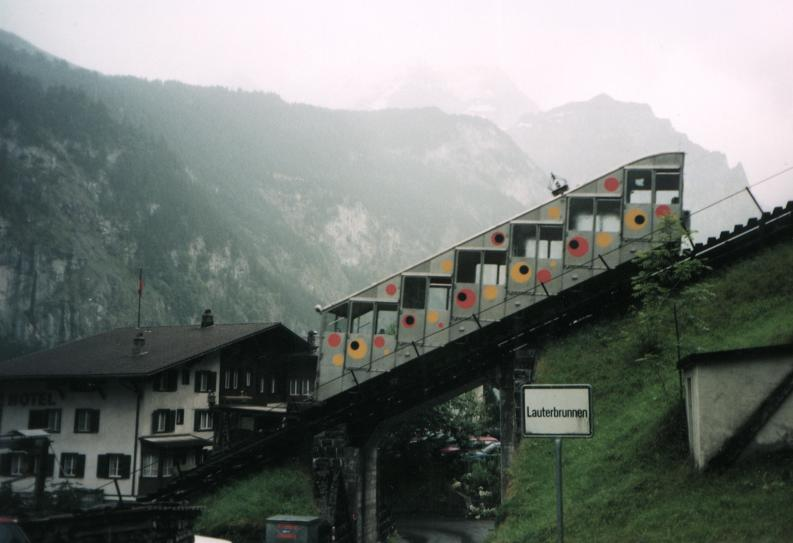
Funicular at Lauterbrunnen in its final years
