= Mürren railway station =

Railway station in canton of Bern, Switzerland

Mürren
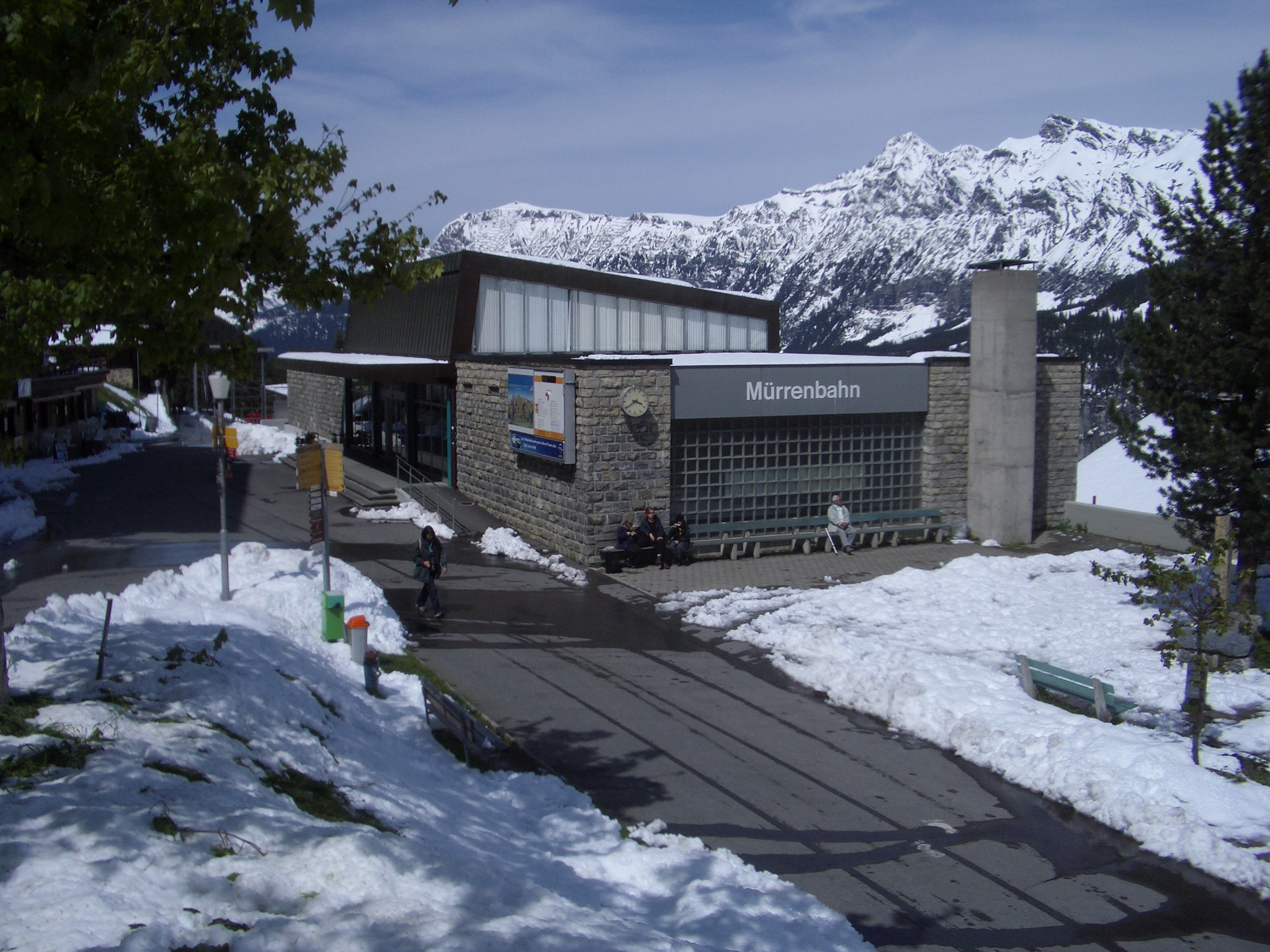

General information
- Location: 3825 Mürren; Lauterbrunnen, Bern; Switzerland
- Coordinates: 46.563825°N 7.897314°E
- Elevation: 1,639 m (5,377 ft)
- Line: Bergbahn Lauterbrunnen-Mürren

Services
Preceding station	Jungfraubahn AG	Following station
Winteregg towards Lauterbrunnen	Lauterbrunnen–Mürren Mountain Railway	Terminus
Location
- Location within Switzerland

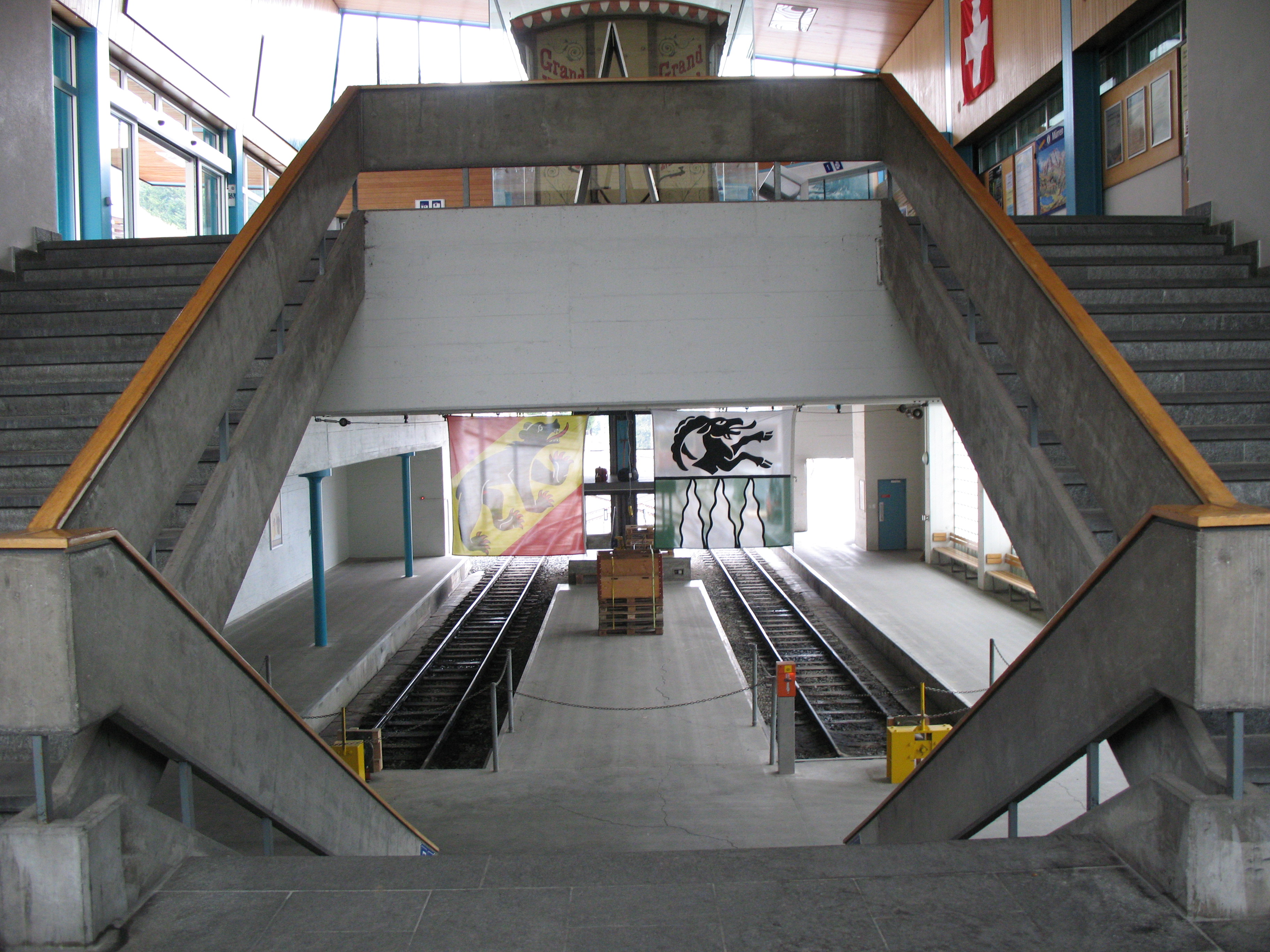
The station interior, with platforms. The preserved horse tram can be seen on the upper level.

Mürren is a railway station and terminus of the Bergbahn Lauterbrunnen-Mürren, a hybrid cable car and rail link that connects it with the village of Lauterbrunnen in the Bernese Oberland region of Switzerland. It takes its name from the resort village of Mürren in which it is situated.

The station has two passenger tracks within the lower level of a two-level station building, with a street entrance at the upper level. The Lauterbrunnen-Mürren line also handles goods traffic to and from Mürren, and a freight depot is situated to the north of the passenger station.

The station is served by the following passenger trains:

Operator	Train Type	Route	Typical Frequency	Notes
Bergbahn Lauterbrunnen-Mürren		Lauterbrunnen - Grütschalp - Winteregg - Mürren	2 to 4 per hour	

Between 1894 and the 1930s, Mürren station was linked to the Kurhaus in Mürren village by the Mürren tramway, a 500 m (1,600 ft) long, 500 mm (19 3/4 in) gauge, horse-drawn tramway. The passenger car for this line has been restored, and is now on display in the upper level of the station.
