= Mürren tramway =

Tramway line in Mürren, Switzerland

Mürren Tramway
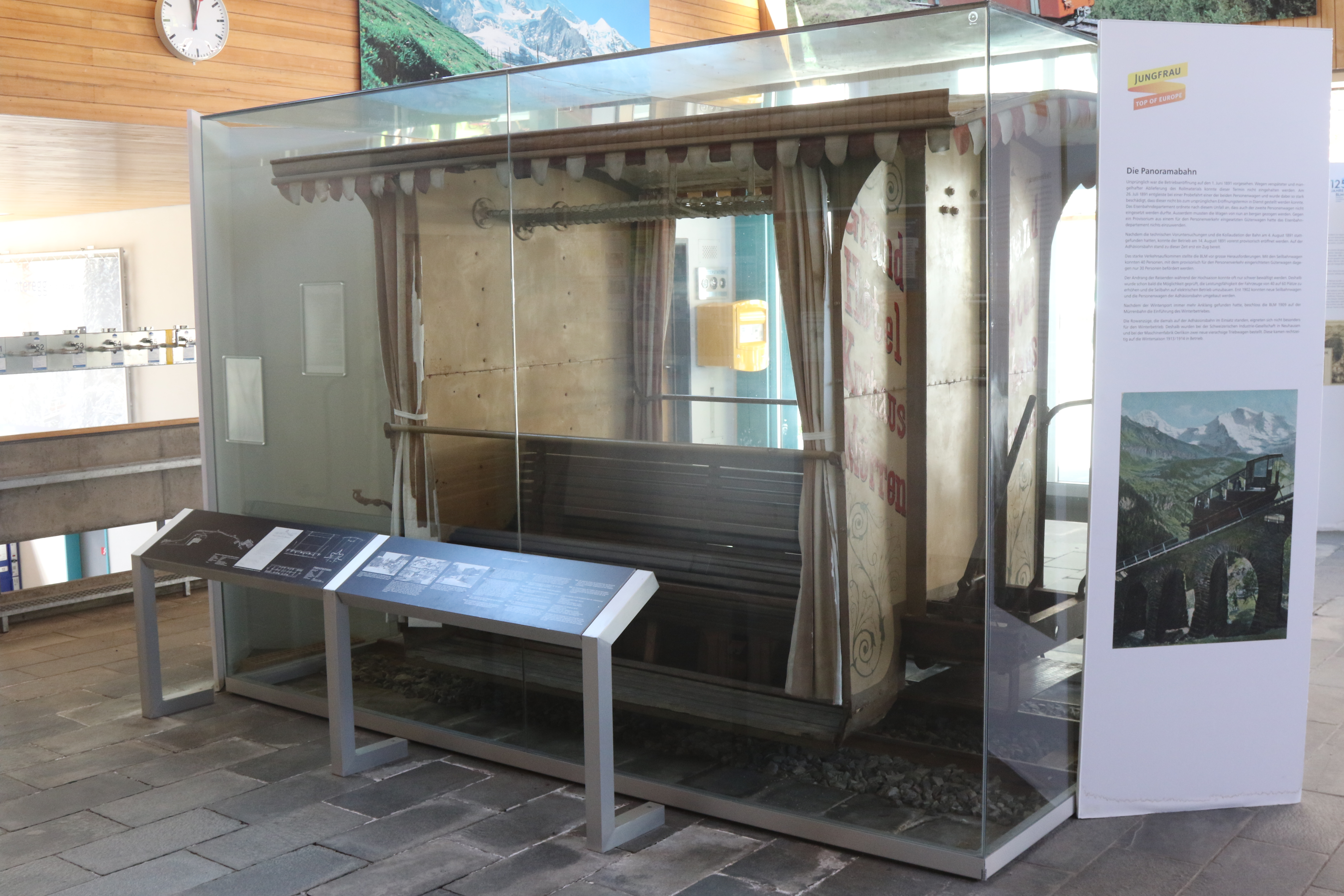
- Preserved passenger tramway car of 1894 in Mürren railway station

Overview
- Status: Demolished
- Locale: Bernese Highlands
- Termini: Mürren BLM; Mürren Kurhaus
- Stations: 2

Service
- Type: Horse-drawn tramway
- Services: 1
- Rolling stock: 1 passenger 2 goods

History
- Opened: 1894
- Closed: 1937

Technical
- Line length: 0.5 km (0.31 mi)
- Number of tracks: Single track
- Character: At-grade street running
- Track gauge: 500 mm (19 3/4 in)
- Minimum radius: 15 m
- Operating speed: 7 km/h (4.3 mph)
- Highest elevation: 1,641 m (5,384 ft)

The Mürren tramway was a horse-drawn, and later human-powered tramway located in Mürren, Switzerland that operated between 1894 and 1937.

== History ==
In 1893, to connect his hotel with the railway station of the Lauterbrunnen-Murren cable car, Johann Sterchi-Wettach, owner of the then Grand Hotel and Kurhaus Mürren, contracted with the company A. Oehler in Wildegg for a 0.5 km (0.31 mi) tramway to bring his guests from BLM station. The operation was stopped because it failed to submit a concession application.

On 13 April 1894, the Federal Assembly approved the federal decree concerning the concession of the Mürren runway. The Federal Council granted the operating license on 10 July 1894 and the tramway began operation. During the three-month summer season, there are 3 to 5 daily trips back and forth. The one-way fare is 30 cents per person, which is approximately equal to the hourly wage of a worker.

At 500 mm (19 3/4 in), the Murren runway had the smallest gauge of all Swiss railways with federal concession for passenger transport. The rails were laid in the street, and three vehicles were purchased, including a covered passenger car consisting of two benches length-ways on either side, and two goods vehicles. The tramway transported around 1000 guests and 700 tonnes (690 LT) of goods per summer season.

All vehicles were pulled by horse. Services were suspended from 1914 until the summer season of 1920. In 1930 when passenger services were discontinued. Afterwards, the goods carts were pushed by hand, until 1937 when the tramway closed permanently.

The tracks were left disused until the 1960s when, during street renovations, the tracks were either torn up or paved-over. The fate of the goods carts is unknown, however the passenger car remained and has been restored and placed inside the BLM station on display. The Grand Hotel and Kurhaus closed in 1945 and were eventually demolished in 1954.

== Route ==
The tramway started with a two-track station in the street outside the existing BLM station and followed the main village road until the Kurhaus. A switch was installed just before the Kurhaus in order to allow future expansion to other hotels, however this never occurred and the switch was left unused. In the hotel area, the tramway ended with three tracks: the passenger track, which led to the hotel's entrance, and two more goods tracks, which led to the hotel's service area. The journey took around 7 minutes to complete.
