= Lauterbrunnen railway station =

Railway station in the canton of Bern, Switzerland

Lauterbrunnen
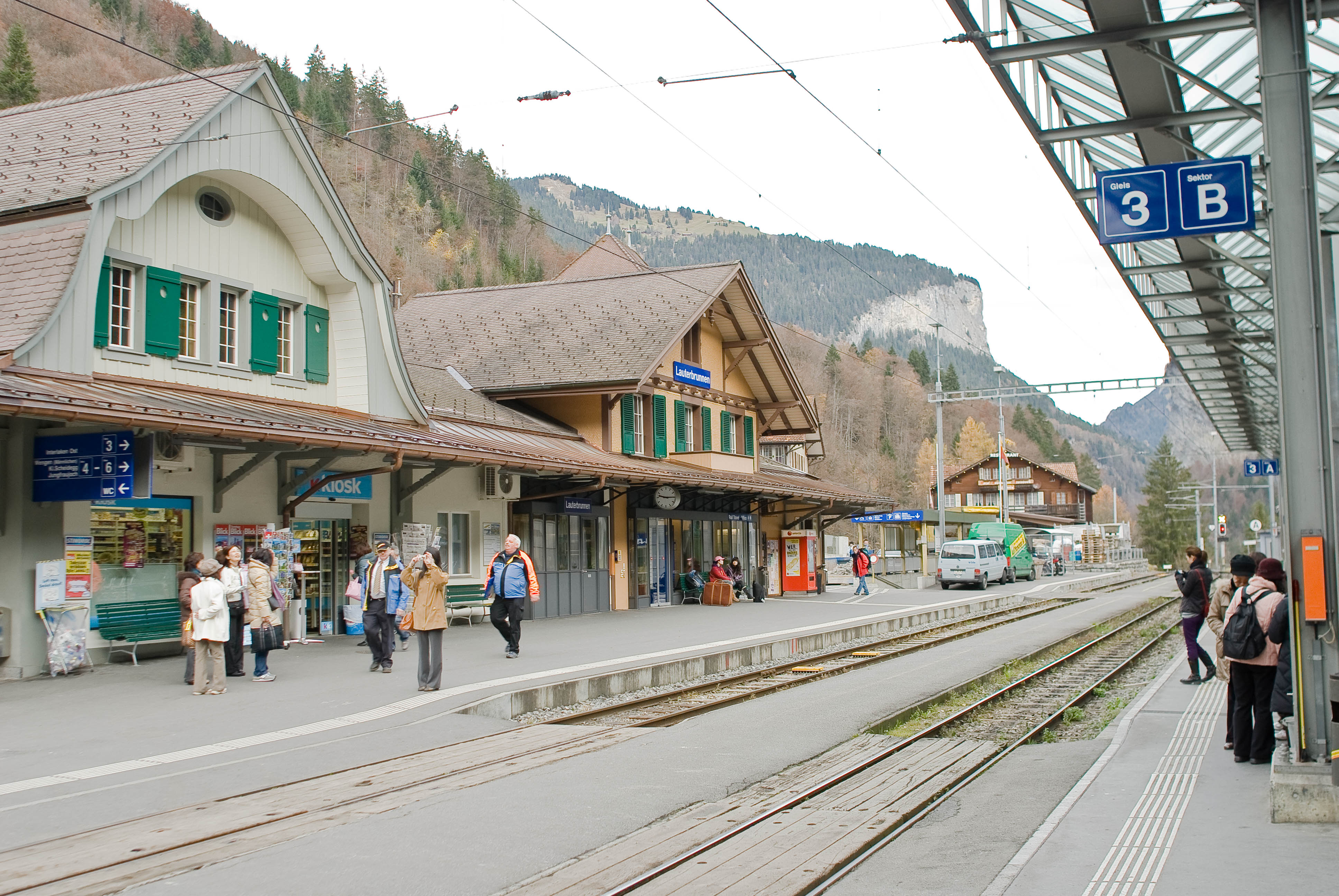
- The station in 2008

General information
- Location: Bahnhofplatz; Lauterbrunnen, Bern; Switzerland
- Coordinates: 46°35′54″N 7°54′29″E
- Elevation: 796 m (2,612 ft)
- Owner: Berner Oberland-Bahnen
- Lines: Bernese Oberland line; Lauterbrunnen–Mürren line; Wengernalp line
- Distance: 12.3 km (7.6 mi) from Interlaken Ost
- Platforms: 3
- Train operators: Berner Oberland-Bahnen; Jungfraubahn AG
- Connections: PostAuto Schweiz

Other information
- Fare zone: 822 (Libero)

History
- Opened: 1 July 1890
- Electrified: 17 March 1914

Services
Preceding station	Jungfraubahn AG	Following station
Terminus	Wengernalp Railway	Wengwald towards Kleine Scheidegg
Terminus	Lauterbrunnen–Mürren Mountain Railway	Grütschalp towards Mürren
Preceding station	Berner Oberland-Bahnen AG	Following station
Zweilütschinen towards Interlaken Ost	Bernese Oberland Railway	Terminus
Location
- Location within Switzerland Location within Canton of Bern

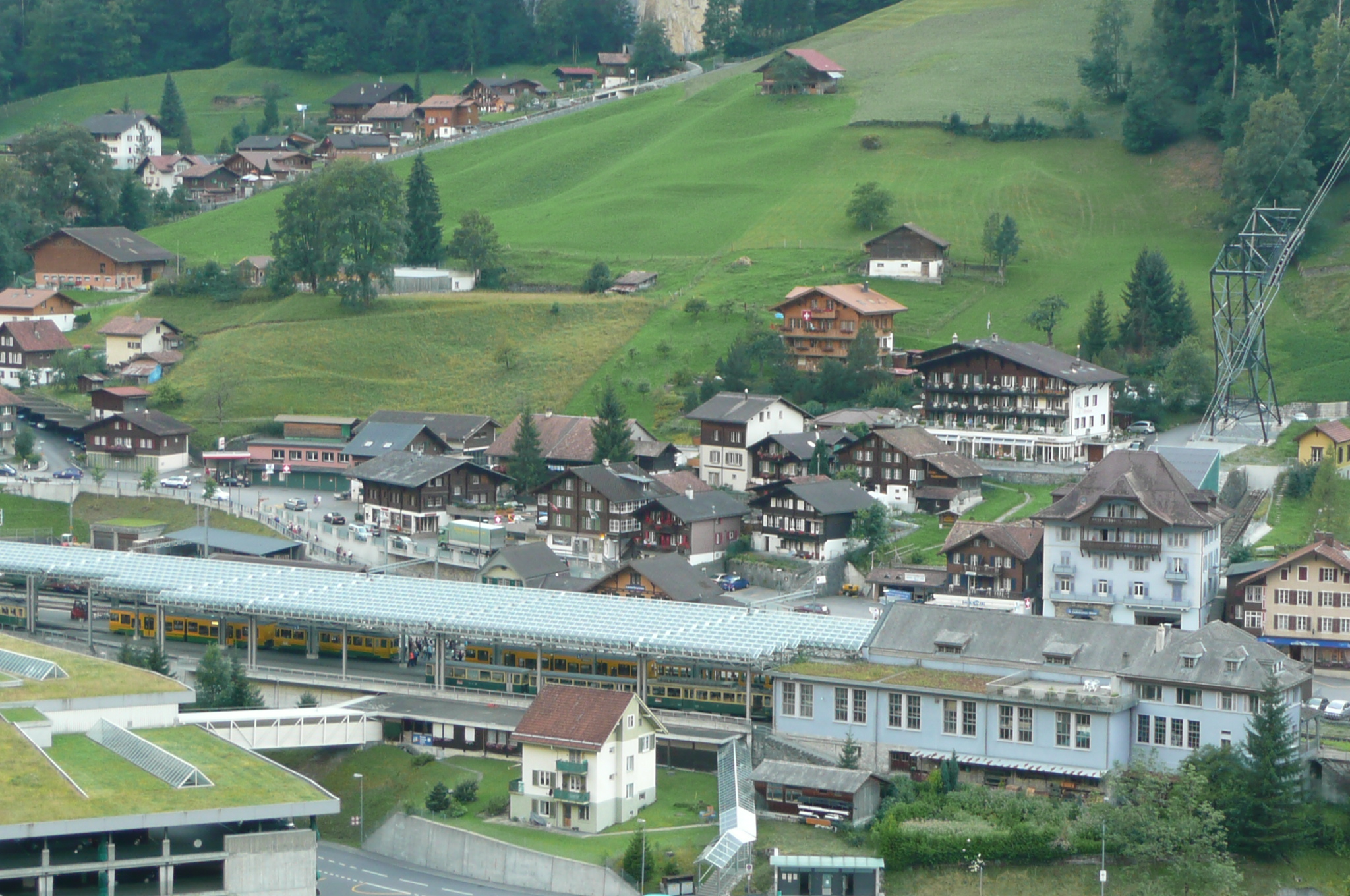
Lauterbrunnen station seen from the east. Wengernalpbahn trains can be seen in the nearest platforms under the glass roof. The terminus of the cable car stage of the Bergbahn Lauterbrunnen-Mürren can be seen to the right.

Lauterbrunnen is a railway station in the village and municipality of Lauterbrunnen in the Swiss canton of Bern. The station is on the Berner Oberland Bahn (BOB), whose trains operate services to Interlaken Ost. It is also the valley terminus of the Wengernalpbahn (WAB), whose trains operate to Kleine Scheidegg via Wengen, and of the Bergbahn Lauterbrunnen-Mürren (BLM), whose hybrid cable car and rail link runs to Mürren. Before 2006, this was a funicular (Seilbahn Lauterbrunnen–Grütschalp).

The BOB and WAB lines use different gauges, and there is no physical connection between them. However the trains operate from adjacent platforms within the same station. Trains of the BOB enter the station from the north, whilst trains of the WAB enter from the south. The lower, cable car, stage of the BLM departs from a terminal across the street from the main station which is connected to the main station via an underground walkway. The depot and workshop of the WAB lies to the south of the station.

== History ==
The station opened on 1 July 1890. In 1929 a new 72 metres (236 ft) shed for the Wengernalpbahn was opened in Lauterbrunnen.

In 1993 a long term reconstruction project which had taken over 12 years and cost CHF 7.0m was completed with the installation of the glass platform roof and direct connection ramps from the multi-storey car park.

== Services ==
As of the December 2020 timetable change, the following rail services stop at Lauterbrunnen:

- Regio:
  - half-hourly service to Interlaken Ost.
  - half-hourly service to Kleine Scheidegg.
  - aerial tram every fifteen minutes to Grütschalp with connecting rail service to Mürren.

Post bus services connect Lauterbrunnen station to other local places, including a half-hourly service to Stechelberg via the Trümmelbach Falls.

A large multi-story car park is situated to the east of station, intended for the use of travellers to the car free resorts of Wengen and Mürren, who must complete their journey by train.

== See also ==
- Rail transport in Switzerland
