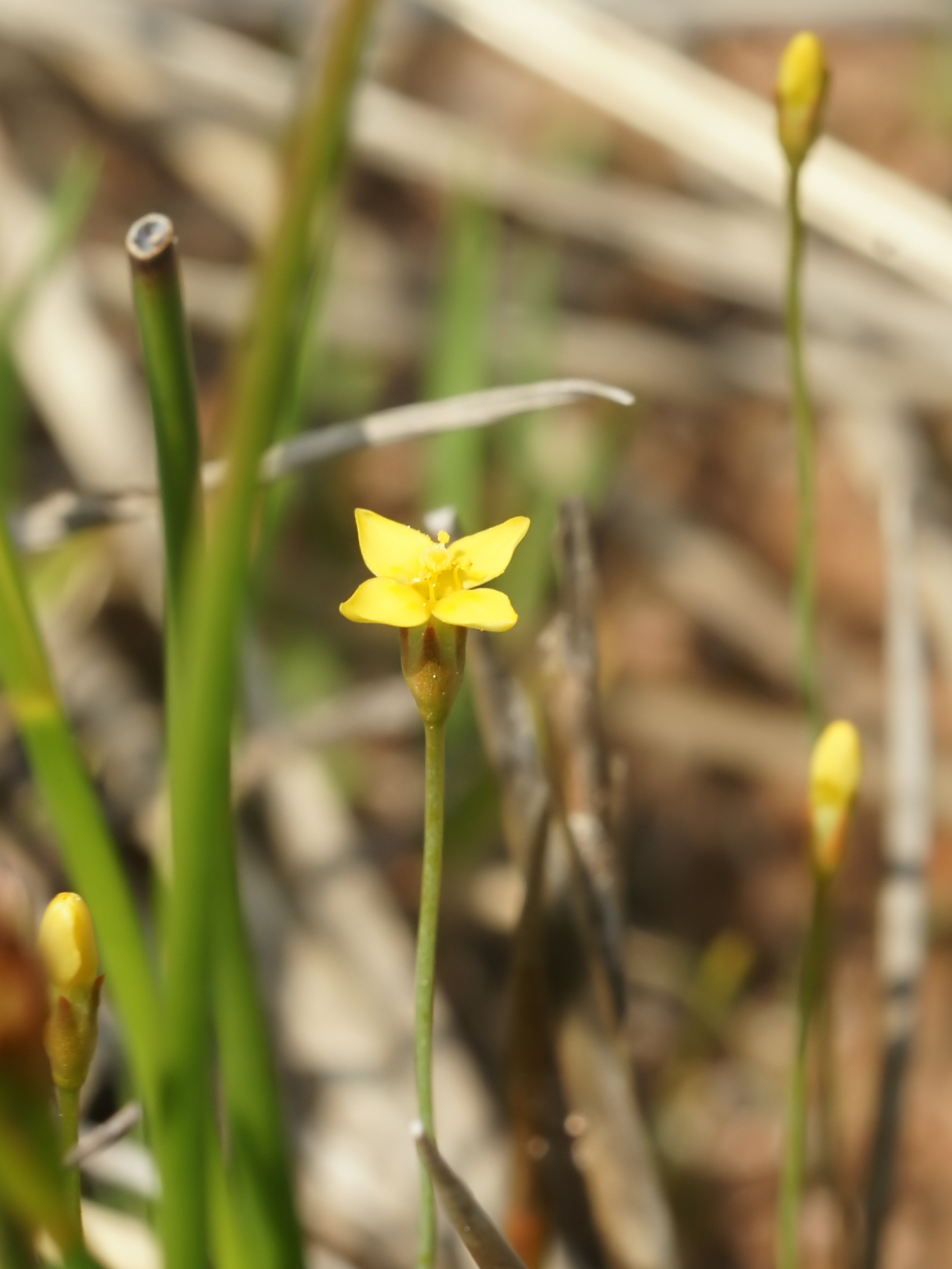

Conservation status
- Vulnerable (IUCN 3.1)

Scientific classification
- Kingdom: Plantae
- Clade: Embryophytes
- Clade: Tracheophytes
- Clade: Angiosperms
- Clade: Eudicots
- Clade: Asterids
- Order: Gentianales
- Family: Gentianaceae
- Genus: Cicendia
- Species: C. filiformis

Binomial name
- Cicendia filiformis (L.) Delabre, 1800

= Cicendia filiformis =

Species of flowering plant

Cicendia filiformis, also called yellow centaury or slender cicendia, is a species of flowering planet of the family Gentianaceae.

== Appearance ==
C. filiformis grows to 2–12 cm (0.8–4.7 in) in height with linear leaves 2–6 mm long. The flowers are yellow (but can be tinged with pink), have four petals and only open in sunlight.

== Habitat ==
C. filiformis is found around seasonally-flooded pools, alongside rutted tracks, and growing on heathlands of acid grassland with sandy or peaty soils. It grows best in areas where there are also free-roming grazing animals and few competitive species. C. filiformis tends to be found alongside several other species of declining plants including three-lobed water-crowfoot (Ranunculus tripartitus), chaffweed (Anagallis minima), allseed (Radiola linoides), and pillwort (Pilularia globulifera).

== Distribution ==
C. filiformis is most commonly found in Western and Mediterranean Europe. It can also be found in southern parts of Australia.

=== Within the United Kingdom ===
Within the United Kingdom, C. filiformis is generally restricted to heathlands in Cornwall, Devon, Dorset, the New Forest, the Sussex Weald and parts of St David's Peninsula in Pembrokeshire. It has become "extremely rare" in Devon and Sussex and "rapidly declining" in Cornwall and Dorset. The last remaining areas where C. filiformis is widespread are the Lizard in Cornwall and the New Forest.

There were major losses in C. filiformis before 1930, most notably in Cornwall, followed by steady decline, thanks to the loss of its key habitat areas.
