= Vendelsöarna =

Nature reserve in Halland, Sweden

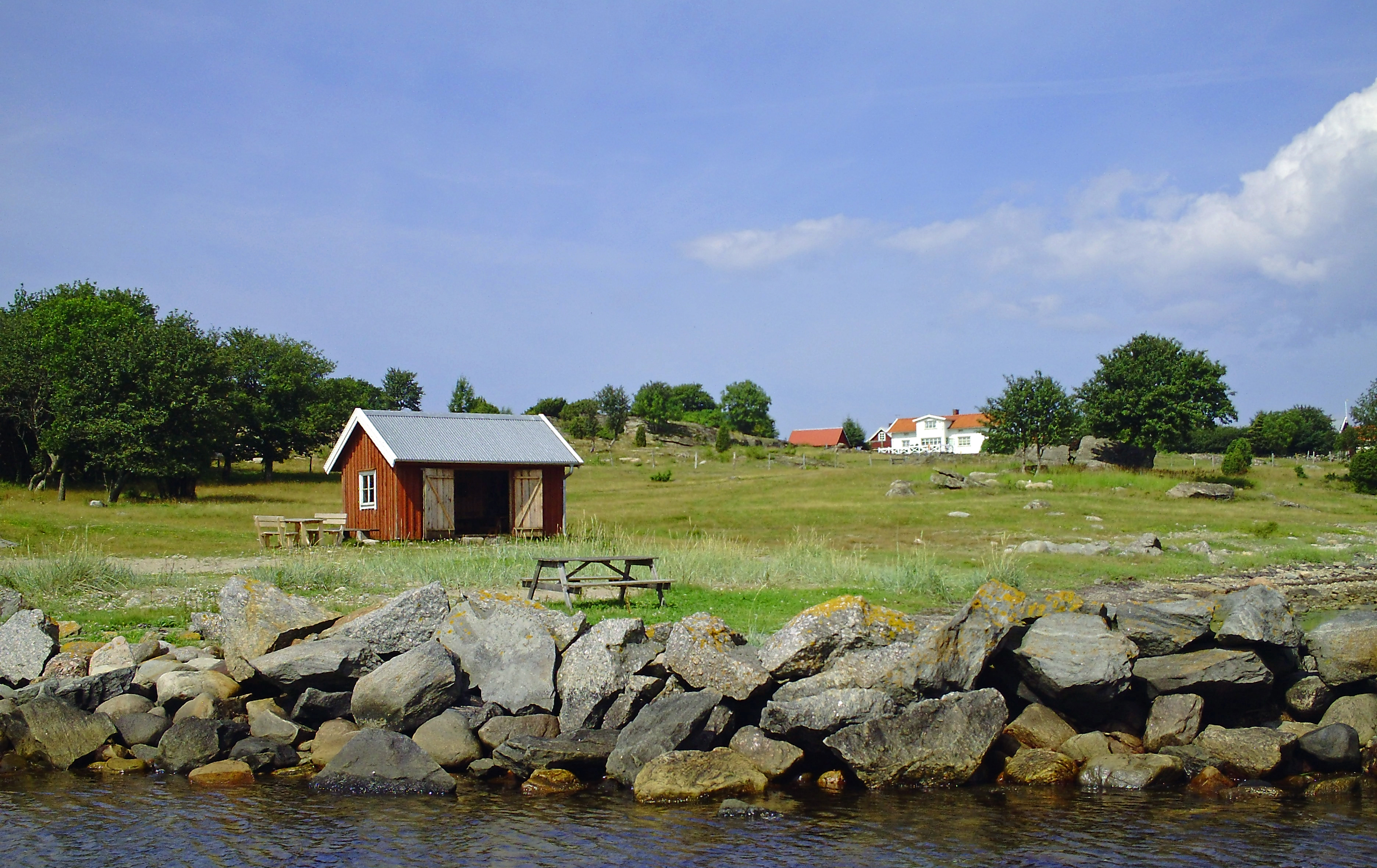
- A part of the largest island, Vendelsö.
- Interactive map of Vendelsöarna

Geography
- Coordinates: 57°18′24″N 12°6′39″E
- Province: Halland
- County: Halland County
- Municipality: Varberg Municipality

Vendelsöarna ("Vendelsö islands") is an archipelago and a nature reserve in Varberg Municipality, Sweden, near the border with Kungsbacka Municipality. The reserve consists of the northern part of the main island Vendelsö and the surrounding islands Brattö, Norstön, Kidholmen, and Älmö. There are two other islands in the archipelago, Ustö and Knarrskär, but they are not included in the reserve. The protected area has an area of 563 hectares, of which 128 hectares are land. It was established in 2002.

The islands in the nature reserve are dominated by an open landscape with Calluna and grass heath with junipers. The area has been used as a pastureland for hundreds of years, and common species are catsfoot, wild thyme, common milkwort, Radiola linoides, and chaffweed. At Älmö, sea holly has been found. At Vendelsöarna, birds such as redshank, Eurasian oystercatcher, and ringed plover are breeding. At Älmö, there are large populations of gulls. In this area, there is a prohibition of access during the breeding period, from 1 April to 15 July. In the shallow waters surrounding the islands, there are invertebrates and small fish.

Vendelsöarna is a popular picnic destination and can be reached by boat.
