= Mittelland =

Mittelland (German, ‘middle land’) may refer to:

- Mittelland, Switzerland, a district of the canton of Appenzell Ausserrhoden, Switzerland
- Swiss Plateau (German: Schweizer Mittelland), a major landscape in Switzerland
- Mittelland, part of Heligoland, a small archipelago in the North Sea
- Mittelland Canal, in central Germany
