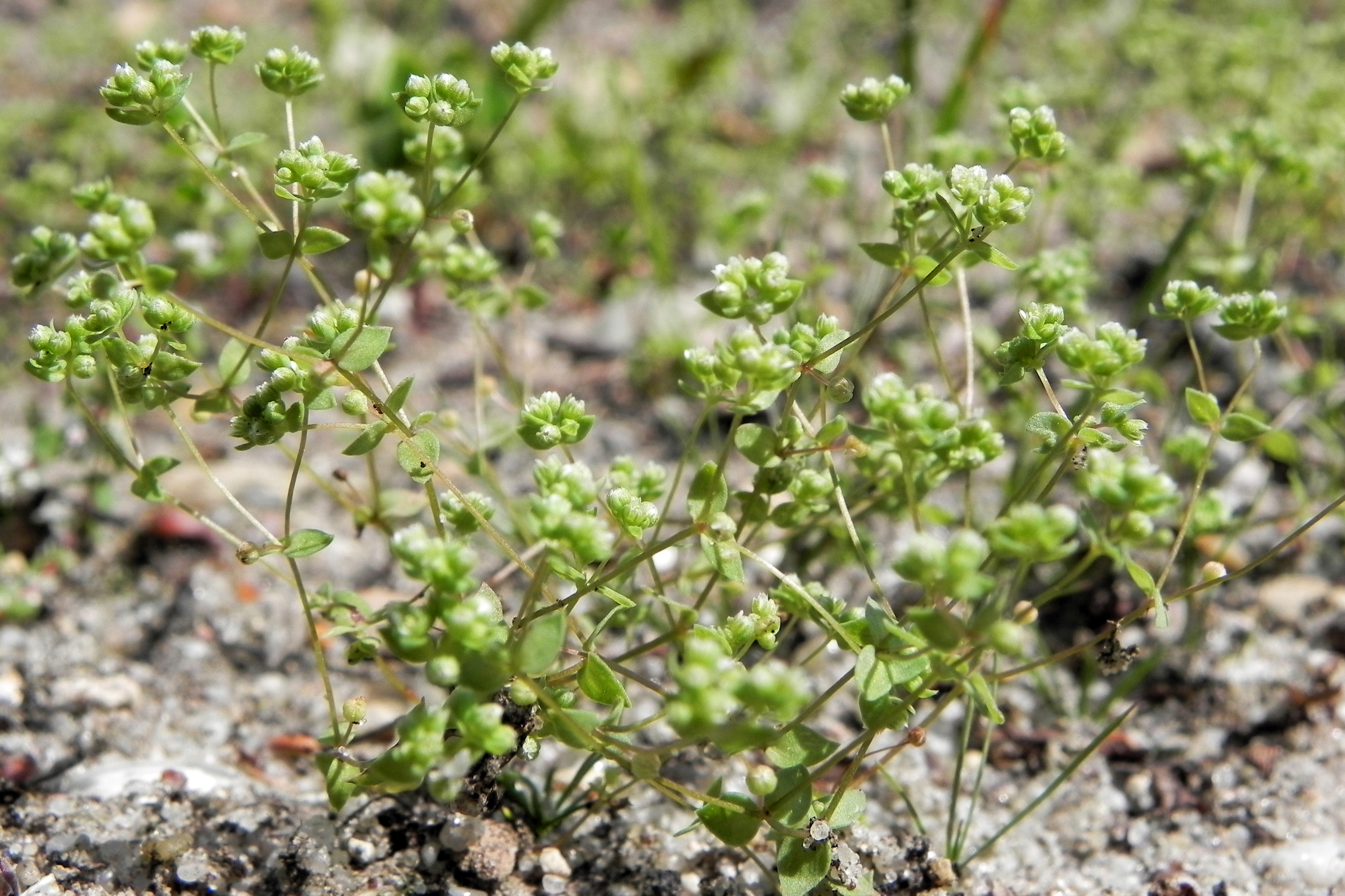

Scientific classification
- Kingdom: Plantae
- Clade: Embryophytes
- Clade: Tracheophytes
- Clade: Angiosperms
- Clade: Eudicots
- Clade: Rosids
- Order: Malpighiales
- Family: Linaceae
- Subfamily: Linoideae
- Genus: Radiola; Hill
- Species: R. linoides

Binomial name
- Radiola linoides Roth

Synonyms
- Linodes radiola Kuntze; Linum exiguum Salisb.; Linum millegranum (Sm.) Gray; Linum multiflorum Lam.; Linum radiola L.; Linum tetrapetalum Gilib.; Millegrana radiola (L.) Druce; Radiola dichotoma Moench; Radiola filiformis Dulac; Radiola linoidea St.-Lag.; Radiola millegrana Sm.; Radiola multiflora Asch.; Radiola tetrapetala Steud.

= Radiola linoides =

Species of flowering plant

Radiola linoides is the sole species in the Radiola genus, a monotypic genus of flowering plants belonging to the family Linaceae. It has the common names of 'allseed' and 'flaxseed'. It has a very short stem which is repeatedly subdivided, with a pair of very small leaves and a single white flower at each fork and at the end of the branches. It has leaves which are opposite arranged, oval (in shape) and sessile.

== Description ==
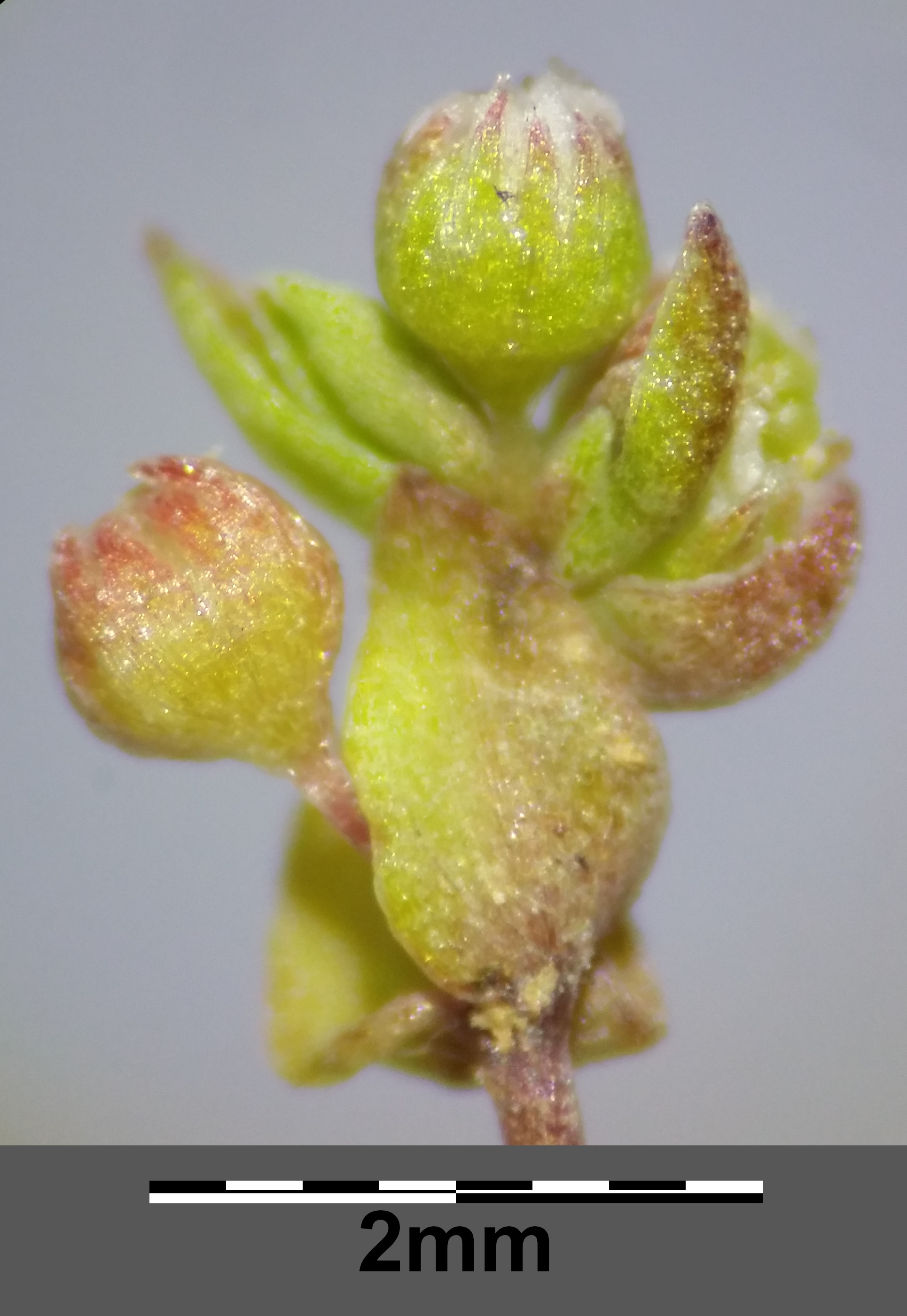
Flower bud of Radiola linoides, Czech Republic

Radiola linoides is a small, herbaceous, annual. It is commonly overlooked due to its size, and delicate form. It is between 1.3–7.5 cm (1–3 in) tall, and dichotomously branched, (meaning dividing at axils into 2 branches), repeatedly subdivided, or forked. The hairless, stems are very slender, threadlike, about 0.5 mm in diameter. They are often purple-flushed, or reddish.

The leaves are arranged opposite, and are obovate, or ovate to elliptic in form. They are very small, only 1.5–2 mm (0–0 in) long and dull green or slightly glaucous, often tinged with purple and quite glabrous (hairless). They have one-vein, and have transparent (or hyaline) margins that appear ragged due to the presence of minute teeth or lobes along the edges.

It has bracts which are usually leaf-like. It flowers between July and August, with numerous tiny flowers, at the branch tips, or at each forked stem. They are white, with 4 equal, sepals and 4 petals. They are 1.0–1.5 mm (0–0 in) long.

It has 4 stamens, which are 0.5–0.8 mm (0–0 in) long and white anthers. The very small pollen of the plant has been analysed and measured to be about 25μm.

After flowering, it produces a seed capsule, which is rounded, or globular. The globose seed capsules are thought to be more noticeable than the flowers. The common name of 'allseed' is due to the multiple seed capsules on the plant, each containing 8 seeds. The seed capsules are 0.1 mm wide, and have 8 cells and 8 valves. Inside the capsules, are very small, (0.4–0.5 mm (0–0 in) long and 0.2–0.3 mm (0–0 in) wide) brown seeds, that are obovoid to ellipsoid in shape. They are slightly flattened on one side and have a smooth, lustrous surface.

=== Ploidy ===
It has a chromosome reading of 2n = 18.

== Taxonomy ==
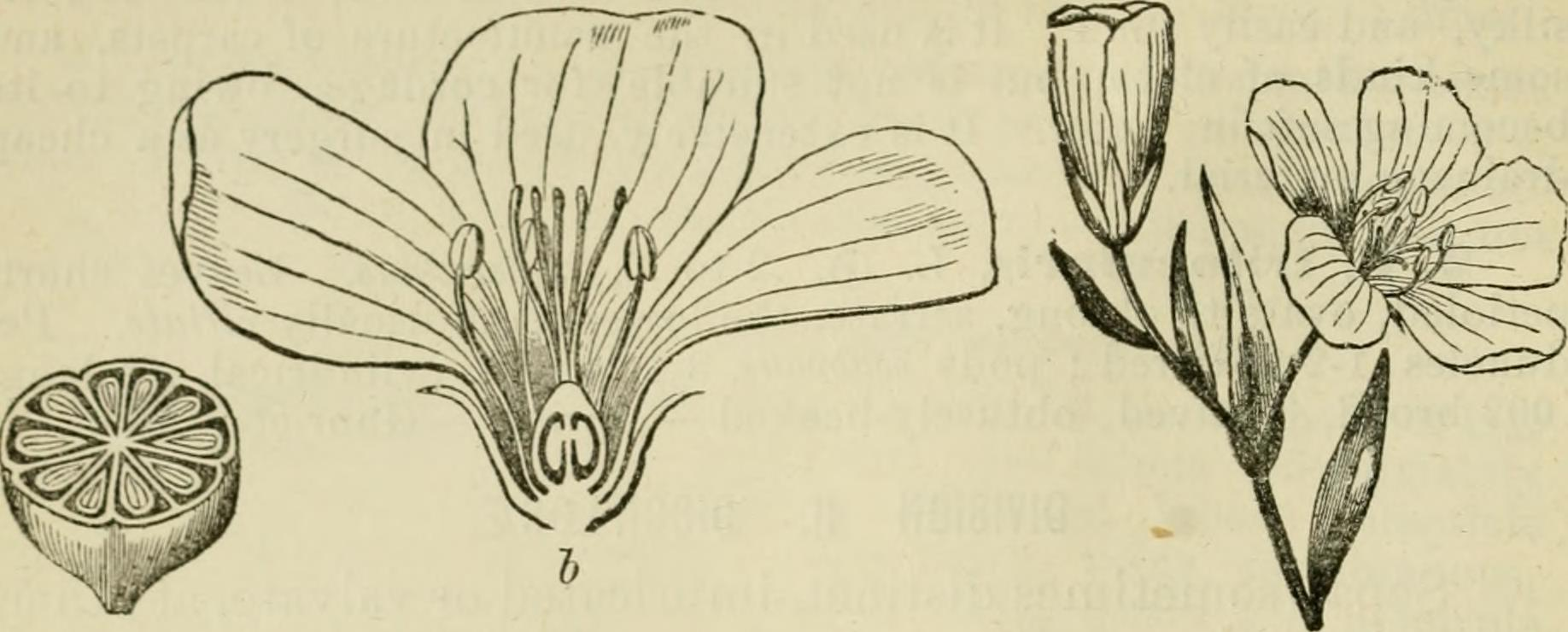
Illustration from Flora of Syria by George Edward Post, in 1838-1909

It has several common names including; 'allseed', this is due to its ability to have multiple seed production. It is also known as 'flax seed', 'thyme leaved flaxseed', and 'thousand seeded flax'.

In Swedish, it is known as 'dvärglin'.

It was originally named and published as Linum radiola by Linnaeus in his book Sp. Pl. on page 281 in 1753. Then in 1756, Hill transferred it into the genus Radiola, it also assumed the name Radiola radiola. Although being a tautonym, it was declared not valid by taxonomists. So then in 1788, Roth gave the species name as Radiola linoides.

The genus of Radiola has one known synonym of Millegrana Adans., when the species was known as Millegrana radiola Druce, Fl. Berks. 114 in 1898.

The genus Radiola was first described and published in John Hill's book, 'The British Herbal' on page 227 in 1756, and then later the species Radiola linoides was first published by Albrecht Wilhelm Roth in Tentamen Florae Germanicae (Tent. Fl. Germ.) Vol.1 on page 71 in 1788.

The genus name of Radiola is derived from the Latin word radius meaning a ray, because the cells of the ripe capsule diverge like a little wheel. The Latin specific epithet of linoides is derived from Linum (from the original Linnaeus name of Linum radiola).

The genus and species is recognized by the United States Department of Agriculture and the Agricultural Research Service, since 3 February 1998.

== Distribution and habitat ==
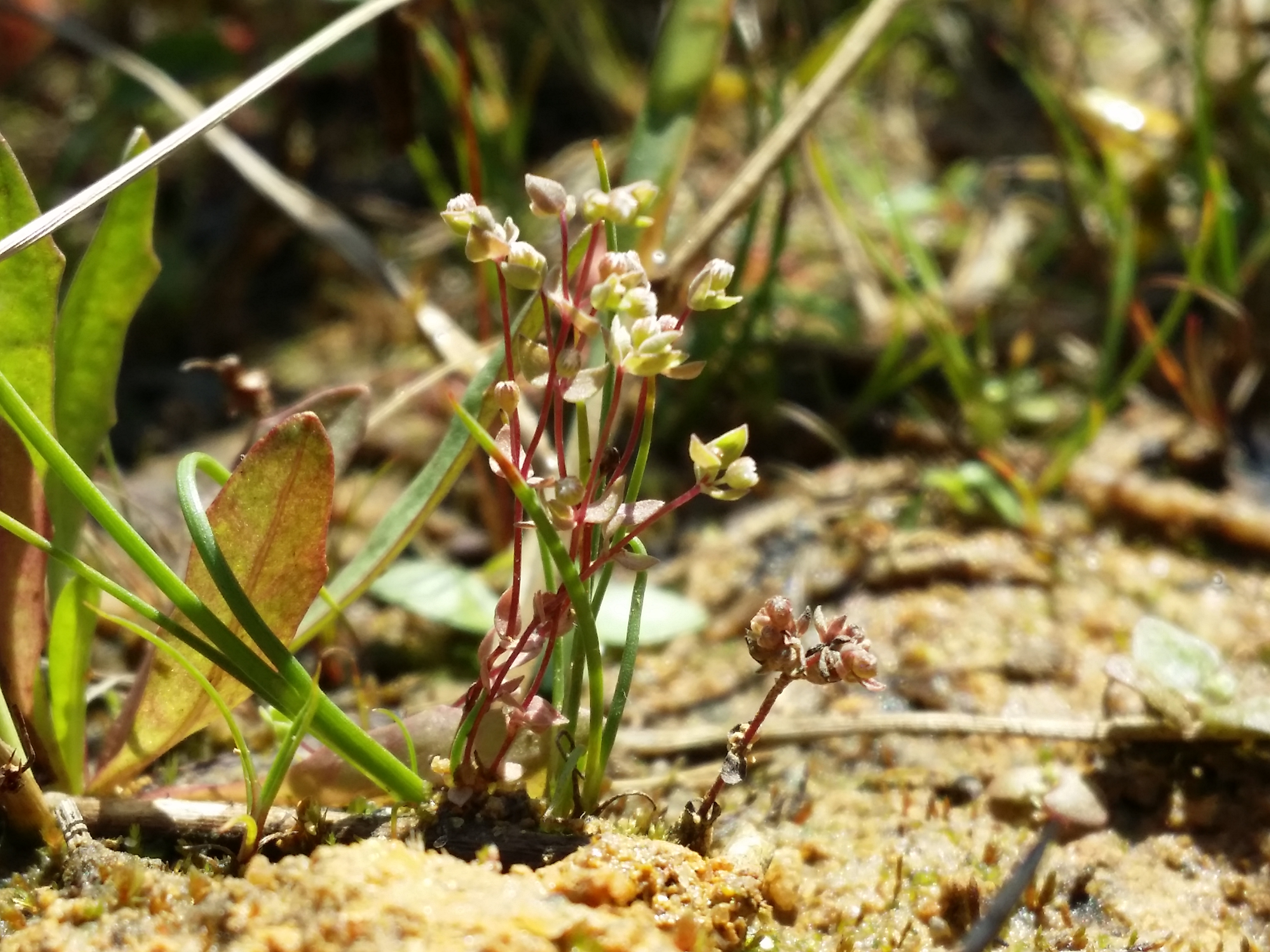
Radiola linoides on the shore of a pond, Jihočeský kraj, Czech Republic

=== Range ===
Its wide native range stretches from temperate Europe, (found within the countries of Albania, the Balearic Islands, the Baltic States (such as Estonia, Latvia and Lithuania), Belarus, Belgium, Bulgaria, Corsica, Czechoslovakia, Denmark, France, Germany, Great Britain (including Northern Ireland), Greece, Hungary, Ireland, Italy, Netherlands, Norway, Poland, Portugal, Romania, Sardinia, Sicily, Spain, Sweden, Ukraine and Yugoslavia), parts of Russia (including; central European Russia, northwest European Russia and south European Russia), Macaronesia (including; the Canary Islands, Cape Verde and Madeira), parts of Africa (including; Algeria, Cameroon, Ethiopia, Madagascar, Malawi, Morocco (including the Tingitan Peninsula,), Tanzania and Tunisia), and also parts of western Asia (including; Lebanon, Syria and Turkey).

It was later introduced into America and found in Maine, New Brunswick and Nova Scotia. It was introduced to New Zealand, on North Island (Kaimaumau Swamp).

It was found to be extinct in Switzerland, and is listed as being rare in Lithuania.

=== Habitat ===
It is a calcifuge species (meaning it does not tolerate alkaline soils), and it grows on acidic and damp soils, in grasslands and heaths, and commons, or beside ponds, paths, or tracks and in woodland rides, and on roadsides (in Scotland). In southern England, it can also be found on the margins of fishponds, fields or abandoned meadows and old sand pits, and moist, boggy places in Devon. It likes the damp forests on the Iberian Peninsula. Tolerating infertile, peaty or sandy ground. Near the coast, it is found in dune slacks, sandy grassland, on machair, and in soil-filled rock cracks, or rocky outcrops. It is found at altitudes of between 0 to 100 m (0 to 328 ft) above sea level.

== Ecology ==
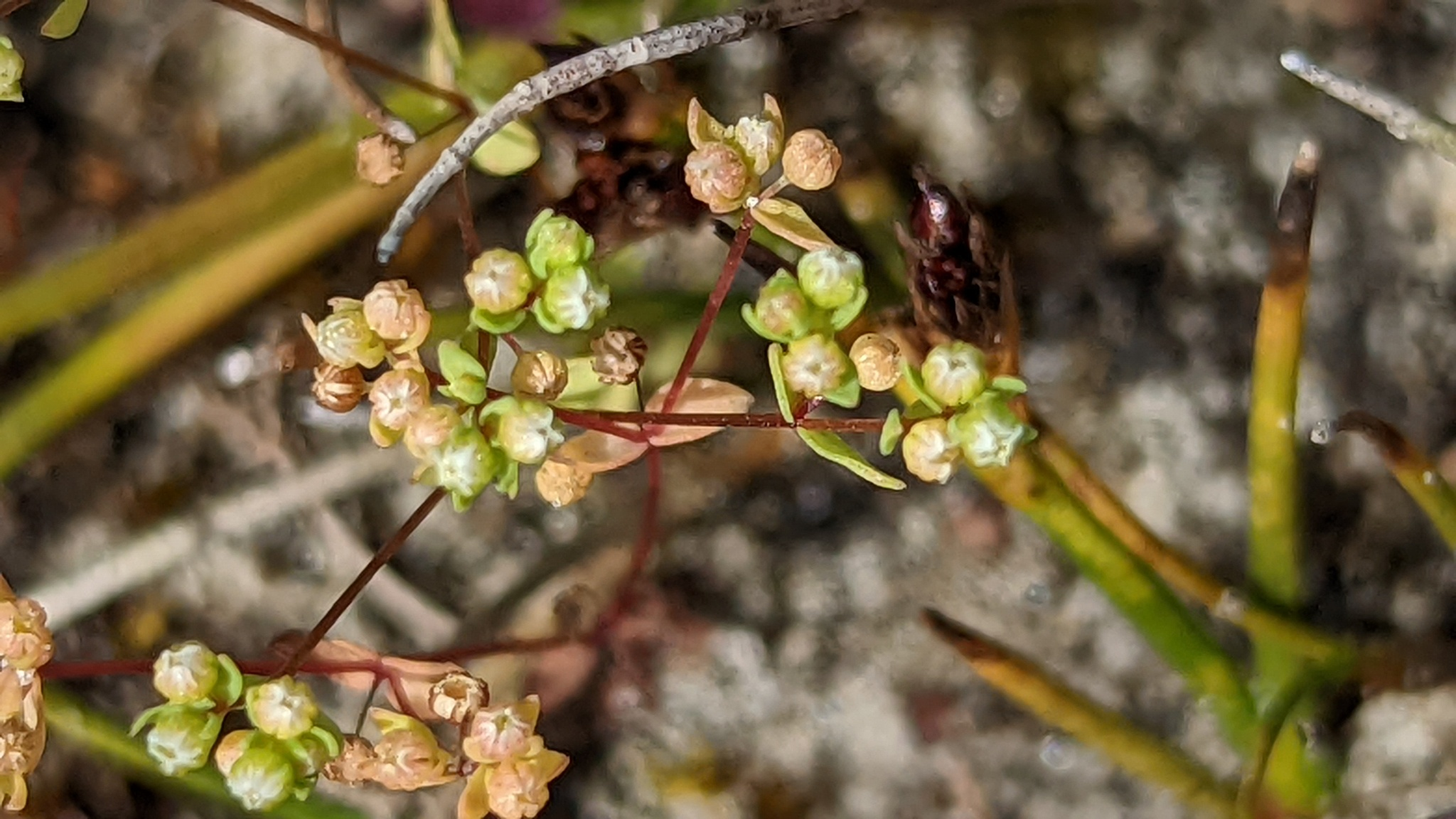
Allseed (Radiola linoides), Netherlands

In Britain, it is generally found in acidic grasslands and heathlands, on grassy cliff slopes, along the rutted (broken) edges of tracks, beside woodland rides and firebreaks, at the edges of ponds, in sandy grassland, machair (low-lying grassy plains) and dune slacks and in soil-filled rock crevices (Wilmore 2002; Chater 2010; Rand & Mundell 2011). In Dorset, it is often found with Chaffweed (Anagallis minima).

Radiola linoides is a plant of sparsely vegetated, damp, infertile, moderately acid peaty, gravelly or sandy soils, often found in draw-down zones or where there has been some poaching by livestock. Rodwell in 2000, included R. linoides as an associate of short open turf belonging to the NVC, MC5, maritime therophyte community but its NVC affinities are likely to be much broader and include a range of grassland and heathland types.

Whilst in Ireland, it is found growing with Plantago maritima in dense, exposed conditions.

It grows in Poland, with other damp loving plants such as Cyperus flavescens, Centunculus minimus and Illecebrum verticillatum.

Across Europe, R. linoides is also associated with annual-rich west Mediterranean siliceous grassland, the fumaroles of Pantelleria in Sicily, Juncus bufonius dominated communities with Centunculus minimus and Centaurium pulchellum, and temporarily inundated small herb communities with associates including Elatine spp., Damasonium bourgaei and Samolus valerandi (Anon 2013). In the Netherlands, R. linoides was recorded from fields that are filled with water during the winter months and then frozen for ice skating.

=== Seed survival ===
The seeds of R. linoides are able to survive in the soil, even after general situation conditions have become unsuitable for mature plants to establish in the above-ground vegetation (Plassmann et al. 2009). R. linoides is therefore capable of opportunistically colonising areas from the seed bank when suitable conditions (e.g. bare, damp, open ground) become available, although it is not known how long the seed remains viable if unsuitable conditions continue for an extended or prolonged period of time (i.e. more than five years).

The very small, smooth seeds are also known to be able to survive internal (endozoochorous) dispersal by animals, and the combination of seed morphology and habitat suggests that R. linoides seed also has the potential to be transported long distances on the feet or feathers of wildfowl (Salisbury 1970), or on the feet or hair of cattle.

== Pests ==
Radiola linoides has been recorded as a host for Melampsora lini, a fungal pathogen responsible for rust disease on flax and linseed plants. (Lawrence et al. 2007)

== Conservation ==
Up to 1930, the population of R. linoides within the United Kingdom, went through a sharp decline in numbers of plants. This was mainly due to loss of habitat, (e.g. lowland heaths) or disturbances/damage to the habitats and also the lack of grazing (which in turn, increased the growth of more vigorous plants). It was estimated that up to 95% of a sample of sites in Dorset between 1935 and 1992 were lost and that remaining populations of the plant were very small. It has a mainly coastal distribution across western Ireland, south-west England and Wales, northwards along the coast to western and north-east Scotland, with outliers in southern England and East Anglia. Its distribution within the rest of the British isles seemed to be stable. It could also be easily overlooked and may be under-recorded in some areas. It was assessed in 2015, as Near Threatened in Great Britain as a whole, Vulnerable in England, but of Least Concern in Wales.

In Germany, the Venus flytraps (Dionaea muscipula) was introduced into the Wahner Heide Nature Reserve near Bonn where a small population of the threatened Radiola linoides was mistakenly destroyed by conservationists when re-planting, before the introduced species was later removed.

In the biogeographic regions of Mittelland, Switzerland and Alpensüdflanke, it has been assessed as 'Regionally Extinct'.

In the Czech Republic, on the Red List 2017 (IUCN threat category) it is classed as CR - critically endangered, but since it was also classed as not a native plant, it is not protected.
