= Reiat District =

- District
- Interactive map of Reiat District
- Country: Switzerland
- Canton: Schaffhausen
- Time zone: UTC+1 (CET)
  - Summer (DST): UTC+2 (CEST)

Reiat District is one of districts of the Canton of Schaffhausen, Switzerland.
