= Districts of Switzerland =

Administrative division of Switzerland

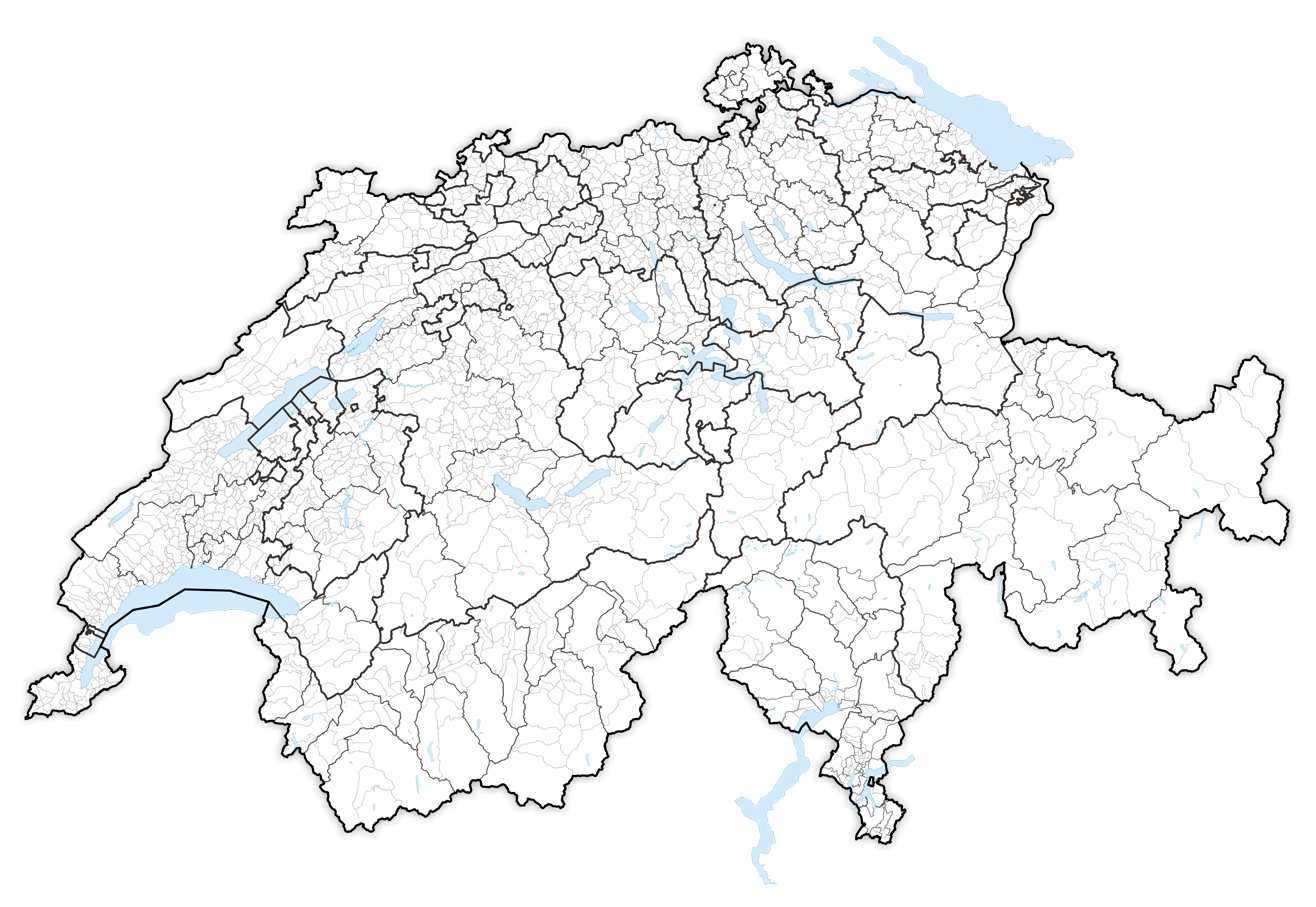
Map of Switzerland showing cantonal, districts and municipal boundaries (January 2026).

Districts of Switzerland are a political subdivision for cantons. In the federally constituted Switzerland, each canton is completely free to decide its own internal organisation. Therefore, there exists a variety of structures and terminology for the subnational entities between canton and municipality, loosely termed districts. Most cantons are divided into Bezirke (German for districts, singular Bezirk). They are also termed Ämter (Lucerne, singular Amt), Amtsbezirke (Bern, Amtsbezirk), district (in French) or distretto (Ticino and part of Graubünden). The Bezirke generally provide only administration and court organization. However, for historical reasons districts in cantons Grisons and Schwyz are their own legal entities with jurisdiction over tax and often have their own Landsgemeinde.

Seven of the 26 cantons – Uri, Obwalden, Nidwalden, Glarus, Zug, Basel-City and Geneva – have always existed without the district level of government. An eighth one, Appenzell Innerrhoden, uses no intermediate level either, but calls its lowest-level subdivisions Bezirke, although they are functionally equivalent to municipalities elsewhere.

A further number of cantons are considering (or have already decided) an abolition of the district level in the future. Appenzell Ausserrhoden, Schaffhausen, Lucerne, St. Gallen and Schwyz voted in 2006 on its abolition; some voted in favour of keeping the division, some with modifications. Bern in 2006 decided a reduction of its 26 districts to 10 districts to be overseen by 5 regions, which took effect in 2010. St. Gallen, Solothurn and Lucerne removed the administrative role, but retained districts for elections. In 2008 Vaud decided on a reduction from 19 to 10 districts, followed by Thurgau which combined eight into five in 2012. In 2017 Grisons replaced the 11 districts with 11 regions. In 2018 Neuchâtel eliminated the district level.

== Zurich ==
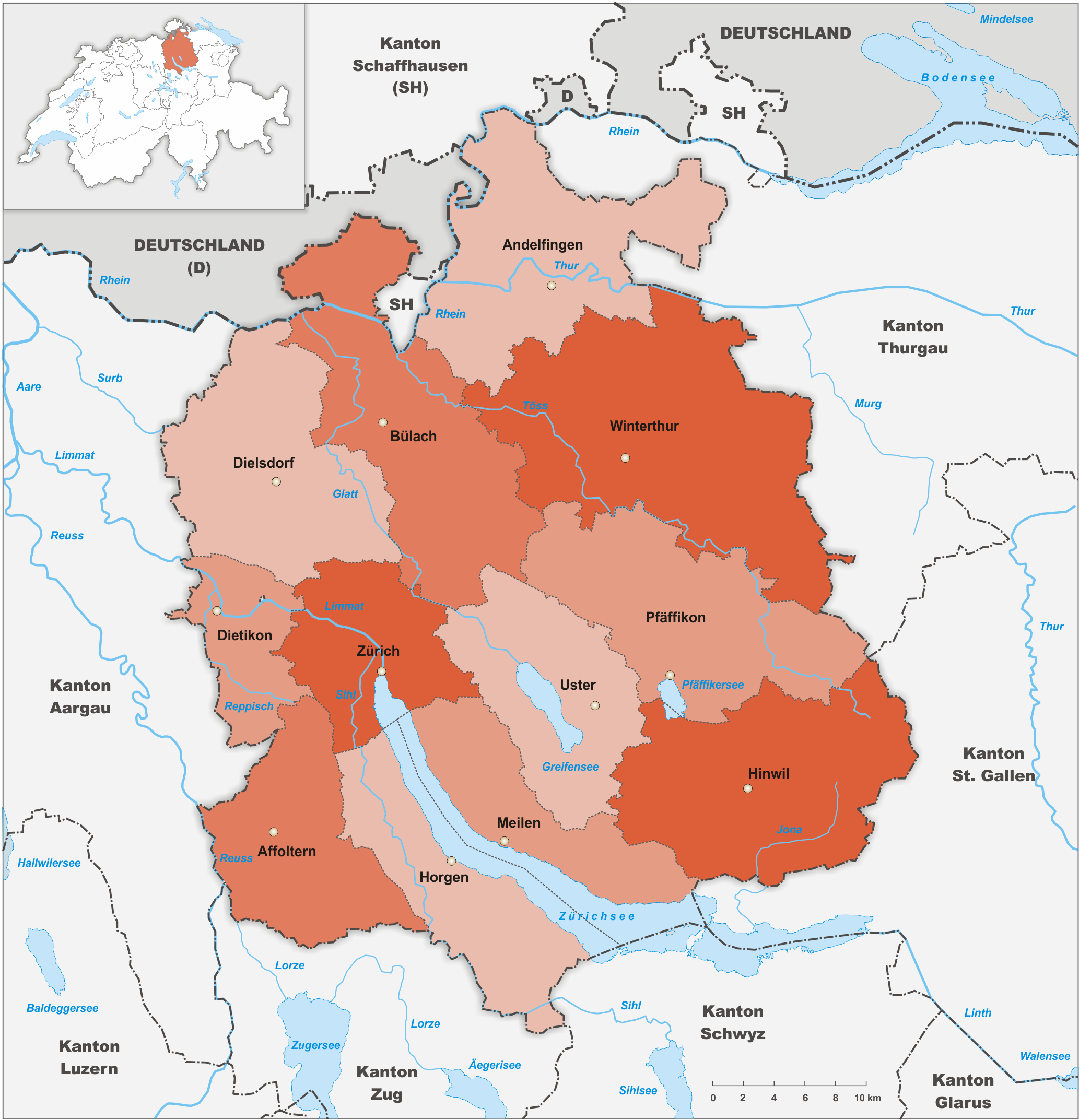
Districts in the Canton of Zürich

The canton of Zurich is divided into 12 districts (German: Bezirke):

- Affoltern with capital Affoltern am Albis
- Andelfingen with capital Andelfingen
- Bülach with capital Bülach
- Dielsdorf with capital Dielsdorf
- Dietikon with capital Dietikon
- Hinwil with capital Hinwil
- Horgen with capital Horgen
- Meilen with capital Meilen
- Pfäffikon with capital Pfäffikon
- Uster with capital Uster
- Winterthur with capital Winterthur
- Zurich comprises the city of Zurich

== Bern ==
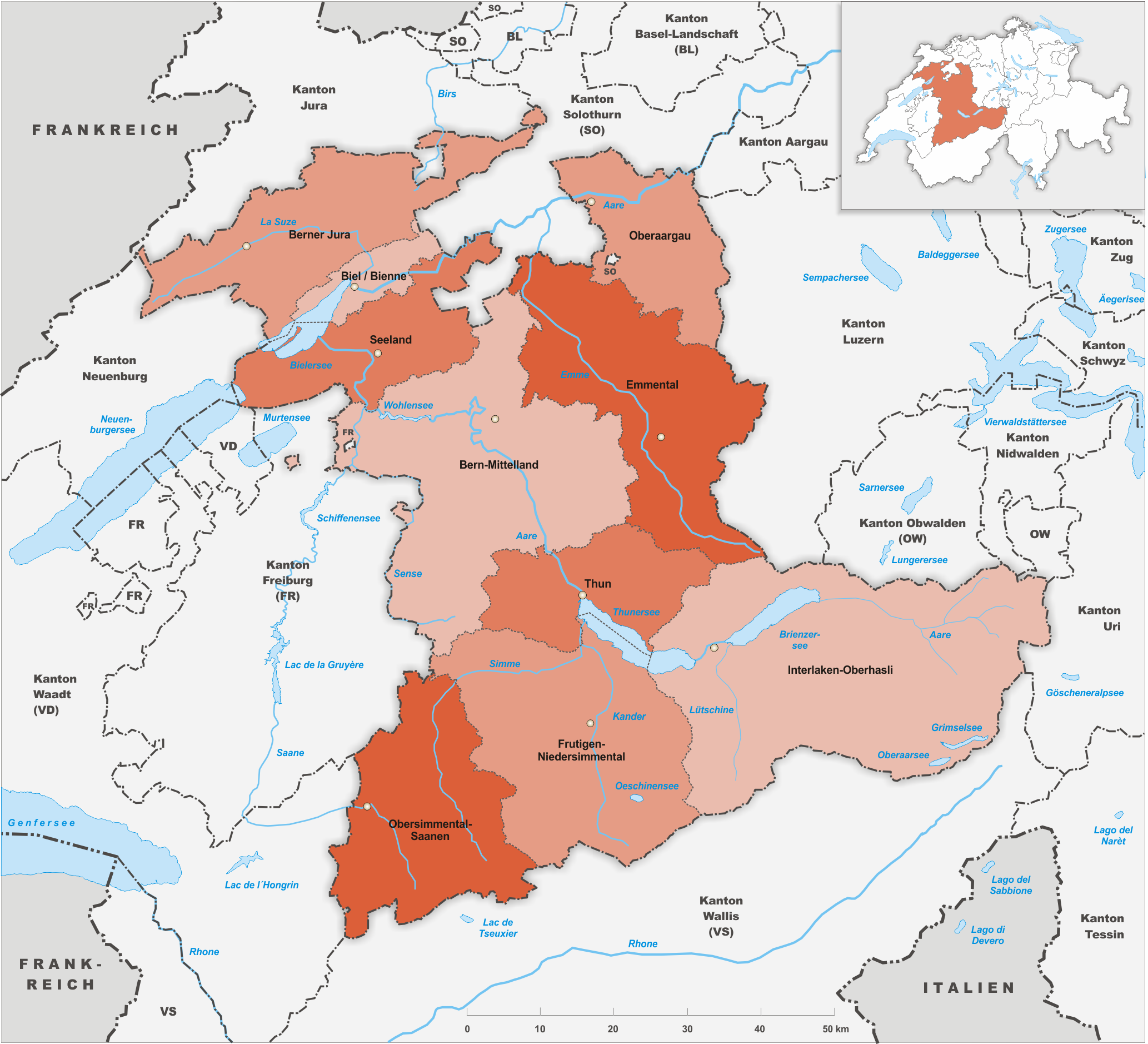
Districts of the canton of Bern

The Canton of Bern is divided in five regions: Berner Jura, Seeland (with two precincts, Biel/Bienne and Seeland), Bern-Mittelland, Oberland (with precincts Thun, Obersimmental-Saanen, Frutigen-Niedersimmental, Interlaken-Oberhasli) and Emmental-Oberaargau (with two precincts, Emmental and Oberaargau) The current division has taken effect on 1 January 2010, based on a 2006 decision to abolish the former system of districts.

On 1 January 2010, the 26 administrative districts (Amtsbezirke) lost their administrative role that was transferred to 10 new administrative districts (Verwaltungskreise):

- Bern-Mittelland with capital Ostermundigen, made up of all or part of the former districts of Bern, Fraubrunnen, Konolfingen, Laupen, Schwarzenburg and Seftigen
- Biel/Bienne with capital Biel/Bienne, made up of all of the former district of Biel and about half of the former district of Nidau
- Emmental with capital Langnau im Emmental, made up of all or part of the former districts of Burgdorf, Signau and Trachselwald
- Frutigen-Niedersimmental with capital Frutigen, made up of all or part of the former districts of Frutigen and Niedersimmental
- Interlaken-Oberhasli with capital Interlaken, made up of all or part of the former districts of Interlaken and Oberhasli
- Jura bernois with capital Courtelary, made up of all or part of the former districts of Courtelary, Moutier and La Neuveville
- Oberaargau with capital Wangen an der Aare, made up of all or part of the former districts of Aarwangen and Wangen
- Obersimmental-Saanen with capital Saanen, made up of all of the former districts of Obersimmental and Saanen
- Seeland with capital Aarberg, made up of all or part of the former districts of Aarberg, Büren, Erlach and Nidau
- Thun with capital Thun, made up of all of the former administrative district of Thun

Nota bene that the 26 Bernese districts do still formally exist and are maintained by Article 38 of the Law on the Organisation of the Executive Council and the Administration (Organization Law, LOCA/OrG) and by Article 3 al.2 of the cantonal Constitution.

== Lucerne ==
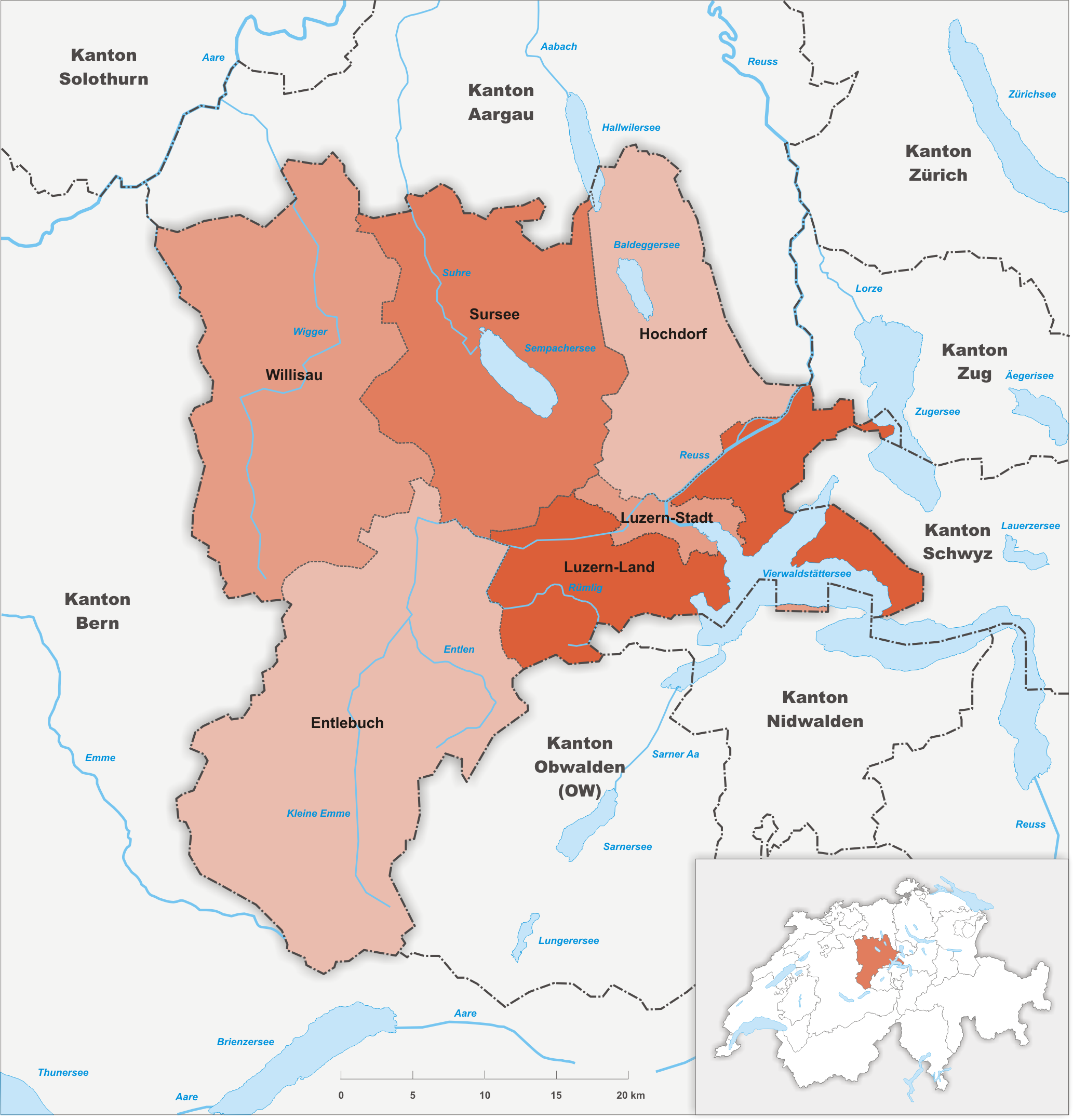
Districts of Canton Lucerne

The Canton of Lucerne used to be divided into 5 Ämter:

- Entlebuch with capital Schüpfheim
- Hochdorf with capital Hochdorf
- Luzern with capital Luzern
- Sursee with capital Sursee
- Willisau with capital Willisau

These were abolished with the new cantonal constitution of 2007, although they will continue to be used as electoral districts.

== Schwyz ==
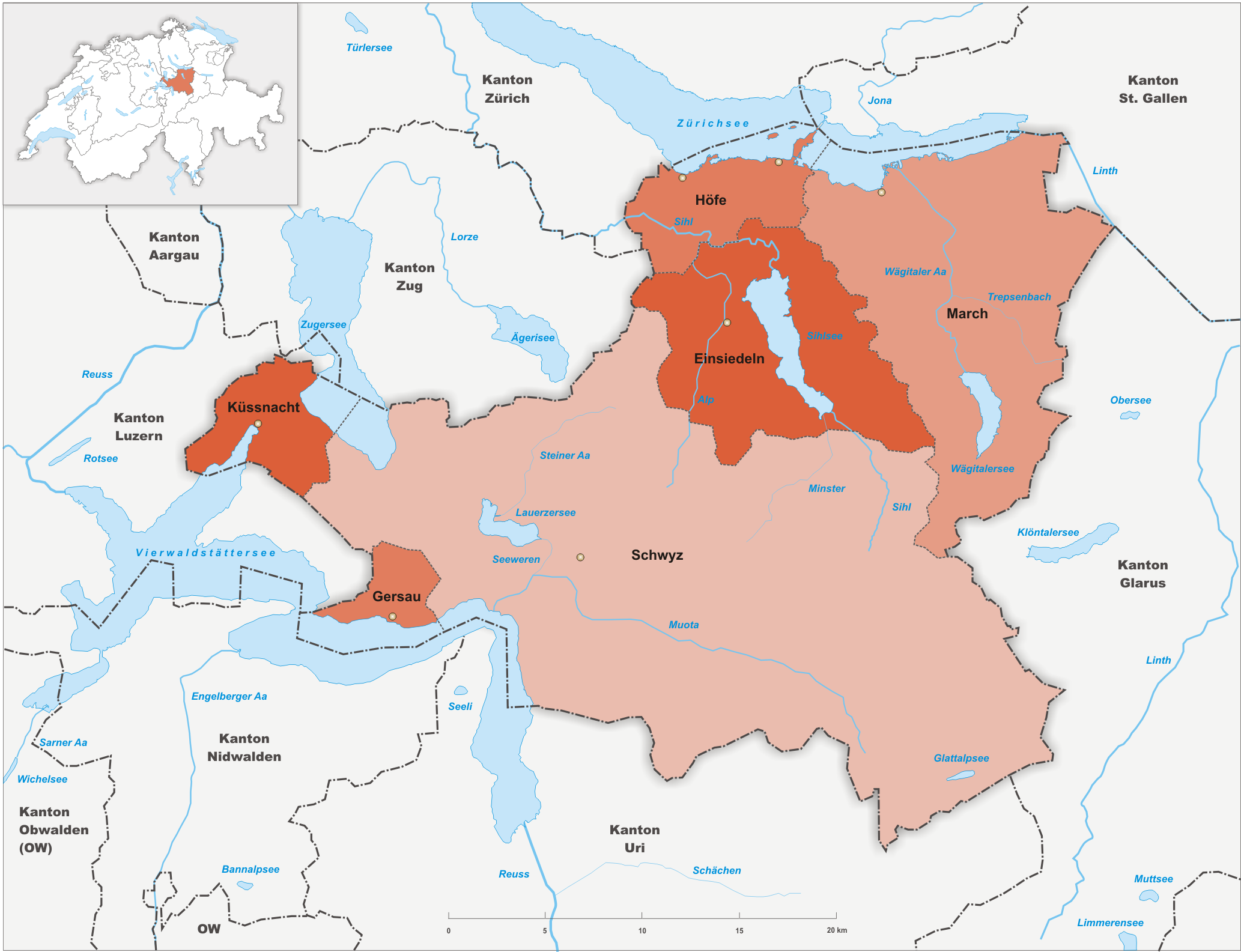
Districts of the Cantons of Schwyz

The Canton of Schwyz is divided into 6 districts:

- Einsiedeln including only the municipality of the same name
- Gersau including only the municipality of the same name
- Höfe with capital alternating between Wollerau and the village of Pfäffikon
- Küssnacht including only the municipality of the same name
- March with capital Lachen
- Schwyz with capital Schwyz

== Fribourg ==
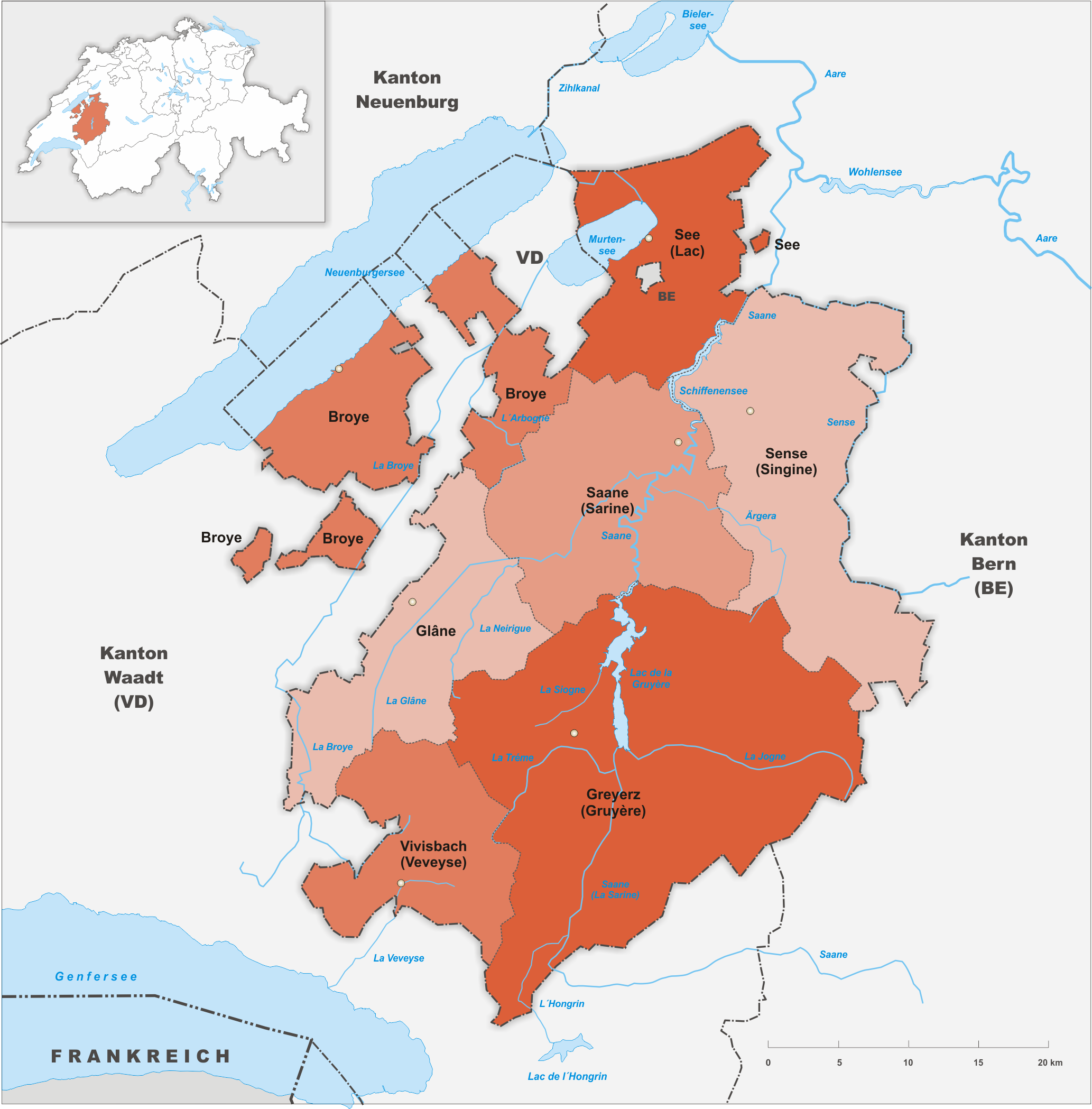
Districts of canton Fribourg

The Canton of Fribourg is divided into 7 districts:

- Broye with capital Estavayer-le-Lac
- Glâne with capital Romont
- Gruyère with capital Bulle
- Sarine with capital Fribourg
- See/Lac with capital Murten/Morat
- Sense with capital Tafers
- Veveyse with capital Châtel-Saint-Denis

== Solothurn ==
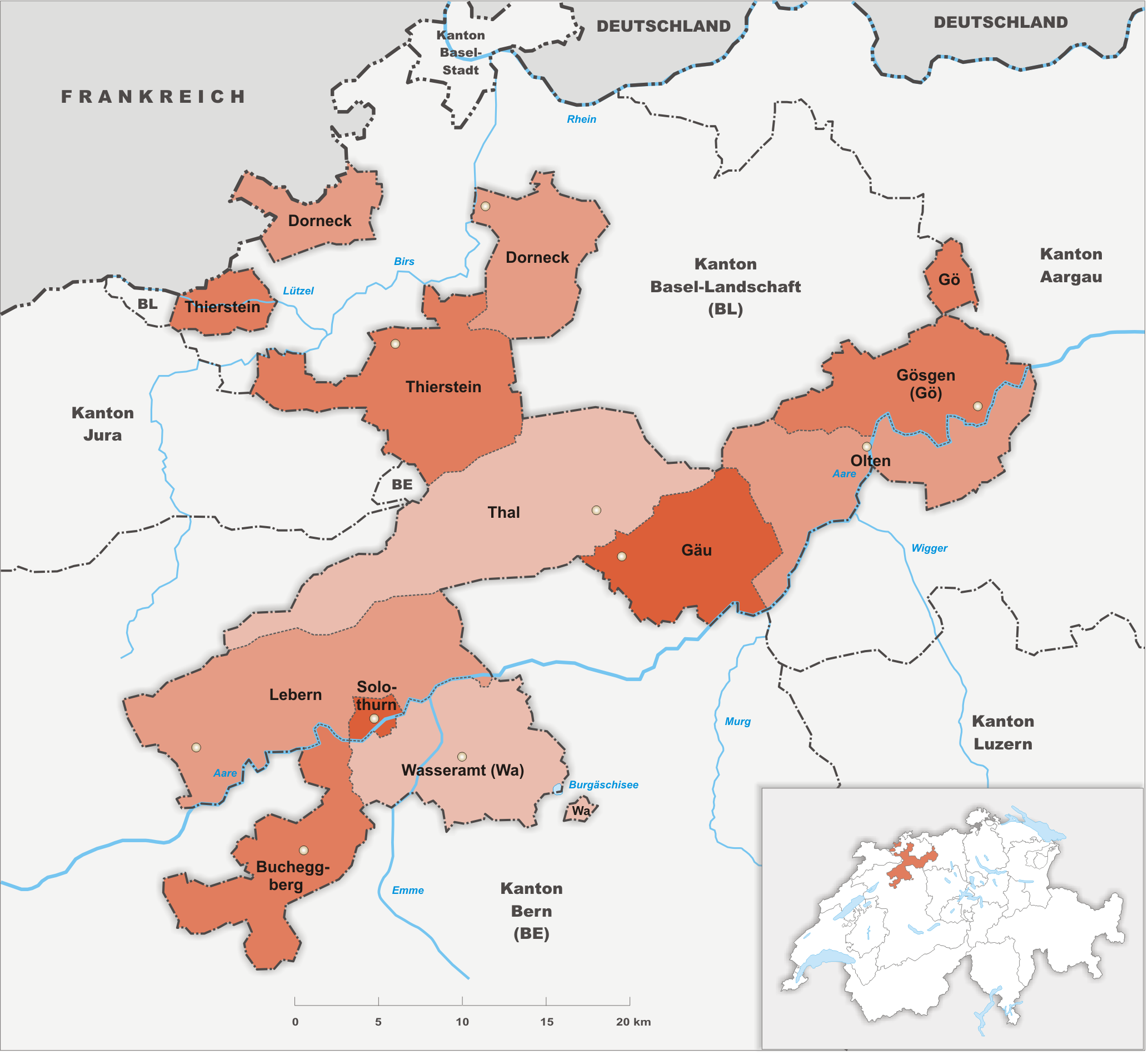
Districts of Canton Solothurn

In 2005 Solothurn's ten districts merged pairwise into five electoral districts, termed Amtei. Since 2005, districts only have a statistical meaning.

- Bucheggberg, Amtei Wasseramt-Bucheggberg
- Dorneck, Amtei Dorneck-Thierstein (unofficially Schwarzbubenland)
- Gäu, Amtei Thal-Gäu
- Gösgen, Amtei Olten-Gösgen (unofficially Niederamt)
- Lebern, Amtei Solothurn-Lebern
- Olten, Amtei Olten-Gösgen
- Solothurn, Amtei Solothurn-Lebern
- Thal, Amtei Thal-Gäu
- Thierstein, Amtei Dorneck-Thierstein
- Wasseramt, Amtei Wasseramt-Bucheggberg

== Basel-Landschaft ==
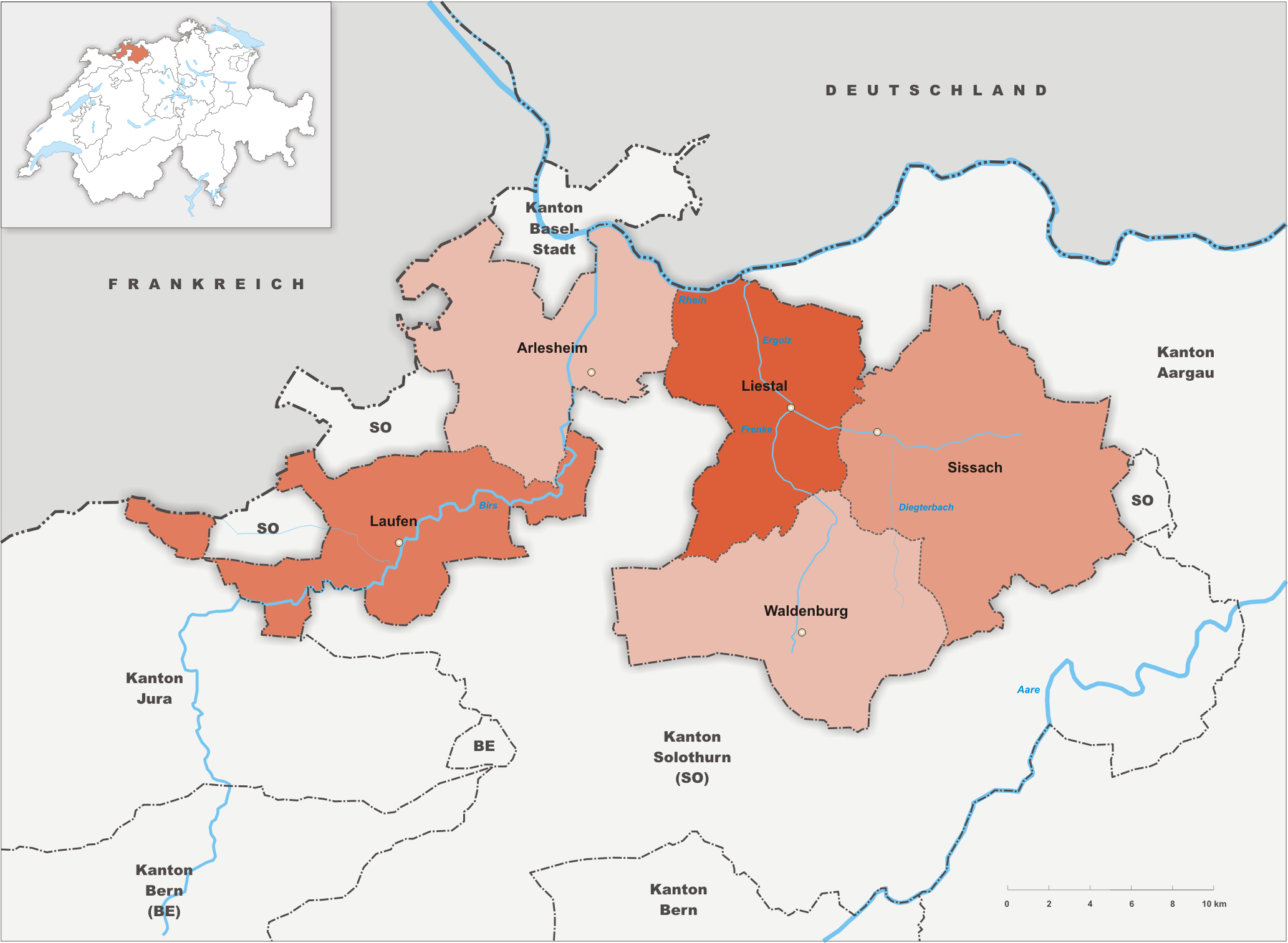
districts of Canton Basel-Landschaft

Basel-Landschaft is divided into 5 districts:

- Arlesheim with capital Arlesheim
- Laufen with capital Laufen
- Liestal with capital Liestal
- Sissach with capital Sissach
- Waldenburg with capital Waldenburg

== St. Gallen ==
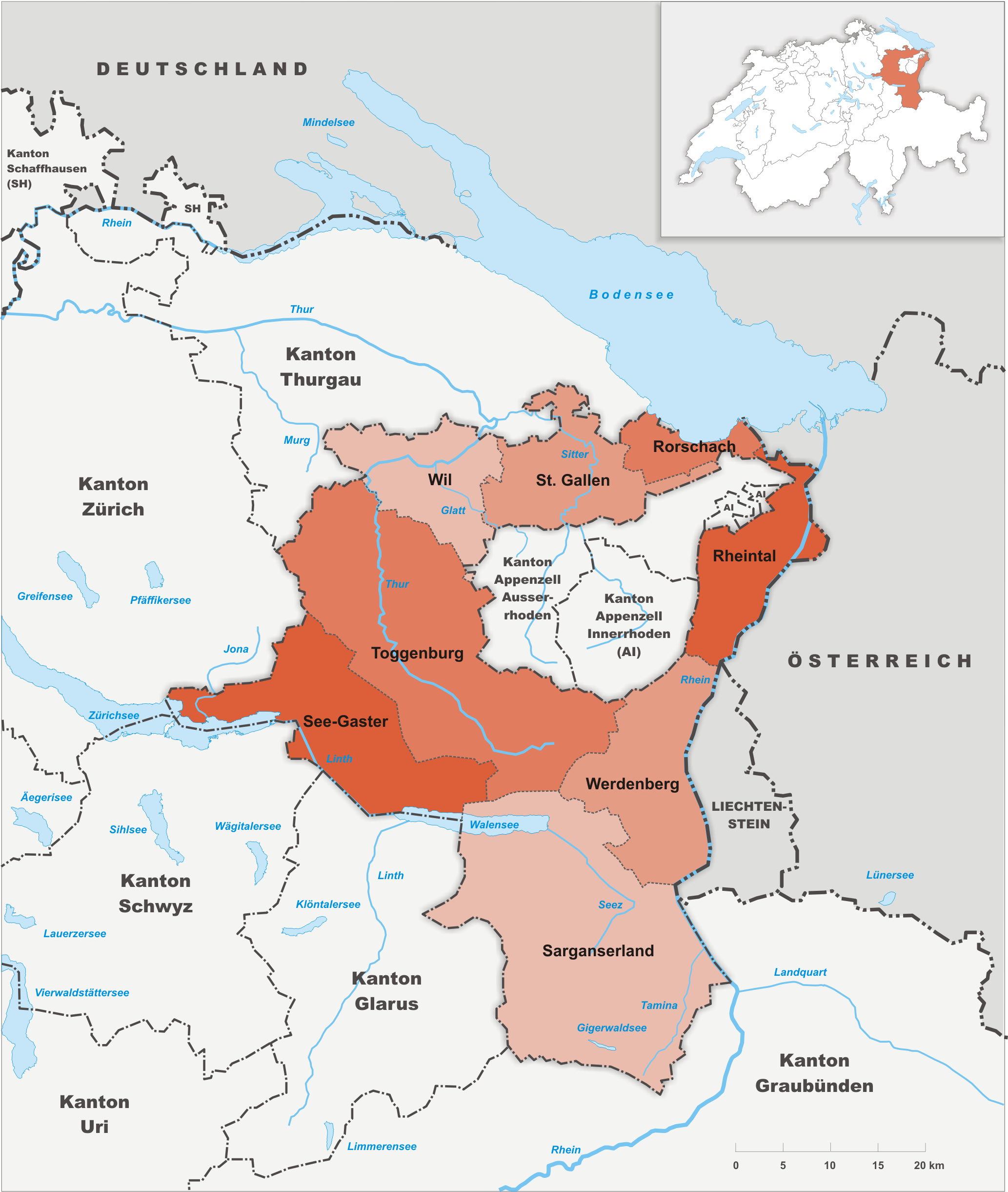
Constituencies of St. Gallen

The canton abolished the district level in 2003, but it remains divided into eight constituencies (Wahlkreise) without administrative significance:

- Rheintal with capital Altstätten
- Rorschach with capital Rorschach
- Sarganserland with capital Sargans
- See-Gaster with capital Rapperswil-Jona
- St. Gallen with capital St. Gallen
- Toggenburg with capital Lichtensteig
- Werdenberg with capital Buchs
- Wil with capital Wil

== Grisons ==
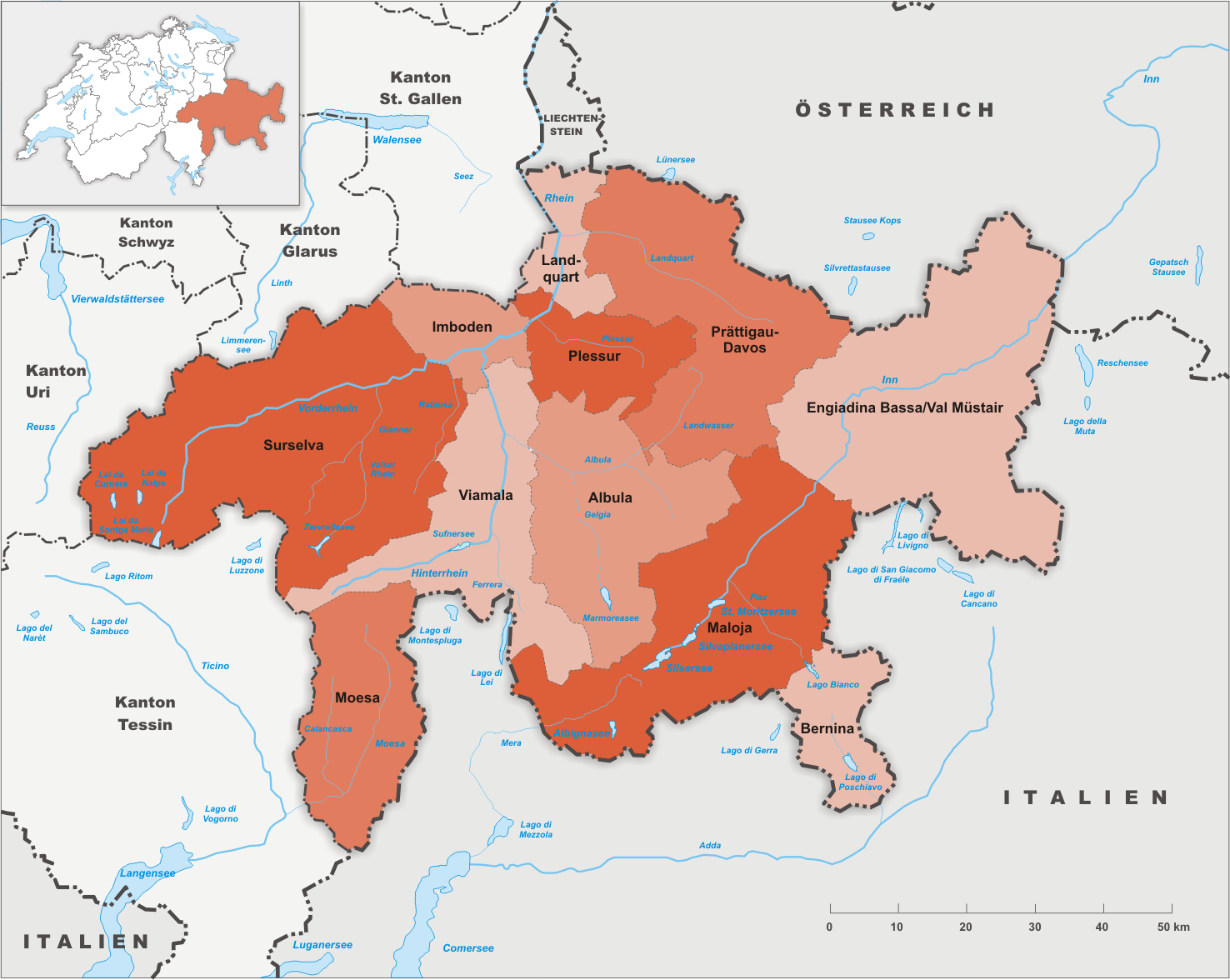
Regions of Canton of the Grisons

Since 2017 Grisons (Graubünden) is divided into 11 regions:

- Albula
- Bernina
- Engiadina Bassa/Val Müstair
- Imboden
- Landquart
- Maloja
- Moesa
- Plessur
- Prättigau/Davos
- Surselva
- Viamala

== Aargau ==
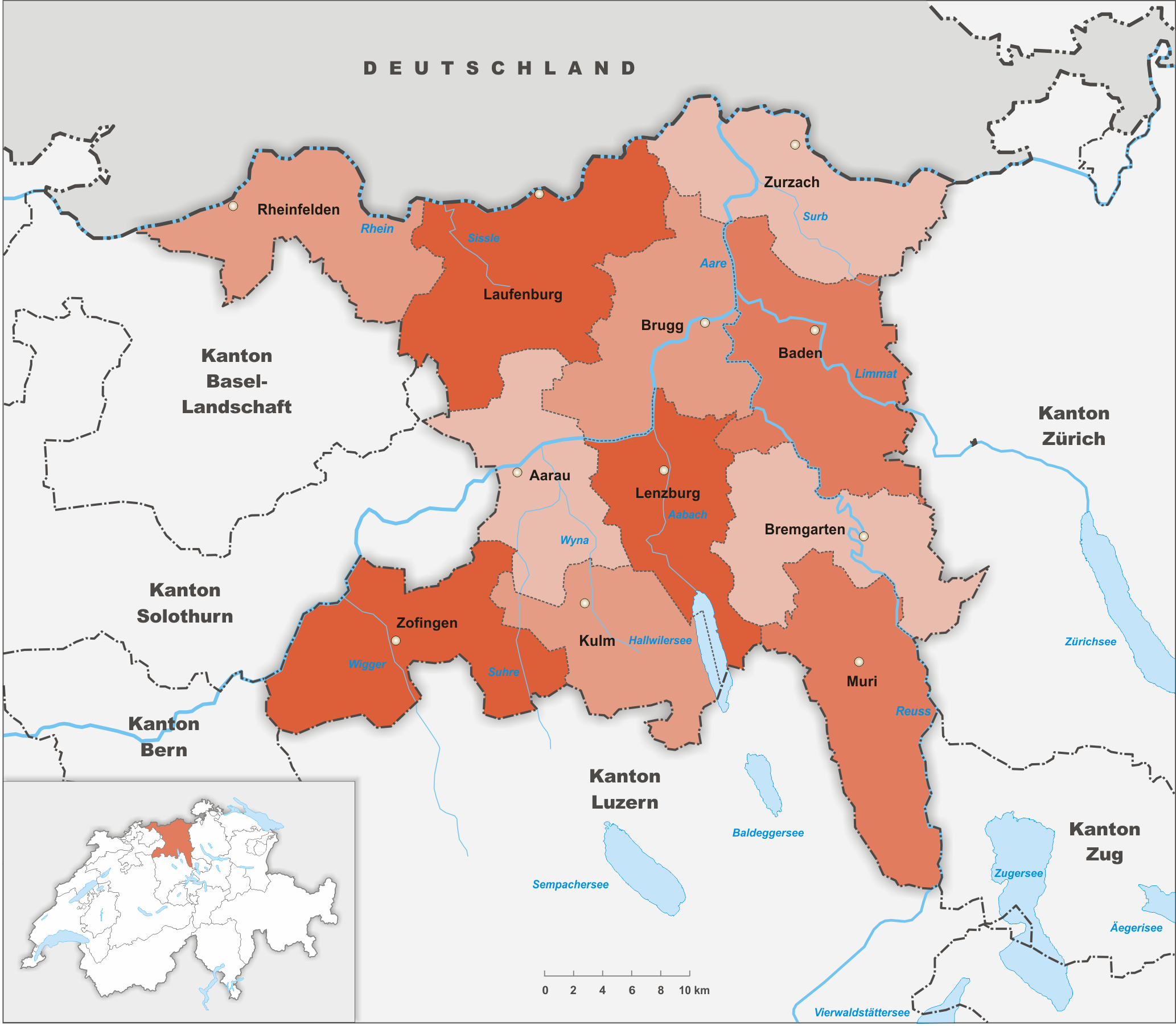
Districts in Aargau

Aargau is divided into 11 districts:

- Aarau with capital Aarau
- Baden with capital Baden
- Bremgarten with capital Bremgarten
- Brugg with capital Brugg
- Kulm with capital Unterkulm
- Laufenburg with capital Laufenburg
- Lenzburg with capital Lenzburg
- Muri with capital Muri
- Rheinfelden with capital Rheinfelden
- Zofingen with capital Zofingen
- Zurzach with capital Zurzach

== Thurgau ==
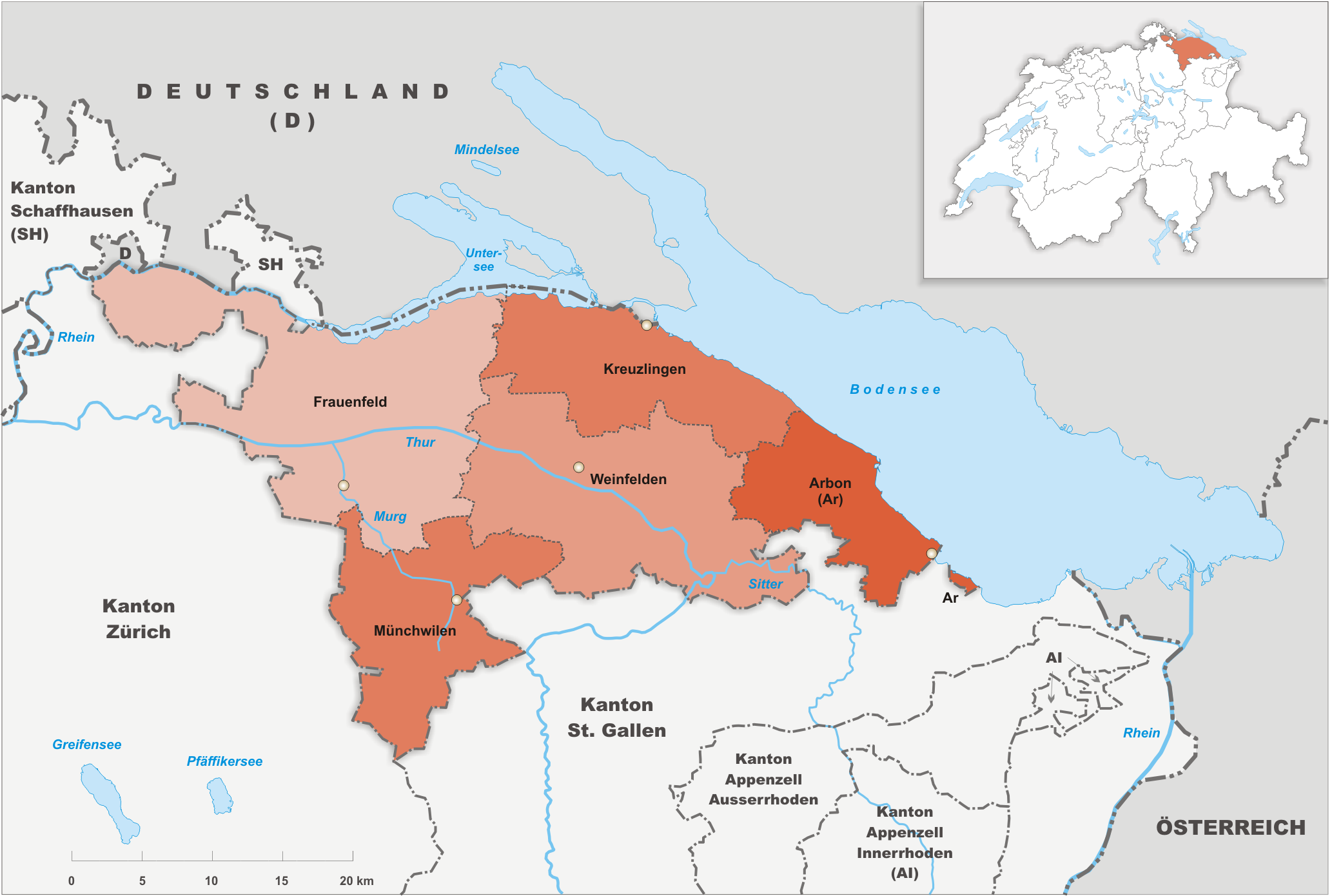
Districts of Canton Thurgau

Thurgau is divided into five districts (eight prior to 2011) and each is named after its capital:

- Arbon with capital Arbon
- Frauenfeld with capital Frauenfeld
- Kreuzlingen with capital Kreuzlingen
- Münchwilen with capital Münchwilen
- Weinfelden with capital Weinfelden

== Ticino ==
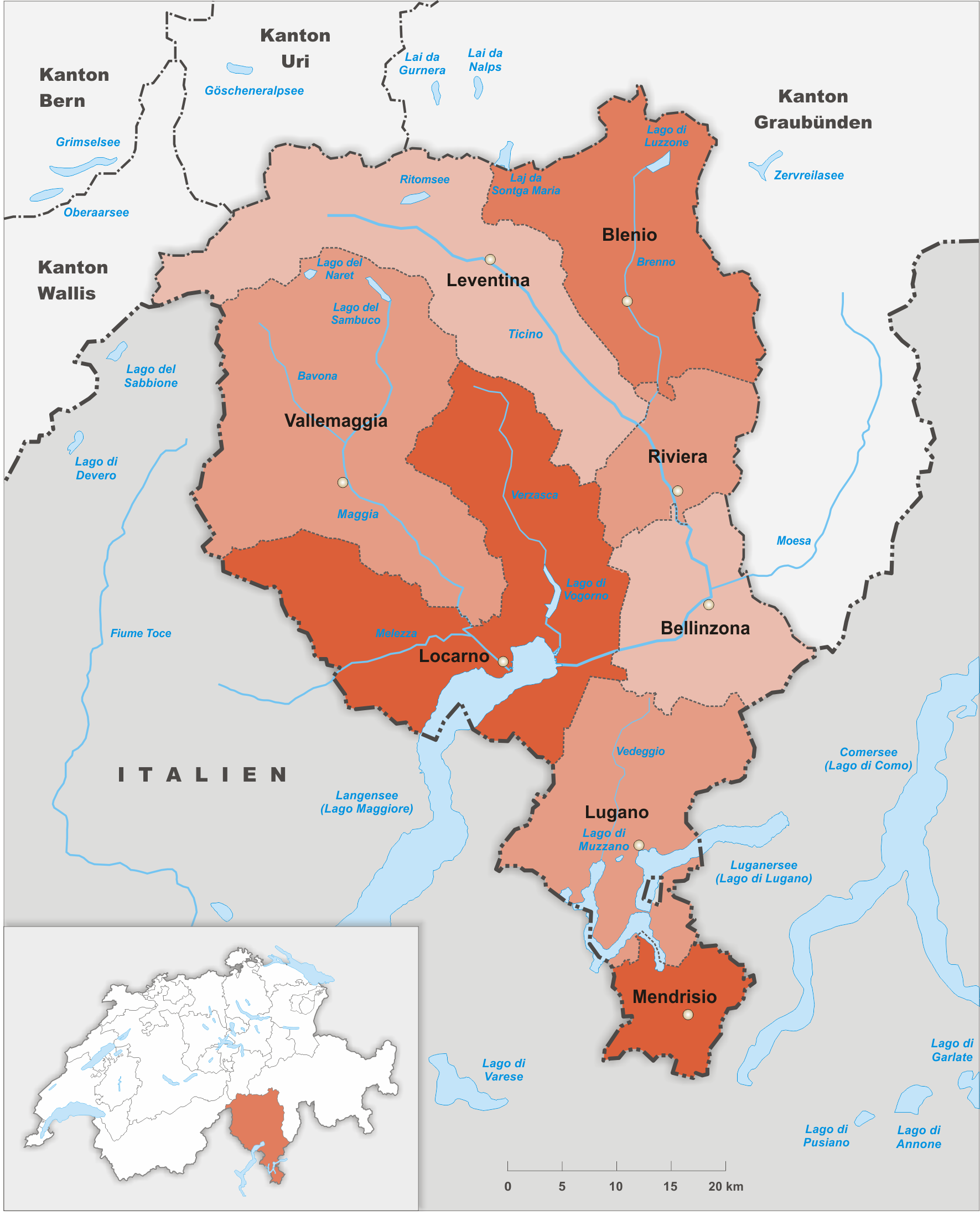
Districts of Canton Ticino

Ticino is divided into 8 districts:

- Bellinzona with capital Bellinzona
- Blenio with capital Acquarossa
- Leventina with capital Faido
- Locarno with capital Locarno
- Lugano with capital Lugano
- Mendrisio with capital Mendrisio
- Riviera with capital Riviera
- Vallemaggia with capital Cevio

== Vaud ==
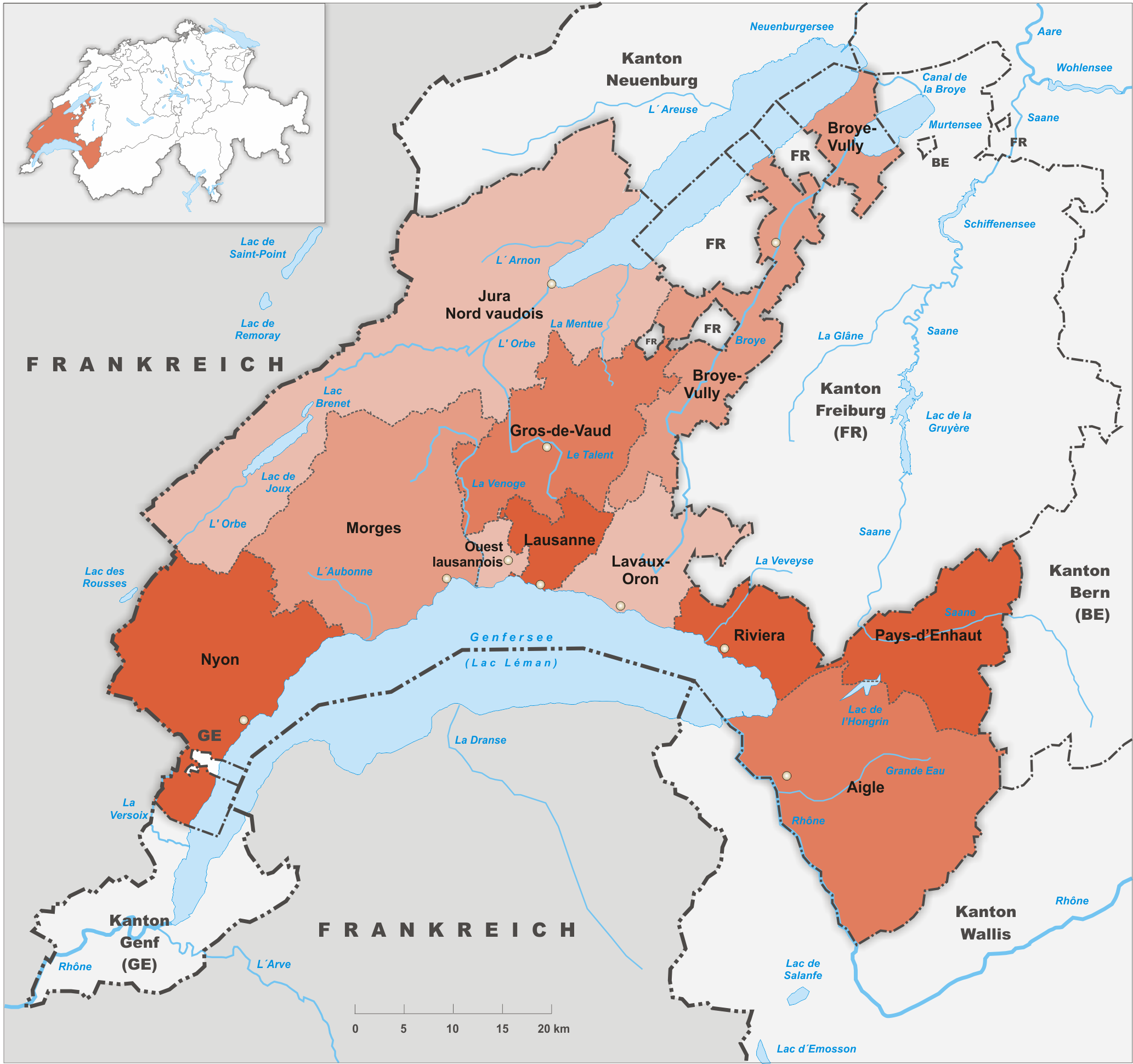
Districts of Canton Vaud

Vaud is divided into 10 districts:

- Aigle with capital Aigle
- Broye-Vully with capital Payerne
- Gros-de-Vaud with capital Echallens
- Jura-North Vaudois with capital Yverdon-les-Bains
- Lausanne with capital Lausanne
- Lavaux-Oron with capital Cully
- Morges with capital Morges
- Nyon with capital Nyon
- Riviera-Pays-d'Enhaut with capital Vevey
- Ouest Lausannois with capital Renens

== Valais ==
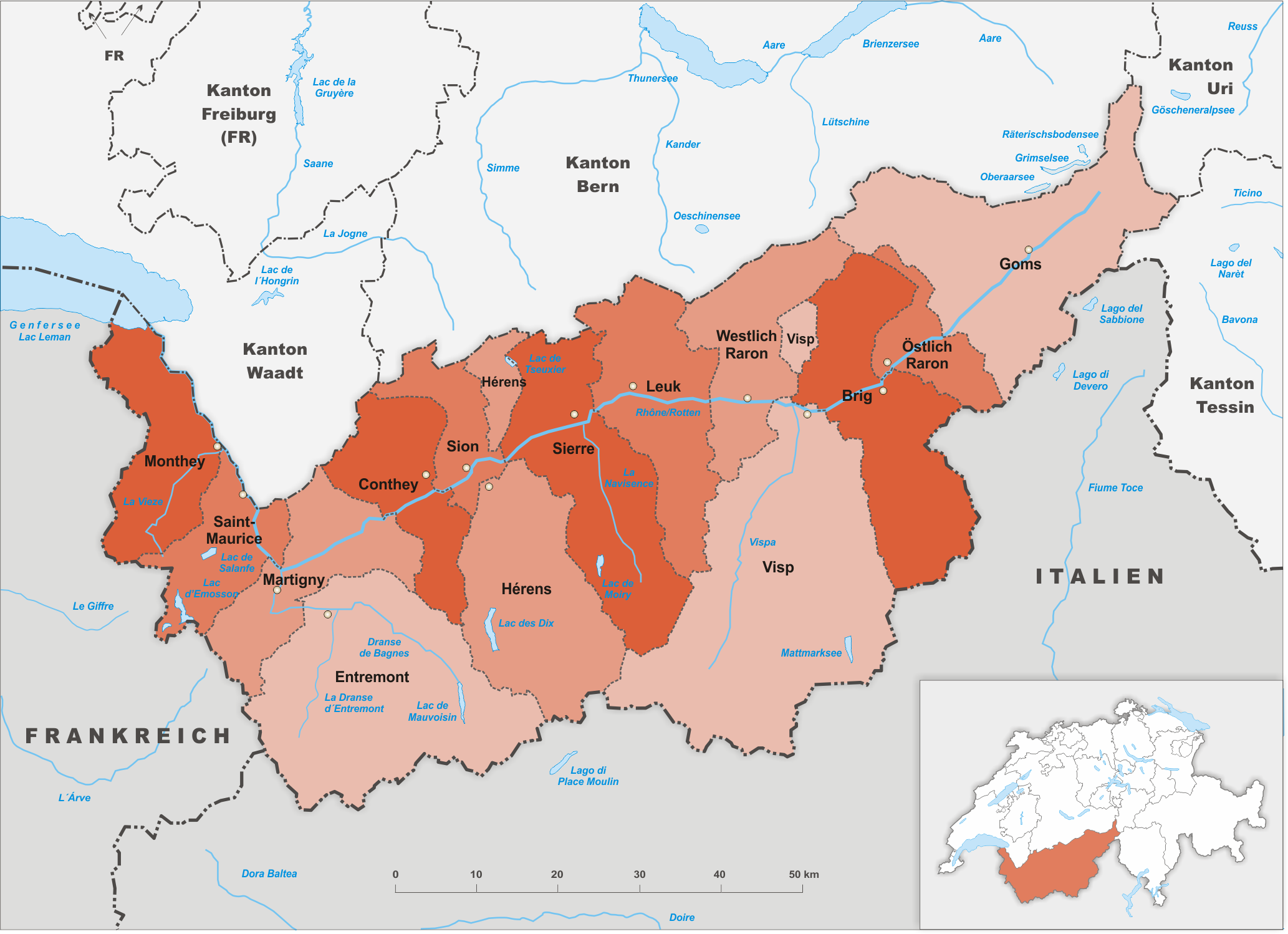
Districts in Valais

Valais is divided into 13 districts:

- Brig with capital Brig-Glis
- Conthey with capital Conthey
- Entremont with capital Sembrancher
- Goms with capital Münster-Geschinen
- Hérens with capital Evolène
- Leuk with capital Leuk
- Martigny with capital Martigny
- Monthey with capital Monthey
- Saint-Maurice with capital Saint-Maurice
- Sierre with capital Sierre
- Sion with capital Sion
- Visp with capital Visp

The district of Raron is divided into:

- Östlich Raron with capital Mörel-Filet
- Westlich Raron with capital Raron

== Neuchâtel ==
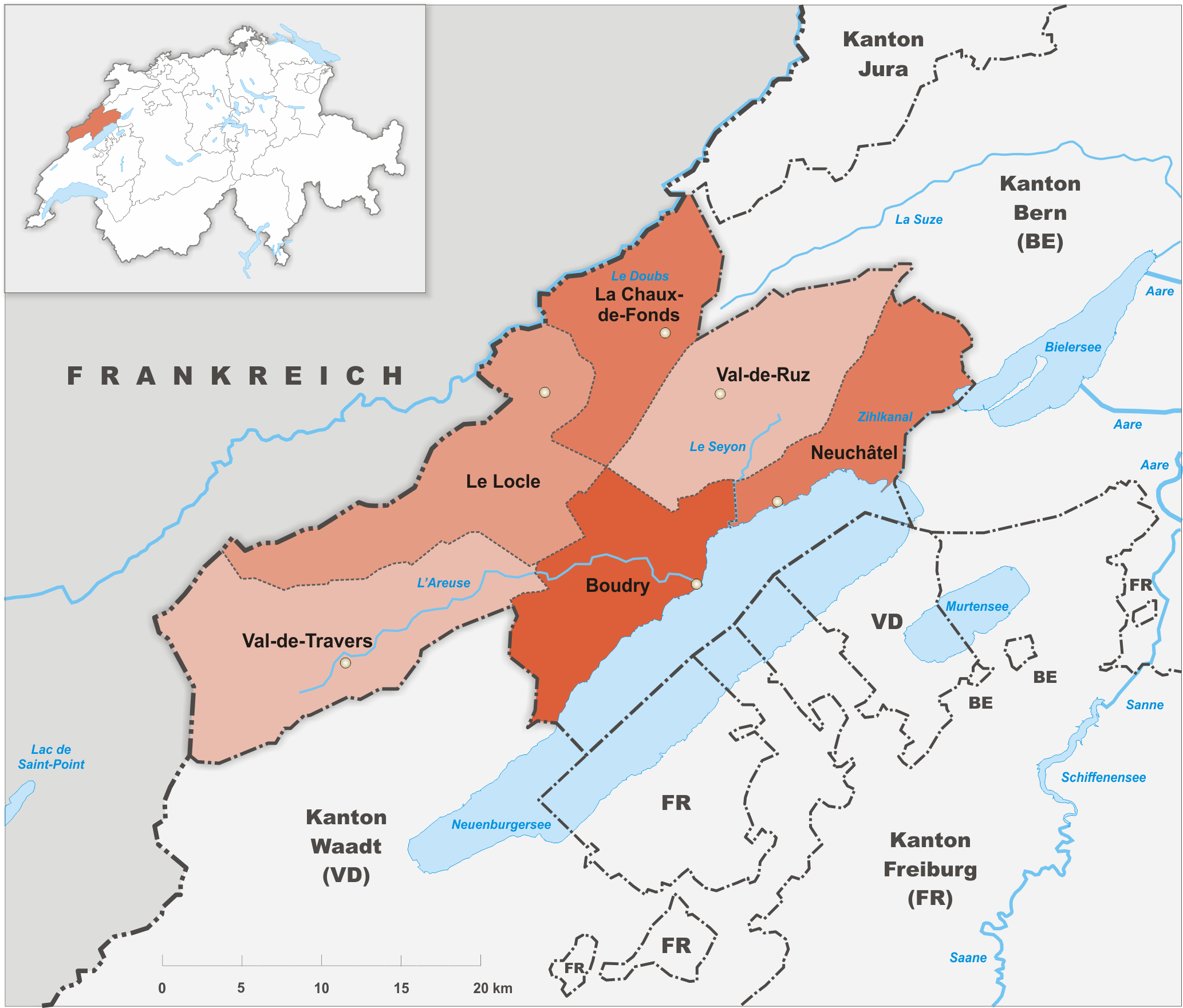
Districts of Canton Neuchâtel

The Canton of Neuchâtel was divided into 6 districts until 1 January 2018 when the district system was terminated.

- Boudry with capital Boudry
- La Chaux-de-Fonds with capital La Chaux-de-Fonds
- Le Locle with capital Le Locle
- Neuchâtel with capital Neuchâtel
- Val-de-Ruz with capital Cernier
- Val-de-Travers with capital Val-de-Travers

== Jura ==
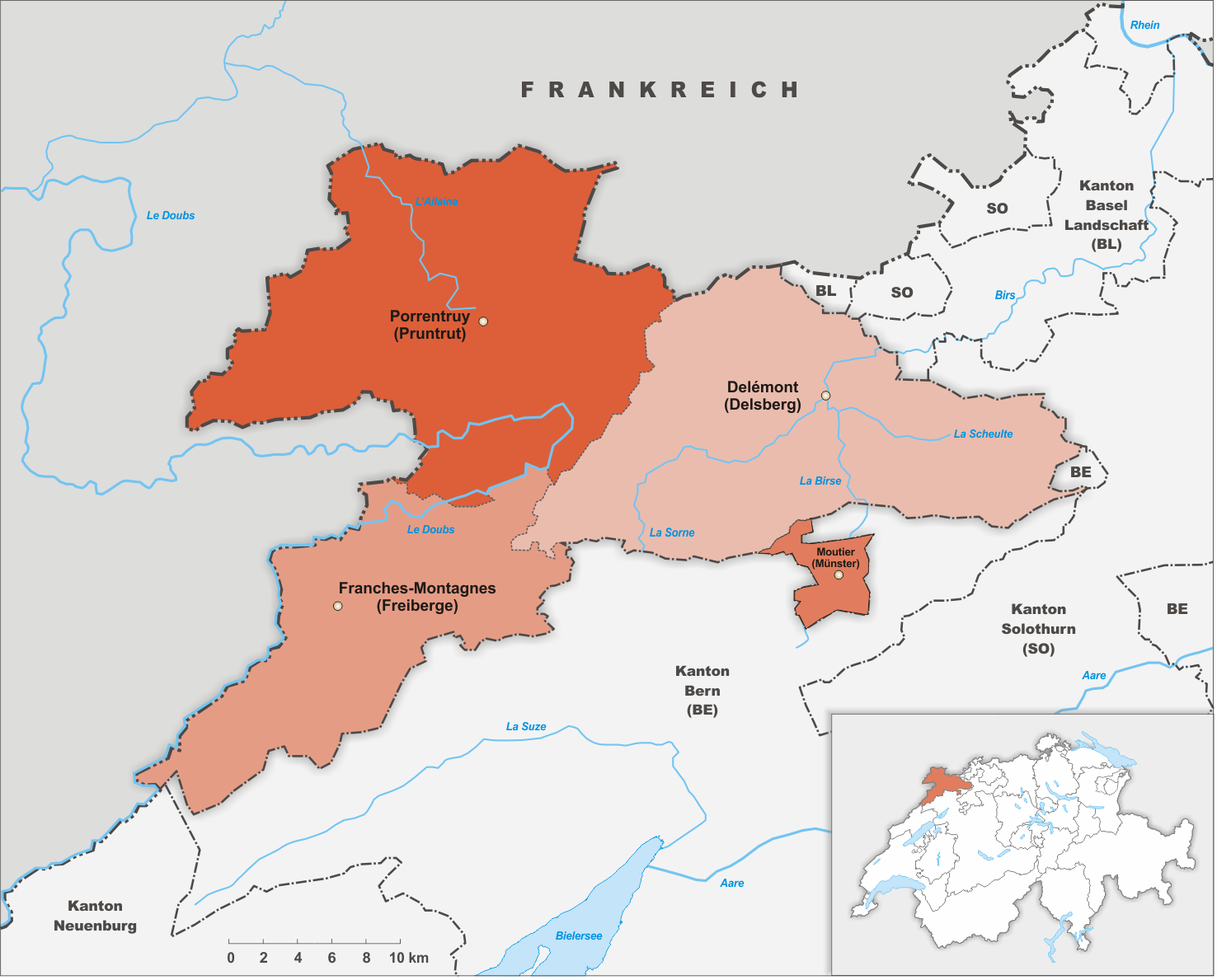
Districts in Canton of Jura

The Canton of Jura is divided into 4 districts:

- Delémont with capital Delémont
- Porrentruy with capital Porrentruy
- Franches-Montagnes with capital Saignelégier
- Moutier District with capital Moutier

== Schaffhausen ==
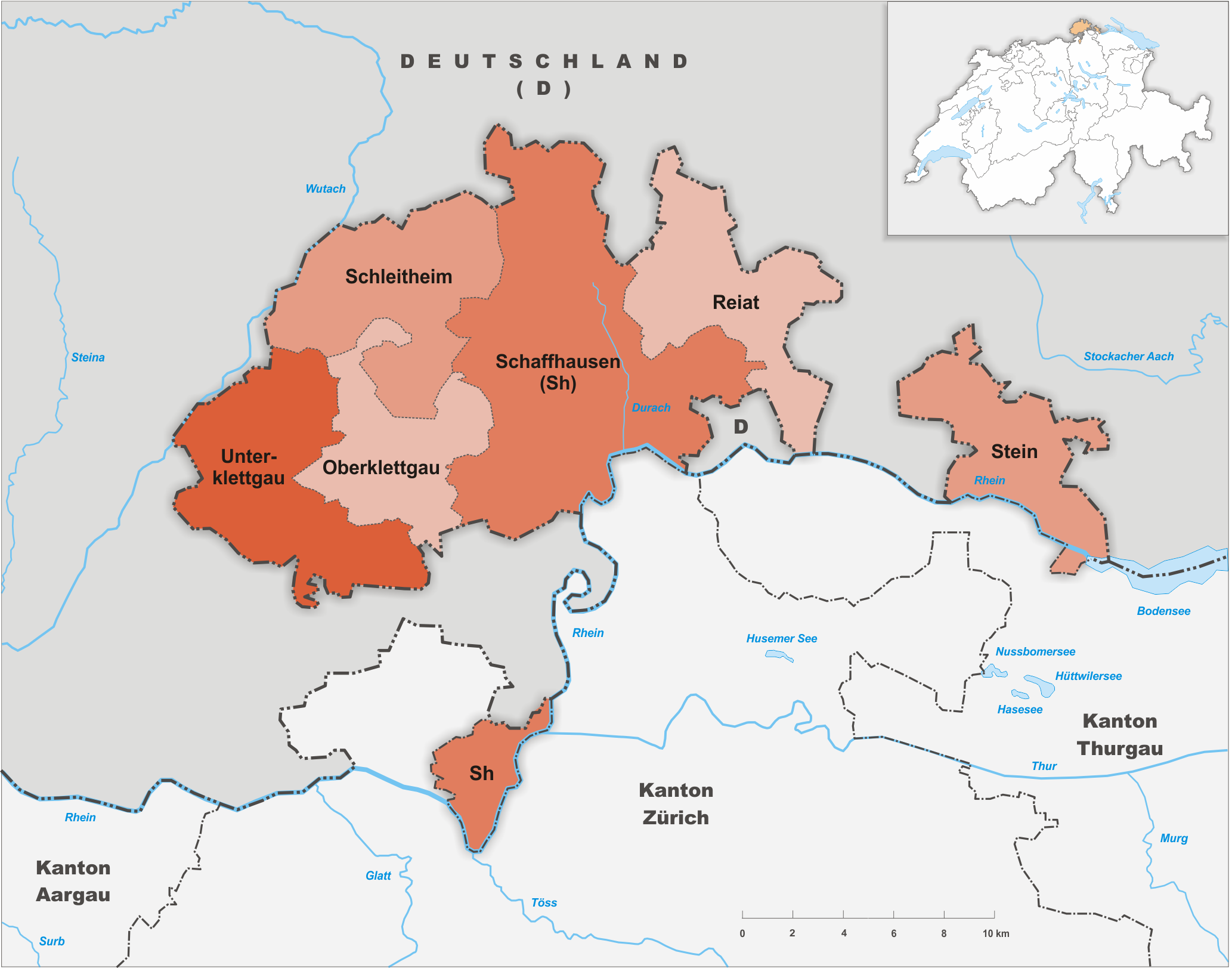
Districts in Canton of Schaffhausen

The Canton of Schaffhausen is divided into 6 districts:

- Stein with capital Stein am Rhein
- Schaffhausen with capital Schaffhausen
- Schleitheim with capital Schleitheim
- Oberklettgau with capital Neunkirch
- Unterklettgau with capital Hallau
- Reiat with capital Thayngen

== Appenzell Ausserrhoden ==
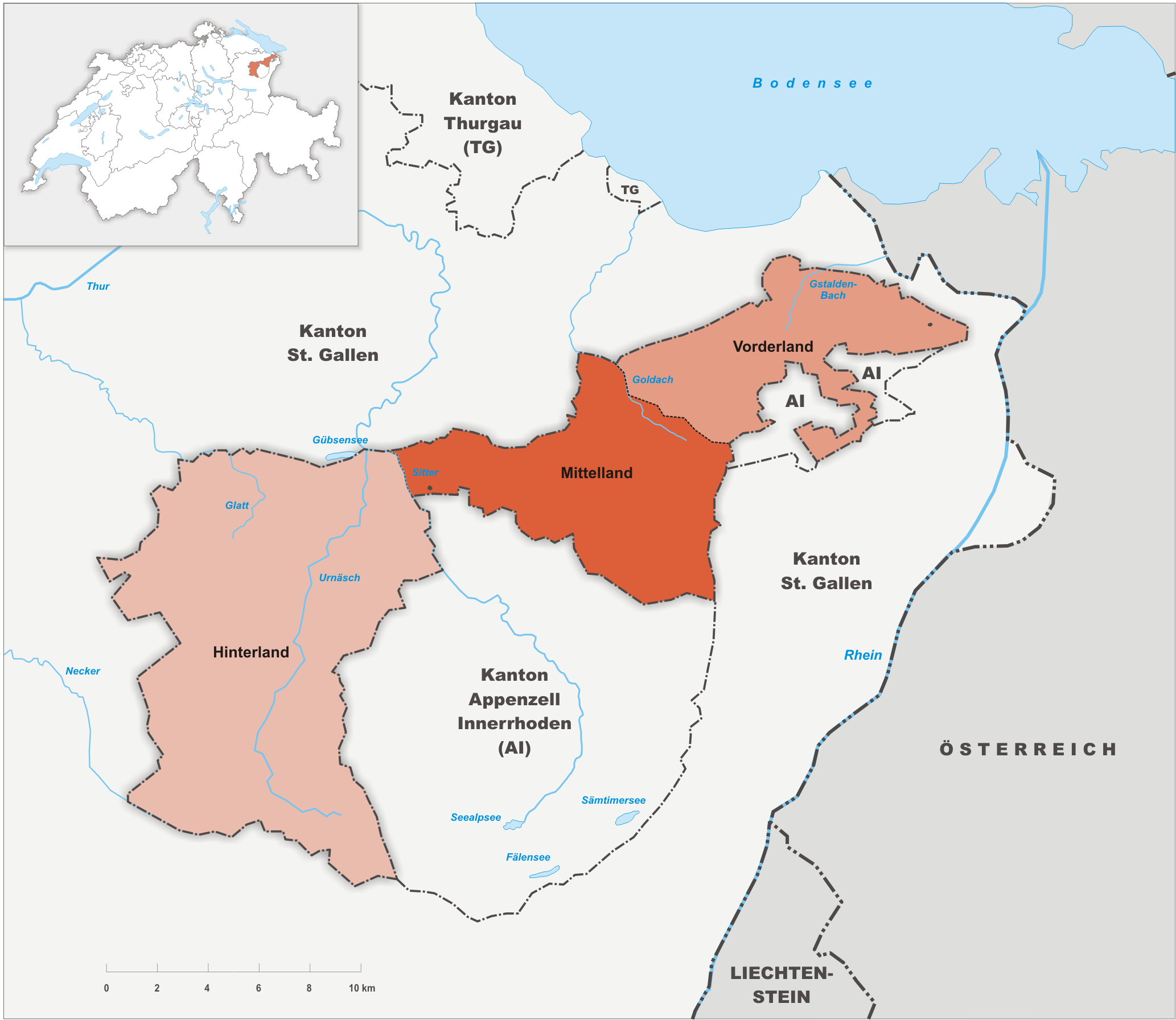
Districts of Appenzell Ausserrhoden

The Canton of Appenzell Ausserrhoden is divided into 3 districts:

- Hinterland with capital Herisau
- Mittelland with capital Trogen
- Vorderland with capital Heiden

== Appenzell Innerrhoden ==
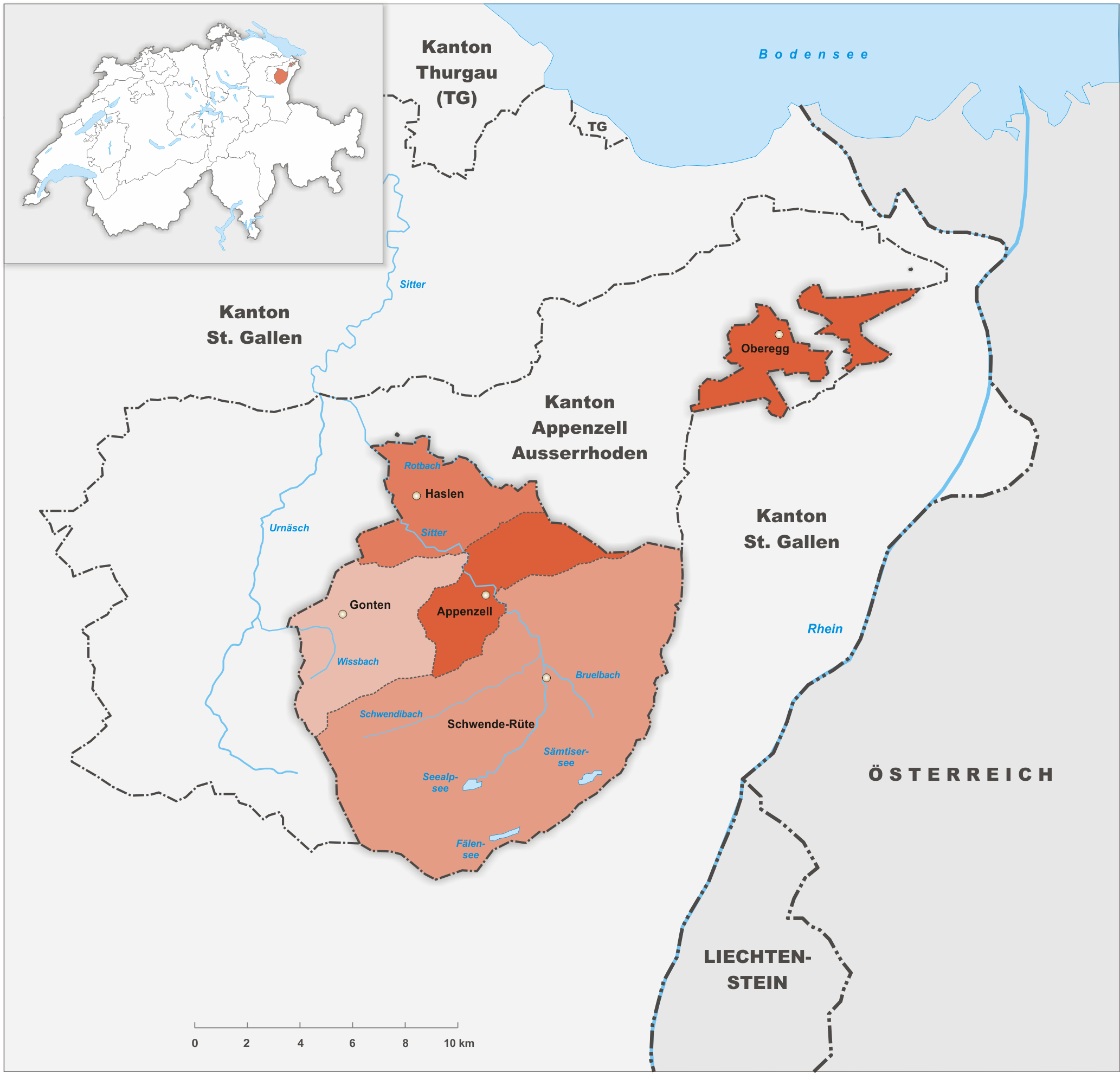
Districts of Appenzell Innerrhoden

In Appenzell Innerrhoden districts are the lowest administrative division as the canton has no municipalities (except for the Feuerschaugemeinde, a special-purpose municipality for the town of Appenzell). The districts are functionally equivalent to municipalities elsewhere in Switzerland, and are generally shown as municipalities on maps etc.

The Canton is divided into five districts:

- Appenzell with capital Appenzell
- Gonten
- Oberegg
- Schlatt-Haslen
- Schwende-Rüte with capital Appenzell

== See also ==
- Municipalities of Switzerland
- Spatial planning in Switzerland
