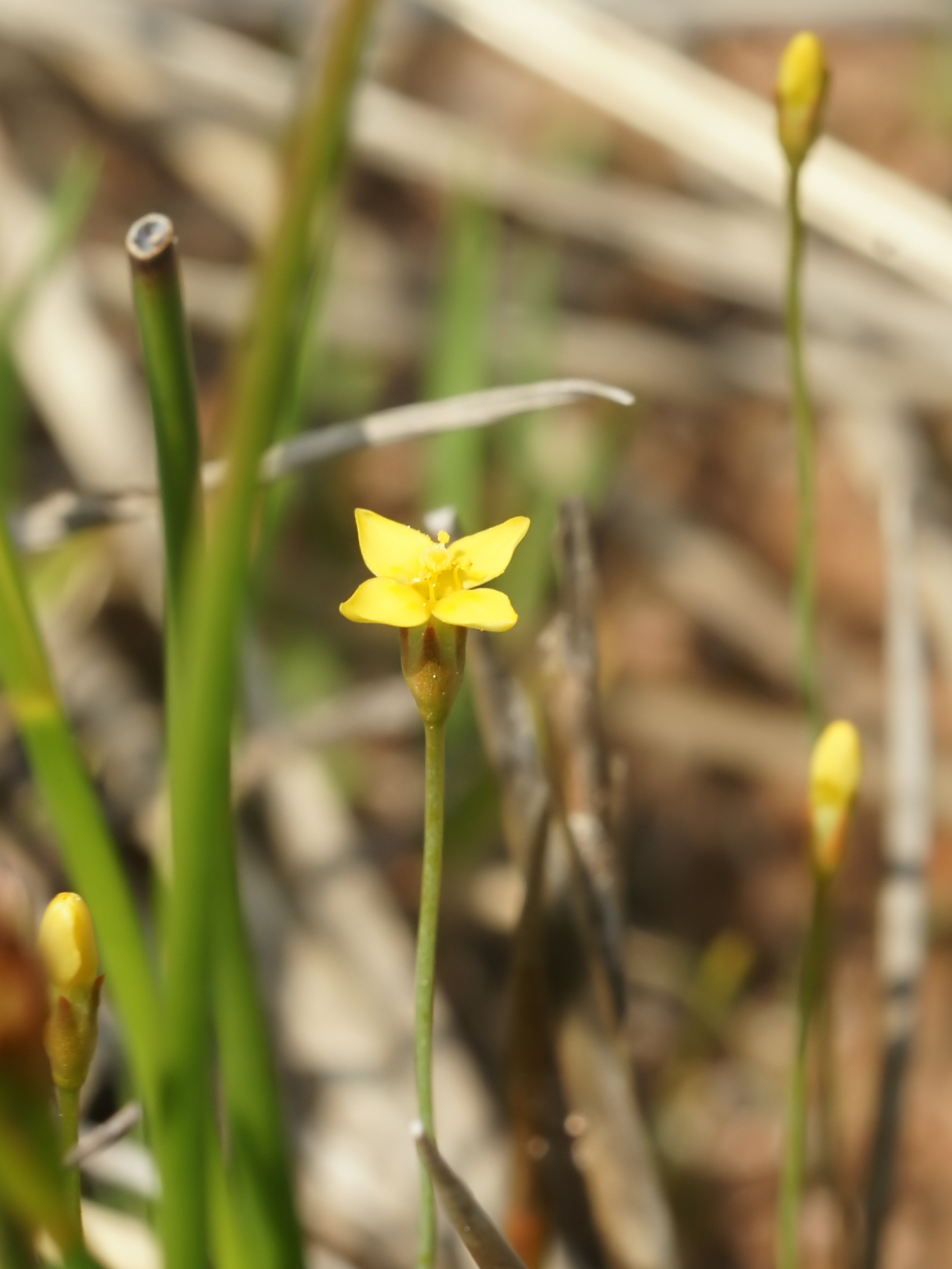
- Cicendia filiformis

Scientific classification
- Kingdom: Plantae
- Clade: Embryophytes
- Clade: Tracheophytes
- Clade: Spermatophytes
- Clade: Angiosperms
- Clade: Eudicots
- Clade: Asterids
- Order: Gentianales
- Family: Gentianaceae
- Tribe: Chironieae
- Subtribe: Chironiinae
- Genus: Cicendia; Adans.

Species
- 2: See text.

= Cicendia =

Genus of plants

Cicendia is a small genus of plants in the gentian family which contains only two species of tiny yellow annual wildflowers. Cicendia filiformis, the slender cicendia or yellow centaury, is native to Europe and naturalized in other places, such as Australia. Cicendia quadrangularis, the Oregon timwort, is native to western North America and South America.

== Species ==
- Cicendia filformis
- Cicendia quadrangularis
