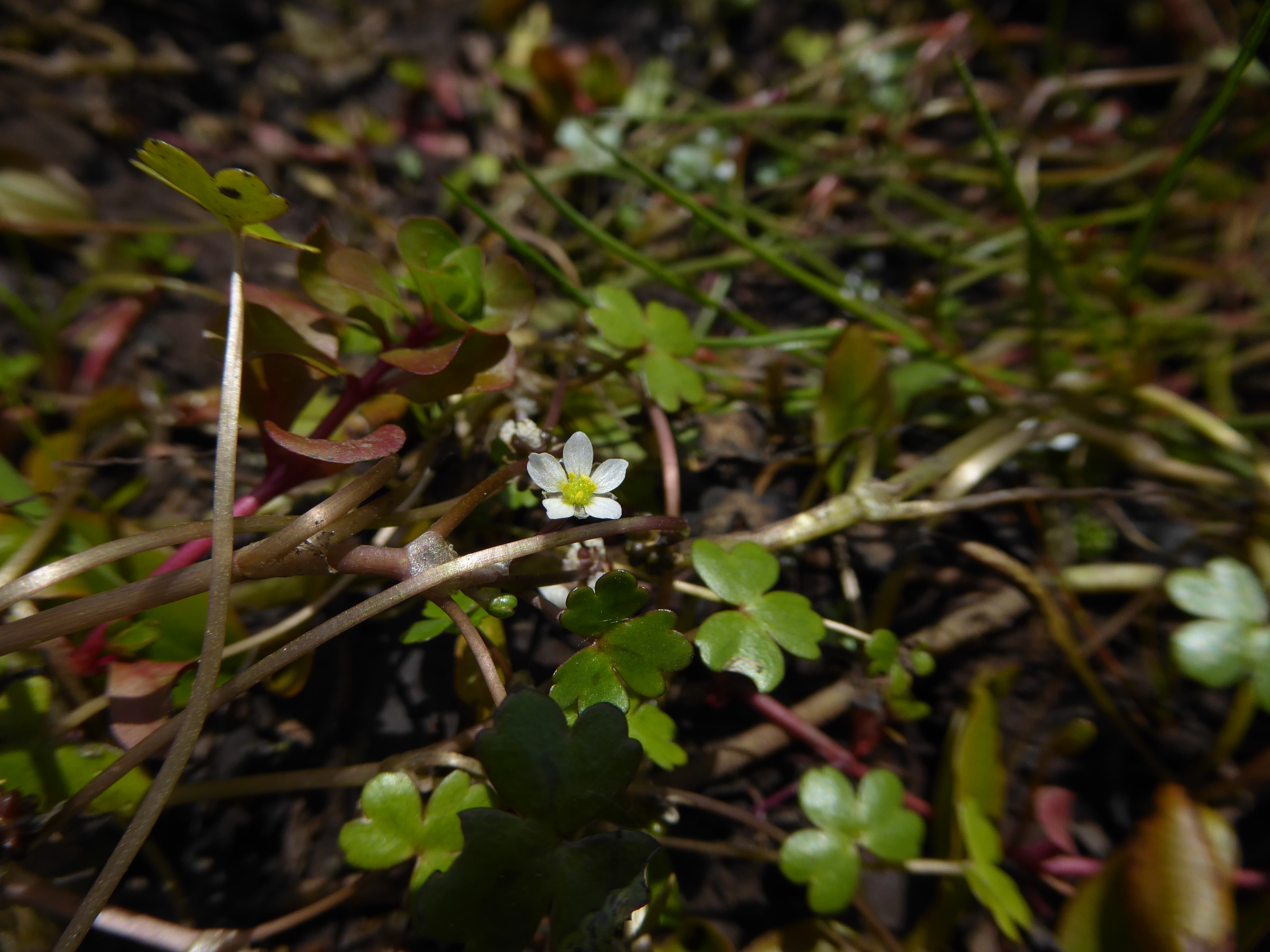

Scientific classification
- Kingdom: Plantae
- Clade: Tracheophytes
- Clade: Angiosperms
- Clade: Eudicots
- Order: Ranunculales
- Family: Ranunculaceae
- Genus: Ranunculus
- Species: R. tripartitus

Binomial name
- Ranunculus tripartitus DC.

= Ranunculus tripartitus =

Species of flowering plant

Ranunculus tripartitus (three-lobed crowfoot) is a species of flowering plant in the family Ranunculaceae, which grows in pools and muddy hollows in coastal parts of Europe, North Africa and West Asia. It is rare and endangered throughout its range, and is considered to be an indicator of favourable environmental conditions.

== Description ==
Ranunculus tripartitus is a procumbent annual to perennial herbaceous plant that grows in shallow water and on exposed mud or peat. Under water it has finely divided, thread-like submerged (capillary) leaves. Floating on the surface, or growing on exposed mud, it has flat, deeply-lobed laminar leaves. Sometimes both leaf shapes are present on the same plant, but intermediate leaves are rare. The laminar leaves are reniform overall, divided more than half-way into three (rarely 5) lobes which are broadest towards the tip, and which are themselves shallowly indented (crenate) at the end. They are 0.5–1.5 cm (0.2–0.6 in) across, with the middle lobe narrower than the side ones. The submerged leaves are 1–4 cm (0.4–1.6 in) long, divided up to 5 times, with sometimes as many as 90 terminal segments. The leaves are opposite or alternate along stems that can be up to 50 cm (20 in) long, with small stipules at the base of the petiole, which can be between 1 and 10 mm long. The stems and leaves are glabrous (hairless).

The actinomorphic flowers are borne singly on long stalks (pedicels) from the leaf axils. Each flower has 5 petals and 5 sepals. The petals are white with a yellow patch towards to base, up to 4.5 mm long, and there is a small space between them. Towards the base of each petal is a small crescent-shaped nectar pit. The sepals are up to 3 mm long, green with a blue tip, and recurved towards the flower stalk. There are 5–8 stamens and numerous (more than 6) carpels. The receptacle is hairy. The fruits are hairless and, as they develop, the pedicel becomes recurved.

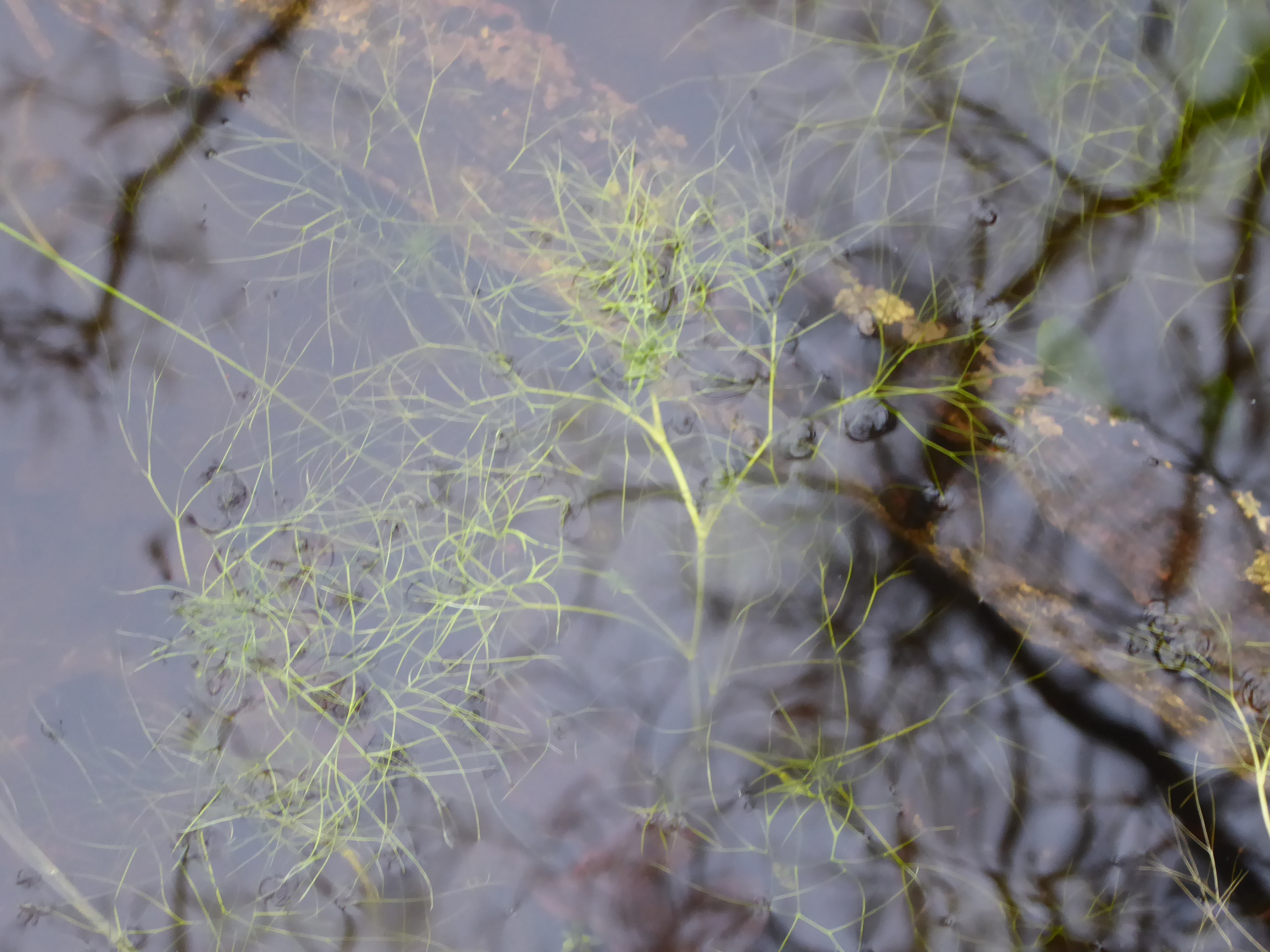
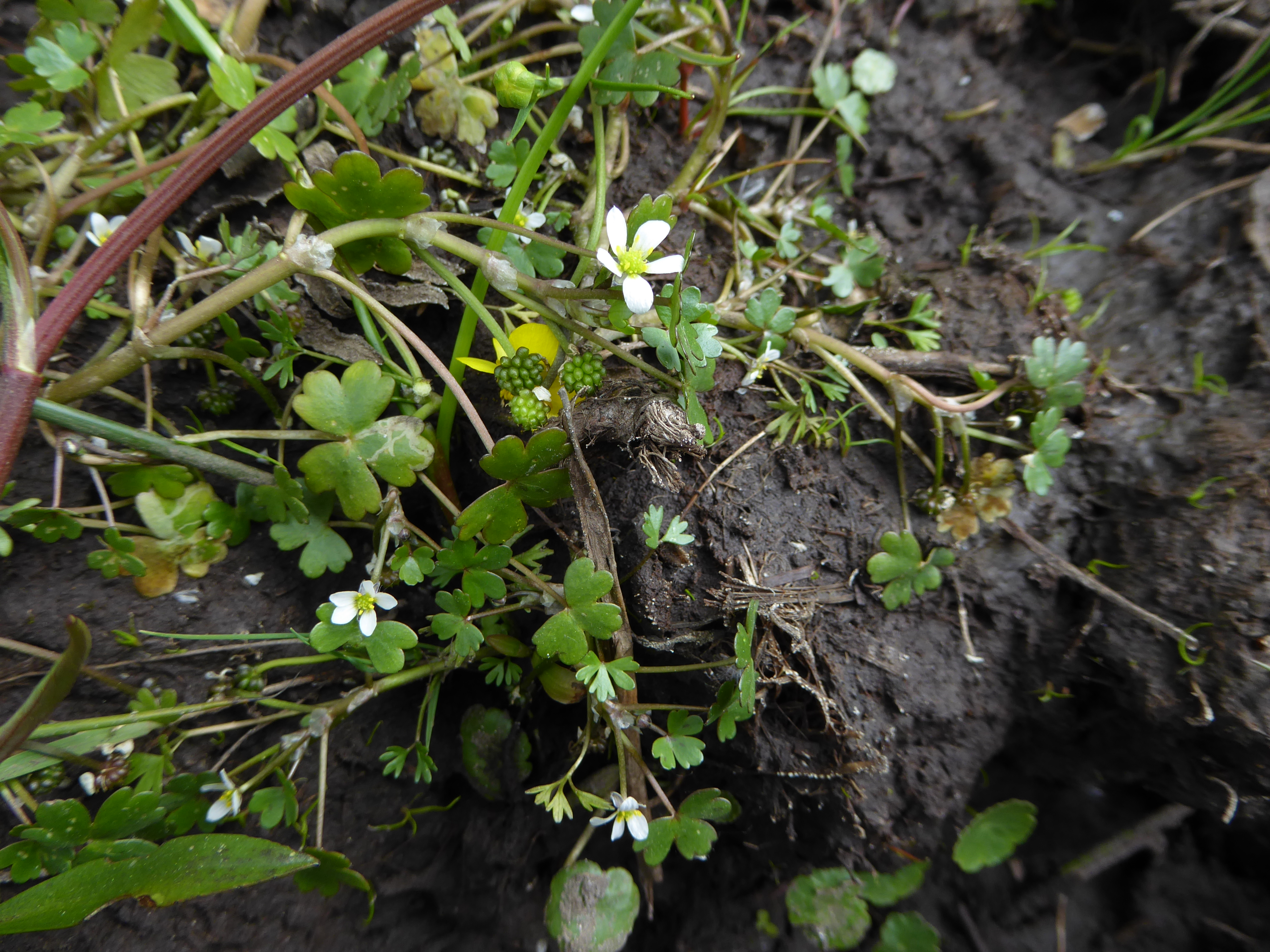
Submerged capillary leaves and terrestrial laminar leaves of three-lobed crowfoot

== Taxonomy ==
Ranunculus tripartitus is included in the taxonomically difficult subgenus (or "section") Batrachium of the buttercup family, which includes all the water-crowfoots. They are aquatic or amphibious species, with white petals, transversely ridged achenes (fruits), and stipules at the base of the leaf stalk. It can be separated from other members of the section by the three-lobed laminar leaves, the petals being about twice as long as the sepals and not contiguous, the reflexed pedicel and the hairy receptacle.

It was described by Augustin Pyramus de Candolle in 1808. The type specimen, which was thought to be in Paris, is missing, so the plate and description in de Candolle's "Icones Plantarum" has been designated a typotype. Ranunculus petiveri W.D.J. Koch, which was later found in Germany, and Batrachium lutarium Revel (France) are considered to be the same species.

There are no subspecies of R. tripartitus, but it does form hybrids with other species in the section, including R. omiophyllus (=R. × novae-forestae S.D. Webster) (which is only known in Britain); common water-crowfoot (also only in Britain); and R. ololeucos (= R. × felixii Segret) (only in France). A key feature for the identification of hybrids is the presence of leaves that are intermediate between the capillary and laminar forms; such plants are also sterile.

The chromosome number of R. tripartitus is 2n = 48.

== Distribution ==
This is primarily a European plant, although it has been reported as far east as Turkey and as far south as Morocco, so it is perhaps present on three continents. Owing to the difficulty of identifying species in the section Batrachium, there is some uncertainty about its range. For example, the Turkish plants were recorded as R. kastamonuensis. It may occur on the Aegean Islands, but this is also unconfirmed. In all parts of its range, R. tripartitus is considered to be rare and possibly endangered.

In Britain, it was first recorded (as R. innominatus) by C.C. Babington in 1848, "near Claremont House, Surrey", an area now known as Esher Commons. It still occurs in this part of the country. The other main populations in Britain are in the heaths of Sussex and Kent, the New Forest, the Lizard peninsula, Pembrokeshire and Anglesey. Because populations fluctuate dramatically, it is difficult to assess its conservation status. In 1962 it was thought to be present in 28 places (10 x 10 km squares) on the map. This had shrunk to 19 by 1987, as low as 10 by 1999, and back up to 27 by 2002. Given a Change Index of -1.09, it narrowly missed being classed as one of the 100 least successful plants in the British Isles.

== Ecology ==
The habitat of R. tripartitus is in shallow pools and muddy hollows in heathland. It requires high levels of moisture and light, and low levels of nutrients. In Britain it is considered an axiophyte wherever it occurs, and it has been described as a useful bioindicator in the Mediterranean region. In the Doñana National Park in Spain, it is found in species-rich ponds of special conservation value. Although it is typically found in coastal areas, it is not tolerant of saline conditions. Its Ellenberg values in Britain are L = 9, F = 10, R = 6, N = 3, and S = 0.

Disturbance, such as trampling and grazing by livestock, is an important factor in its conservation.

It is mainly a lowland plant, recorded only as high as 300 m (980 ft) in Britain, at Belstone in Devon (by William Keble Martin in 1934).
