= Mittelland, Switzerland =

Mittelland District
- District
- Interactive map of Mittelland District
- Country: Switzerland
- Canton: Appenzell Ausserrhoden
- Time zone: UTC+1 (CET)
  - Summer (DST): UTC+2 (CEST)

Mittelland (German pronunciation: [ˈmɪtl̩ˌlant]) is one of districts of the Canton of Appenzell Ausserrhoden, Switzerland.
