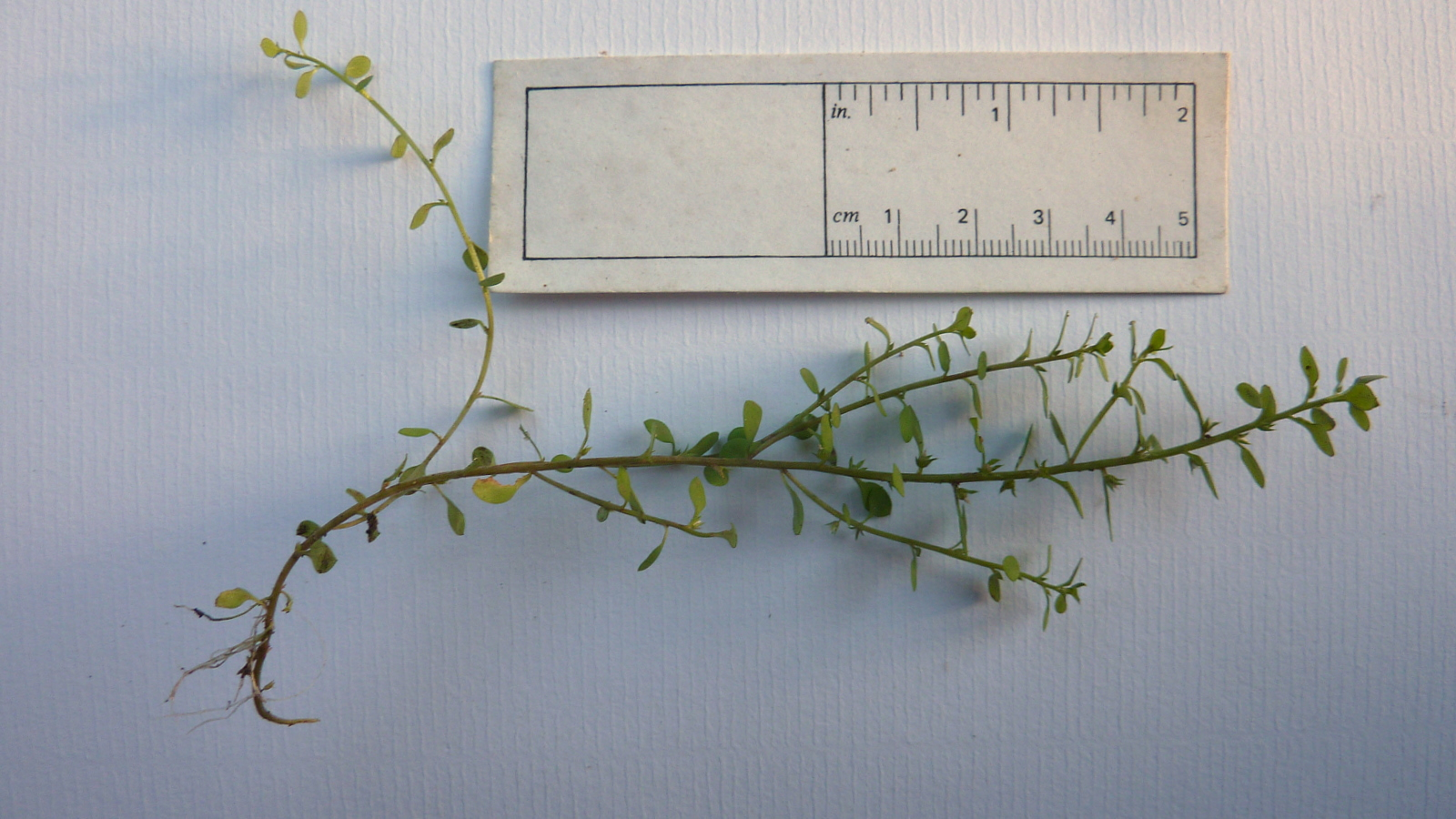

Scientific classification
- Kingdom: Plantae
- Clade: Tracheophytes
- Clade: Angiosperms
- Clade: Eudicots
- Clade: Asterids
- Order: Ericales
- Family: Primulaceae
- Genus: Lysimachia
- Species: L. minima

Binomial name
- Lysimachia minima (L.) U.Manns & Anderb.

Synonyms
- Anagallidastrum exiguum Bubani; Anagallis minima (L.) E.H.L.Krause; Centunculus minimus L.; Micropyxis exigua (Bubani) Lunell

= Lysimachia minima =

Chaffweed

Species of flowering plant

Lysimachia minima (chaffweed) is a 1-4 inch (2–10 cm) perennial herb in the primula family (Primulaceae). A cosmopolitan species, this small plant is native widely across North America and Eurasia. It can be found growing in moist soils and seasonal pools.
