= List of cultural property of national significance in Switzerland: Bern N-Z =

This list contains about half of the cultural property of national significance (class A) in the canton of Bern from the 2009 Swiss Inventory of Cultural Property of National and Regional Significance. It is sorted by municipality and contains 345 individual buildings, 43 collections, 30 archaeological finds and 4 other, special sites or objects.

The geographic coordinates provided are in the Swiss coordinate system as given in the Inventory.

Contents: Top - A through M N O P R S T U V W Z

== Nidau ==
KGS No.^{?}	Picture	Name	Street Address	CH1903 X coordinate	CH1903 Y coordinate	Location
8982	Rathaus (Town council house)	Rathaus (Town council house)	Hauptstrasse 32	584.940	219.426	47.125648°N 7.240163°E
1119	Nidau Castle	Nidau Castle	Hauptstrasse 2–8	584.943	219.663	47.12778°N 7.240195°E
9034	Strandbad Biel (Beach along Lake Biel)	Strandbad Biel (Beach along Lake Biel)	Uferweg 40	584.596	219.893	47.12984°N 7.235614°E
Unknown		ISOS Town / Region: Nidau				

== Niederönz ==
KGS No.^{?}	Picture	Name	Street Address	CH1903 X coordinate	CH1903 Y coordinate	Location
16764	Granary	Granary	Dörflistrasse 4	618.974	226.431	47.188555°N 7.688987°E
16765	Granary	Granary	Dörflistrasse 9a	618.977	226.310	47.187467°N 7.689022°E

== Nods ==
KGS No.^{?}	Picture	Name	Street Address	CH1903 X coordinate	CH1903 Y coordinate	Location
Unknown		ISOS village: Nods				

== Oberbalm ==
KGS No.^{?}	Picture	Name	Street Address	CH1903 X coordinate	CH1903 Y coordinate	Location
9231	Farm House	Farm House	Stöckli 203	597.453	189.700	46.858425°N 7.405237°E
9210	Granary	Granary	Horbermatt 114	598.883	191.515	46.874755°N 7.423985°E
9232	Granary	Granary	Oberbalmstrasse 209 A	597.156	191.378	46.873518°N 7.401332°E

== Oberbipp ==
KGS No.^{?}	Picture	Name	Street Address	CH1903 X coordinate	CH1903 Y coordinate	Location
Unknown		ISOS Village: Oberbipp				

== Oberburg ==
KGS No.^{?}	Picture	Name	Street Address	CH1903 X coordinate	CH1903 Y coordinate	Location
9769	Staldenhof	Staldenhof	Untere Oschwandstrasse 38	614.170	208.653	47.028765°N 7.625045°E
Unknown		ISOS hamlet: Brittenwald				
Unknown		ISOS hamlet: Rohrmoos				

== Oberdiessbach ==
KGS No.^{?}	Picture	Name	Street Address	CH1903 X coordinate	CH1903 Y coordinate	Location
1137	Chapel of the Von Wattenwyl Family	Chapel of the Von Wattenwyl Family	Burgdorfstrasse 6	613.780	187.690	46.840207°N 7.61928°E
1136	Country Estate Diessenhof	Country Estate Diessenhof	Lindenstrasse 20–24	614.001	187.138	46.835237°N 7.62216°E
9502	Oberdiessbach Castle	Oberdiessbach Castle	Schlossstrasse 50	614.299	187.549	46.838927°N 7.626079°E
9764	Statthalterhof	Statthalterhof	Oberbleiken 402, Bleiken bei Oberdiessbach	615.771	185.140	46.817224°N 7.645292°E
Unknown		ISOS Urbanized Village: Oberdiessbach				

== Oberhofen ==
KGS No.^{?}	Picture	Name	Street Address	CH1903 X coordinate	CH1903 Y coordinate	Location
1138	Oberhofen Castle	Oberhofen Castle	Schloss 1–11	617.568	175.413	46.729681°N 7.668465°E
1142	Wichterheer-Gut	Wichterheer-Gut	Staatsstrasse 16–20	617.821	175.280	46.728478°N 7.67177°E
Unknown		ISOS Urbanized Village: Oberhofen am Thunersee				

== Oberried ==
KGS No.^{?}	Picture	Name	Street Address	CH1903 X coordinate	CH1903 Y coordinate	Location
9235	Farm House	Farm House	Platzli 83	639.941	176.332	46.736983°N 7.961227°E

== Oberwil bei Büren ==
KGS No.^{?}	Picture	Name	Street Address	CH1903 X coordinate	CH1903 Y coordinate	Location
Unknown		ISOS Village: Oberwil bei Büren				

== Oberwil im Simmental ==
KGS No.^{?}	Picture	Name	Street Address	CH1903 X coordinate	CH1903 Y coordinate	Location
9236	Venner House	Venner House	Büel 201	601.099	167.694	46.660475°N 7.452996°E
Unknown		ISOS Village: Oberwil im Simmental				
Unknown		ISOS hamlet: Pfaffenried				

== Ochlenberg ==
KGS No.^{?}	Picture	Name	Street Address	CH1903 X coordinate	CH1903 Y coordinate	Location
Unknown		ISOS hamlet: Ochlenberg				
Unknown		ISOS hamlet: Wäckerschwend				

== Orpund ==
KGS No.^{?}	Picture	Name	Street Address	CH1903 X coordinate	CH1903 Y coordinate	Location
Unknown	ISOS Spezialfall: Gottstatt	ISOS Spezialfall: Gottstatt				

== Orvin ==
KGS No.^{?}	Picture	Name	Street Address	CH1903 X coordinate	CH1903 Y coordinate	Location
Unknown		ISOS village: Orvin				
Unknown	ISOS Spezialfall: Taubenlochschlucht	ISOS Spezialfall: Taubenlochschlucht				

== Péry-La Heutte ==
KGS No.^{?}	Picture	Name	Street Address	CH1903 X coordinate	CH1903 Y coordinate	Location
9571	Le Van, Medieval Glass Factory	Le Van, Medieval Glass Factory	La Heutte	583.180	227.480	47.198049°N 7.216668°E
Unknown	ISOS Spezialfall: Taubenlochschlucht	ISOS Spezialfall: Taubenlochschlucht				

== Petit-Val ==
KGS No.^{?}	Picture	Name	Street Address	CH1903 X coordinate	CH1903 Y coordinate	Location
9576	Forêts Du Beucle, medieval iron mine	Forêts Du Beucle, medieval iron mine	Monible	582.050	235.450	47.269706°N 7.201438°E
1233	Reformed Church	Reformed Church	Village 8, Sornetan	583.000	235.930	47.274049°N 7.213974°E
Unknown		ISOS village: Souboz				
Unknown		ISOS village: Châtelat				

== Pieterlen ==
KGS No.^{?}	Picture	Name	Street Address	CH1903 X coordinate	CH1903 Y coordinate	Location
Unknown		Totenweg / Bünden / Kirche (Medieval Graveyard and Church)				

== Plateau de Diesse ==
KGS No.^{?}	Picture	Name	Street Address	CH1903 X coordinate	CH1903 Y coordinate	Location
Unknown		ISOS village: Diesse				

== Pohlern ==
KGS No.^{?}	Picture	Name	Street Address	CH1903 X coordinate	CH1903 Y coordinate	Location
1160	Farm House	Farm House	Rohrmoos, Rohrmooshof 3	607.950	174.253	46.71943°N 7.542621°E
9772	Farm House Mättli	Farm House Mättli	Mettli 23	607.632	174.782	46.724193°N 7.53847°E

== Rapperswil ==
KGS No.^{?}	Picture	Name	Street Address	CH1903 X coordinate	CH1903 Y coordinate	Location
Unknown		ISOS Village: Seewil				
Unknown		ISOS hamlet: Moosaffoltern				
Unknown		ISOS hamlet: Zimlisberg				
Unknown		ISOS Village: Bangerten				

== Reconvilier ==
KGS No.^{?}	Picture	Name	Street Address	CH1903 X coordinate	CH1903 Y coordinate	Location
Unknown		ISOS village urbanisé: Reconvilier				

== Reichenbach im Kandertal ==
KGS No.^{?}	Picture	Name	Street Address	CH1903 X coordinate	CH1903 Y coordinate	Location
1165	Gasthof Bären	Gasthof Bären	Dorfstrasse	619.585	163.849	46.625601°N 7.694359°E
10424	Letzi Mülenen Medieval Fortified Wall	Letzi Mülenen; Medieval Fortified Wall	Talsperre	619.400	165.200	46.63776°N 7.692°E
9233	Notar-Sieber-House	Notar-Sieber-House	Dorfstrasse	619.548	163.799	46.625153°N 7.693874°E

== Renan ==
KGS No.^{?}	Picture	Name	Street Address	CH1903 X coordinate	CH1903 Y coordinate	Location
Unknown		ISOS village: Renan (BE)				

== Riggisberg ==
KGS No.^{?}	Picture	Name	Street Address	CH1903 X coordinate	CH1903 Y coordinate	Location
8547	Abegg-Stiftung	Abegg-Stiftung	Werner Abegg-Strasse 67	604.267	184.920	46.815418°N 7.494548°E
1196	Speicherstöckli	Speicherstöckli	Rüti bei Riggisberg, Grand Nr. 15 (111 A)	603.431	180.477	46.775457°N 7.48356°E
1192	Rümligen Castle	Rümligen Castle	Schloss 26	603.909	186.461	46.829282°N 7.48987°E

== Ringgenberg ==
KGS No.^{?}	Picture	Name	Street Address	CH1903 X coordinate	CH1903 Y coordinate	Location
1175	Church and Ruins of Ringgenberg Castle	Church and Ruins of Ringgenberg Castle	Bir Chilchen 60	635.060	172.300	46.700988°N 7.897057°E
Unknown		ISOS Village: Ringgenberg				

== Rohrbach ==
KGS No.^{?}	Picture	Name	Street Address	CH1903 X coordinate	CH1903 Y coordinate	Location
Unknown		ISOS Village: Rohrbach				

== Röthenbach im Emmental ==
KGS No.^{?}	Picture	Name	Street Address	CH1903 X coordinate	CH1903 Y coordinate	Location
9237		Alp Gabelspitz	Schallenberg-Gabelspitz 150	626.695	186.569	46.82973°N 7.788516°E
1178	Church of Würzbrunnen	Church of Würzbrunnen	Würzbrunnen 295	622.755	190.305	46.863483°N 7.737063°E

== Rubigen ==
KGS No.^{?}	Picture	Name	Street Address	CH1903 X coordinate	CH1903 Y coordinate	Location
Unknown		ISOS hamlet: Kleinhöchstetten				

== Rüderswil ==
KGS No.^{?}	Picture	Name	Street Address	CH1903 X coordinate	CH1903 Y coordinate	Location
Unknown		ISOS Village: Rüderswil				
Unknown		ISOS Village: Ranflüh (Lützelflüh, Rüderswil)				
Unknown		ISOS hamlet: Ried				

== Rüeggisberg ==
KGS No.^{?}	Picture	Name	Street Address	CH1903 X coordinate	CH1903 Y coordinate	Location
9775	Rossgrabenbrücke (Bridge, Shared with Wahlern)	Rossgrabenbrücke (Bridge, Shared with Wahlern)		596.920	186.295	46.827794°N 7.398271°E
1186	Ruins of the former Cluniac Rüeggisberg Priory Church	Ruins of the former Cluniac Rüeggisberg Priory Church	Monastery 1	599.878	185.357	46.819363°N 7.437039°E
1185	Schwandbachbrücke (Bridge)	Schwandbachbrücke (Bridge)	Schwandbach	597.236	186.466	46.829333°N 7.402411°E
Unknown		ISOS Dorf				
Unknown		ISOS hamlet: Oberbütschel				
Unknown		ISOS hamlet: Schwanden				

== Rüegsau ==
KGS No.^{?}	Picture	Name	Street Address	CH1903 X coordinate	CH1903 Y coordinate	Location
10492	Holzbrücke (Wooden Bridge)	Holzbrücke (Wooden Bridge)	Winterseistrasse / Brückenstrasse (Shared With Hasle bei Burgdorf)	615.980	207.785	47.020916°N 7.648825°E

== Rumendingen ==
KGS No.^{?}	Picture	Name	Street Address	CH1903 X coordinate	CH1903 Y coordinate	Location
Unknown		ISOS Village: Rumendingen				

== Rüti bei Büren ==
KGS No.^{?}	Picture	Name	Street Address	CH1903 X coordinate	CH1903 Y coordinate	Location
Unknown		ISOS Village: Rüti bei Büren				

== Saanen ==
KGS No.^{?}	Picture	Name	Street Address	CH1903 X coordinate	CH1903 Y coordinate	Location
1198	Alte Kastlanei	Alte Kastlanei	Davidsmatte 231	586.929	148.698	46.489469°N 7.268398°E
1200	Church	Church	Pfruendmatte 74	586.165	148.790	46.490281°N 7.258445°E
Unknown	ISOS Village: Saanen	ISOS Village: Saanen				

== Saicourt ==
KGS No.^{?}	Picture	Name	Street Address	CH1903 X coordinate	CH1903 Y coordinate	Location
1203	Former Premonstratensian Abbey	Former Premonstratensian Abbey	Belellay 163	579.563	234.834	47.264094°N 7.168602°E
Unknown		ISOS cas particulier: Bellelay				

== Saint-Imier ==
KGS No.^{?}	Picture	Name	Street Address	CH1903 X coordinate	CH1903 Y coordinate	Location
1245	Collégiale	Collégiale	Place Du Marché 10	566.478	222.495	47.152575°N 6.996631°E
9282	Longines watchmaking factory	Longines watchmaking factory	Les Longines 8	566.998	222.127	47.149291°N 7.003514°E
Unknown		ISOS village urbanisé: Saint-Imier				

== Sauge ==
KGS No.^{?}	Picture	Name	Street Address	CH1903 X coordinate	CH1903 Y coordinate	Location
Unknown	ISOS Spezialfall: Taubenlochschlucht (Biel/Bienne, Orvin, Péry, Sauge)	ISOS Spezialfall: Taubenlochschlucht (Biel/Bienne, Orvin, Péry, Sauge)				

== Schangnau ==
KGS No.^{?}	Picture	Name	Street Address	CH1903 X coordinate	CH1903 Y coordinate	Location
9238	Krämer House	Krämer House	Dorf 39	632.196	186.336	46.827391°N 7.860597°E

== Schüpfen ==
KGS No.^{?}	Picture	Name	Street Address	CH1903 X coordinate	CH1903 Y coordinate	Location
Unknown		ISOS Village: Schwanden				
Unknown		ISOS hamlet: Winterswil				

== Schwarzenburg ==
KGS No.^{?}	Picture	Name	Street Address	CH1903 X coordinate	CH1903 Y coordinate	Location
1327	Bauernhof Aeckenmatt	Bauernhof Aeckenmatt	Aeckenmatt 6	594.270	189.650	46.857955°N 7.363498°E
1317	Castle Ruin Grasburg	Castle Ruin Grasburg		591.850	186.970	46.833823°N 7.331811°E
1319	Frühmess Chapel	Frühmess Chapel	Käppeligässli 5	592.620	185.100	46.81701°N 7.341934°E
1318		Rossgrabenbrücke (Bridge, shared with Rüeggisberg)		596.920	186.295	46.827794°N 7.398271°E
1320	Schwarzenburg Castle	Schwarzenburg Castle	Schlossgasse 13	592.579	184.882	46.815049°N 7.341401°E
9230	Granary	Granary	Henzischwand 298 A	595.786	184.288	46.809734°N 7.383427°E
Unknown		ISOS Town / Region: Schwarzenburg				
Unknown		ISOS hamlet: Aeckenmatt				
Unknown		ISOS hamlet: Elisried				

== Seeberg ==
KGS No.^{?}	Picture	Name	Street Address	CH1903 X coordinate	CH1903 Y coordinate	Location
Unknown		ISOS Village: Riedtwil				

== Signau ==
KGS No.^{?}	Picture	Name	Street Address	CH1903 X coordinate	CH1903 Y coordinate	Location
Unknown		ISOS Village: Signau				

== Sigriswil ==
KGS No.^{?}	Picture	Name	Street Address	CH1903 X coordinate	CH1903 Y coordinate	Location
Unknown		ISOS hamlet: Wiler				

== Siselen ==
KGS No.^{?}	Picture	Name	Street Address	CH1903 X coordinate	CH1903 Y coordinate	Location
1229	Rectory	Rectory	Juchen 5	581.023	208.969	47.031487°N 7.18898°E
Unknown		ISOS Village: Siselen				

== Sonvilier ==
KGS No.^{?}	Picture	Name	Street Address	CH1903 X coordinate	CH1903 Y coordinate	Location
1230		Ferme De La Grande Coronelle	La Coronelle 94	562.541	223.600	47.162303°N 6.944629°E

== Spiez ==
KGS No.^{?}	Picture	Name	Street Address	CH1903 X coordinate	CH1903 Y coordinate	Location
9578		Bürg (Prehistoric / Medieval Hilltop Settlement)		619.630	170.000	46.680931°N 7.695209°E
1236	Swiss Reformed Castle Church	Swiss Reformed Castle Church	Schlossstrasse 17	619.110	170.899	46.689033°N 7.68845°E
1237	Spiez Castle	Spiez Castle	Schlossstrasse 16	619.028	170.912	46.689153°N 7.687378°E
9239	Weinbauernhof	Weinbauernhof	Spiezbergstrasse 46	618.770	171.095	46.690806°N 7.684013°E

== Steffisburg ==
KGS No.^{?}	Picture	Name	Street Address	CH1903 X coordinate	CH1903 Y coordinate	Location
9089		Former Regie of Steffisburg	Schwäbis 103	613.560	179.092	46.762869°N 7.616141°E

== Studen ==
KGS No.^{?}	Picture	Name	Street Address	CH1903 X coordinate	CH1903 Y coordinate	Location
1247	Petinesca Roman era Vicus / Temple Complex	Petinesca; Roman era Vicus / Temple Complex		589.150	217.700	47.110205°N 7.295688°E

== Sumiswald ==
KGS No.^{?}	Picture	Name	Street Address	CH1903 X coordinate	CH1903 Y coordinate	Location
9240	Gasthof Bären	Gasthof Bären	Marktgasse 1	623.353	208.548	47.02756°N 7.745842°E
9241	Rectory	Rectory	Pfarrgässli 2	623.363	208.590	47.027938°N 7.745975°E
1250	Swiss Reformed Church	Swiss Reformed Church	Kirchgasse 4	623.290	208.570	47.027761°N 7.745014°E
Unknown		ISOS Village: Sumiswald				

== Sutz-Lattrigen ==
KGS No.^{?}	Picture	Name	Street Address	CH1903 X coordinate	CH1903 Y coordinate	Location
9579		Neolithic / Bronze Age Lake-Side Settlement		583.000	217.200	47.105578°N 7.21468°E
9127	Von Rütte-Gut	Von Rütte-Gut	Seestrasse 6	582.945	216.877	47.102671°N 7.213968°E

== Tavannes ==
KGS No.^{?}	Picture	Name	Street Address	CH1903 X coordinate	CH1903 Y coordinate	Location
9765	Eglise Du Christ-Roi	Eglise Du Christ-Roi	Rue Du Général Voirol 7	581.730	230.099	47.221568°N 7.197427°E
9580	Pierre Pertuis (passage carved into the rock above the Roman road)	Pierre Pertuis (passage carved into the rock above the Roman road)	passage taillé dans le rocher	581.480	229.150	47.213025°N 7.194166°E
Unknown		ISOS village urbanisé: Tavannes				

== Thun ==
KGS No.^{?}	Picture	Name	Street Address	CH1903 X coordinate	CH1903 Y coordinate	Location
1260	Dampfschiff Blüemlisalp (Steamship Blüemlisalp)	Dampfschiff Blüemlisalp (Steamship Blüemlisalp)		614.745	178.125	46.754145°N 7.631621°E
1269	Former Hotel Bellevue-Du Parc	Former Hotel Bellevue-Du Parc	Göttibachweg 2	614.801	178.511	46.757616°N 7.632367°E
1272	Former Hotel Thunerhof	Former Hotel Thunerhof	Hofstettenstrasse 14	614.927	178.324	46.755931°N 7.63401°E
1261	zum Rosengarten House	zum Rosengarten House	Freienhofgasse 20	614.666	178.478	46.757322°N 7.630599°E
1271	Landsitz Bellerive	Landsitz Bellerive	Gwattstrasse 120	614.227	174.968	46.725758°N 7.624744°E
1273	Mannschaftskaserne (Armory)	Mannschaftskaserne (Armory)	Allmendstrasse 243–248	613.851	178.710	46.759427°N 7.619938°E
9512	Platzschulhaus (Former Hospital)	Platzschulhaus (Former Hospital)	Rathausplatz 3	614.544	178.728	46.759574°N 7.62901°E
1262	Rathaus (Town council house)	Rathaus (Town council house)	Rathausplatz 1	614.486	178.713	46.75944°N 7.62825°E
1263	Reformed Church of Scherzligen	Reformed Church of Scherzligen	Seestrasse 41	615.110	177.370	46.747345°N 7.636374°E
11719		Sammlung Historisches Armeematerial (Collection of Historical Military Equipment) (Shared between Thun, Burgdorf and Dübendorf in Zurich)		613.800	178.500	46.757539°N 7.619265°E
1264	Thun Castle	Thun Castle	Schlossberg 1	614.606	178.784	46.760076°N 7.629823°E
1265	Schadau Castle	Schadau Castle	Seestrasse 45	615.184	177.234	46.74612°N 7.637338°E
8586		Schweizerisches Armeemuseum (Swiss Army Museum)		612.901	178.926	46.761389°N 7.60751°E
10423	City Walls	City Walls		614.680	178.700	46.759319°N 7.630789°E
1276		Vaporama, Museum of Steam Power	Schadau-Kutscherei	615.081	177.186	46.745691°N 7.635988°E
1267	Wocher-Panorama	Wocher-Panorama	Seestrasse 45 F	615.081	177.186	46.745691°N 7.635988°E
Unknown		ISOS Stadt: Thun				

== Thunstetten ==
KGS No.^{?}	Picture	Name	Street Address	CH1903 X coordinate	CH1903 Y coordinate	Location
1277	Thunstetten Castle	Thunstetten Castle	Bergasse 5	623.865	228.322	47.205406°N 7.753621°E

== Toffen ==
KGS No.^{?}	Picture	Name	Street Address	CH1903 X coordinate	CH1903 Y coordinate	Location
1279	Toffen Castle	Toffen Castle	Schlossweg 4	603.843	190.259	46.863447°N 7.489037°E

== Trachselwald ==
KGS No.^{?}	Picture	Name	Street Address	CH1903 X coordinate	CH1903 Y coordinate	Location
1281	Village Church	Village Church	Village 4	622.740	207.320	47.016536°N 7.737716°E
1283	Trachselwald Castle	Trachselwald Castle	Schloss 8	623.056	207.430	47.017514°N 7.741878°E
Unknown		ISOS Village: Trachselwald (Lützelflüh)				

== Tramelan ==
KGS No.^{?}	Picture	Name	Street Address	CH1903 X coordinate	CH1903 Y coordinate	Location
Unknown		ISOS hameau: Le Cernil / La Chaux de Tramelan				

== Trub ==
KGS No.^{?}	Picture	Name	Street Address	CH1903 X coordinate	CH1903 Y coordinate	Location
9767		Farm House	Hinter Hütten 239	633.009	203.129	46.978406°N 7.872468°E
9227	Farm House Ober-Brandösch	Farm House Ober-Brandösch	Brandösch 146	634.713	202.527	46.972905°N 7.894817°E
9228	Farm House	Farm House	Schwithtenhof 11	631.819	197.863	46.931097°N 7.85646°E
Unknown		ISOS Village: Trub				

== Tschugg ==
KGS No.^{?}	Picture	Name	Street Address	CH1903 X coordinate	CH1903 Y coordinate	Location
1291	Former Landgut Steiger	Former Landgut Steiger	Unterdorf 44	572.614	208.457	47.026588°N 7.078386°E

== Twann-Tüscherz ==
KGS No.^{?}	Picture	Name	Street Address	CH1903 X coordinate	CH1903 Y coordinate	Location
1294	Former Clunic Priory	Former Clunic Priory	St. Petersinsel 26	577.517	213.230	47.069705°N 7.142645°E
1297	Former Thormanngut	Former Thormanngut	Wingreis 22	580.024	216.784	47.101753°N 7.175493°E
9229	Fraubrunnen House	Fraubrunnen House	Dorfgasse 28	578.693	216.052	47.095127°N 7.157994°E
Unknown		ISOS Village: Tüscherz				
Unknown		ISOS Village: Twann				
Unknown		ISOS hamlet: Wingreis				

== Unterseen ==
KGS No.^{?}	Picture	Name	Street Address	CH1903 X coordinate	CH1903 Y coordinate	Location
9581	Old City of Unterseen	Old City of Unterseen		631.400	170.700	46.686778°N 7.849093°E
1301	Weissenau Ruins	Weissenau Ruins		630.140	168.840	46.670105°N 7.832501°E
Unknown		ISOS Town / Region: Unterseen				

== Utzenstorf ==
KGS No.^{?}	Picture	Name	Street Address	CH1903 X coordinate	CH1903 Y coordinate	Location
9582		Bürglenhubel, Neolithic Hilltop Settlement		610.900	220.050	47.131342°N 7.582302°E
9774	Gasthof Bären	Gasthof Bären	Hauptstrasse 18	609.010	219.786	47.128996°N 7.557386°E
1307	Landshut Castle	Landshut Castle	Schlossstrasse 15–21	608.343	220.715	47.137361°N 7.548613°E
Unknown		ISOS Spezialfall: Landshut Castle				

== Vechigen ==
KGS No.^{?}	Picture	Name	Street Address	CH1903 X coordinate	CH1903 Y coordinate	Location
Unknown		ISOS hamlet: Lindental				

== Vinelz ==
KGS No.^{?}	Picture	Name	Street Address	CH1903 X coordinate	CH1903 Y coordinate	Location
9583		Ländti, Neolithic / Bronze Age Lakeshore Settlement		575.150	209.660	47.037508°N 7.111679°E
Unknown		ISOS Village: Vinelz				

== Walperswil ==
KGS No.^{?}	Picture	Name	Street Address	CH1903 X coordinate	CH1903 Y coordinate	Location
1330	Rectory	Rectory	Kirchweg	583.976	212.050	47.059279°N 7.22772°E
Unknown		ISOS Village: Walperswil				

== Wangen an der Aare ==
KGS No.^{?}	Picture	Name	Street Address	CH1903 X coordinate	CH1903 Y coordinate	Location
9251	Former Watch Tower, now Rectory	Former Watch Tower, now Rectory	Städtli 40	616.292	231.703	47.236047°N 7.653791°E
1333	Wooden Bridge	Wooden Bridge	Aarebrücke	616.400	231.830	47.237186°N 7.655222°E
1337	Castle	Castle	Städtli 26	616.346	231.714	47.236144°N 7.654504°E
Unknown		ISOS Town / Region: Wangen an der Aare				

== Wiedlisbach ==
KGS No.^{?}	Picture	Name	Street Address	CH1903 X coordinate	CH1903 Y coordinate	Location
Unknown		ISOS Town / Region: Wiedlisbach				

== Wiggiswil ==
KGS No.^{?}	Picture	Name	Street Address	CH1903 X coordinate	CH1903 Y coordinate	Location
Unknown	ISOS hamlet: Wiggiswil	ISOS hamlet: Wiggiswil				

== Wilderswil ==
KGS No.^{?}	Picture	Name	Street Address	CH1903 X coordinate	CH1903 Y coordinate	Location
Unknown		ISOS Urbanized Village: Wilderswil				
Unknown		ISOS Village: Gsteig bei Interlaken (with Gsteigwiler)				

== Wileroltigen ==
KGS No.^{?}	Picture	Name	Street Address	CH1903 X coordinate	CH1903 Y coordinate	Location
Unknown		ISOS Village: Wileroltigen				

== Willadingen ==
KGS No.^{?}	Picture	Name	Street Address	CH1903 X coordinate	CH1903 Y coordinate	Location
Unknown		ISOS Village: Willadingen				

== Wimmis ==
KGS No.^{?}	Picture	Name	Street Address	CH1903 X coordinate	CH1903 Y coordinate	Location
1347	Village Church	Village Church	Schlossgasse 2 A	615.064	169.100	46.672954°N 7.6355°E
10474	Letzi Spissi	Letzi Spissi	Talsperre	614.590	168.480	46.667387°N 7.629286°E
9925	Wimmis Castle	Wimmis Castle	Schlossgasse 6	614.981	169.051	46.672515°N 7.634414°E
Unknown		ISOS Village: Wimmis				

== Wohlen bei Bern ==
KGS No.^{?}	Picture	Name	Street Address	CH1903 X coordinate	CH1903 Y coordinate	Location
1348	Hofenmühle	Hofenmühle	Mühlegasse 21	593.325	201.915	46.968273°N 7.350926°E
Unknown		ISOS hamlet: Hofen				
Unknown		ISOS hamlet: Illiswil				
Unknown		ISOS hamlet: Möriswil				
Unknown		ISOS hamlet: Oberdettigen				

== Worb ==
KGS No.^{?}	Picture	Name	Street Address	CH1903 X coordinate	CH1903 Y coordinate	Location
1352	Worb Castle or Altes Schloss	Worb Castle or Altes Schloss	Schloss 2–6	609.819	197.816	46.931363°N 7.567573°E
1354	Swiss Reformed Church	Swiss Reformed Church	Enggisteinstrasse 6	609.575	197.680	46.930143°N 7.564366°E
Unknown		ISOS hamlet: Wattenwil				

== Wynau ==
KGS No.^{?}	Picture	Name	Street Address	CH1903 X coordinate	CH1903 Y coordinate	Location
9782	Rectory	Rectory	Kirchweg 12	627.994	234.657	47.262224°N 7.808511°E
1356	Swiss Reformed Church	Swiss Reformed Church	Kirchweg 10	627.984	234.656	47.262216°N 7.808378°E
9252	Speicherstöckli	Speicherstöckli	Aarwangenstrasse 5	627.994	234.514	47.260938°N 7.808502°E

== Wynigen ==
KGS No.^{?}	Picture	Name	Street Address	CH1903 X coordinate	CH1903 Y coordinate	Location
9253	Farm House	Farm House	Oberbühl 239	619.763	217.166	47.105196°N 7.698992°E
9768	Farm House Glungge	Farm House Glungge	Brechershäusern 340	618.829	218.754	47.119507°N 7.686754°E
9254	Dorfbrunnen (Fountain)	Dorfbrunnen (Fountain)	Dorfstrasse	617.382	217.248	47.106°N 7.667629°E
1358	Former Gasthof Wilder Mann	Former Gasthof Wilder Mann	Dorfstrasse 12	617.288	217.225	47.105796°N 7.666389°E
1360	Rectory	Rectory	Dorfstrasse 8	617.310	217.255	47.106065°N 7.66668°E
9255	Granary in Oberbüel	Granary in Oberbüel	Oberbüel 239 C	619.747	217.158	47.105124°N 7.698781°E
Unknown		ISOS hamlet: Breitenegg				

== Zollikofen ==
KGS No.^{?}	Picture	Name	Street Address	CH1903 X coordinate	CH1903 Y coordinate	Location
9167	Archiv Schweizer Milchproduzenten (Archive of Swiss Milk Production)	Archiv Schweizer Milchproduzenten (Archive of Swiss Milk Production)	Molkereistrasse 23	601.634	204.699	46.993347°N 7.460118°E
1364	Reichenbach Castle	Reichenbach Castle	Schloss Reichenbach 6–11	600.826	204.411	46.990758°N 7.449496°E
Unknown		ISOS hamlet: Büelikofen / Graben				

== Zweisimmen ==
KGS No.^{?}	Picture	Name	Street Address	CH1903 X coordinate	CH1903 Y coordinate	Location
1367	Swiss Reformed Church and Rectory	Swiss Reformed Church and Rectory	Kirchgasse 231	595.650	157.820	46.57164°N 7.381896°E
1369	Ruins of Oberer Mannenberg Castle	Ruins of Oberer Mannenberg Castle	Manneberg Riedli	595.480	157.680	46.570379°N 7.37968°E
11720	Ruins of Unterer Mannenberg Castle	Ruins of Unterer Mannenberg Castle		594.874	155.626	46.551898°N 7.371798°E
