= Lists of cultural property of national significance in Switzerland =

List of cultural property of national significance in Switzerland includes:

- List of cultural property of national significance in Switzerland: Aargau
- List of cultural property of national significance in Switzerland: Appenzell Ausserrhoden
- List of cultural property of national significance in Switzerland: Appenzell Innerrhoden
- List of cultural property of national significance in Switzerland: Basel-Landschaft
- List of cultural property of national significance in Switzerland: Basel-Stadt
- List of cultural property of national significance in Switzerland: Bern
  - List of cultural property of national significance in Switzerland: Bern A-M
  - List of cultural property of national significance in Switzerland: Bern N-Z
- List of cultural property of national significance in Switzerland: Fribourg
- List of cultural property of national significance in Switzerland: Geneva
- List of cultural property of national significance in Switzerland: Glarus
- List of cultural property of national significance in Switzerland: Graubünden
- List of cultural property of national significance in Switzerland: Jura
- List of cultural property of national significance in Switzerland: Lucerne
- List of cultural property of national significance in Switzerland: Neuchâtel
- List of cultural property of national significance in Switzerland: Nidwalden
- List of cultural property of national significance in Switzerland: Obwalden
- List of cultural property of national significance in Switzerland: Schaffhausen
- List of cultural property of national significance in Switzerland: Schwyz
- List of cultural property of national significance in Switzerland: Solothurn
- List of cultural property of national significance in Switzerland: St. Gallen
- List of cultural property of national significance in Switzerland: Thurgau
- List of cultural property of national significance in Switzerland: Ticino
- List of cultural property of national significance in Switzerland: Uri
- List of cultural property of national significance in Switzerland: Valais
- List of cultural property of national significance in Switzerland: Vaud
- List of cultural property of national significance in Switzerland: Zug
- List of cultural property of national significance in Switzerland: Zurich
