= List of cultural property of national significance in Switzerland: Bern =

List of the Swiss Inventory of Cultural Property of National and Regional Significance in the Canton of Bern, including in the city of Bern.

The cultural property 2009 class A listings are sorted by municipality and contains 345 individual buildings, 43 collections, 30 archaeological sites, and 4 other special sites or objects.

== Lists ==
Due to the number of cultural properties of national significance in the canton of Bern, and the city of Bern, the listings have been divided alphabetically into 2 lists.

1. List of cultural property of national significance in Switzerland: Bern A-M
2. List of cultural property of national significance in Switzerland: Bern N-Z

== See also ==
- Cultural properties of national significance in the Canton of Bern topics
- History of Bern
