= Wangen an der Aare Castle =

Castle in Wangen an der Aare, Switzerland

Coordinates: 47°14′10″N 7°39′17″E

Wangen an der Aare Castle is a castle in the municipality of Wangen an der Aare of the Canton of Bern in Switzerland. It is a Swiss heritage site of national significance.

== Gallery ==
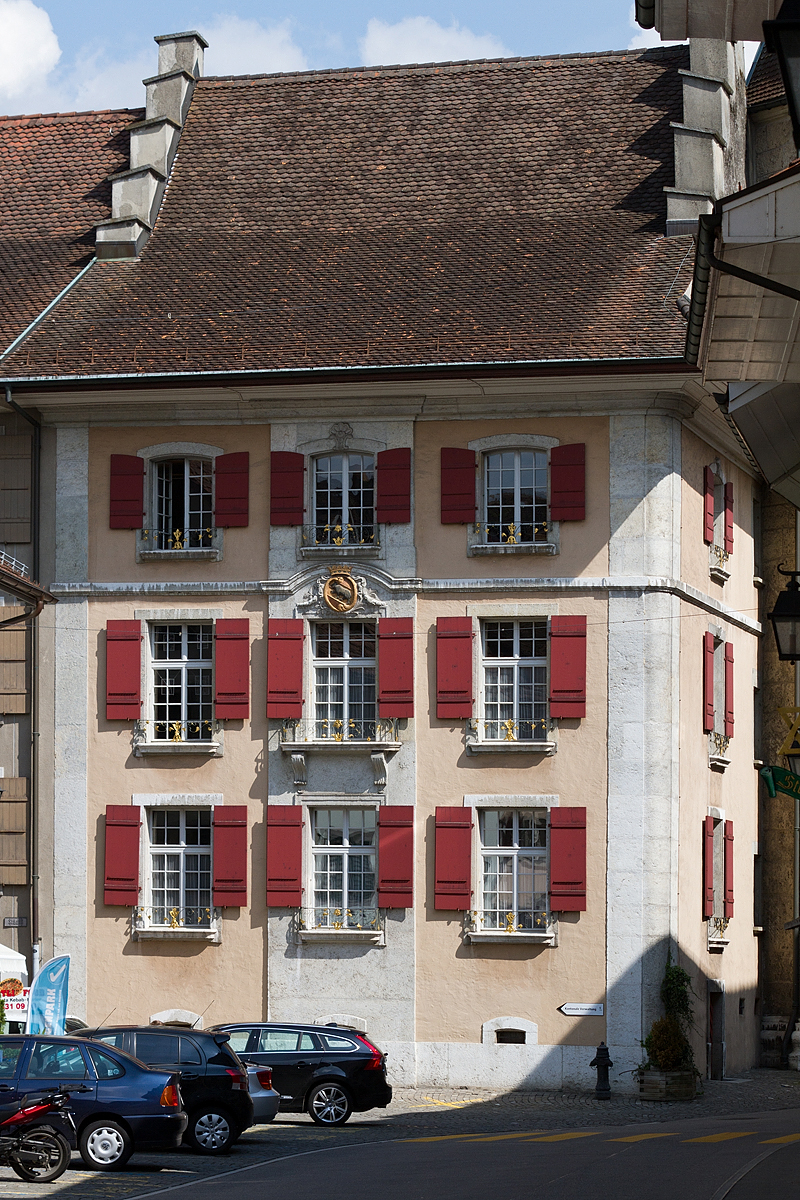
Castle from the town side

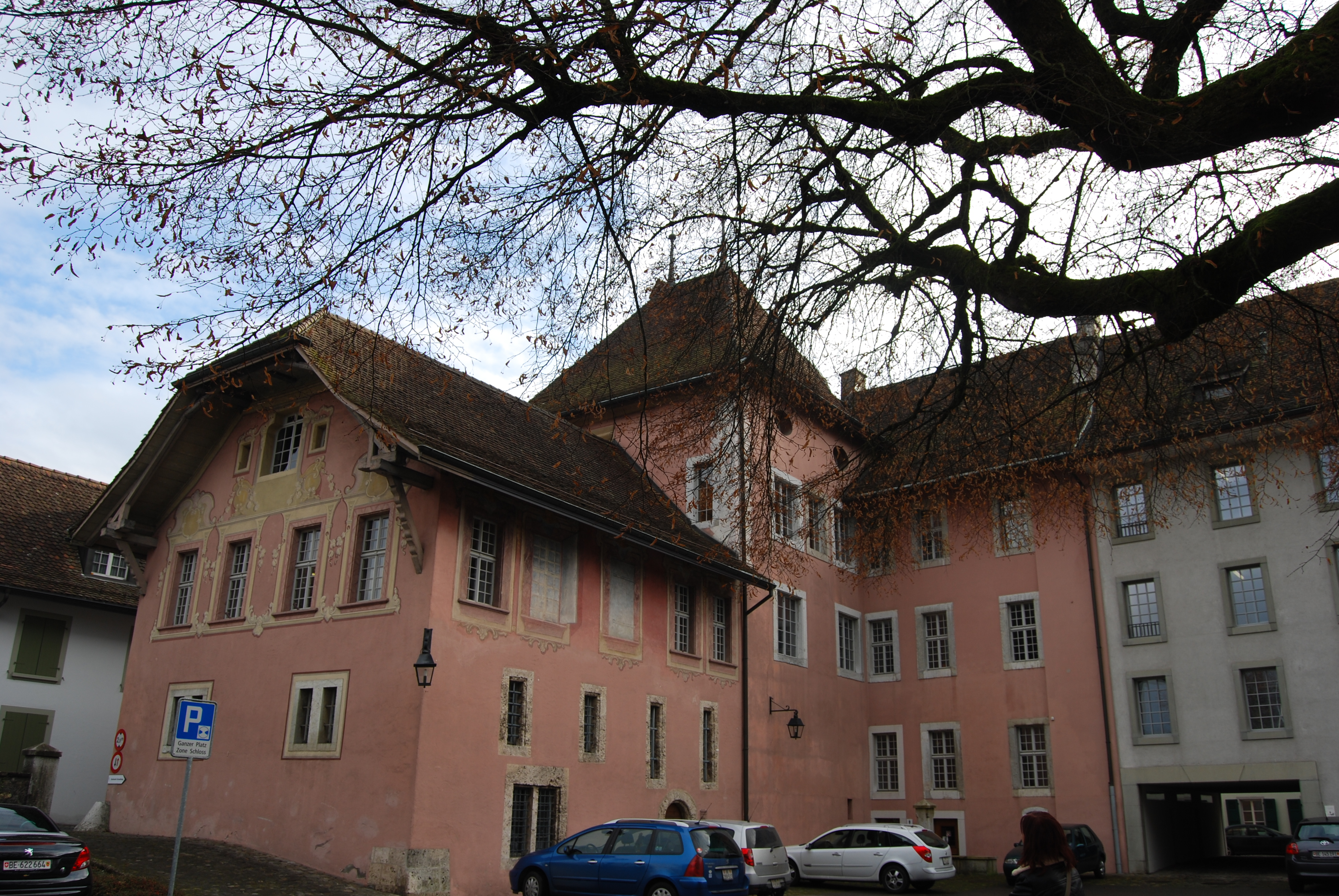
Wangen Castle

== See also ==
- List of castles in Switzerland
