= Wimmis =

- Municipality
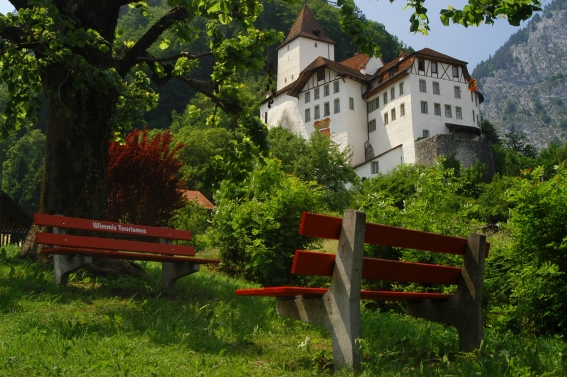
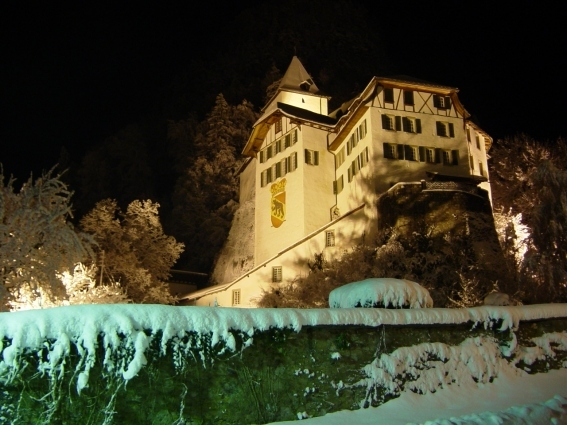
- Wimmis castle above the village Wimmis castle above the village

- Flag Coat of arms
- Location of Wimmis
- Location within Switzerland Location within Canton of Bern
- Coordinates: 46°40′N 7°38′E
- Country: Switzerland
- Canton: Bern
- District: Frutigen-Niedersimmental

Government
  - Executive: Gemeinderat with 7 members
  - Mayor: Gemeindepräsident(in); Bruno Stucki (as of 2026)

Area
  - Total: 22.3 km^{2} (8.6 sq mi)
- Elevation: 629 m (2,064 ft)

Population (December 2020)
  - Total: 2,609
  - Density: 117/km^{2} (303/sq mi)
- Time zone: UTC+01:00 (CET)
  - Summer (DST): UTC+02:00 (CEST)
- Postal code: 3752
- SFOS number: 769
- ISO 3166 code: CH-BE
- Surrounded by: Aeschi bei Spiez, Diemtigen, Erlenbach im Simmental, Reichenbach im Kandertal, Reutigen, Spiez
- Website: www.wimmis.ch

Wimmis (German pronunciation: [ˈvɪmɪs]) is a municipality in the Frutigen-Niedersimmental administrative district in the canton of Bern in Switzerland.

== History ==
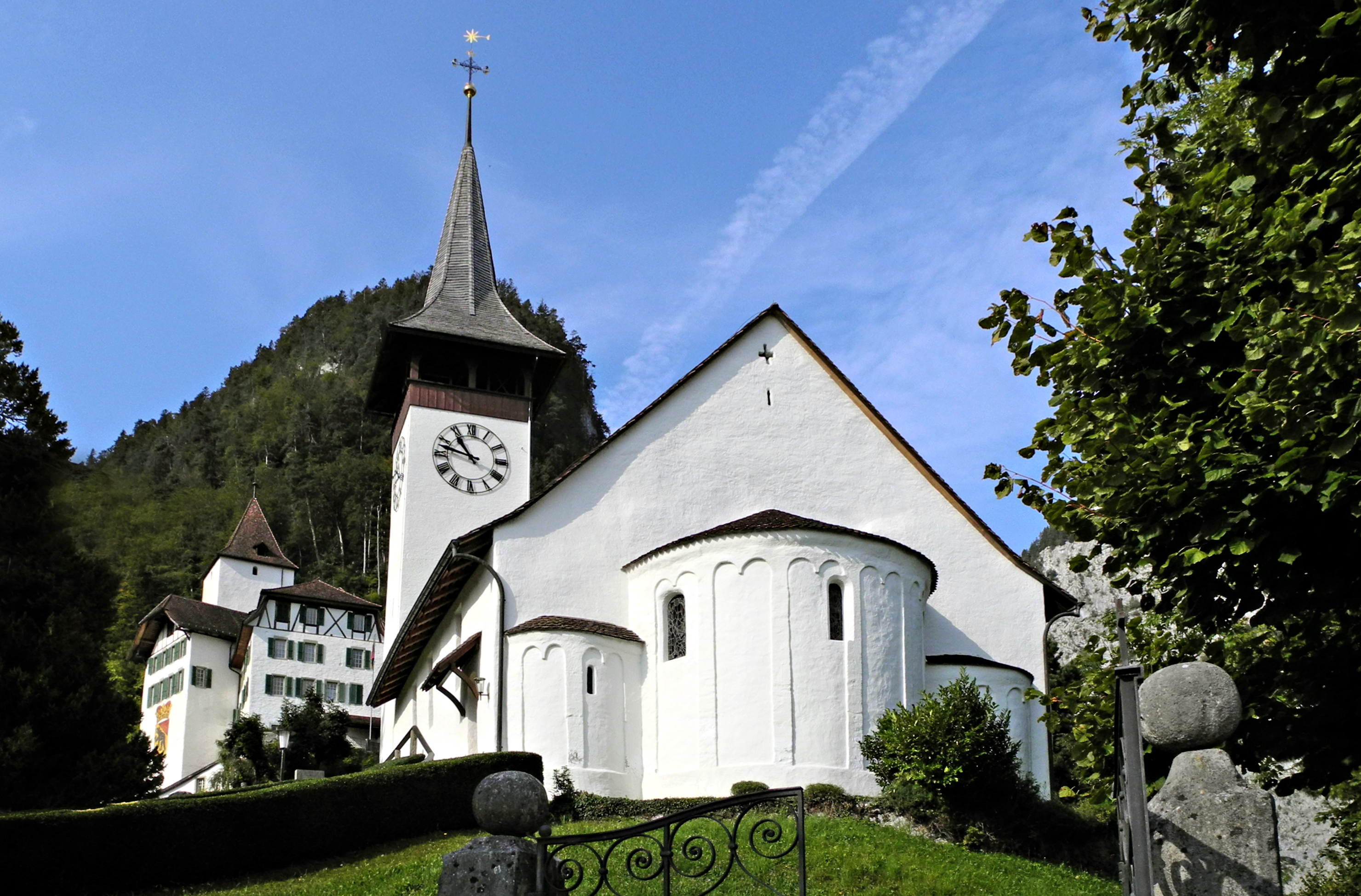
Wimmis church and castle

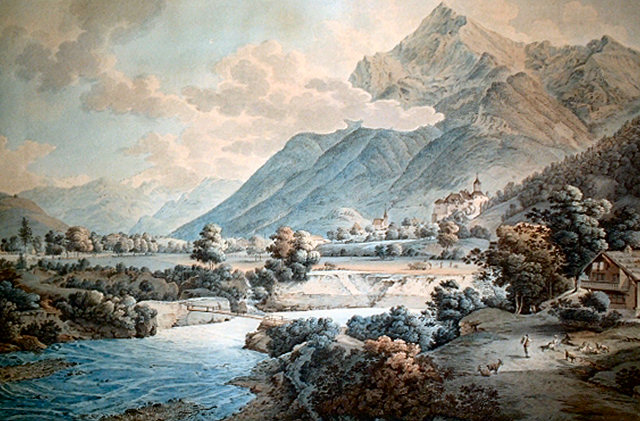
Engraving of Niesen mountain and Wimmis from around 1783, engraved by the Swiss painter Ludwig Aberli (1723-1786)

Aerial view from 800 m by Walter Mittelholzer (1919)

Wimmis is first mentioned in 994 as Windemis.

The oldest traces of a settlement in Wimmis include the Mesolithic and Bronze Age settlements on the Chienberg and the Bronze Age and High Middle Ages settlements on the Pintel. Roman era artifacts were found at Engfeld and bronze statue of Emperor Gordian III was found at Tägerstein. The area remained inhabited during the Middle Ages and in 994 King Otto III granted his estates in Wimmis to Selz Abbey.

By the 12th or 13th century the Lords of Wimmis or Strättligen built Wimmis Castle above the village. The exact relationship between the two families is unclear, but the Wimmis line became extinct in the mid-13th century and by 1260 the Freiherr von Strättligen owned Wimmis Castle and the surrounding lands. A few years later the castle and lands were incorporated into the extensive holdings of the Freiherr von Weissenburg. Over the following years, the town at the foot of the castle was attacked and burned twice by Bernese troops, in 1298 and 1334 and the castle was attacked and taken in 1334. After the war, Freiherr Johann the Elder von Weissenburg was forced to sign a treaty with Bern. The castle and surrounding bailiwick were inherited by the Freiherr von Brandis in 1368. However, in 1398 he sold a half share of the estates to the von Scharnachtal family and in 1437 sold the remaining half to them. The von Scharnachtals held the castle and bailiwick until Bern bought it back in 1449.

The castle church of St. Martin was first mentioned in 1228 as one of the twelve churches surrounding Lake Thun in the Strättliger Chronicle. The castle church was built in the 10th century on the site of an earlier 7th or 8th century church. It was expanded in the 14th century and again in the 15th. The murals are from the 15th century expansion. In 1527 it, along with the entire Niedersimmental converted to the new faith of the Protestant Reformation.

Under Bernese rule the castle became the center of the Niedersimmental district. During the 17th and 18th centuries the castle was expanded in several stages into its current appearance. In 1708 a fire broke out in the castle town, destroying the entire settlement around the castle. The castle town was abandoned and the current castle gardens were planted on the site. After the 1803 Act of Mediation, the castle became the center of new Niedersimmental district. In 1967 the district administration moved into a modern office building but the district court remained in the castle. In 2010 the administrative structure of the Canton of Bern changed. The court moved from Wimmis to Thun and the castle was given to the municipality.

Wimmis' location at the entrance to the Simmental made it into an important local trading center. In 1815 the construction of the Simmental road allowed more traffic to travel through Wimmis. A village school opened in 1859. In the 1870s it was envisioned as a railroad hub, before the hub was moved to Spiez. Between 1897 and 1902 the Spiez-Zweisimmen railway passed through the village and built stations at Wimmis and Eifeld. The railroad helped factories move into Wimmis. In 1919 the Swiss military established the Federal Gunpowder factory at Wimmis. In the 1990s it became Nitrochemie Wimmis, which in addition to producing smokeless powder, explosives and industrial chemicals is the world's largest paper deacidification facility.

During the Cold War, the Swiss military maintained a store of uranium in Wimmis, which was a part of its nuclear weapons programme.

== Geography ==
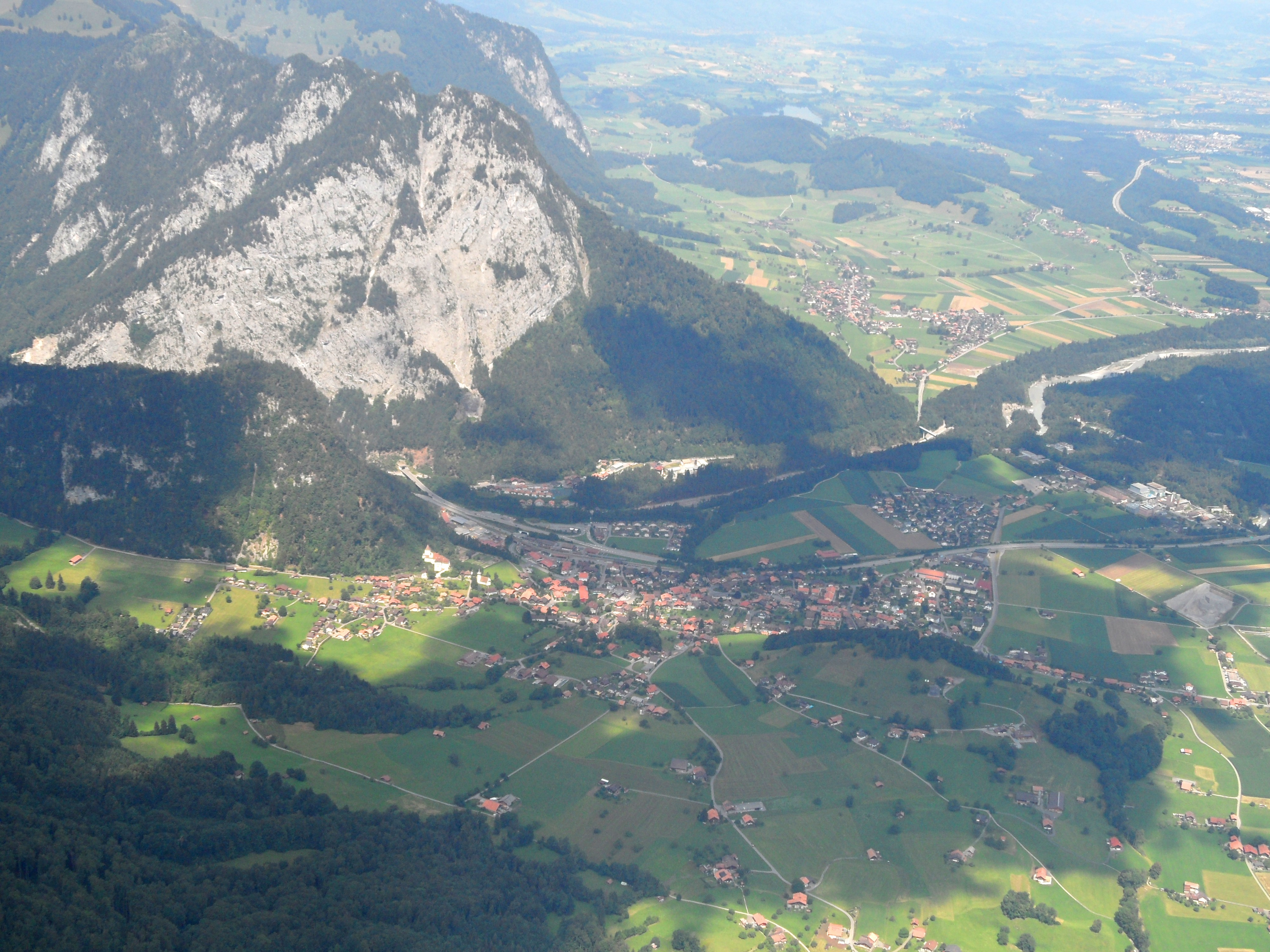
Aerial view of Wimmis

Wimmis is located between the Simmenfluh and Burgfluh rivers at the entrance to the Simmental. The municipal borders stretch up the flank of the Niesen mountain to its peak at 2,362 meters (7,749 ft). It consists of the village of Wimmis and the settlements of Oberdorf, Brodhüsi, Hasli and Burgholz.

The municipality has an area of 22.35 km^{2} (8.63 sq mi). As of 2012, a total of 6.46 km^{2} (2.49 mi^{2}) or 28.9% is used for agricultural purposes, while 10.5 km^{2} (4.1 mi^{2}) or 47.0% is forested. The rest of the municipality is 1.71 km^{2} (0.66 mi^{2}) or 7.7% is settled (buildings or roads), 0.35 km^{2} (0.14 mi^{2}) or 1.6% is either rivers or lakes and 3.31 km^{2} (1.28 mi^{2}) or 14.8% is unproductive land.

During the same year, industrial buildings made up 1.6% of the total area while housing and buildings made up 2.8% and transportation infrastructure made up 2.0%. Power and water infrastructure as well as other special developed areas made up 1.1% of the area A total of 43.3% of the total land area is heavily forested and 2.4% is covered with orchards or small clusters of trees. Of the agricultural land, 5.4% is used for growing crops and 14.9% is pasturage and 8.1% is used for alpine pastures. All the water in the municipality is flowing water. Of the unproductive areas, 8.2% is unproductive vegetation and 6.7% is too rocky for vegetation.

On 31 December 2009 Amtsbezirk Niedersimmental, the municipality's former district, was dissolved. On the following day, 1 January 2010, it joined the newly created Verwaltungskreis Frutigen-Niedersimmental.

== Coat of arms ==
The blazon of the municipal coat of arms is Gules a Castle embatteled Argent.

== Demographics ==
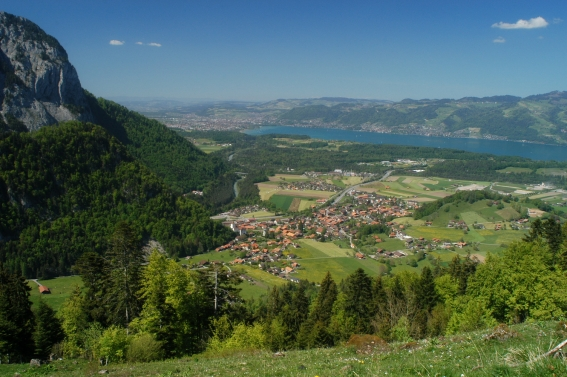
Wimmis village from the Niesen

Wimmis has a population (as of December 2020) of 2,609. As of 2010, 8.4% of the population are resident foreign nationals. Over the last 10 years (2001-2011) the population has changed at a rate of 3%. Migration accounted for 2.1%, while births and deaths accounted for 0.4%.

Most of the population (as of 2000) speaks German (2,223 or 96.1%) as their first language, Serbo-Croatian is the second most common (27 or 1.2%) and French is the third (15 or 0.6%). There are 15 people who speak Italian and 3 people who speak Romansh.

As of 2008, the population was 51.4% male and 48.6% female. The population was made up of 1,116 Swiss men (46.7% of the population) and 112 (4.7%) non-Swiss men. There were 1,074 Swiss women (44.9%) and 89 (3.7%) non-Swiss women. Of the population in the municipality, 714 or about 30.9% were born in Wimmis and lived there in 2000. There were 1,067 or 46.1% who were born in the same canton, while 288 or 12.4% were born somewhere else in Switzerland, and 171 or 7.4% were born outside of Switzerland.

As of 2011, children and teenagers (0–19 years old) make up 22.1% of the population, while adults (20–64 years old) make up 60.2% and seniors (over 64 years old) make up 17.7%.

As of 2000, there were 943 people who were single and never married in the municipality. There were 1,134 married individuals, 137 widows or widowers and 100 individuals who are divorced.

As of 2010, there were 322 households that consist of only one person and 67 households with five or more people. In 2000, a total of 916 apartments (88.8% of the total) were permanently occupied, while 82 apartments (8.0%) were seasonally occupied and 33 apartments (3.2%) were empty. As of 2010, the construction rate of new housing units was 7.1 new units per 1000 residents. The vacancy rate for the municipality, in 2012, was 0.58%. In 2011, single family homes made up 51.3% of the total housing in the municipality.

The historical population is given in the following chart:

== Heritage sites of national significance ==
The village church of Wimmis, the Letzi Spissi fortifications, and Wimmis Castle are listed as Swiss heritage site of national significance. The entire village of Wimmis is part of the Inventory of Swiss Heritage Sites.

The village church of St. Martin was built on the site of an early medieval church. Under the Kingdom of Upper Burgundy a fortified estate was built near the church and became a local administrative center. Around the 9th century the early church was replaced with a new building that had a wider aisle. In 994 King Otto III granted his estate and church in Wimmis to Selz Abbey. In the 1228 Strättliger Chronicle it was listed as one of the 12 Lake Thun churches. In the 13th century a fire destroyed the roof, though it was quickly replaced. It was converted into an aisleless church in 1450 and the wall murals are from the 15th century. The north-west corner houses a painting of the procession to Calvary and fragments of the Crucifixion and descent from the Cross. The church converted to the Reformed faith in 1527. The pulpit was built in 1672 and the baptismal font was carved in 1552.

The Letzi Spissi fortifications were built by Freiherr von Weissenburg about 1 kilometer (0.6 mile) south-west of the castle. It was built to help defend the entrance to the Niedersimmental.

The castle was built around the 12th or 13th century on or near the site of an earlier fortified estate. It was owned by the Freiherr von Strättligen and then the Freiherr von Weissenburg. In 1334 the town and castle were attacked and taken by Bernese troops. In 1449 Bern bought it from its current owner, the von Scharnachtal family. Under Bernese rule the castle became the center of the Niedersimmental district. During the 17th and 18th centuries the castle was expanded in several stages into its current appearance. After the 1803 Act of Mediation, the castle became the center of new Niedersimmental district. In 1967 the district administration moved into a modern office building but the district court remained in the castle. In 2010 the administrative structure of the Canton of Bern changed. The court moved from Wimmis to Thun and the castle was given to the municipality.

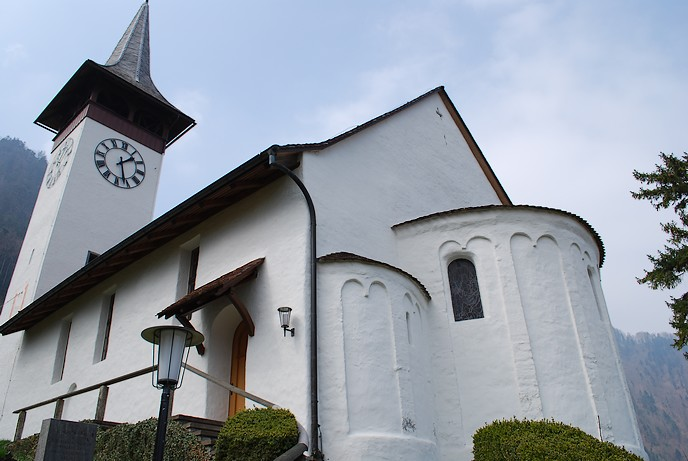
The village church

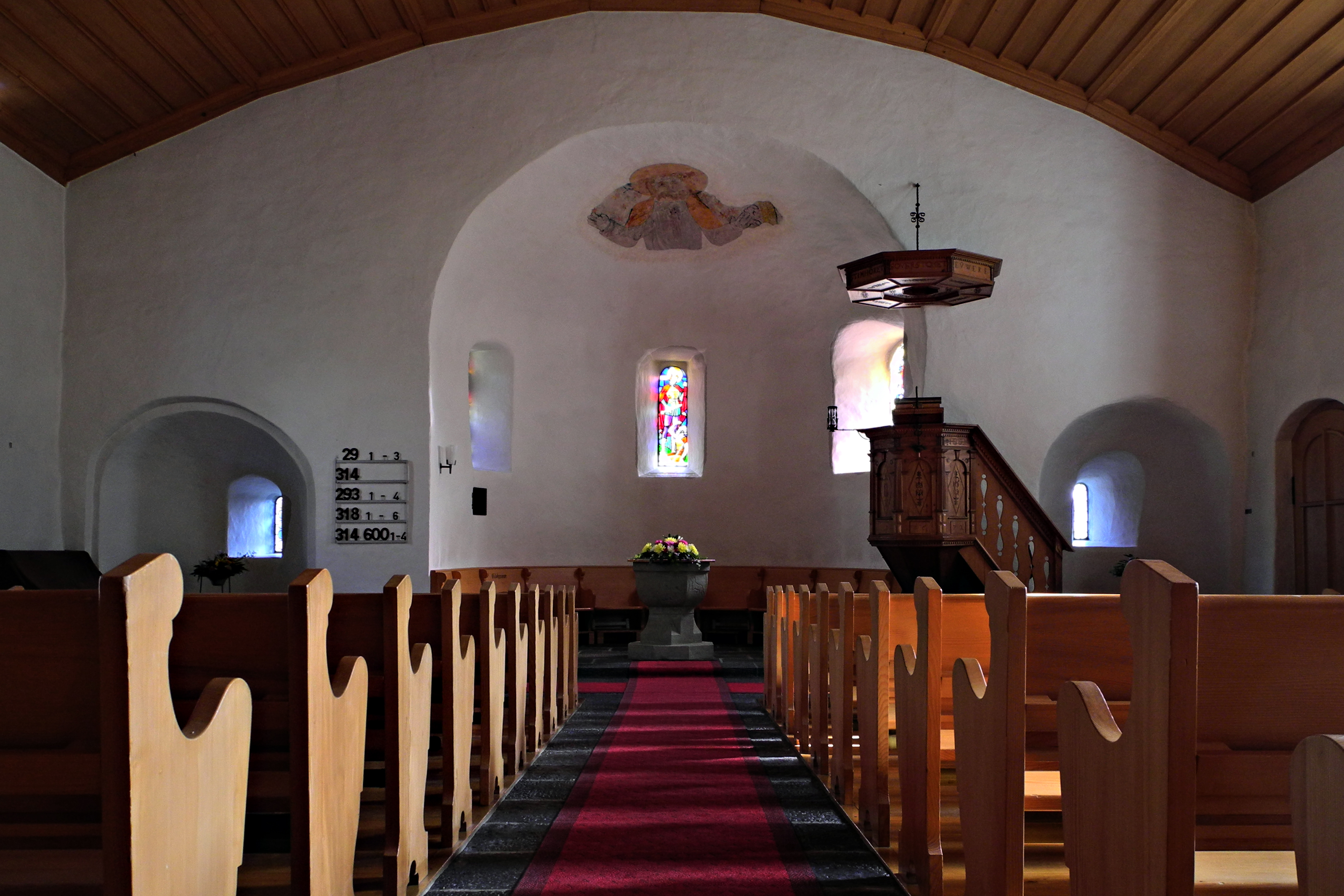
Interior of the village church, looking toward the choir

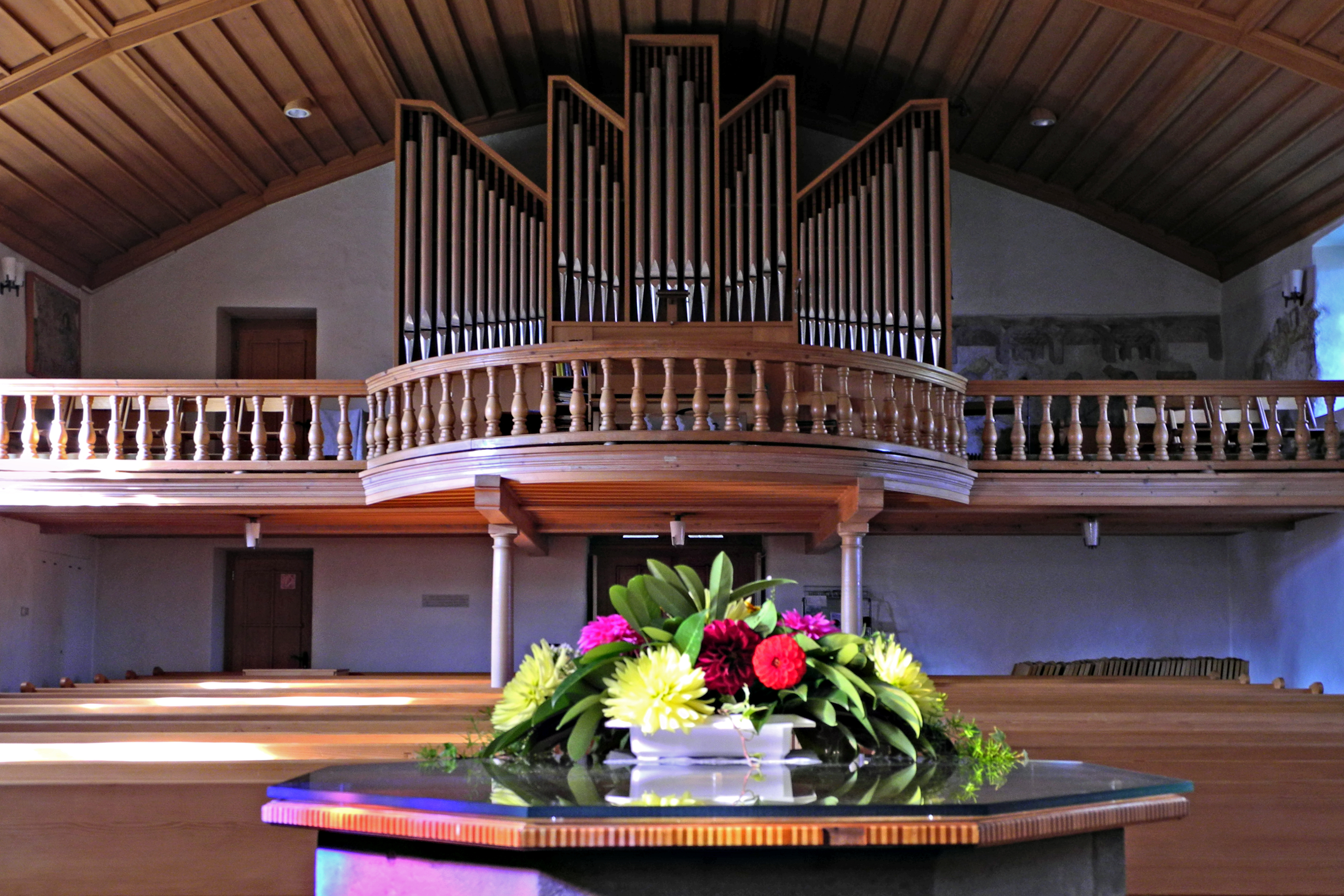
Interior of the village church, looking toward the back

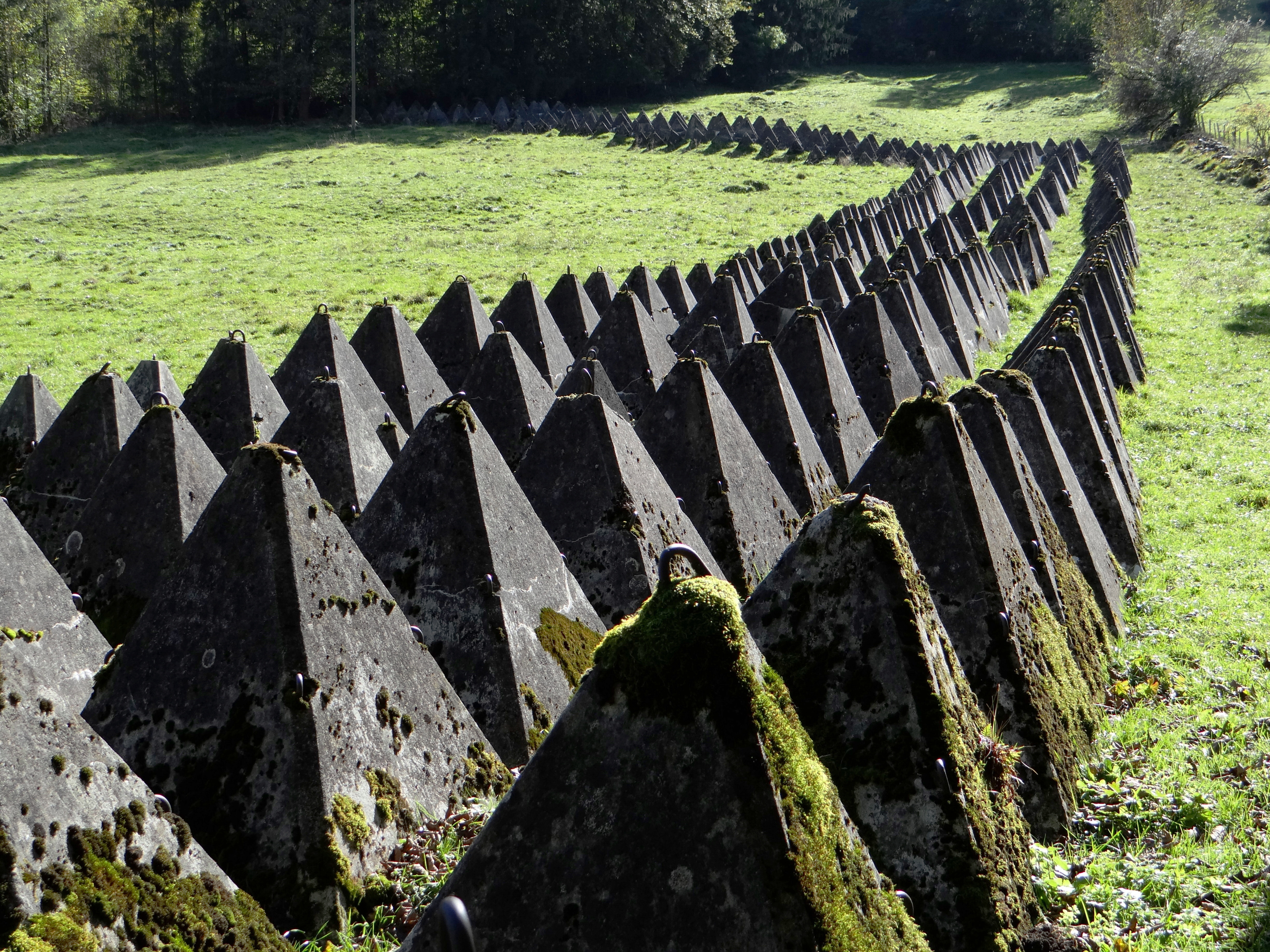
Site of the Letzi Spissi fortifications at Wimmis

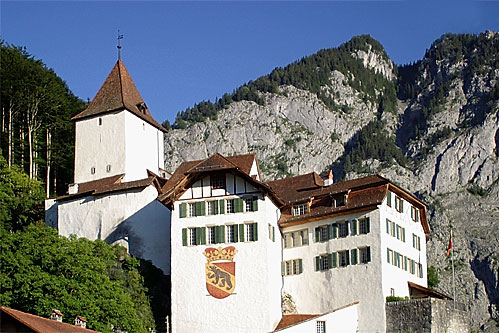
Wimmis Castle

== Politics ==
In the 2011 federal election the most popular party was the Swiss People's Party (SVP) which received 42.3% of the vote. The next three most popular parties were the Conservative Democratic Party (BDP) (16.8%), the Social Democratic Party (SP) (12.3%) and the Evangelical People's Party (EVP) (5.2%). In the federal election, a total of 920 votes were cast, and the voter turnout was 50.2%.

== Economy ==
As of 2011, Wimmis had an unemployment rate of 1.88%. As of 2008, there were a total of 1,081 people employed in the municipality. Of these, there were 90 people employed in the primary economic sector and about 29 businesses involved in this sector. 683 people were employed in the secondary sector and there were 40 businesses in this sector. 308 people were employed in the tertiary sector, with 69 businesses in this sector. There were 1,133 residents of the municipality who were employed in some capacity, of which females made up 39.0% of the workforce.

In 2008 there were a total of 948 full-time equivalent jobs. The number of jobs in the primary sector was 59, of which 55 were in agriculture and 4 were in forestry or lumber production. The number of jobs in the secondary sector was 639 of which 345 or (54.0%) were in manufacturing, 77 or (12.1%) were in mining and 160 (25.0%) were in construction. The number of jobs in the tertiary sector was 250. In the tertiary sector; 86 or 34.4% were in wholesale or retail sales or the repair of motor vehicles, 13 or 5.2% were in the movement and storage of goods, 23 or 9.2% were in a hotel or restaurant, 7 or 2.8% were the insurance or financial industry, 20 or 8.0% were technical professionals or scientists, 34 or 13.6% were in education and 26 or 10.4% were in health care.

In 2000, there were 708 workers who commuted into the municipality and 724 workers who commuted away. The municipality is a net exporter of workers, with about 1.0 workers leaving the municipality for every one entering. A total of 409 workers (36.6% of the 1,117 total workers in the municipality) both lived and worked in Wimmis. Of the working population, 15.1% used public transportation to get to work, and 55.6% used a private car.

In 2011 the average local and cantonal tax rate on a married resident, with two children, of Wimmis making 150,000 CHF was 12.6%, while an unmarried resident's rate was 18.5%. For comparison, the average rate for the entire canton in the same year, was 14.2% and 22.0%, while the nationwide average was 12.3% and 21.1% respectively.

In 2009 there were a total of 989 tax payers in the municipality. Of that total, 272 made over 75,000 CHF per year. There were 9 people who made between 15,000 and 20,000 per year. The greatest number of workers, 304, made between 50,000 and 75,000 CHF per year. The average income of the over 75,000 CHF group in Wimmis was 102,451 CHF, while the average across all of Switzerland was 130,478 CHF.

In 2011 a total of 5.5% of the population received direct financial assistance from the government.

== Religion ==
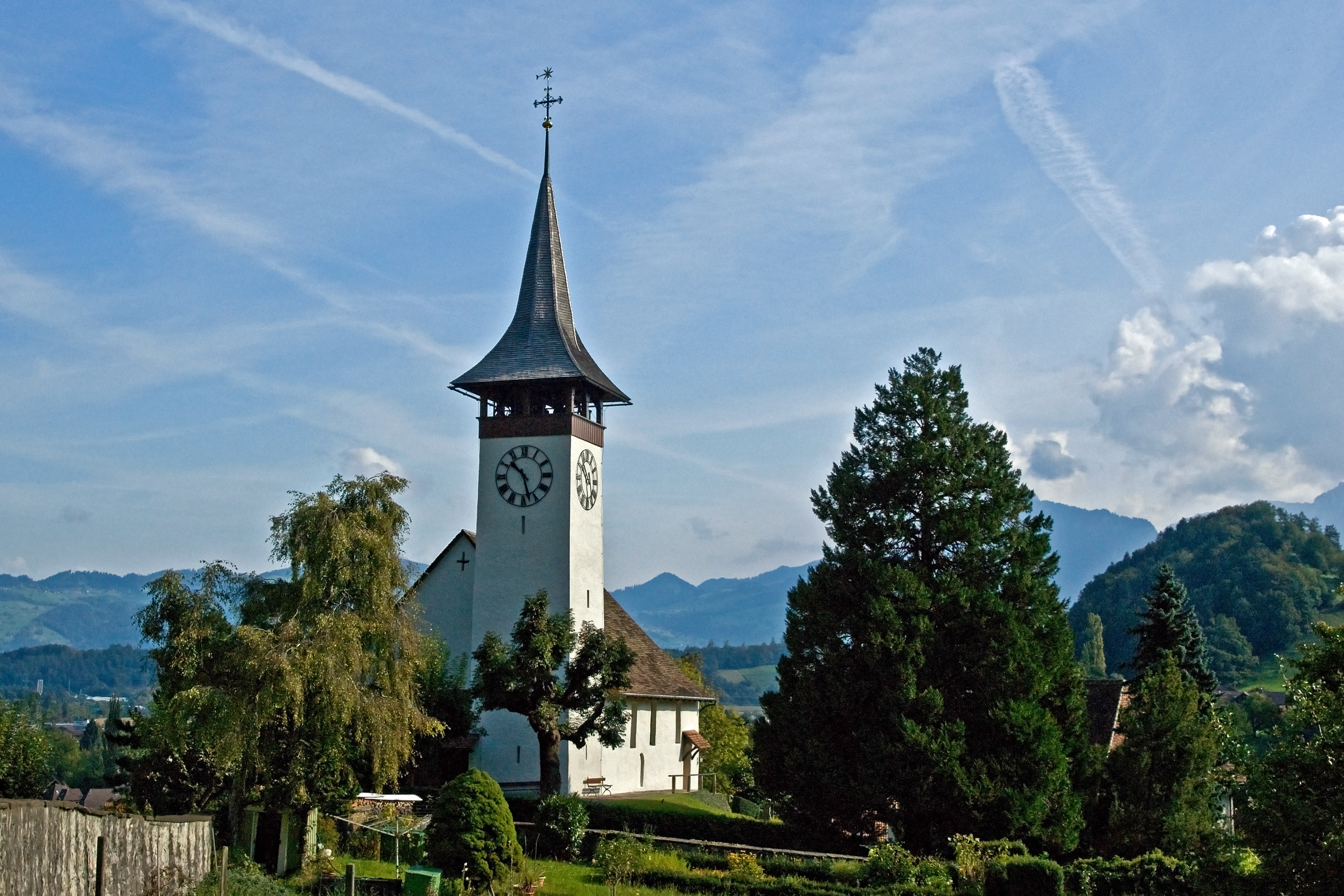
Wimmis castle church

From the 2000 census, 1,771 or 76.5% belonged to the Swiss Reformed Church, while 211 or 9.1% were Roman Catholic. Of the rest of the population, there were 15 members of an Orthodox church (or about 0.65% of the population), there was 1 individual who belongs to the Christian Catholic Church, and there were 79 individuals (or about 3.41% of the population) who belonged to another Christian church. There were 44 (or about 1.90% of the population) who were Muslim. There were 2 individuals who belonged to another church. 110 (or about 4.75% of the population) belonged to no church, are agnostic or atheist, and 81 individuals (or about 3.50% of the population) did not answer the question.

== Transport ==
Wimmis sits on the Spiez–Zweisimmen line and is served by trains at the Wimmis and Eifeld railway stations.

== Climate ==
Between 1981 and 2010 Wimmis had an average of 138.8 days of rain or snow per year and on average received 1,396 mm (55.0 in) of precipitation. The wettest month was July during which time Wimmis received an average of 167 mm (6.6 in) of rain or snow. During this month there was precipitation for an average of 12.9 days. The month with the most days of precipitation was June, with an average of 14.2, but with only 161 mm (6.3 in) of rain or snow. The driest month of the year was February with an average of 83 mm (3.3 in) of precipitation over 9.8 days.

== Education ==
In Wimmis about 59.8% of the population have completed non-mandatory upper secondary education, and 14.1% have completed additional higher education (either university or a Fachhochschule). Of the 199 who had completed some form of tertiary schooling listed in the census, 74.9% were Swiss men, 20.1% were Swiss women, 4.0% were non-Swiss men.

The Canton of Bern school system provides one year of non-obligatory Kindergarten, followed by six years of Primary school. This is followed by three years of obligatory lower Secondary school where the students are separated according to ability and aptitude. Following the lower Secondary students may attend additional schooling or they may enter an apprenticeship.

During the 2011-12 school year, there were a total of 309 students attending classes in Wimmis. There were 2 kindergarten classes with a total of 39 students in the municipality. Of the kindergarten students, 10.3% were permanent or temporary residents of Switzerland (not citizens) and 7.7% have a different mother language than the classroom language. The municipality had 7 primary classes and 145 students. Of the primary students, 11.7% were permanent or temporary residents of Switzerland (not citizens) and 10.3% have a different mother language than the classroom language. During the same year, there were 7 lower secondary classes with a total of 125 students. There were 5.6% who were permanent or temporary residents of Switzerland (not citizens) and 5.6% have a different mother language than the classroom language.

As of 2000, there were a total of 231 students attending any school in the municipality. Of those, 138 both lived and attended school in the municipality, while 93 students came from another municipality. During the same year, 216 residents attended schools outside the municipality.

Wimmis is home to the Dorfbibliothek Wimmis library. The library has (as of 2008) 6,490 books or other media, and loaned out 16,904 items in the same year. It was open a total of 156 days with average of 8 hours per week during that year.
