= Wimmis Castle =

Castle in Wimmis in Bern, Switzerland

- Schloss Wimmis
- Wimmis
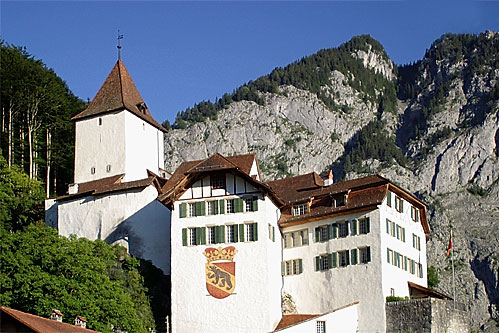
- Wimmis Castle

Site information
- Type: Castle
- Owner: Municipality of Wimmis
- Open to the public: occasional tours

Location
- Coordinates: 46.67251°N 7.63448°E

Site history
- Built: 12th-13th century
- Built by: Lords of Wimmis/Strättligen
- Materials: stone

Wimmis Castle is a castle in the municipality of Wimmis of the Canton of Bern in Switzerland. It is a Swiss heritage site of national significance.

== History ==
By the 12th or 13th century the Lords of Wimmis or Strättligen built Wimmis Castle above the village. The exact relationship between the two families is unclear, but the Wimmis line became extinct in the mid-13th century and by 1260 the Freiherr von Strättligen owned Wimmis Castle and the surrounding lands. A few years later the castle and lands were incorporated into the extensive holdings of the Freiherr von Weissenburg. Over the following years, the town at the foot of the castle was attacked and burned twice by Bernese troops, in 1298 and 1334 and the castle was attacked and taken in 1334. After the war, Freiherr Johann the Elder von Weissenburg was forced to sign a treaty with Bern. The castle and surrounding bailiwick were inherited by the Freiherr von Brandis in 1368. However, in 1398 he sold a half share of the estates to the von Scharnachtal family and in 1437 sold the remaining half to them. The von Scharnachtals held the castle and bailiwick until Bern bought it back in 1449.

Under Bernese rule the castle became the center of the Niedersimmental district. During the 17th and 18th centuries the castle was expanded in several stages into its current appearance. In 1708 a fire broke out in the castle town, destroying the entire settlement around the castle. The castle town was abandoned and the current castle gardens were planted on the site. After the 1803 Act of Mediation, the castle became the center of new Niedersimmental district. In 1967 the district administration moved into a modern office building but the district court remained in the castle. In 2010 the administrative structure of the Canton of Bern changed. The court moved from Wimmis to Thun and the castle was given to the municipality.

== Construction history ==
The castle probably grew out of an early medieval church and fortified estate that was built on hill above Wimmis. The original castle consisted of a Bergfried, attached living quarters and a wall. After it passed to the Freiherr von Weissenburg, Rudolf III expanded the castle. He encircled it with a double curtain wall and built the detached Letzi Spissi wall about 1 kilometer (0.6 mile) south-west of the castle. The Letzi Spissi was built to help defend the entrance to the Niedersimmental.

After the castle was acquired by Bern it was converted into the residence of the Bernese Vogt. It was expanded and renovated throughout the 15th to 17th centuries. During the 15th and 16th centuries, the outer wall was rebuilt and the Vogt's residence was expanded and renovated. The original gatehouse which faced west was replaced with a long covered stairway on the south side. In 1696, Vogt Albrecht Manuel had the south residence wing built. In 1741-42 the Vogt, Franz Ludwig Steiger, built the large north-east wing. The castle was renovated and expanded in 1789–90, again in 1949-51 and finally in 1984–87.

== See also ==
- List of castles in Switzerland
