= Ringgenberg Castle =

Swiss castle ruin and church building

- Burgruine Ringgenberg
- Ringgenberg
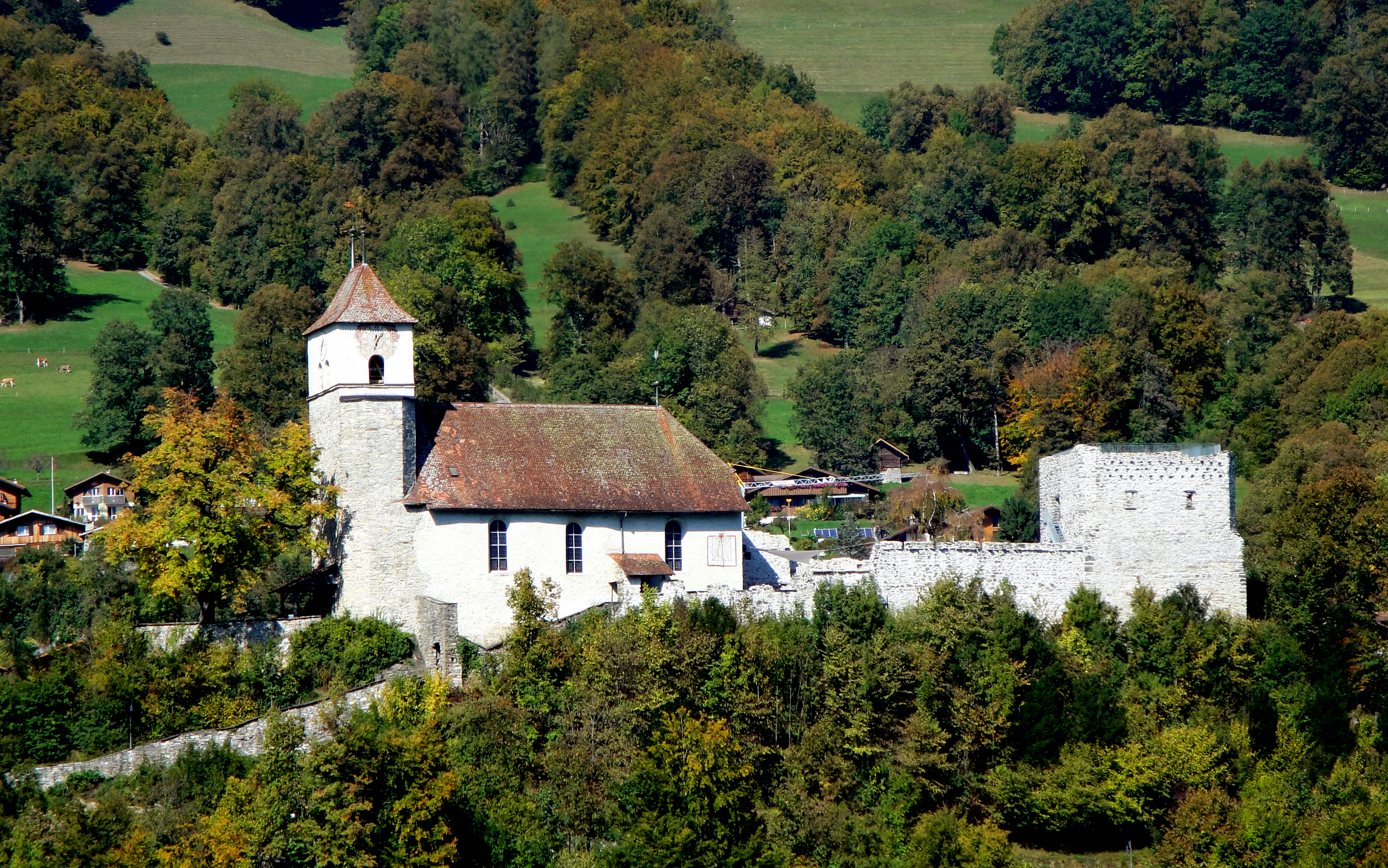
- Ringgenberg Castle

Site information
- Type: Ruins / Church
- Owner: Canton of Bern
- Open to the public: yes
- Condition: Ruined fortification / working church

Location
- Coordinates: 46.700988°N 7.897057°E

Site history
- Built: 12th century
- Built by: Counts of Ringgenberg
- In use: 1240–1386
- Materials: stone
- Battles/wars: Ringgenberg Affair (1386)

Ringgenberg Castle is a castle in the municipality of Ringgenberg of the Canton of Bern in Switzerland. It is a Swiss heritage site of national significance.

== History ==
The rocky heights above Brienz Lake were first occupied and fortified by the Late-Bronze Age.

During the Middle Ages, the land around the castle was owned by the Barons of Brienz and Raron. Around 1231, they moved to Ringgenberg village and soon thereafter into the castle. Ringgenberg Castle was probably built in several stages during the 12th century. It first appears in the historical record in 1240.

During the 13th century, the Counts of Ringgenberg expanded their power, often at the expense of Interlaken Monastery. The ruin of the estate began in the time of Philipp von Ringgenberg (1351–1374). In 1351 part of the estate was sold to the monastery. In 1381 Ringgenberg castle was burnt and plundered by troops from the Canton of Uri, and Count Petermann von Ringgenberg was taken in chains to Obwalden. In 1386, the castle and lands were assigned to Bern. However, the city lacked the funds to rebuild the burned castle, and in 1411 and 1439 parts of the castle and village were sold to Interlaken. A few years later, in 1445, Bern reacquired the land but lost it again in 1457.

In 1528, the city of Bern adopted the new faith of the Protestant Reformation and began imposing it on the Bernese Oberland. Ringgenberg joined many other villages and the monastery in an unsuccessful rebellion against the new faith. After Bern imposed its will on the Oberland, they secularized the monastery and annexed all the monastery lands. Ringgenberg became a part of the Bernese bailiwick of Interlaken.

The church was built in the ruins of Ringgenberg Castle in 1670 under the architect Abraham Dunz. Dunz incorporated the castle walls and one of the wall towers into the new village church.

The castle ruins were repaired and renovated in 1928, 1946–49, and 2006–08.

== See also ==
- List of castles in Switzerland
