= Wohlen bei Bern =

- Municipality
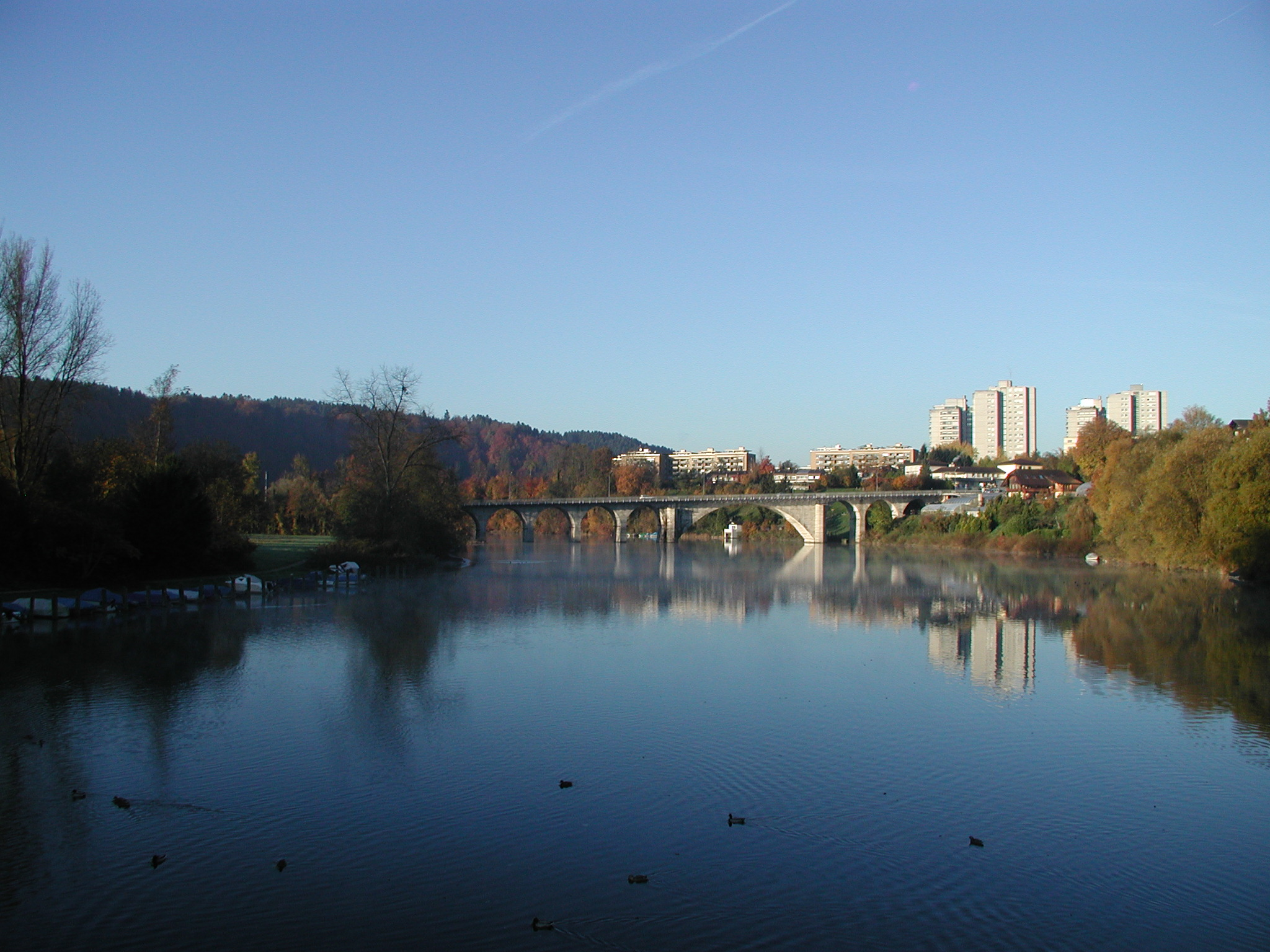

- Flag Coat of arms
- Location of Wohlen bei Bern
- Location within Switzerland Location within Canton of Bern
- Coordinates: 46°58′N 7°21′E
- Country: Switzerland
- Canton: Bern
- District: Bern-Mittelland

Government
  - Executive: Gemeinderat with 7 members
  - Mayor: Gemeindepräsident(in); Müller Stefan (as of 2026)

Area
  - Total: 36.30 km^{2} (14.02 sq mi)
- Elevation: 547 m (1,795 ft)

Population (December 2020)
  - Total: 9,240
  - Density: 255/km^{2} (659/sq mi)
- Time zone: UTC+01:00 (CET)
  - Summer (DST): UTC+02:00 (CEST)
- Postal code: 3033
- SFOS number: 360
- ISO 3166 code: CH-BE
- Localities: Hinterkappelen, Illiswil, Innerberg, Möriswil, Murzelen, Oberdettigen, Säriswil, Steinisweg, Uettligen, Unterdettigen, Weissenstein, Wickacker
- Surrounded by: Bern, Frauenkappelen, Kirchlindach, Meikirch, Mühleberg, Radelfingen, Seedorf
- Website: www.wohlen-be.ch

Wohlen bei Bern is a municipality in the Bern-Mittelland administrative district in the canton of Bern in Switzerland.

== History ==
Wohlen bei Bern is first mentioned in 1275 as Wolun.

There were several prehistoric settlements near Wohlen. The earliest evidence includes several neolithic stone axes, Bronze Age axes and Hallstatt and La Tène burial mounds. During the Roman era a settlement spread across much of the current municipality. Based on the similar bricks and tiles, it appears that there was a brick works in the area. A Roman graveyard has been discovered at Uettligen with about 30-40 burials and 1st or 2nd century pottery. The next trace of a settlement is a 7th-century graveyard in Hinterkappelen.

During the High Middle Ages there were wooden castles at Ballmoos, Sandbühl, Heugraben and Aspitanne, which were probably fiefs of the court at Oltigen. Between 1410 and 1412 the entire bailiwick of Oltigen was acquired by Bern. Bern controlled the low courts at Säriswil and Frieswil, but not the private Herrschafts of Illiswil and Dettigen. Dettigen was owned by a number of Bernese patrician families. In 1748, they sold the court and rights over the village to Bern, but retained ownership of the manor house or Schlössli. During the 19th century, Illiswil and Dettigen were gradually incorporated into the political municipality.

=== Illiswil ===
Illiswil was first mentioned in 1269 as Igliswile. The seat of the former Herrschaft is located on the right bank of the river Aare. The Herrschaft was not part of the bailiwick of Oltigen, and did not come under Bernese control when the rest of the bailiwick did in 1412. By 1351, Illiswil was owned by a Bernese patrician family. Through marriages and inheritances the Herrschaft was divided into shares which were often owned by several families at once. For example, in 1550 the Willading and May families shared Illiswil, while in 1672 it was shared between the Bucher and von Erlach. In 1719, Hieronymus von Erlach acquired the shares from the heirs of Johann Rudolf Bucher and thereby became the only owner of Illiswil. He then traded Illiswil to the city of Bern in 1721 and received Moosseedorf.

=== Hinterkapplen ===
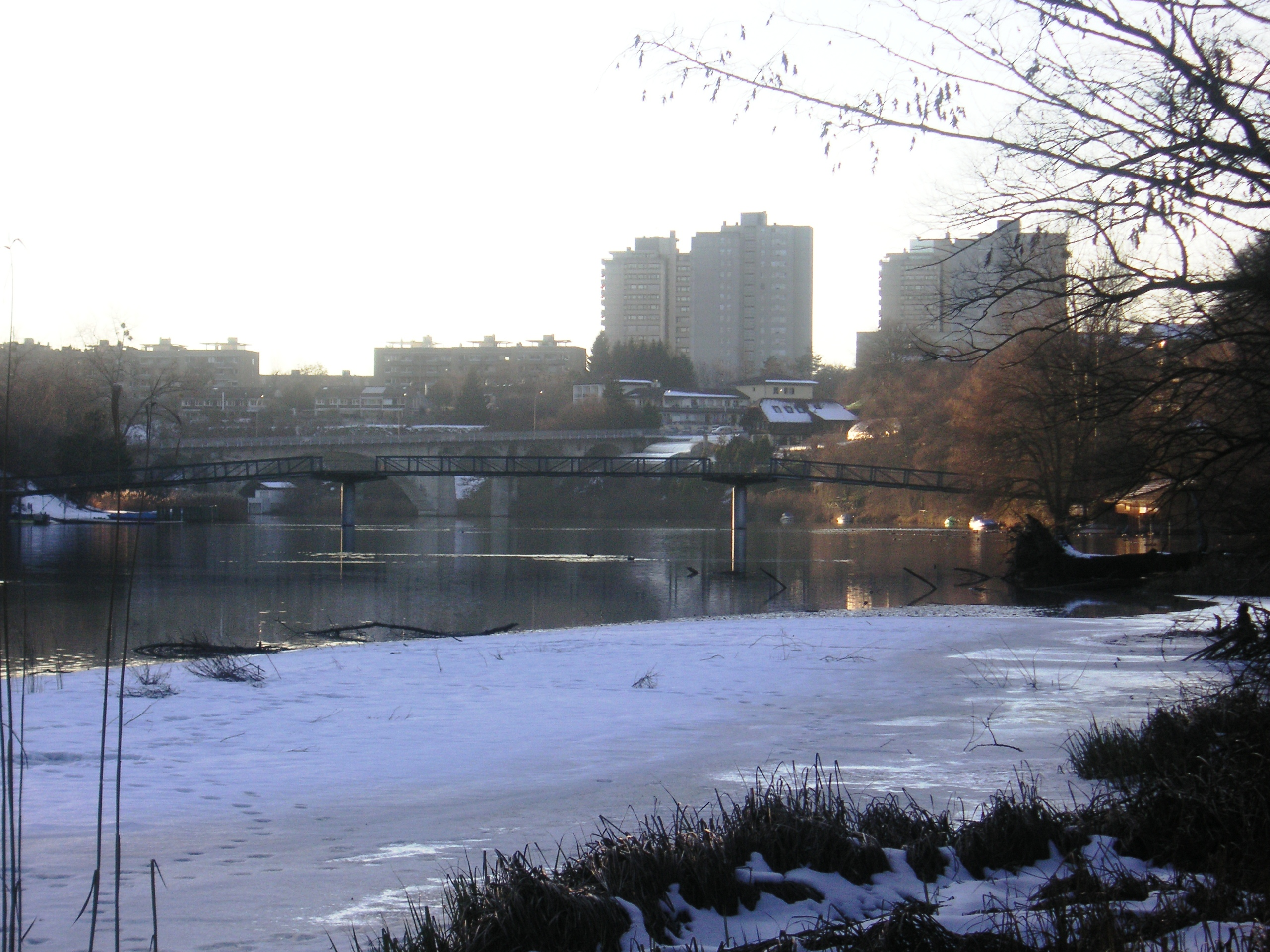
High rise apartments of Kappelenring in Hinterkapplen village

Hinterkapplen village was first mentioned in 1479 as Cappellen and after the 17th century it was known as Hinder Cappellen. An Augustinian priory was mentioned at Hinterkappelen in 1281. While the priory buildings no longer exist, it is likely that the priory chapel led to the Cappellen name. It was part of the Herrschaft of Illiswil. Since the Middle Ages, it was an important stopping point on the Bern-Aarberg road. During the 1960s, the character of the village changed with the large Kappelenring housing development which added about 1,200 apartments. Kappelenring was followed by the Hintere and Vordere Aumatt, Bennenboden, Reitenrain, Wyhalen and Schlossmatte housing projects, which turned Hinterkapplen into a major bedroom community for Bern. In 1960, the population of the village was about 600 while in 2003 it was 4,323.

== Geography ==
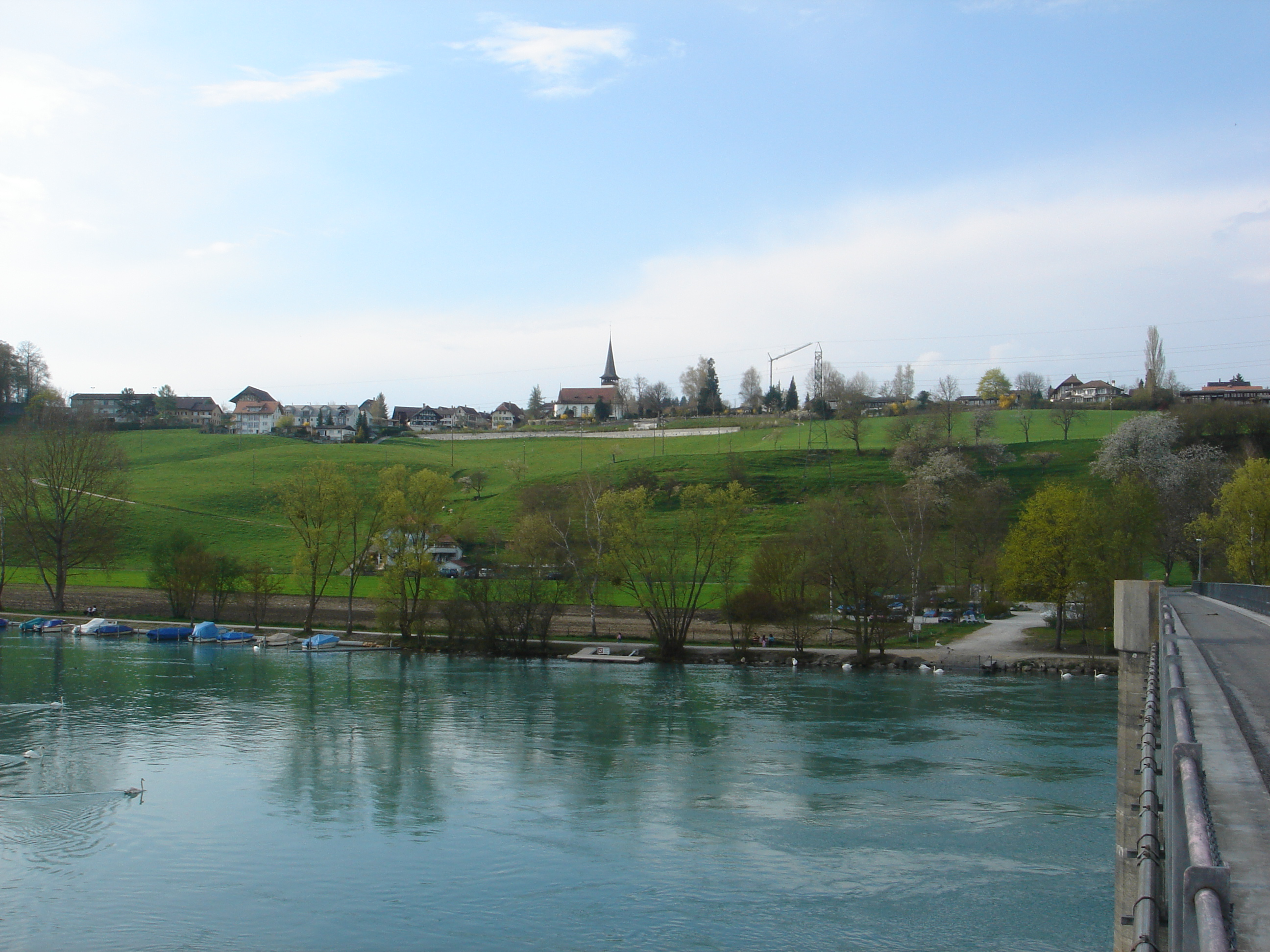
Lake Wohlen and Wohlen bei Bern

Wohlen bei Bern has an area of 36.32 km^{2} (14.02 sq mi). Of this area, 19.81 km^{2} (7.65 mi^{2}) or 54.6% is used for agricultural purposes, while 11.84 km^{2} (4.57 mi^{2}) or 32.6% is forested. Of the rest of the land, 3.02 km^{2} (1.17 mi^{2}) or 8.3% is settled (buildings or roads), 1.47 km^{2} (0.57 mi^{2}) or 4.1% is either rivers or lakes and 0.08 km^{2} (20 acres) or 0.2% is unproductive land.

Of the built up area, housing and buildings made up 5.2% and transportation infrastructure made up 2.2%. Out of the forested land, all of the forested land area is covered with heavy forests. Of the agricultural land, 41.7% is used for growing crops and 11.2% is pastures, while 1.8% is used for orchards or vine crops. Of the water in the municipality, 3.8% is in lakes and 0.2% is in rivers and streams.

The municipality is a suburb of Bern. It stretches over the Frienisberg to a series of small terraces on the right bank of Lake Wohlen. It consists of around two dozen villages and hamlets of including; Hinterkappelen, Uettligen, Wohlen, Möriswil, Säriswil, Illiswil, Murzelen and Innerberg. In the summer, residents of Wohlen can often be seen relaxing and swimming in the lake, floating around on dinghies and barbecuing.

On 31 December 2009 Amtsbezirk Bern, the municipality's former district, was dissolved. On the following day, 1 January 2010, it joined the newly created Verwaltungskreis Bern-Mittelland.

== Coat of arms ==
The blazon of the municipal coat of arms is Per chevron embowed Azure a Sun and Moon Or and of the second a letter W of the first.

== Demographics ==
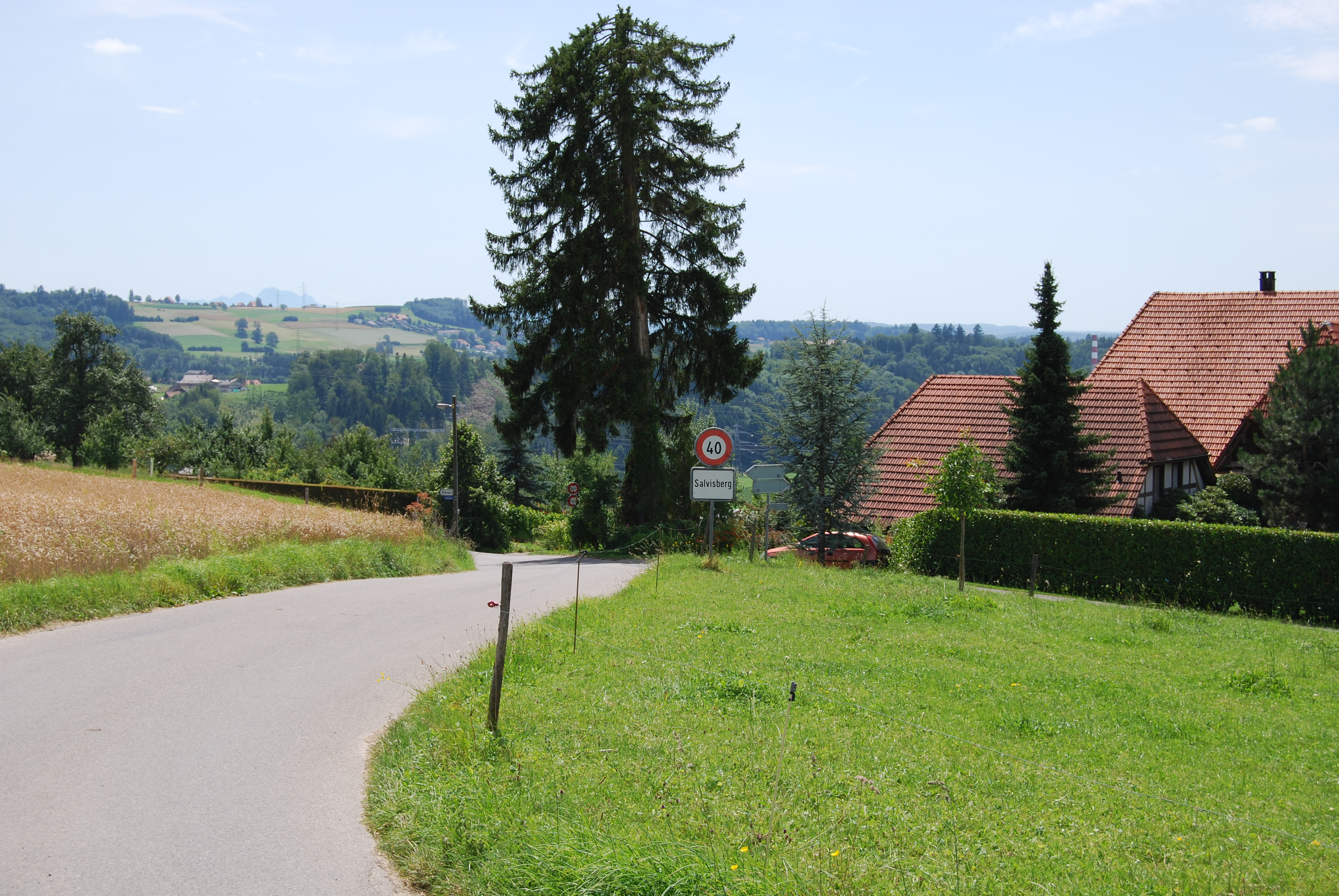
Half-timbered houses in Salvisberg hamlet

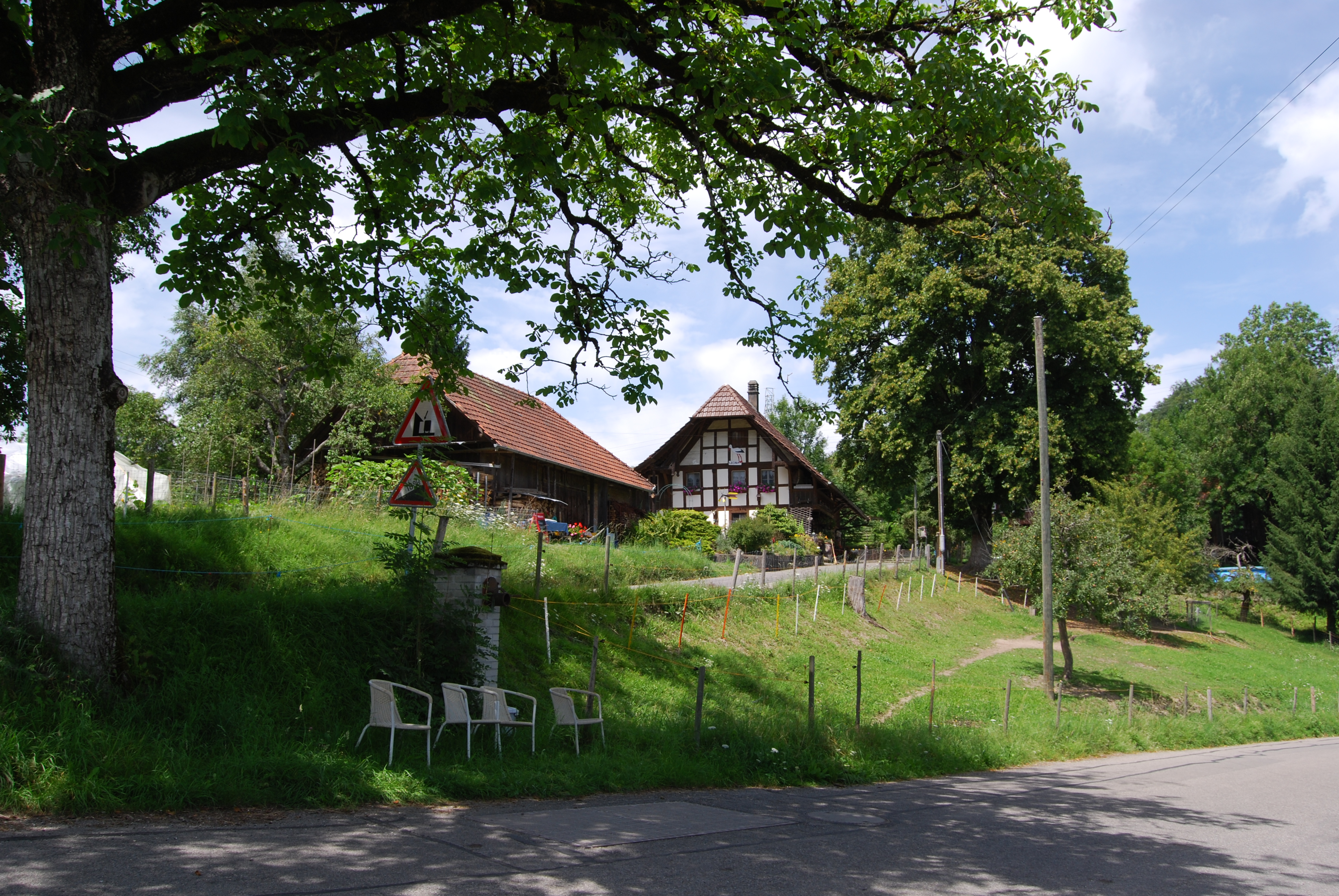
Houses in Wickacker hamlet

Wohlen bei Bern has a population (as of December 2020) of 9,240. As of 2010, 8.3% of the population are resident foreign nationals. Over the last 10 years (2000-2010) the population has changed at a rate of -0.2%. Migration accounted for 1.4%, while births and deaths accounted for 0.2%.

Most of the population (as of 2000) speaks German (8,250 or 92.2%) as their first language, French is the second most common (164 or 1.8%) and Italian is the third (85 or 0.9%). There are 5 people who speak Romansh.

As of 2008, the population was 48.6% male and 51.4% female. The population was made up of 3,944 Swiss men (44.2% of the population) and 394 (4.4%) non-Swiss men. There were 4,238 Swiss women (47.5%) and 344 (3.9%) non-Swiss women. Of the population in the municipality, 2,094 or about 23.4% were born in Wohlen bei Bern and lived there in 2000. There were 3,920 or 43.8% who were born in the same canton, while 1,631 or 18.2% were born somewhere else in Switzerland, and 1,070 or 12.0% were born outside of Switzerland.

As of 2010, children and teenagers (0–19 years old) make up 18.8% of the population, while adults (20–64 years old) make up 59.5% and seniors (over 64 years old) make up 21.7%.

As of 2000, there were 3,558 people who were single and never married in the municipality. There were 4,526 married individuals, 413 widows or widowers and 455 individuals who are divorced.

As of 2000, there were 997 households that consist of only one person and 247 households with five or more people. In 2000, a total of 3,579 apartments (91.9% of the total) were permanently occupied, while 207 apartments (5.3%) were seasonally occupied and 108 apartments (2.8%) were empty. The vacancy rate for the municipality, in 2011, was 0.38%.

The historical population is given in the following chart:

== Heritage sites of national significance ==
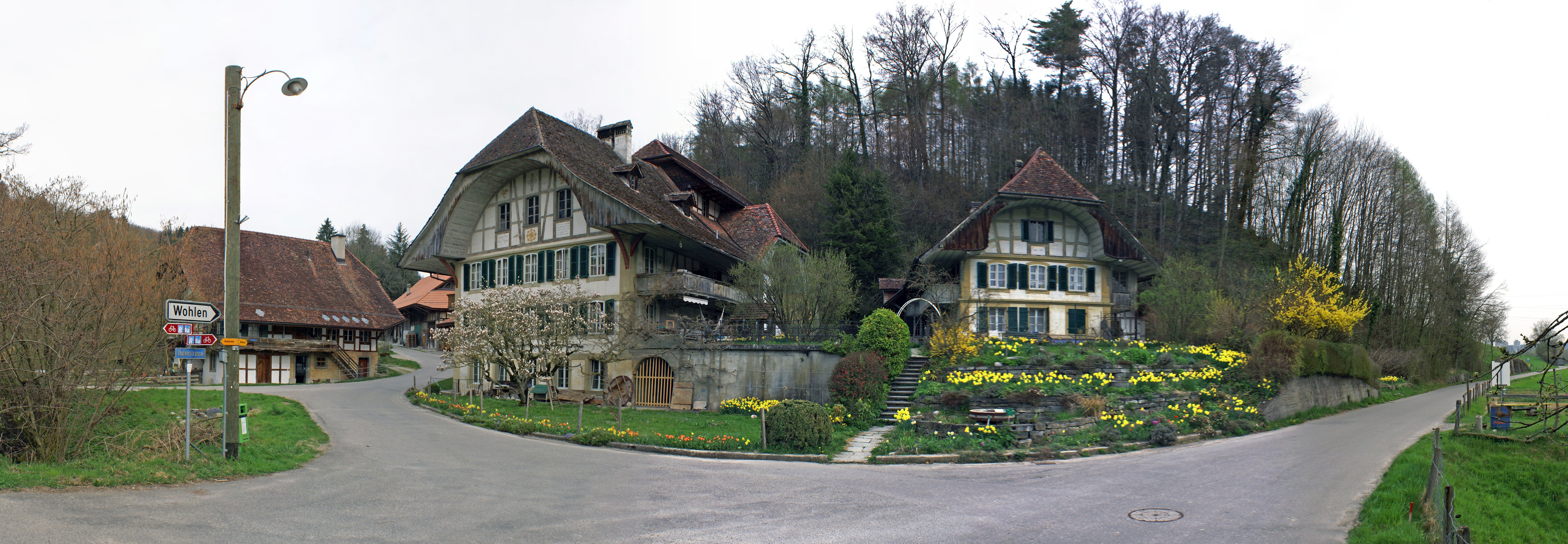
Hofenmühle

The Hofenmühle is listed as Swiss heritage site of national significance. The hamlets of Hofen, Illiswil, Möriswil and Oberdettigen are all part of the Inventory of Swiss Heritage Sites.

The Hofenmühle is an 18th-century water mill, which is located south of the main settlement, in the small Hofen hamlet.

== Politics ==
In the 2011 federal election the most popular party was the SPS which received 23.1% of the vote. The next three most popular parties were the SVP (22.7%), the BDP Party (15%) and the Green Party (13.4%). In the federal election, a total of 4,237 votes were cast, and the voter turnout was 61.4%.

In the 2019 federal election, SVP took over the Socialists in the National Council, by 23.1% of votes against 21.7%. The other parties scored as follows: GP 16.1%, glp 11.4%, FDP 11.2%, BDP 7.9%, EVP 2.1% and CVP 2.0%.

== Economy ==
As of 2011, Wohlen bei Bern had an unemployment rate of 1.55%. As of 2008, there were a total of 1,708 people employed in the municipality. Of these, there were 320 people employed in the primary economic sector and about 105 businesses involved in this sector. 350 people were employed in the secondary sector and there were 51 businesses in this sector. 1,038 people were employed in the tertiary sector, with 185 businesses in this sector.

In 2008 there were a total of 1,269 full-time equivalent jobs. The number of jobs in the primary sector was 199, all of which were in agriculture. The number of jobs in the secondary sector was 321 of which 102 or (31.8%) were in manufacturing and 217 (67.6%) were in construction. The number of jobs in the tertiary sector was 749. In the tertiary sector; 166 or 22.2% were in wholesale or retail sales or the repair of motor vehicles, 28 or 3.7% were in the movement and storage of goods, 58 or 7.7% were in a hotel or restaurant, 16 or 2.1% were in the information industry, 10 or 1.3% were the insurance or financial industry, 75 or 10.0% were technical professionals or scientists, 122 or 16.3% were in education and 138 or 18.4% were in health care.

In 2000, there were 618 workers who commuted into the municipality and 3,779 workers who commuted away. The municipality is a net exporter of workers, with about 6.1 workers leaving the municipality for every one entering. Of the working population, 35.9% used public transportation to get to work, and 44.1% used a private car.

== Religion ==
From the 2000 census, 1,363 or 15.2% were Roman Catholic, while 5,823 or 65.0% belonged to the Swiss Reformed Church. Of the rest of the population, there were 66 members of an Orthodox church (or about 0.74% of the population), there were 16 individuals (or about 0.18% of the population) who belonged to the Christian Catholic Church, and there were 468 individuals (or about 5.23% of the population) who belonged to another Christian church. There were 11 individuals (or about 0.12% of the population) who were Jewish, and 178 (or about 1.99% of the population) who were Islamic. There were 15 individuals who were Buddhist, 42 individuals who were Hindu and 7 individuals who belonged to another church. 941 (or about 10.51% of the population) belonged to no church, are agnostic or atheist, and 247 individuals (or about 2.76% of the population) did not answer the question.

== Education ==
In Wohlen bei Bern about 3,642 or (40.7%) of the population have completed non-mandatory upper secondary education, and 1,893 or (21.1%) have completed additional higher education (either university or a Fachhochschule). Of the 1,893 who completed tertiary schooling, 65.7% were Swiss men, 27.2% were Swiss women, 4.5% were non-Swiss men and 2.6% were non-Swiss women.

The Canton of Bern school system provides one year of non-obligatory Kindergarten, followed by six years of Primary school. This is followed by three years of obligatory lower Secondary school where the students are separated according to ability and aptitude. Following the lower Secondary students may attend additional schooling or they may enter an apprenticeship.

During the 2009-10 school year, there were a total of 956 students attending classes in Wohlen bei Bern. There were 9 kindergarten classes with a total of 143 students in the municipality. Of the kindergarten students, 8.4% were permanent or temporary residents of Switzerland (not citizens) and 19.6% have a different mother language than the classroom language. The municipality had 29 primary classes and 494 students. Of the primary students, 8.9% were permanent or temporary residents of Switzerland (not citizens) and 14.8% have a different mother language than the classroom language. During the same year, there were 19 lower secondary classes with a total of 319 students. There were 7.2% who were permanent or temporary residents of Switzerland (not citizens) and 10.7% have a different mother language than the classroom language.

As of 2000, there were 111 students in Wohlen bei Bern who came from another municipality, while 581 residents attended schools outside the municipality.

== Notable people ==
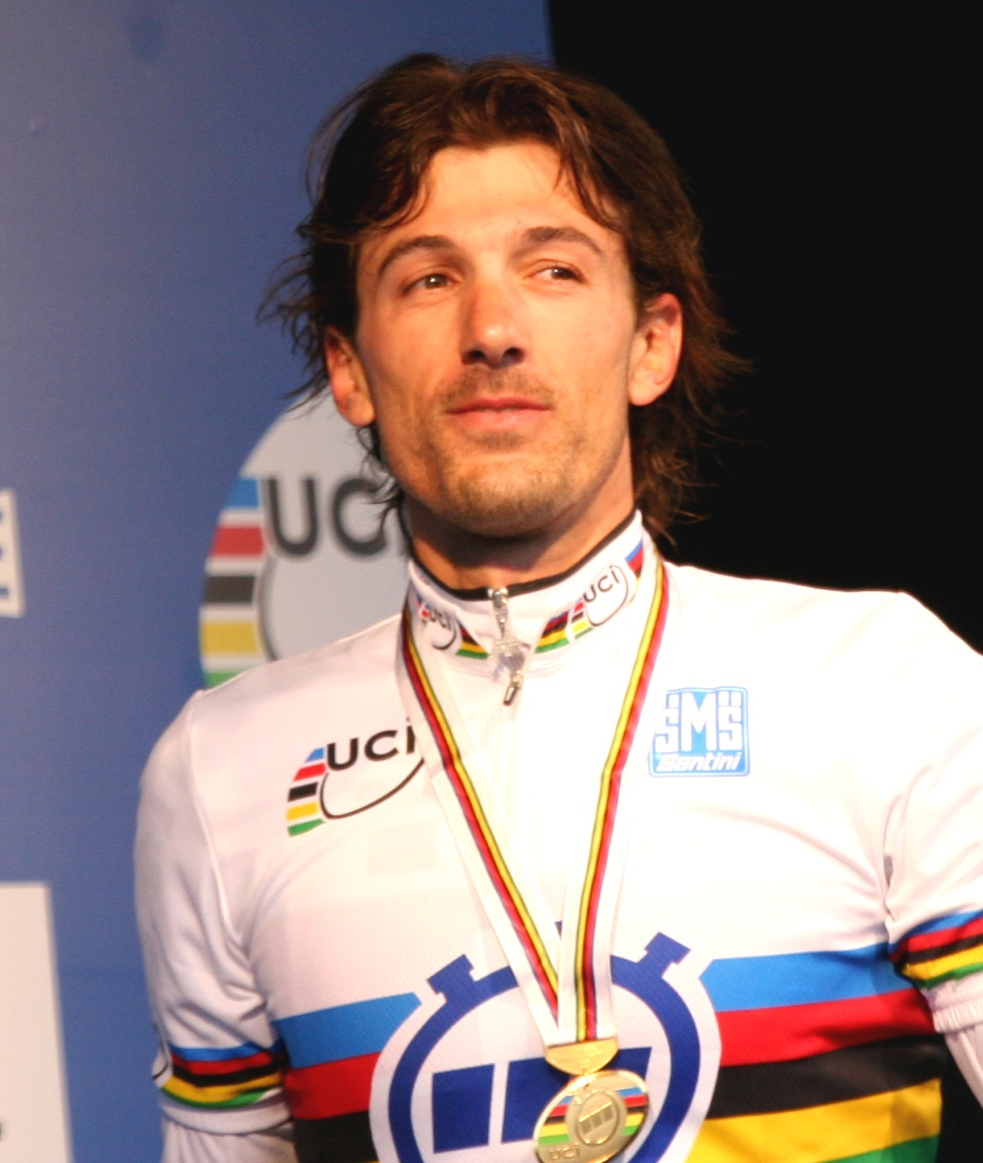
Fabian-Cancellara, 2010

- Fabian Cancellara (born 1981 in Wohlen bei Bern), a former professional road bicycle racer, gold medallist in the individual time trial event at the 2008 and in the 2016 Summer Olympics
- Leonardo Bertone (born 1994 in Wohlen bei Bern), a professional footballer for FC Cincinnati, formerly played for BSC Young Boys and Switzerland's youth national teams
- Daniela Gubler (born 1994), Swiss long jumper
- Daniel Koch (born 1955), a Swiss physician
- Ernst Hadorn (1902–1976), Swiss developmental biologist
