= Hofenmühle =

18th-century water mill in Switzerland

Coordinates: 46.9683°N 7.3509°E

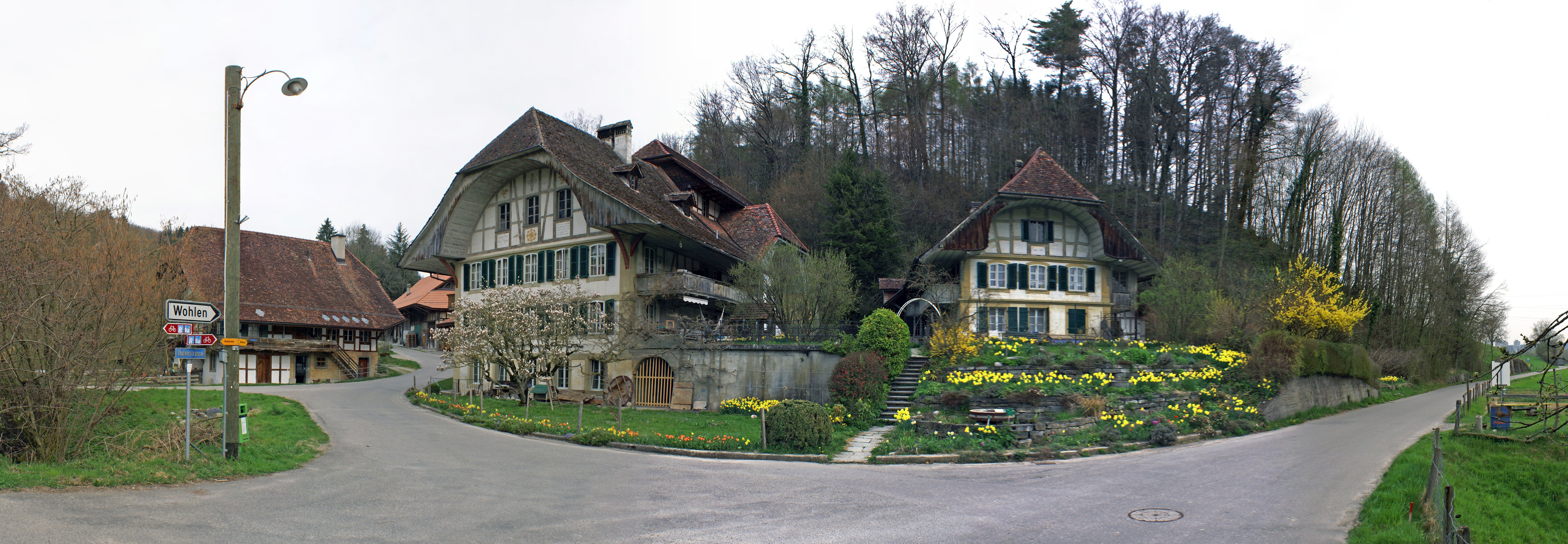
The Hofenmühle compound as seen from the South

The Hofenmühle is an 18th-century water mill in the municipality of Wohlen near Bern, Switzerland.

The existence of the mill, which is private property, is attested since 1719. After the 1920 damming of the River Aar that created the Wohlensee reservoir, the water wheel was replaced with a Brown, Boveri & Cie turbine. The mill ceased to operate in 1994 following the retirement of the miller; since then, local craftsmen and artists have settled in the buildings. In 2007 and 2008, a 20 kW micro hydro power plant was installed in it.

As the hamlet Hofen, the mill compound has been listed in the Inventory of Swiss Heritage Sites since 1943. It is also listed as a heritage site of national significance in the Swiss Inventory of Cultural Property of National and Regional Significance.
