= Grasburg Castle =

Ruined castle in Schwarzenburg, Switzerland

- Schloss Grasburg
- Schwarzenburg
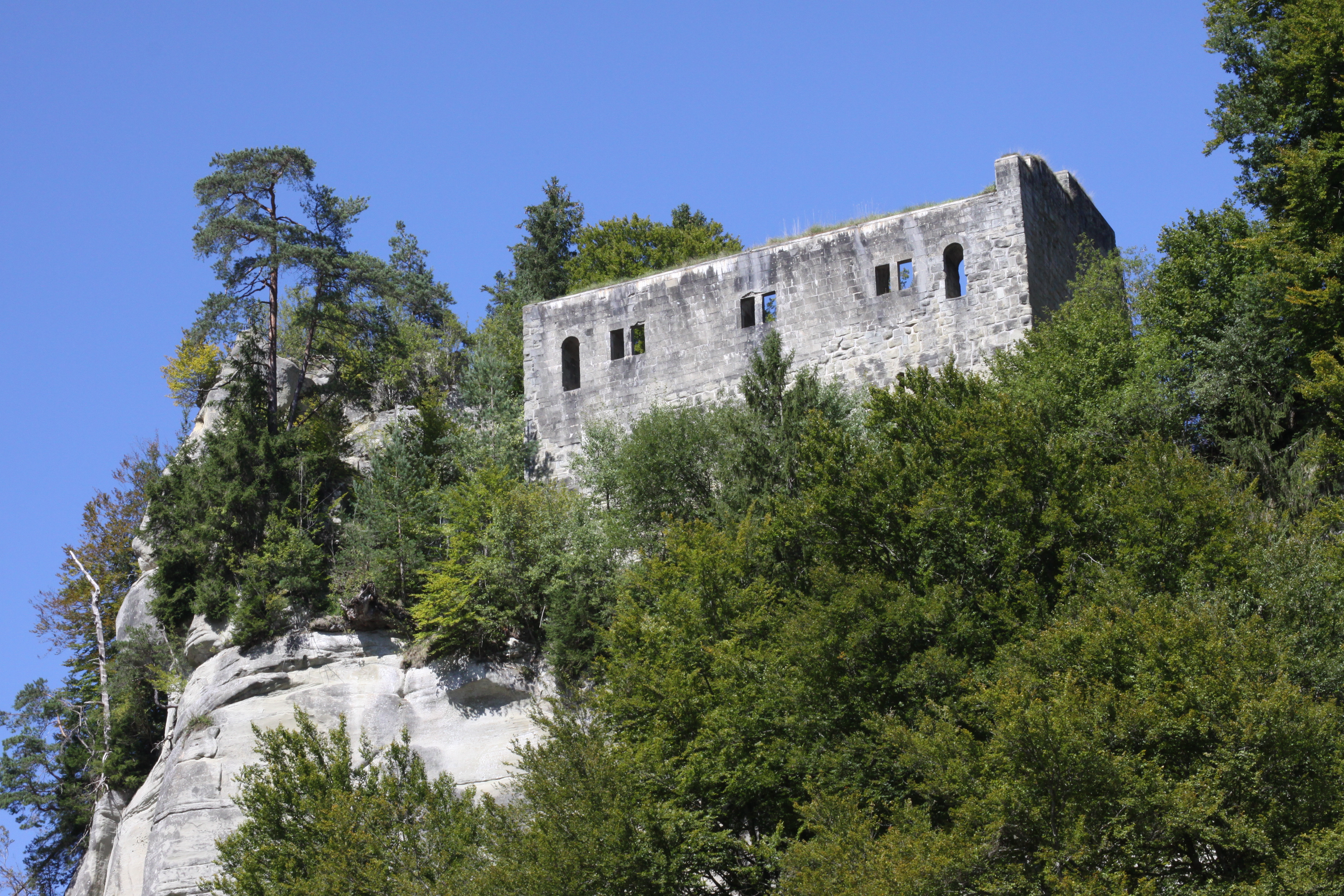
- Grasburg Castle

Site information
- Type: Castle Ruins
- Owner: Canton of Bern
- Open to the public: yes

Location
- Coordinates: 46.833823°N 7.331811°E

Site history
- Built: 11th-12th century
- Materials: stone

Grasburg Castle is a ruined castle in the municipality of Schwarzenburg of the Canton of Bern in Switzerland. It is the largest castle ruin in the Canton of Bern. It is a Swiss heritage site of national significance.

== History ==
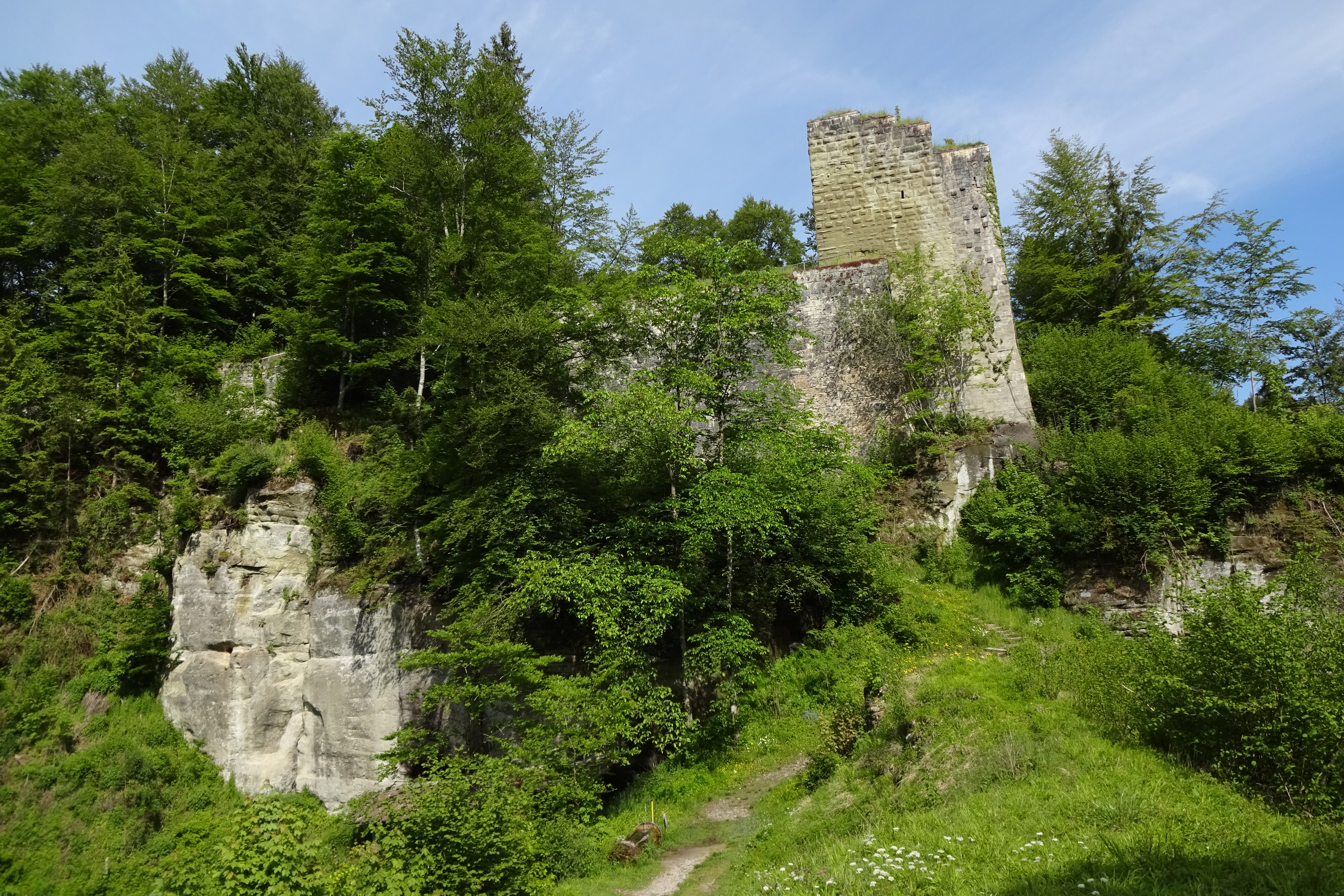
Grasburg castle ruins : front section

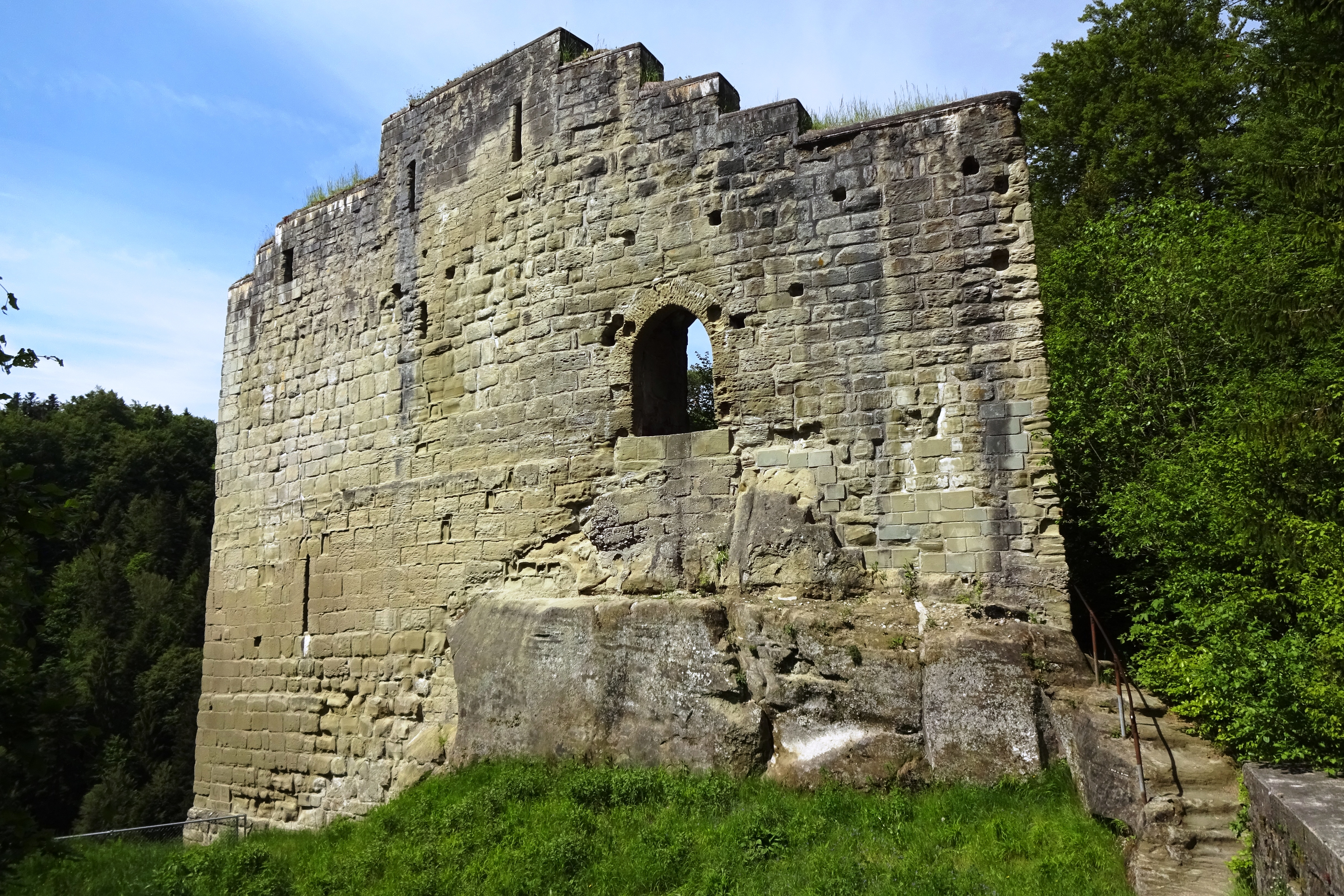
Grasburg castle ruins : rear section

According to legend, the first castle on the site was built by a Roman hunter who saw the massive sandstone spire on an island in the Sense river. He saw a red deer on the cliff over the river and went to catch it. As he rode after the deer a dragon roared out of a cave, but the hunter quickly killed the dragon. The deer then walked up to the hunter and offered his life to the hunter. The hunter allowed the deer to go free and the deer gave him in turn possession of the area. The hunter then built the first castle on the top of the sandstone spire on the island. A bridge was built over the river and became part of the Roman road from Aventicum. The legend continues that after the Roman Empire collapsed, a Walliser robber took over the old Roman castle as his new hideout. He began to hire local villagers to help him expand the castle toward eastwards. Initially, he acted friendly and kind, but when workers complained about their work or asked for pay, he murdered them and mixed their blood into the mortar. This, according to legend, is why the mortar on the east side is particularly hard. Whilst Romans did live in the area, there is no archeological evidence of a Roman or early medieval fortification.

Despite local legends, the first castle on the site may have been a wooden fortification. However, remains of the oldest stone walls are from the 11th or 12th century. It was probably built by a Burgundian or Zähringen nobleman. The castle was first mentioned in 1223 as Grasburc. In the same year, a knight, Otto von Grasburg was mentioned at the castle, followed in 1228 by the knight Kuno von Grasburg. In the 13th century the castle and its grounds passed to the Kyburgs and then after their family died out in 1263/64, the Habsburgs beat out the Counts of Savoy to inherit it. Under the Habsburgs, several Ministerialis (unfree knights in the service of a feudal overlord) families held the castle.

In 1310, Henry VII, the King of Germany, pledged the castle and surrounding Herrschaft to Count Amadeus of Savoy to pay debts. The Count and his descendants held the estate for over a century, until the remote location and gradual decay forced them to sell the castle and its grounds to Bern and Fribourg in 1423. The two cities established a condominium or shared rule over the land. The castle served as the residence and administrative centre for the vogts which were appointed by alternating the two cities alternately. In 1575, the increasingly expensive castle was abandoned and the vogt moved to Schwarzenburg Castle. The castle gradually fell into disrepair and in 1845 the Canton of Bern sold the ruins to a private owner. In 1894, the city of Bern bought the ruins and began with their restoration. By spring of 1902, the main tower was very close to collapsing. To prevent this from happening, the Canton spent four years repairing and reinforcing the tower. In another project from 1928-31, other parts of the ruins were repaired and restored. A further restoration project was undertaken from 1983-84.

== See also ==
- List of castles in Switzerland
