= Interlaken =

- Municipality
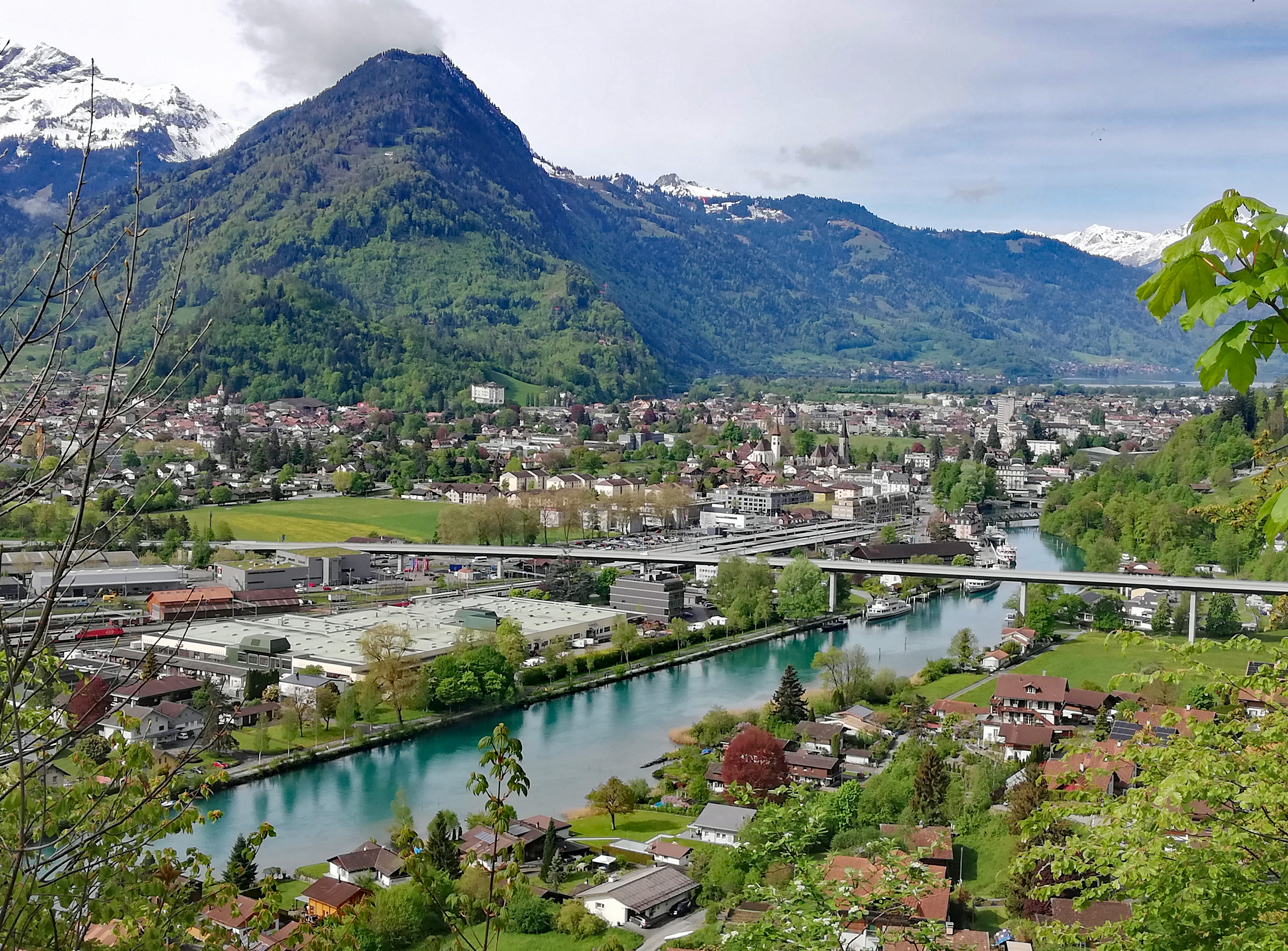
- Interlaken

- Flag Coat of arms
- Location of Interlaken
- Location within Switzerland Location within Canton of Bern
- Coordinates: 46°41′N 7°51′E
- Country: Switzerland
- Canton: Bern
- District: Interlaken-Oberhasli

Government
  - Executive: Gemeinderat with 7 members
  - Mayor: Gemeindepräsident(in); Philippe Ritschard FDP/PLR (as of 2026)
  - Parliament: Grosser Gemeinderat with 30 members

Area
  - Total: 4.27 km^{2} (1.65 sq mi)
- Elevation (Convent/Castle): 568 m (1,864 ft)

Population (December 2020)
  - Total: 5,719
  - Density: 1,340/km^{2} (3,470/sq mi)
- Demonym: German: Interlakner(in)
- Time zone: UTC+01:00 (CET)
  - Summer (DST): UTC+02:00 (CEST)
- Postal code: 3800
- SFOS number: 581
- ISO 3166 code: CH-BE
- Localities: Im Moos, Öli
- Surrounded by: Bönigen, Därligen, Matten bei Interlaken, Ringgenberg, Unterseen
- Twin towns: Scottsdale (USA), Ōtsu (Japan), Třeboň (Czech Republic)
- Website: https://www.interlaken-gemeinde.ch

Interlaken (Swiss Standard German: [ˈɪntərlaːkn̩]; lit.: between lakes) is a Swiss town and municipality in the Interlaken-Oberhasli administrative district in the canton of Bern. It is a tourist destination in the Bernese Oberland region of the Swiss Alps, and the main transport gateway to the mountains and lakes of that region.

The town is located on flat alluvial land called Bödeli between two lakes, Brienz to the east and Thun to the west, and alongside the river Aare, which flows between them. Transport routes to the east and west alongside the lakes are complemented by a route southwards into the near mountain resorts and high mountains, including the high Alpine peaks of Eiger, Mönch and Jungfrau, following the course of the Lütschine.

Interlaken is the central town of a small agglomeration with the same name of 23,300 inhabitants.

== History ==
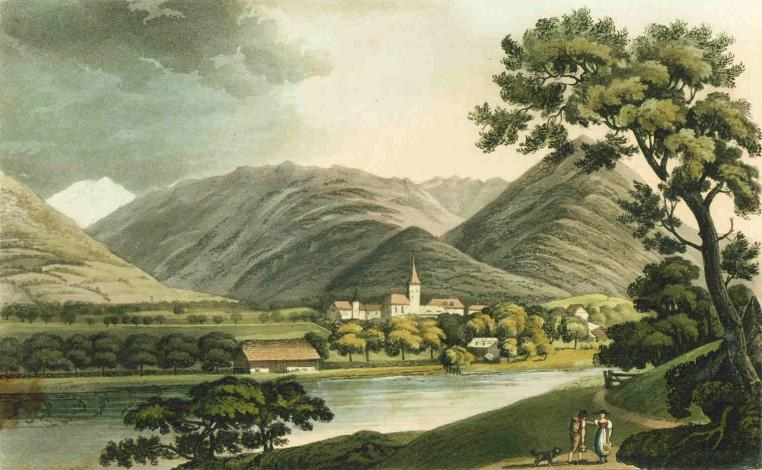
View of Interlaken, 1821

Until 1891, Interlaken was known as Aarmühle. The convent of the Augustinian Canons was built around 1133 when it was mentioned as inter lacus Madon and lasted until 1528. The mill on the left bank of the Aare was first mentioned in 1365 as Amuli, while the town on the right bank was mentioned in 1239 as villa Inderlappen.

=== Early history ===
While some scattered Neolithic flint objects, early Bronze Age swords and Roman era coins have been found near Interlaken, there is no evidence for a settlement in the area before the Middle Ages. Interlaken Monastery was built around 1133 on imperial land on the left side of the Aare. The monastery controlled a bridge over the river and generated an income from tolls. A village grew up around the monastery, along with a mill (which gave the municipality its name until 1891). On the right bank of the river, Interlaken village developed. In 1279/80 the village of Unterseen developed near Interlaken village. Also near the village were the imperial castle of Weissenau and the market town of Widen. The castle and market town became the possessions of the monastery, but fell into disrepair in the Late Middle Ages.

=== Interlaken Monastery ===
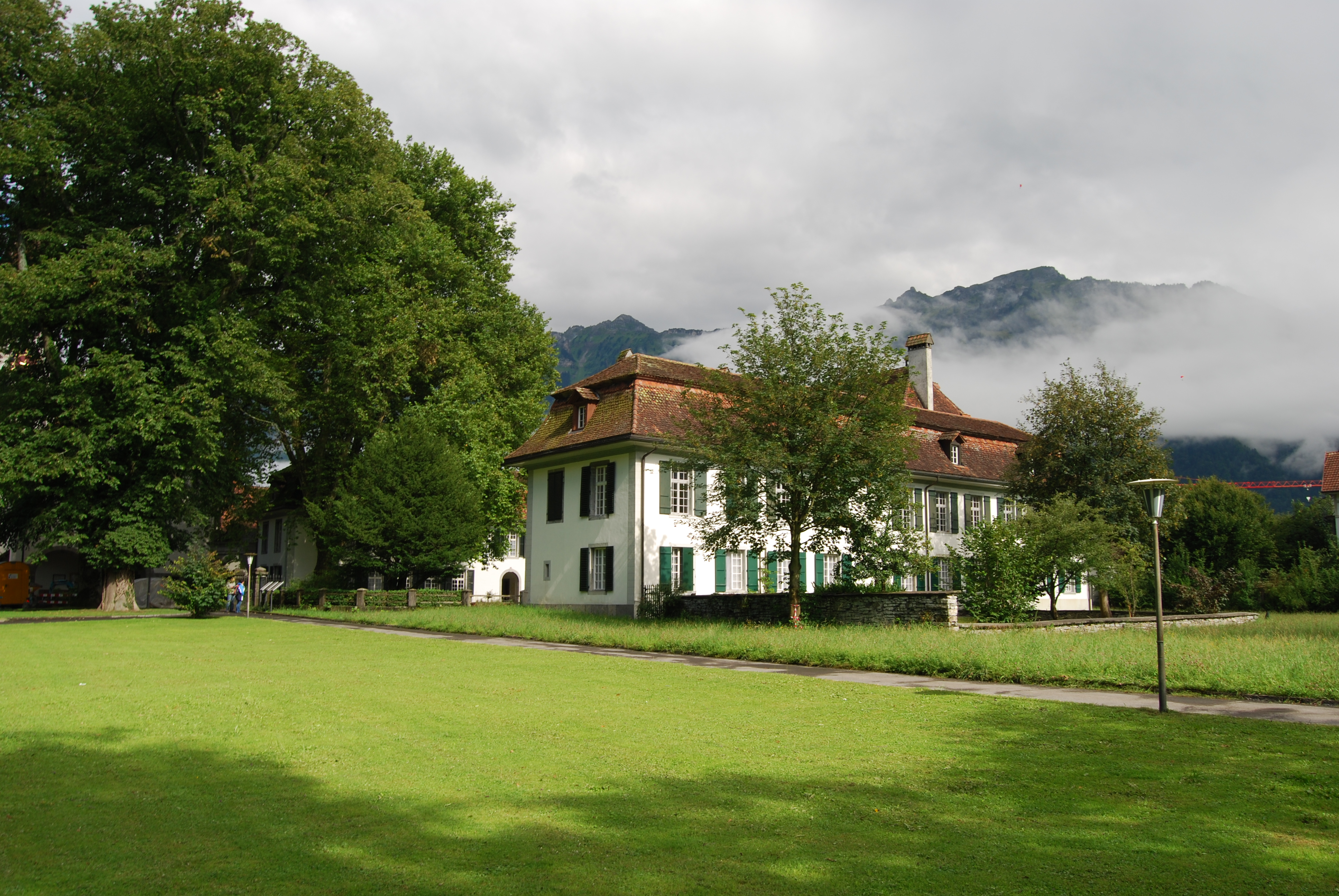
The New Castle was built in 1746–50 on the site of the monastery's west wing.

The Interlaken Monastery was first mentioned in 1133 when Lothair III, Holy Roman Emperor took it under his protection. By 1247, there were also women at the monastery. During the 13th century the monastery's influence spread throughout the neighboring area and into the Aare and Gürbe valleys. They eventually had authority over two dozen churches along with a number of villages and farms and became the largest religious landholder in the region.

During the 13th and the beginning of the 14th century, the monastery grew and prospered. However, in 1350 a period of crises and conflicts led to a decline in the number of monks and nuns and increasing debt. A document from 1310, indicates that there were 30 priests, 20 lay brothers, and 350 women at the monastery. In contrast, in 1472 there were only the provost, the prior, nine ordinary canons, seven novices and 27 nuns. At this time, the monastery also had problems with its tenants and neighbors. In 1348, the people of Grindelwald and Wilderswil joined a mutual defense league with Unterwalden. Bern responded with a military expedition to the Bernese Oberland, which ended in defeat for Unterwalden and its allies. In 1445 the Evil League (Böser Bund) rose up in the Oberland near Interlaken and fought against Bernese military service and taxes following the Old Zürich War.

During the 14th century, the canons and nuns stopped following most of the monastic rules. In 1472 a violent dispute between the men and the women's convents resulted in two visitations by the Bishop of Lausanne who noted serious deficiencies. The provost was arrested and some of the canons were replaced by canons from other convents. Despite the reform measures the nun's convent was closed in 1484 and its property transferred to the newly founded monastery of St. Vincent in Bern.

During the Protestant Reformation, the monastery was secularized in 1528. The canons received a financial settlement and the properties were now managed by a Bernese bailiff. The tenants of the monastery who had expected the abolition of allowed interest responded by rioting, which was suppressed by Bern.

After the Reformation, Bern created the Interlaken bailiwick from the monastery lands. Part of the monastery building was used as the headquarters of the district administration, while the rest was used as an indigent hospital. In 1562-63 Bern converted the monastery church's choir into a granary and a wine cellar. In 1746-50 the west wing was demolished and Governor Samuel Tillier built the so-called New Castle. It has remained the center of administration for the Interlaken District since that time.

=== Aarmühle village ===
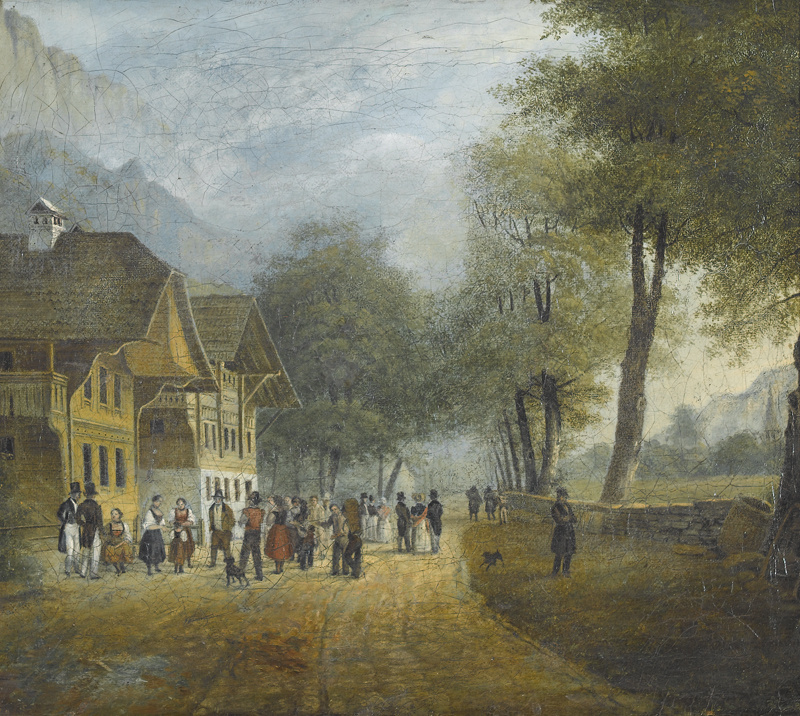
Höhenweg der Aarmühle nach Interlaken painting of Aarmühle by Jules-Louis-Frédéric Villeneuve from 1823

Aarmühle was named for the mill on the Aare which was built there in or before 1365. Starting in 1365, the monastery held weekly and yearly markets at Aarmühle. It had its own bäuert (agricultural cooperative) but was politically part of the municipality of Matten.

In the 16th century, the bäuert of Aarmühle and the surrounding bäuerten began quarreling over the use of common fields and woods. Attempts at arbitration in 1533, 1586, and 1618 were unsuccessful. Partly as a result of the quarreling, in 1633, Wilderswil separated from Matten and became an independent municipality. However, the dispute continued between Aarmühle and Matten, and in 1761, the governor of the Interlaken district attempted, unsuccessfully, to mediate. Finally, in 1810 the two villages divided their common property, though it took until 1838 for Aarmühle to become an independent political municipality.

Around the time of the separation, the number of tenant farmers (farmers that did not own the land that they worked) was very different in Aarmühle and Matten. In 1831, 37% of the population in Aarmühle were tenants, while only 12% were in Matten. This meant that the population of Matten was closely tied to the land and remained farmers, while in Aarmühle they began to support the growing tourism trade.

=== Aarmühle becomes Interlaken ===
On the right bank of the Aare, Unterseen became the only municipality and absorbed the village of Interlaken. In 1838, on the left bank, the villages became the two municipalities of Matten and Aarmühle. However, Aarmühle used the name Interlaken for its post office and train station, leading to that name becoming more well known. Officially the name changed to Interlaken in 1891.

=== Rise of tourism ===
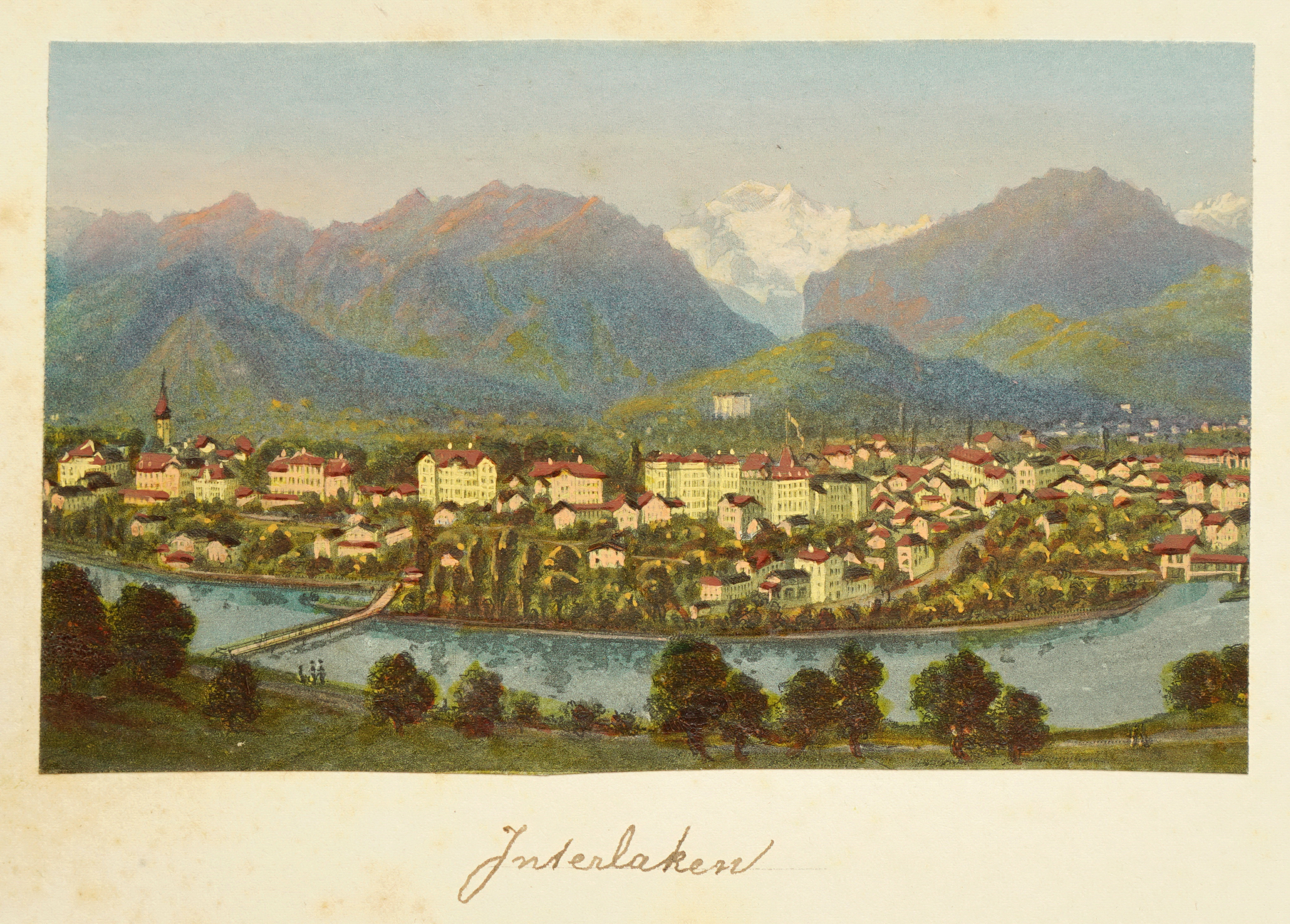
A flourishing resort: Interlaken c. 1875 (in the background: Jungfrau). Etching by Heinrich Müller

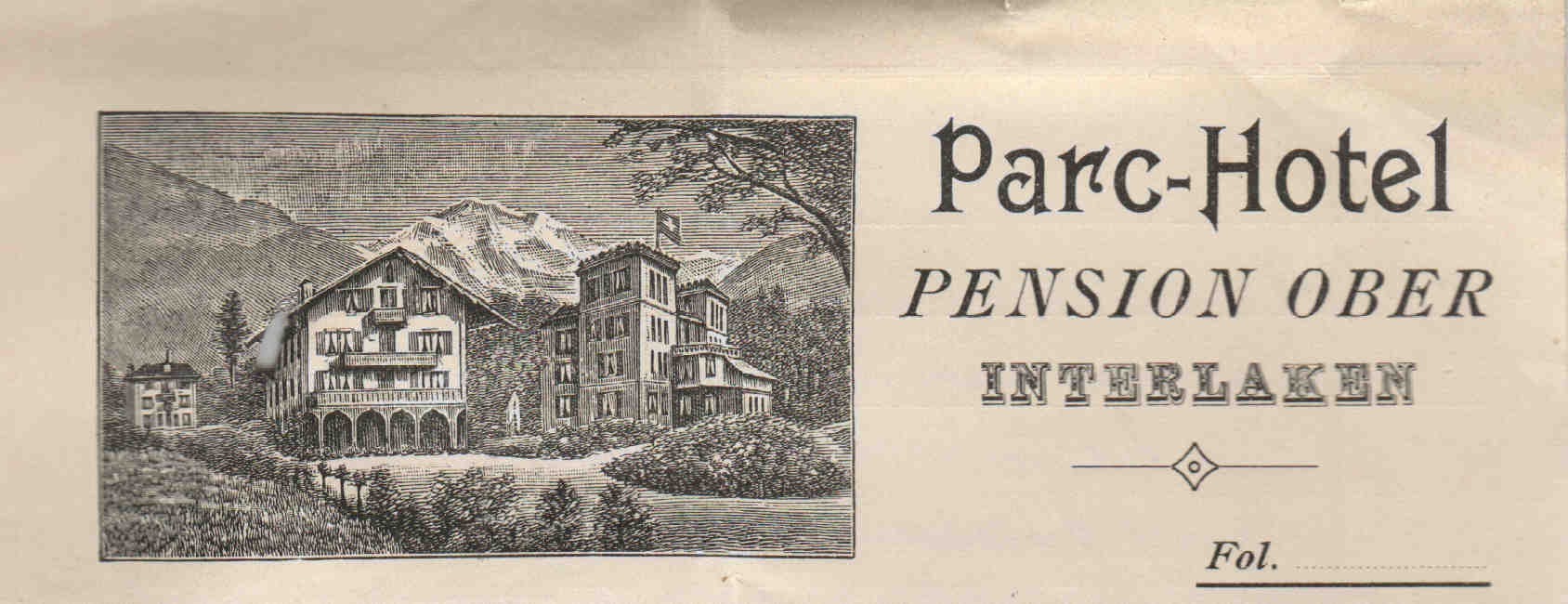
Parc-Hotel in Interlaken

Interlaken's reputation as international resort started around 1800 due to the landscapes of Franz Niklaus König and other Swiss landscape artists. The success of the Unspunnenfest, a festival of Swiss culture, in 1805 and 1808 brought many tourists to Interlaken. Starting in 1820, they came for mountain air and spa treatment and the large Kursaal opened in 1859 to provide an elegant spa. The many hotels combined with good transportation links made it easy for these early tourists to visit. In 1835 a steam ship route opened along Lake Thun from Thun, followed in 1839 by another along Lake Brienz from Brienz.

In 1872, the Bödelibahn railway opened from Därligen, on Lake Thun, to Interlaken. Two years later it was extended to Bönigen, on Lake Brienz. Initially, this line was unconnected to the rest of the Swiss railway system and served as a link between the steamships on both lakes. However, in 1893, the Lake Thun railway line opened alongside Lake Thun providing a direct rail connection to Thun, with onward connections to Bern and beyond. In 1888, the Brünig railway opened between Alpnachstad, on Lake Lucerne, and Brienz, on Lake Brienz, thus providing a through steamer and rail connection from Interlaken to Lucerne. By 1916, the Brünig railway had reached Interlaken from Brienz, and, together with an earlier extension at its eastern end, provided a direct rail route to Lucerne. In 1890, the Berner Oberland railway connected Interlaken to the tourist destinations of Lauterbrunnen and Grindelwald.

With the opening up of transport links, hotels developed along the route to the Jungfrau. In 1860–75 and 1890–1914 several luxury hotels were built with views of the Jungfrau and surrounding mountains. The current Kursaal was built in 1898-99 and remodeled in 1909–10.

Despite the emphasis on tourism, a parquet factory operated from 1850 until 1935 and a wool weaving factory opened in 1921. In the late 20th century a woolen thread and a metal products factory opened in Interlaken. Since 1988, Interlaken has been connected to the A8 motorway.

=== Modern Interlaken ===
The tourism industry's frantic growth abruptly ended in 1914 when World War I started, though it resumed somewhat after the war. World War II brought another dramatic slowdown. Interlaken started to recover from the effects of the war in 1955 as Interlaken re-branded itself as a convention and conference center. Today, the two nuclei villages (Aarmühle and the village around the Bailiff's Castle) have been joined by new construction between them. The municipalities of Matten and Unterseen are also connected by new construction to Interlaken and share a common infrastructure. A referendum to merge the three political municipalities into one was voted down in 1914 and again in 1927.

== Geography ==
Aerial view (1967)

=== Topography ===
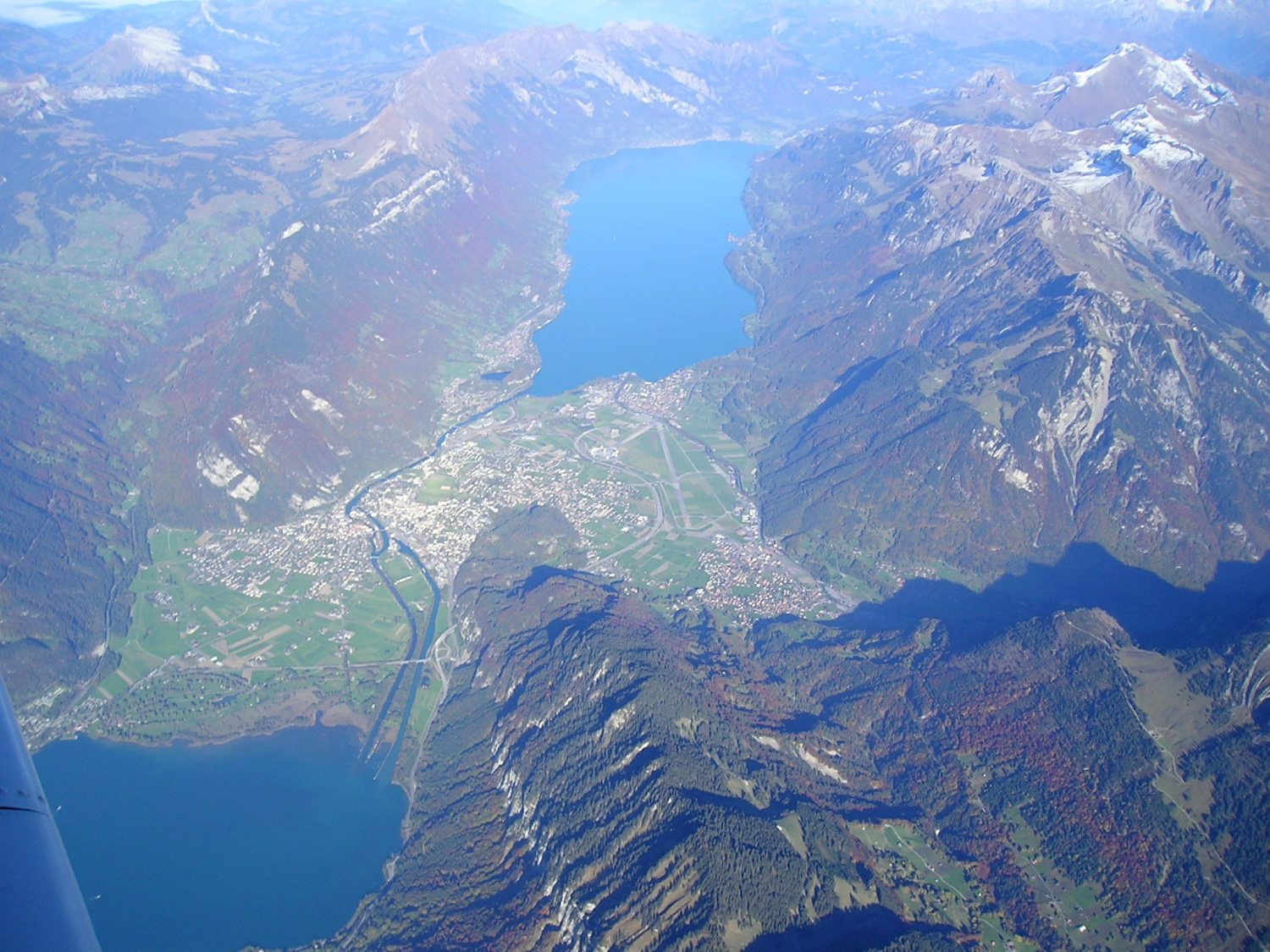
Aerial view of Interlaken (as seen from the west) located at the southern bank of the Aare (picture: on the left side), and Unterseen on the northern bank of the Aare, Matten b. I. south, right next to Interlaken, Bönigen right on Lake Brienz' end shore in the background, and Lake Thun in the foreground; the valley of the Lütschine is in shadow to the right with Wilderswil still in the sun.

Interlaken is located at 566 m (1,857 ft) above sea level, between Lake Brienz to the east and Lake Thun to the west on the alluvial land called Bödeli. The town takes its name from its geographical position between the lakes (in Latin inter lacus). The Aare flows through the town from one to the other lake, whilst the Lütschine flows from the mountains from the south into Lake Brienz however not running through the municipality of Interlaken.

The municipality of Interlaken has an area of 4.27 km^{2} (1.65 sq mi). Of this area, 1.05 km^{2} (0.41 mi^{2}) or 24.4% is used for agricultural purposes, while 0.97 km^{2} (0.37 mi^{2}) or 22.6% is forested. Of the rest of the land, 2.03 km^{2} (0.78 mi^{2}) or 47.2% is settled (buildings or roads), 0.3 km^{2} (0.12 mi^{2}) or 7.0% is either rivers or lakes and 0.01 km^{2} (2.5 acres) or 0.2% is unproductive land.

Of the built-up area, industrial buildings made up 5.3% of the total area while housing and buildings made up 21.4% and transportation infrastructure made up 16.0%. while parks, green belts, and sports fields made up 4.0%. Out of the forested land, 20.9% of the total land area is heavily forested and 1.6% is covered with orchards or small clusters of trees. Of the agricultural land, 6.5% is used for growing crops and 16.3% is pastures, while 1.6% is used for orchards or vine crops. All the water in the municipality is flowing water.

=== Climate ===
Interlaken has a rather mild warm summer humid continental climate (Köppen climate classification Dfb) when 0 °C (32.0 °F) isotherm is used. However, if −3 °C (26.6 °F) isotherm is used, then the climate is temperate oceanic (Köppen climate classification Cfb). The climate in this area has mild differences between highs and lows, and there is adequate rainfall year-round.

Climate data for Interlaken, elevation 577 m (1,893 ft), (1991–2020 normals, extremes 1983–present)
Month	Jan	Feb	Mar	Apr	May	Jun	Jul	Aug	Sep	Oct	Nov	Dec	Year
Record high °C (°F)	17.4 (63.3)	20.2 (68.4)	23.1 (73.6)	27.2 (81.0)	31.7 (89.1)	34.4 (93.9)	35.8 (96.4)	36.5 (97.7)	29.2 (84.6)	24.4 (75.9)	20.5 (68.9)	18.6 (65.5)	36.5 (97.7)
Mean daily maximum °C (°F)	3.2 (37.8)	5.4 (41.7)	10.5 (50.9)	14.7 (58.5)	18.7 (65.7)	22.4 (72.3)	24.3 (75.7)	23.7 (74.7)	19.2 (66.6)	14.1 (57.4)	7.8 (46.0)	3.7 (38.7)	14.0 (57.2)
Daily mean °C (°F)	0.0 (32.0)	1.0 (33.8)	5.2 (41.4)	9.2 (48.6)	13.3 (55.9)	16.9 (62.4)	18.6 (65.5)	18.1 (64.6)	14.1 (57.4)	9.6 (49.3)	4.2 (39.6)	0.8 (33.4)	9.3 (48.7)
Mean daily minimum °C (°F)	−2.8 (27.0)	−2.5 (27.5)	0.9 (33.6)	4.1 (39.4)	8.3 (46.9)	12.1 (53.8)	13.8 (56.8)	13.6 (56.5)	10.0 (50.0)	6.0 (42.8)	1.2 (34.2)	−1.8 (28.8)	5.2 (41.4)
Record low °C (°F)	−18.9 (−2.0)	−17.2 (1.0)	−13.2 (8.2)	−6.5 (20.3)	−0.4 (31.3)	0.0 (32.0)	4.9 (40.8)	4.5 (40.1)	2.1 (35.8)	−4.8 (23.4)	−11.8 (10.8)	−13.2 (8.2)	−18.9 (−2.0)
Average precipitation mm (inches)	71.6 (2.82)	66.6 (2.62)	72.7 (2.86)	82.5 (3.25)	122.0 (4.80)	126.9 (5.00)	145.8 (5.74)	145.8 (5.74)	93.9 (3.70)	79.9 (3.15)	79.9 (3.15)	90.8 (3.57)	1,178.4 (46.39)
Average snowfall cm (inches)	28.1 (11.1)	26.5 (10.4)	11.4 (4.5)	0.8 (0.3)	0.0 (0.0)	0.0 (0.0)	0.0 (0.0)	0.0 (0.0)	0.0 (0.0)	0.0 (0.0)	5.6 (2.2)	17.8 (7.0)	90.2 (35.5)
Average precipitation days (≥ 1.0 mm)	9.1	8.5	9.9	10.1	12.5	13.2	12.8	12.8	9.5	9.3	9.6	10.0	127.3
Average snowy days (≥ 1.0 cm)	4.6	4.7	3.1	0.4	0.0	0.0	0.0	0.0	0.0	0.0	1.1	3.2	17.1
Average relative humidity (%)	83	78	72	69	72	73	73	77	80	83	84	85	77
Mean monthly sunshine hours	66.7	82.4	128.5	163.7	182.8	199.9	222.9	199.1	152.0	102.4	67.8	56.5	1,624.7
Percentage possible sunshine	41	49	49	48	44	46	52	53	53	50	42	36	48
Source 1: NOAA
Source 2: MeteoSwiss (snow 1981–2010) Infoclimat (extremes)

== Politics ==
=== Coat of arms ===
The blazon of the municipal coat of arms is Argent a Semi Ibex rampant couped Sable langued Gules.

=== Government ===
The Municipal Council (Gemeinderat) constitutes the executive government of the municipality of interlaken and operates as a collegiate authority. It is composed of seven councillors (German: Gemeinderat/-rätin), each responsible for a portfolio (Ressort). The councillor of the executive portfolio acts as an executive president (Gemeindepräsident). In the mandate period (Legislatur) 2021–2024 the Municipal Council is presided by Gemeindepräsident Philippe Ritschard. Departmental tasks, coordination measures and implementation of laws decreed by the Grand Municipal Council are carried by the Municipal Council. The regular election of the Municipal Council by any inhabitant valid to vote is held every four years. Any Swiss resident of Interlaken allowed to vote can be elected as a member of the Municipal Council. The delegates are selected by means of a system of Proporz. The president is elected as such as well by public election by means of a system of Mayorz while the heads of the other portfolios are assigned by the collegiate.

As of June 2026, Interlaken's Municipal Council is made up of two members of the FDP (The Liberals) of whom one is also the mayor, two members of the SP (Social Democratic Party), and one member each of the SVP (Swiss People's Party), EVP (Evangelical People's Party) and (Green Party). The last regular election (Landsgemeinde) was held on 27 September and 1 November 2020. The voter turnout was 67%/49.4%.

The Municipal Council (Gemeinderat) of Interlaken
Municipal Councillor (Gemeinderat/-rätin)	Party	Portfolio (Ressort, since)	elected since
Philippe Ritschard (Note: President of municipality (Gemeindepräsident))	FDP	Executive portfolio (Präsidiales, 2021)	2020
Andreas Ritschard (Note: Vice-president of municipality (Vizegemeindepräsident))	SP	Education (Bildung, 2021)	2020
Zina Uberti	Grüne	Social Services (Soziales, 2024)	2024
Nathalie Günter	SP	Construction (Bau, 2024)	2024
Nils Fuchs	FDP	Security (Sicherheit, 2024)	2011
Erich Häsler	SVP	Finances and Taxes (Finanzen und Steuern, 2024)	2024
Sabrina Amacher	EVP	Civil Engineering (Tiefbau, 2024)	2024

=== Parliament ===
The Grosse Gemeinderat of Interlaken for the mandate period of 2021–2024
1. SP (19.4%)
2. GPS (6.50%)
3. GLP (16.1%)
4. EVP (6.50%)
5. FDP (22.6%)
6. SVP (22.6%)
7. EDU (3.20%)
8. Jupa (3.20%)

The Grand Municipal Council (Grosser Gemeinderat, GGR) holds legislative power. It is made up of 31 members, with elections held every four years. The Grand Municipal Council decrees regulations and by-laws that are executed by the Municipal Council and the administration. The delegates are selected by means of a system of Proporz.

The sessions of the Grand Municipal Council are public. Any resident of Interlaken allowed to vote can be elected as a member of the Grand Municipal Council. The parliament holds its meetings six to eight times per year in the Kunsthaus (art museum) at Amman-Hofer-Platz.

The last regular election of the Grand Municipal Council was held on 27 September 2020 for the mandate period (German: Legislatur) from 2021 to 2024. The voter turnout was 67%. Currently, the Grand Municipal Council consists of 7 members of The Liberals (FDP/PLR), 7 Swiss People's Party (SVP/UDC), 6 Social Democratic Party (SP/PS), 5 new members of the Green Liberal Party, 2 Green Party (GPS/PES), 2 Evangelical People's Party (EVP/PEV), and one member each of the EDU and the Jupa.

=== National elections ===
==== National Council ====
In the 2019 Swiss federal election for the Swiss National Council the most popular party was the SVP which received 26.1% (-4.6) of the votes. The next five most popular parties were the SP (19.9%, +1.3), the FDP (12.3%, +0.9), the Green Party (10.6%, +2.7), GLP (9.8%, +5.6), and the BDP (7.9%, –6.5). In the federal election, a total of 1463 voters were cast, and the voter turnout was 42.1%.

In the 2015 Swiss federal election for the Swiss National Council the most popular party was the SVP which received 30.7% of the votes. The next five most popular parties were the SP (18.6%), the BDP (14.3%), the FDP (11.4%), the Green Party (7.9%), and EVP (6.1%). In the federal election, a total of 1610 voters were cast, and the voter turnout was 45.5%.

=== International relations ===
==== Twin towns – sister cities ====
Interlaken is twinned with:

- Ōtsu, Japan
- Scottsdale, United States
- Třeboň, Czech Republic
- Huangshan, China
- Zeuthen, Germany

== Demographics ==
=== Population ===
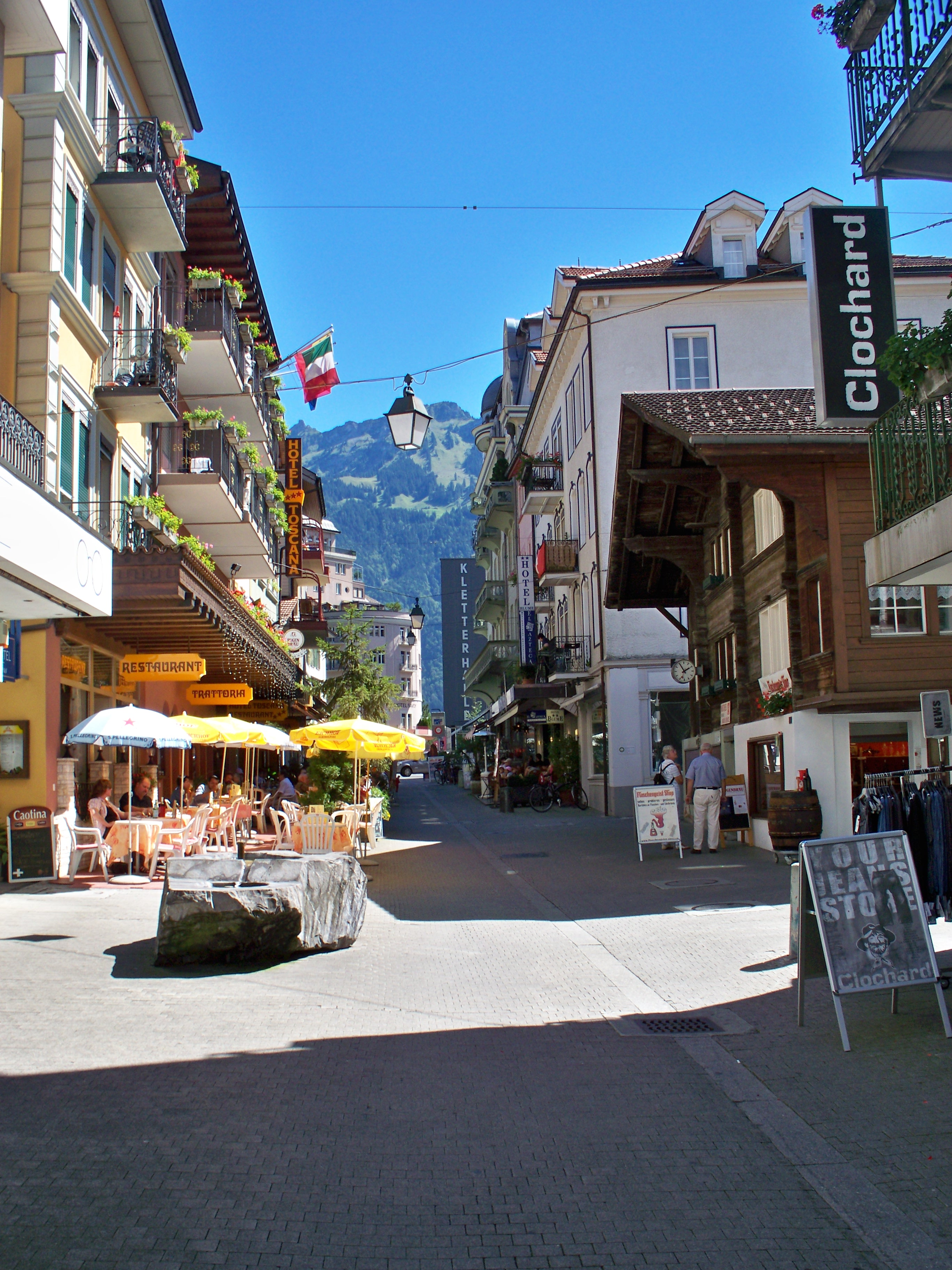
Jungfraustrasse

Interlaken has a population (as of December 2020) of 5,719. As of 2010, 26.4% of the population are resident foreign nationals. Over the last 10 years (2000–2010) the population has changed at a rate of 5.3%. Migration accounted for 8.2%, while births and deaths accounted for −1.9%.

Most of the population (as of 2000) speaks German (4,271 or 83.4%) as their first language, Portuguese is the second most common (198 or 3.9%) and Italian is the third (145 or 2.8%). There are 64 people who speak French and 11 people who speak Romansh.

As of 2008, the population was 47.5% male and 52.5% female. The population was made up of 1,830 Swiss men (33.7% of the population) and 751 (13.8%) non-Swiss men. There were 2,164 Swiss women (39.9%) and 684 (12.6%) non-Swiss women. Of the population in the municipality, 988 or about 19.3% were born in Interlaken and lived there in 2000. There were 1,923 or 37.6% who were born in the same canton, while 805 or 15.7% were born somewhere else in Switzerland, and 1,185 or 23.1% were born outside of Switzerland.

As of 2000, children and teenagers (0–19 years old) make up 19.3% of the population, while adults (20–64 years old) make up 63.1% and seniors (over 64 years old) make up 17.6%. In the same year, there were 2,158 people who were single and never married in the municipality. There were 2,288 married individuals, 367 widows or widowers and 306 individuals who are divorced.

As of 2000, there were 2,418 private households in the municipality, and an average of 2.0 persons per household. There were 1,041 households that consist of only one person and 74 households with five or more people. A total of 2,292 apartments (83.5% of the total) were permanently occupied, while 329 apartments (12.0%) were seasonally occupied and 125 apartments (4.6%) were empty. By 2009, the construction rate of new housing units was 4.6 new units per 1000 residents.

As of 2003 the average price to rent an average apartment in Interlaken was 1013.98 Swiss francs (CHF) per month (US$810, £460, €650 approx. exchange rate from 2003). The average rate for a one-room apartment was 642.58 CHF (US$510, £290, €410), a two-room apartment was about 741.20 CHF (US$590, £330, €470), a three-room apartment was about 945.28 CHF (US$760, £430, €600) and a six or more room apartment cost an average of 1648.96 CHF (US$1320, £740, €1060). The average apartment price in Interlaken was 90.9% of the national average of 1116 CHF. The vacancy rate for the municipality, in 2010, was 0.1%.

The historical population is given in the following chart:

=== Economy ===
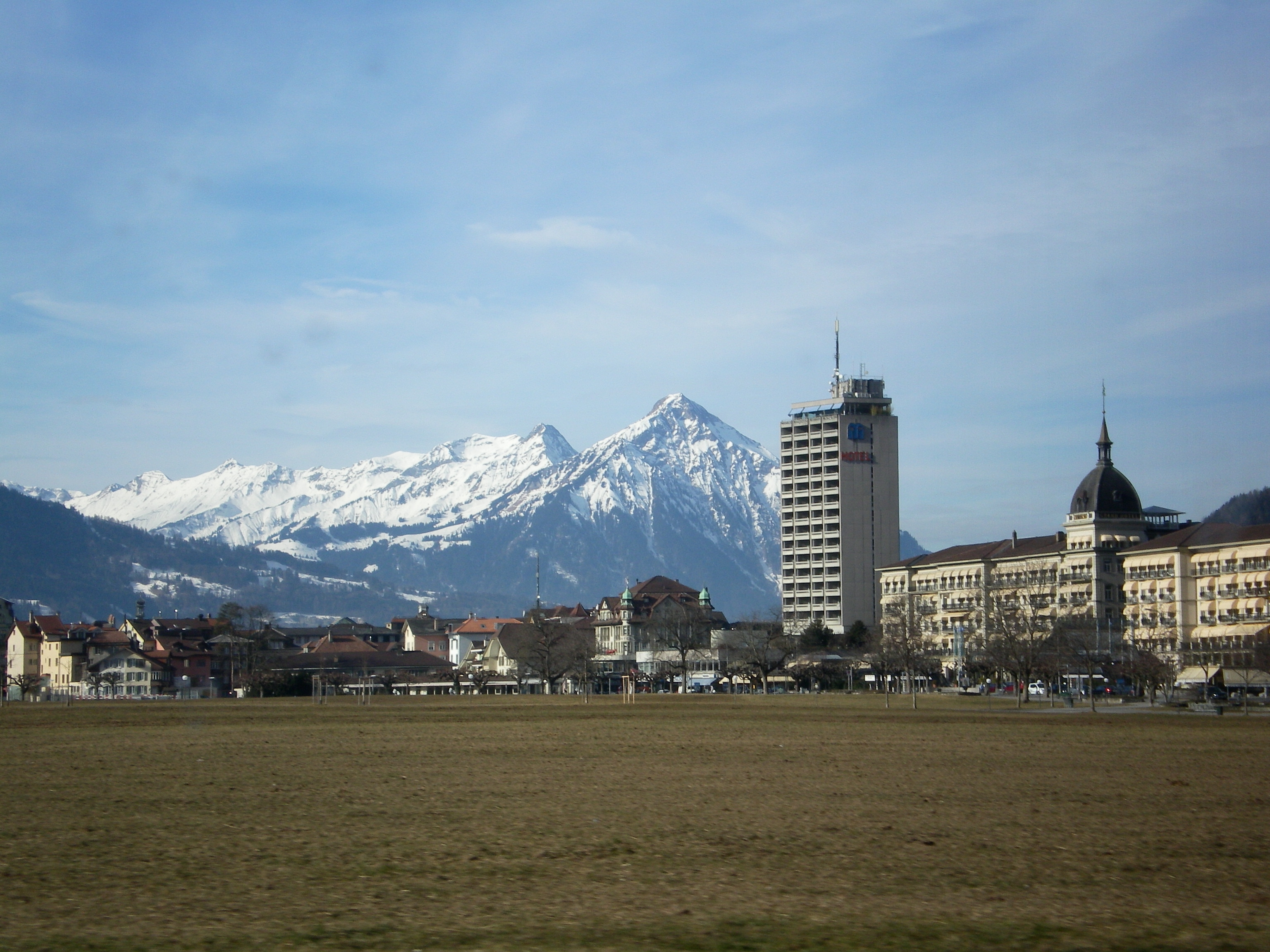
Hotels on the Höheweg; roughly a quarter of all jobs in Interlaken are in hotels or restaurants.

Interlaken is classed as a tourist community. The municipality is the center of the agglomeration of Interlaken. As of 2014, there were a total of 6,939 people employed in the municipality. Of these, 12 people worked in 5 businesses in the primary economic sector. The secondary sector employed 804 workers in 100 separate businesses. Finally, the tertiary sector provided 6,123 jobs in 724 businesses. In 2019 a total of 4.2% of the population received social assistance.

In 2011 the unemployment rate in the municipality was 3.4%.

In 2015 local hotels had a total of 710,116 overnight stays, of which 82.2% were international visitors. In 2017 there were about 27 hotels in the municipality, with 1,599 rooms.

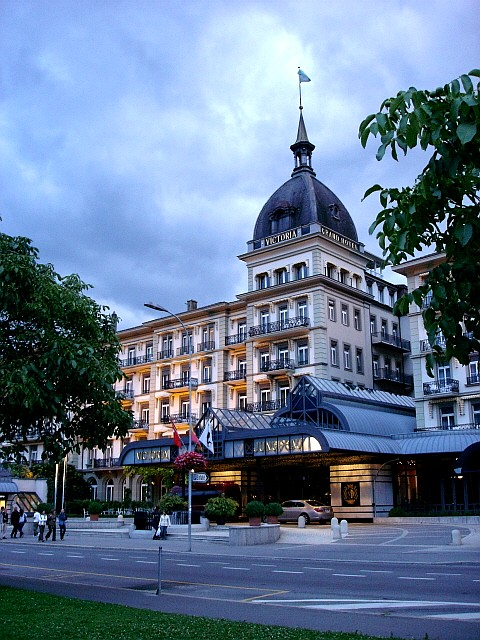
Hotel Victoria-Jungfrau

In 2008 the total number of full-time equivalent jobs was 4,903. The number of jobs in the primary sector was 4, all of which were in agriculture. The number of jobs in the secondary sector was 745 of which 281 or (37.7%) were in manufacturing and 397 (53.3%) were in construction. The number of jobs in the tertiary sector was 4,154. In the tertiary sector; 1,145 or 27.6% were in wholesale or retail sales or the repair of motor vehicles, 276 or 6.6% were in the movement and storage of goods, 1,170 or 28.2% were in a hotel or restaurant, 57 or 1.4% were in the information industry, 168 or 4.0% were the insurance or financial industry, 308 or 7.4% were technical professionals or scientists, 119 or 2.9% were in education and 360 or 8.7% were in health care.

In 2000, there were 4,253 workers who commuted into the municipality and 1,117 workers who commuted away. The municipality is a net importer of workers, with about 3.8 workers entering the municipality for every one leaving. Of the working population, 12.5% used public transportation to get to work, and 28.5% used a private car.

=== Religion ===
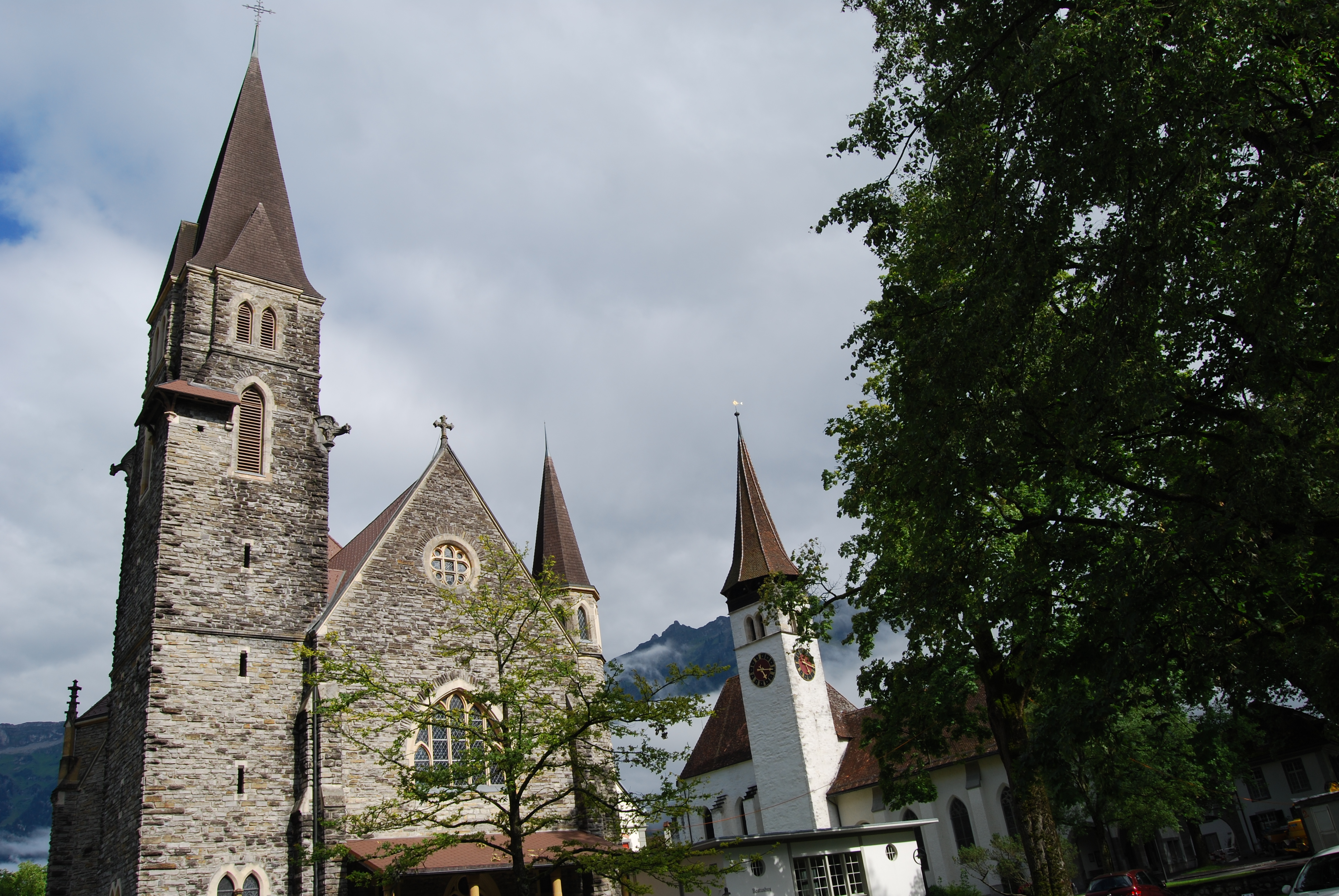
Catholic and Protestant churches

From the 2000 census, 1,139 or 22.3% were Roman Catholic, while 2,873 or 56.1% belonged to the Swiss Reformed Church. Of the rest of the population, there were 83 members of an Orthodox church (or about 1.62% of the population), there were 4 individuals (or about 0.08% of the population) who belonged to the Christian Catholic Church, and there were 374 individuals (or about 7.31% of the population) who belonged to another Christian church.

There were 3 individuals (or about 0.06% of the population) who were Jewish, and 170 (or about 3.32% of the population) who were Islamic. There were 29 individuals who were Buddhist, 43 individuals who were Hindu and 9 individuals who belonged to another church. 342 (or about 6.68% of the population) belonged to no church, are agnostic or atheist, and 235 individuals (or about 4.59% of the population) did not answer the question.

=== Education ===
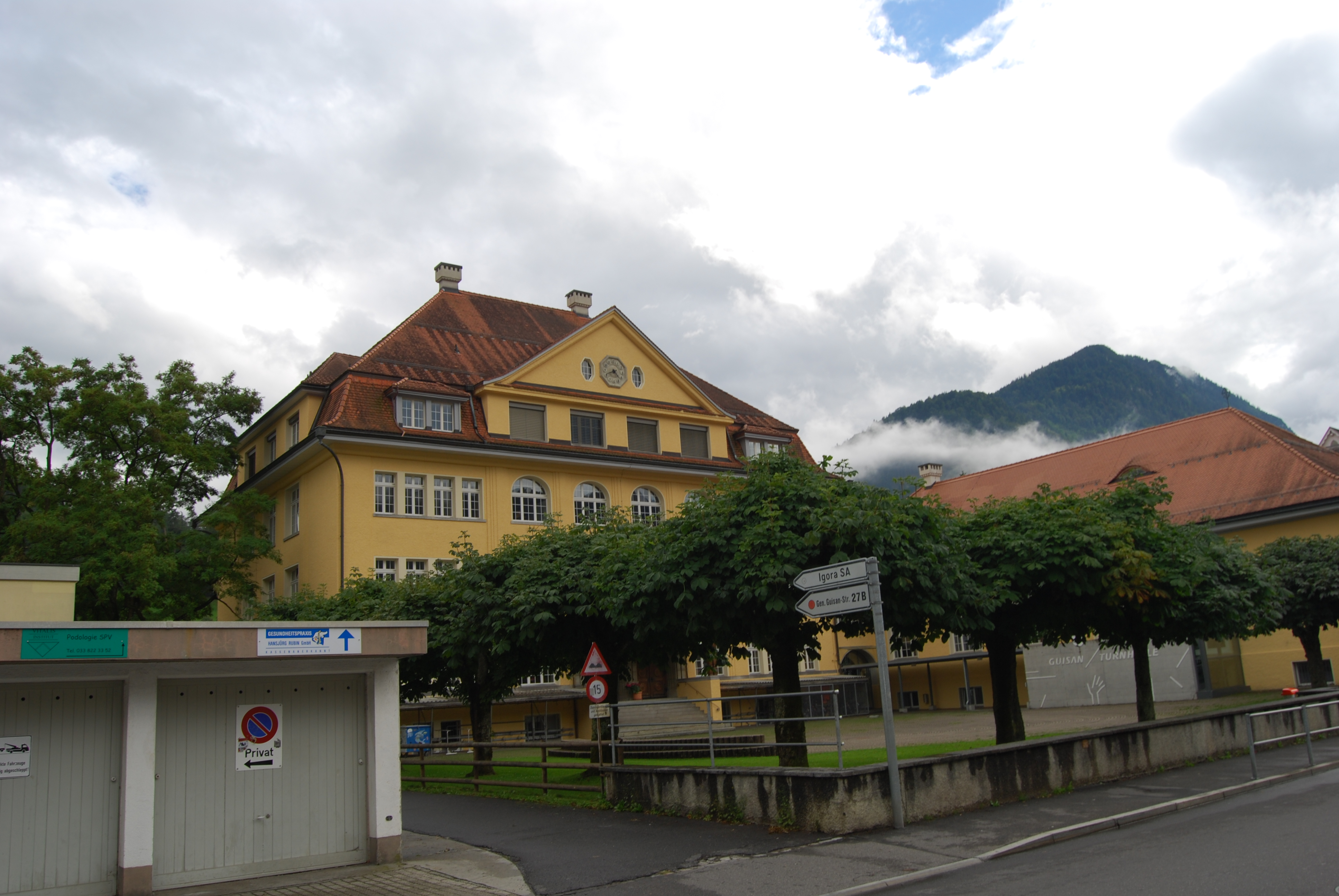
One of Interlaken's two primary schools

In Interlaken about 2,181 or (42.6%) of the population have completed non-mandatory upper secondary education, and 562 or (11.0%) have completed additional higher education (either university or a Fachhochschule). Of the 562 who completed tertiary schooling, 62.3% were Swiss men, 21.4% were Swiss women, 8.4% were non-Swiss men and 8.0% were non-Swiss women.

== Economy ==
=== Tourism ===
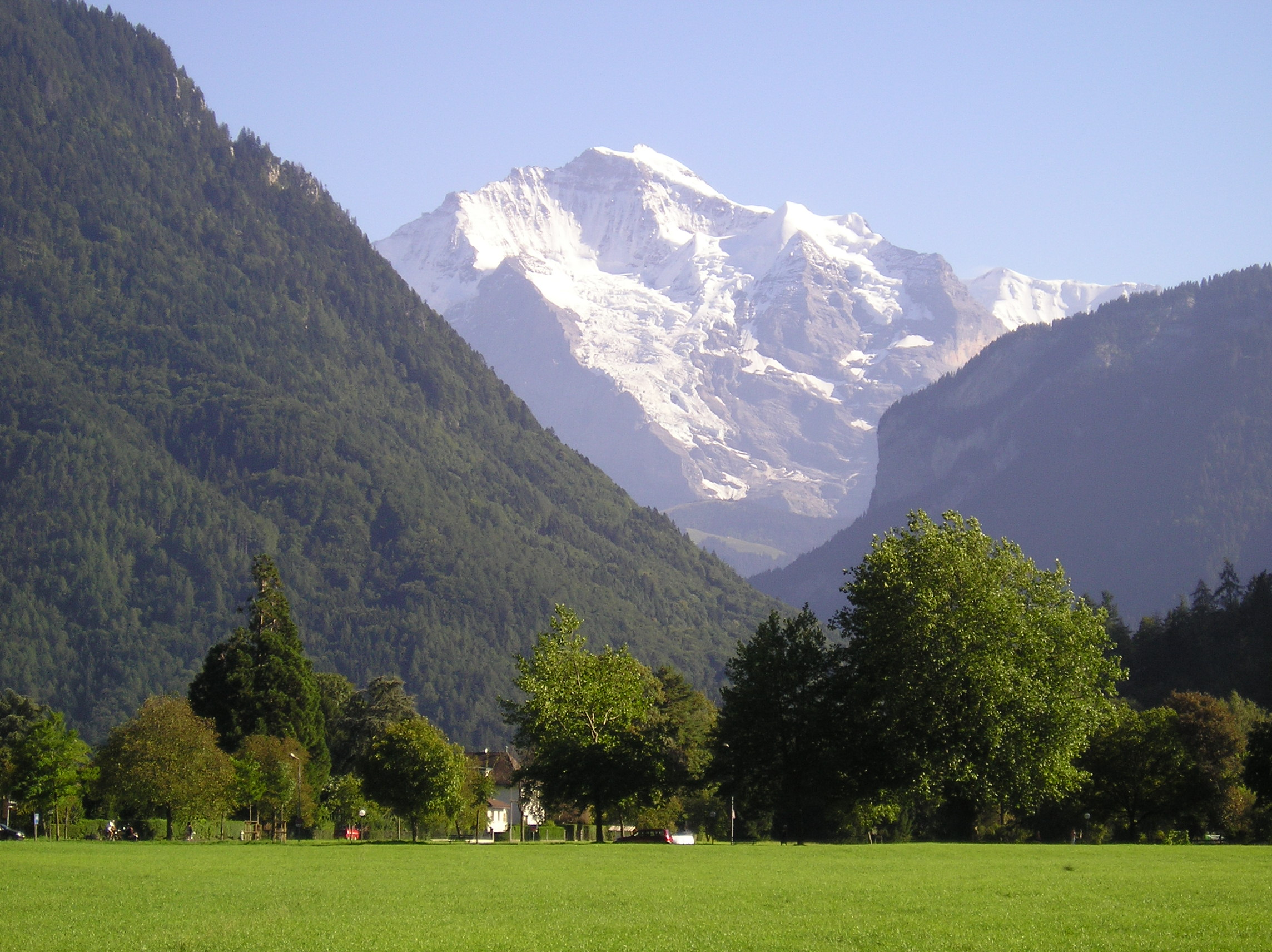
View of Jungfrau from the Höhematte

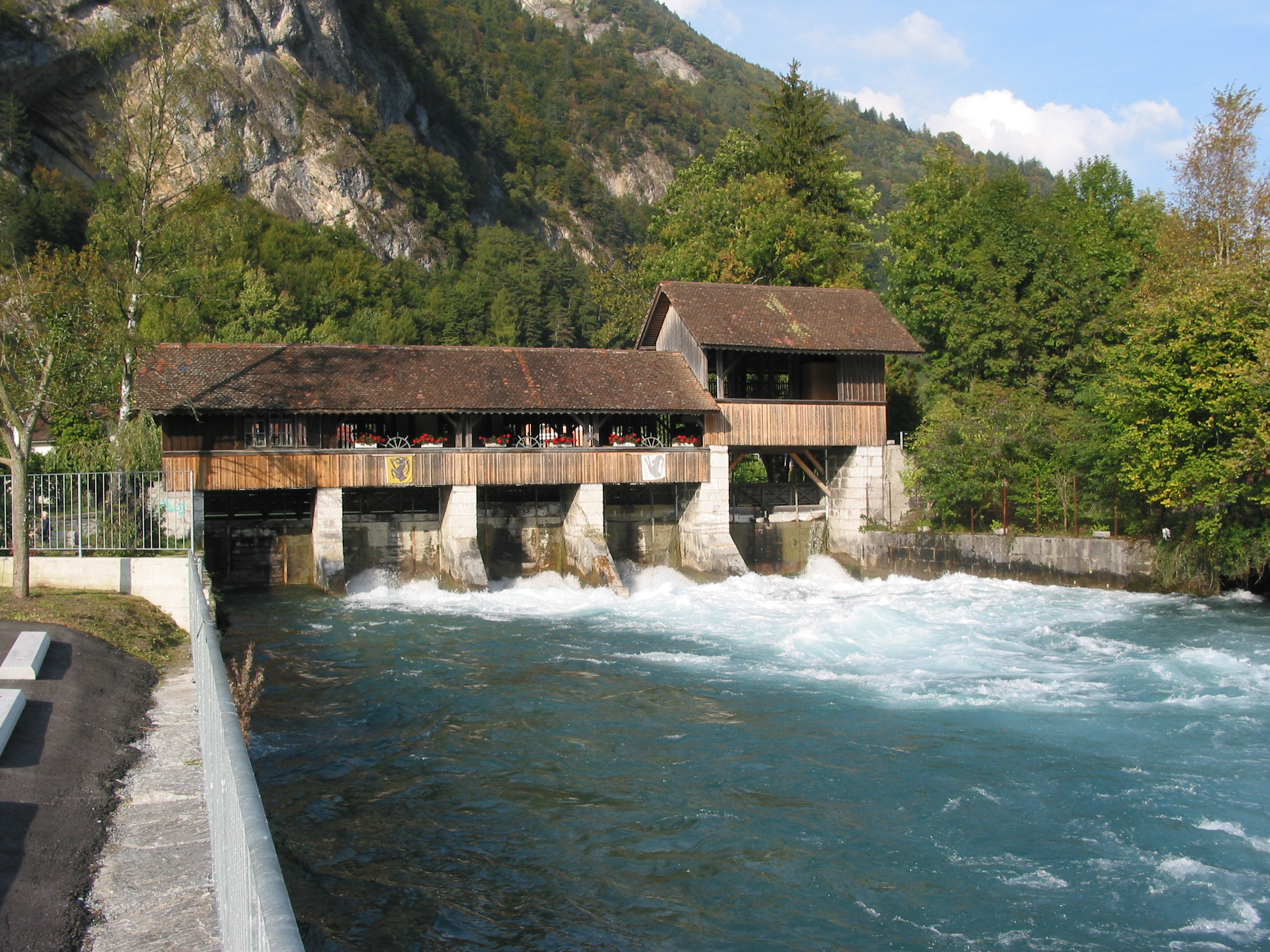
The weir on the Aare

The town is principally a base from which to explore the surrounding areas. Among the main attractions are the mountains of the Jungfrau region, including the Jungfrau, (4,158 m (13,642 ft)), the Mönch (4,107 m (13,474 ft)) and the Eiger (3,967 m (13,015 ft)). Whilst the peaks of these mountains are accessible only to mountaineers, a sequence of connecting mountain railways gives access to the Jungfraujoch, a saddle (3,454 m (11,332 ft)) between the Jungfrau and the Mönch, but correctly translated as a yoke (German: Joch), which is the highest point in Europe reachable by train.

Closer to Interlaken, the Harderkulm (1,321 m (4,334 ft)), just to the north of the town, and the Schynige Platte (1,967 m (6,453 ft)), just to the south, are also accessible by railway and provide extensive views of the higher mountains. Lake Thun and Lake Brienz are both close to the town, and the Aare flows east to west through the town. Boat trips operate on both lakes, serving various lakeside towns. One of these, Brienz, is the starting point for one of Switzerland's last remaining steam operated mountain railway, the Brienz Rothorn Railway.

Jungfrau Park, an amusement park, is situated just to the south of Interlaken. It was originally opened as a Mystery Park, a paranormal-based theme park owned by the author Erich von Däniken, but was closed in 2006 after three years because of financial difficulties. It re-opened in its current guise in 2009.

Interlaken has a large selection of hotels of various grades, many of which are located along the Höheweg, a street that links the town's two railway stations and offers views of the mountains. Other hotels are clustered around one or other of the two stations, or located across the river in the neighboring municipality of Unterseen.

Interlaken is also a destination for backpackers. It has numerous backpacker-friendly hotels and companies providing guided services in skydiving, canyoning, hang gliding, paragliding, and skiing.

== Education ==
The canton of Bern school system provides one year of non-obligatory Kindergarten, followed by six years of Primary school. This is followed by three years of obligatory lower Secondary school where the students are separated according to ability and aptitude. Following the lower Secondary students may attend additional schooling or they may enter an apprenticeship.

During the 2009–10 school year, there were a total of 667 students attending classes in Interlaken. There were 4 kindergarten classes with a total of 72 students in the municipality. Of the kindergarten students, 36.1% were permanent or temporary residents of Switzerland (not citizens) and 47.2% have a different mother language than the classroom language. The municipality had 15 primary classes and 275 students. Of the primary students, 33.8% were permanent or temporary residents of Switzerland (not citizens) and 43.1% have a different mother language than the classroom language. During the same year, there were 16 lower secondary classes with a total of 301 students. There were 17.6% who were permanent or temporary residents of Switzerland (not citizens) and 18.3% have a different mother language than the classroom language. As of 2000, there were 450 students in Interlaken who came from another municipality, while 78 residents attended schools outside the municipality.

Interlaken is home to the Bödeli-Bibliothek library. The library has (as of 2008) 22,043 books or other media, and loaned out 114,730 items in the same year. It was open a total of 292 days with an average of 21 hours per week during that year.

== Transportation ==
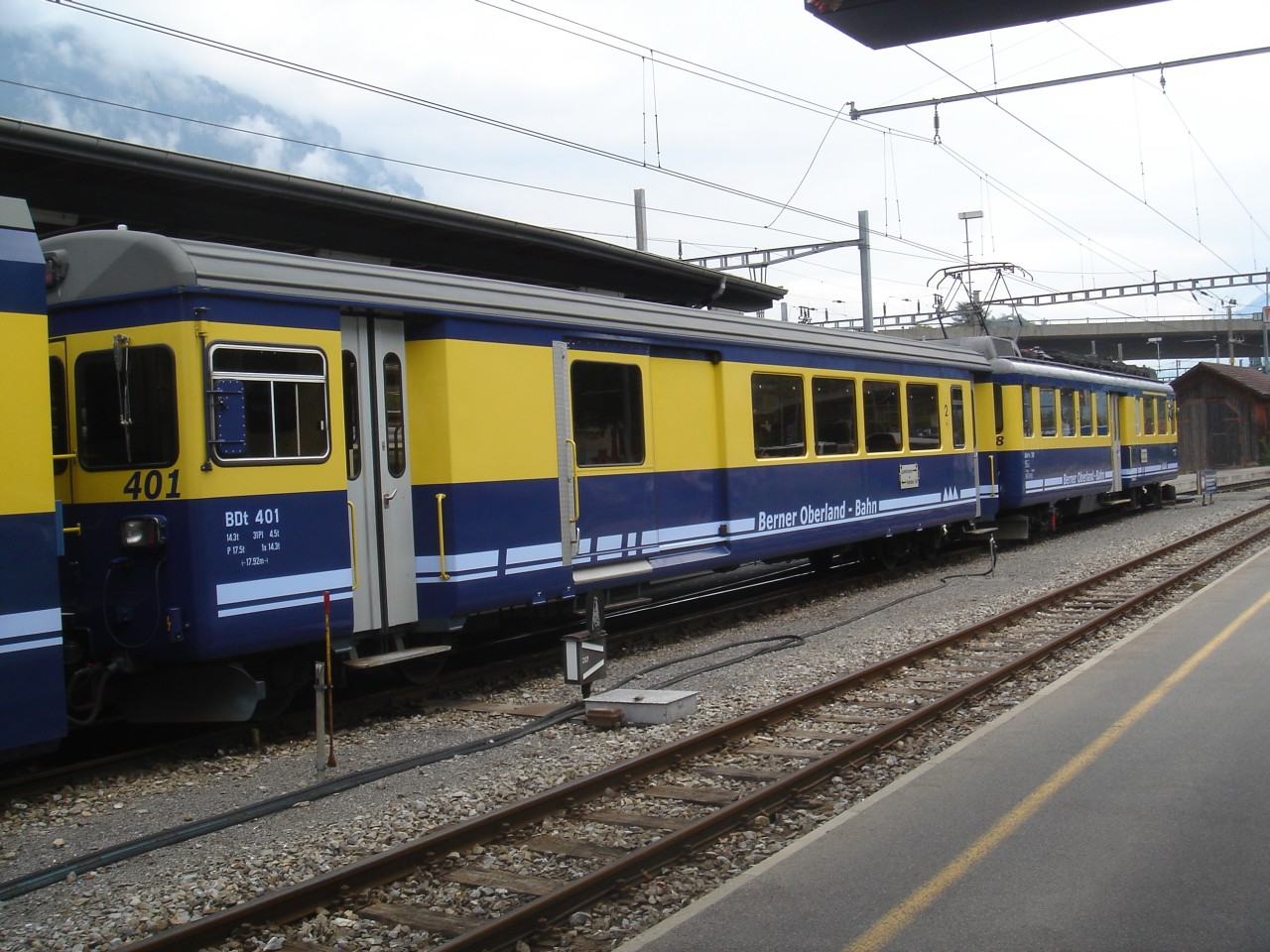
Berner Oberland train at Interlaken

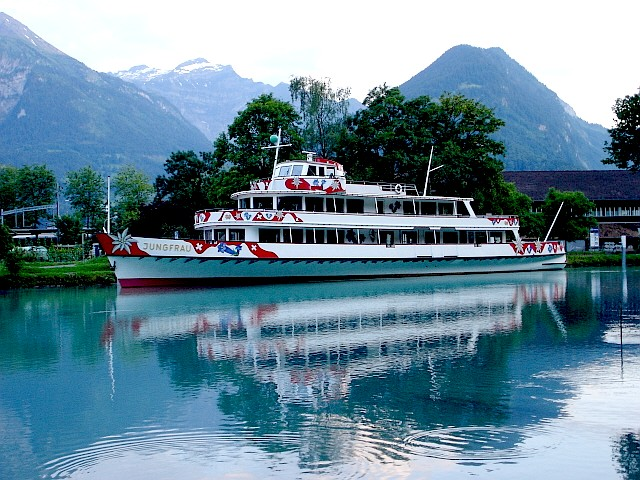
Lake Brienz ship Jungfrau at Interlaken

Interlaken has two railway stations, Interlaken Ost and Interlaken West, which are both served by the BLS AG's Thunersee line that provides direct services to Spiez, Thun, Bern and beyond, with onward connections at Bern to the rest of Switzerland. Moreover, international services are provided by TGV to Paris and ICE to Frankfurt and Berlin.

Besides being the terminal of the Thunersee line, Interlaken Ost is also the terminus of the Zentralbahn's Brünig line to Brienz, Meiringen and Luzern, with onward connections to north-eastern Switzerland. The Berner Oberland railway also operates from Ost station, providing the first stage of several mountain railway routes into the Jungfrau region and, most notably, to Europe's highest station at the Jungfraujoch.

Boat services across Lake Brienz to Brienz and across Lake Thun to Spiez and Thun are operated by the BLS AG. The boats on Lake Thun operate from a quay adjacent to the West station, connected to Lake Thun by the Interlaken ship canal. The boats on Lake Brienz operate from a quay on the Aare by the Ost station. The remainder of the Aare between the two lakes is controlled by several weirs and is not navigable.

Interlaken is connected by the A8 motorway to Thun and Lucerne, with onward connections by other Swiss motorways to the rest of Switzerland. Local roads also follow both banks of the lakes to east and west and follow the valley of the Lütschine south into the Jungfrau region. However, there is no direct road connection across the mountains of that region into the canton of Valais to the south, with the nearest such connections being the Grimsel Pass to the east, or using the vehicle transport service through the Lötschberg rail tunnel to the west.

In the more immediate area, two funicular railways, the Harderbahn and the Heimwehfluhbahn, provide service to nearby vantage points. Local and regional bus services are provided by PostBus Switzerland, whilst Verkehrsbetriebe STI operates a regional bus service to Thun.

== Culture ==
=== Events ===
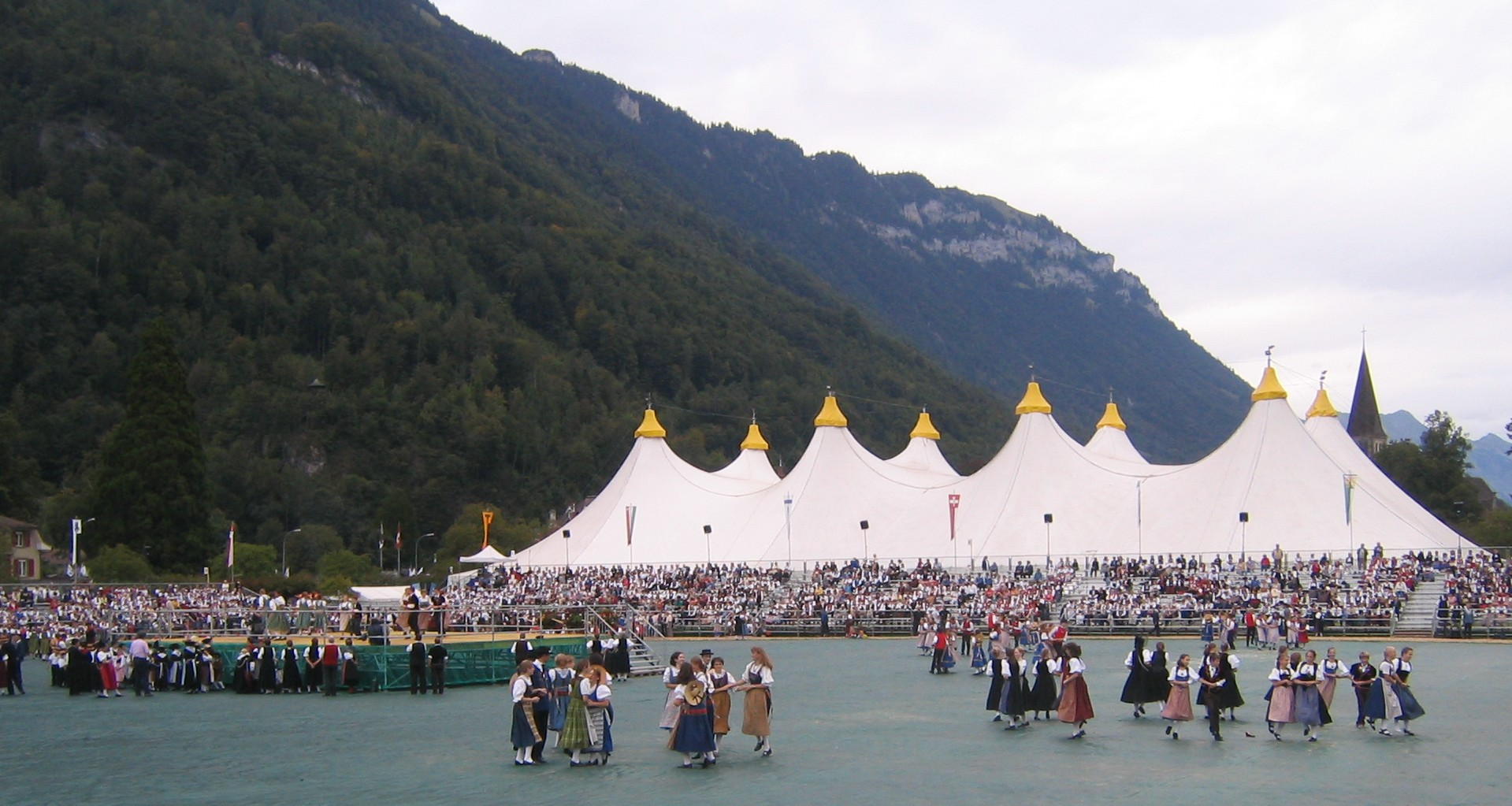
Unspunnenfest in 2006

- The Jungfrau Marathon is held in Interlaken each September.
- The Unspunnenfest is a festival held in Interlaken and the neighbouring communities of Matten and Wilderswil approximately every twelve years. The festival highlights traditional Swiss culture and features competitions of Steinstossen (stone put), Schwingen (wrestling) and yodelling. The last Unspunnenfest was held in 2017. The next celebration is scheduled for the year 2029.
- During summer, there is the Greenfield Festival on the outskirts of Interlaken.
- On 15 July 2007, the Red Bull Air Race World Series was held on the airport situated near Interlaken.
- From 27 August 1968 to 1 September 1968, World Constitutional Convention was held at Theatre Hall of the Kursaal in Interlaken.

=== Heritage sites of national significance ===
The former Monastery Building, the Hotel Royal-St. Georges, the Hotel Victoria-Jungfrau and the Kursaal are listed as Swiss heritage site of national significance. The entire urbanized village of Interlaken is part of the Inventory of Swiss Heritage Sites.

== Notable people ==
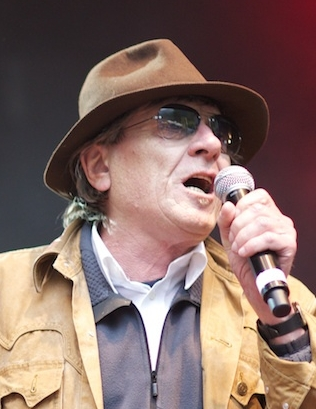
Polo Hofer, 2011

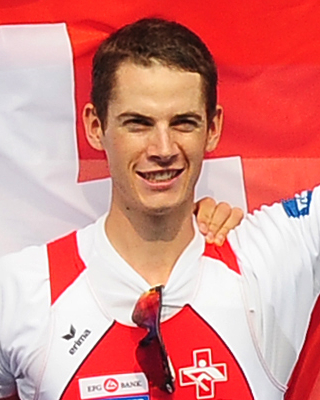
Lucas Tramèr, 2013

- Marie Fillunger (1850–1930 in Interlaken), an Austrian singer, lived in Interlaken from 1919
- Georgia Engelhard (1906–1985 in Interlaken), an American mountaineer, painter and photographer; lived in Interlaken
- Hans Schaffner (1908 in Interlaken–2004), politician and former Federal Councillor
- Dölf Reist (1921–2000), photographer and alpinist
- Adrian Frutiger (1928–2015), typographer, served his apprenticeship in Interlaken
- Elisabeth Glauser (born 1943 in Interlaken), a Swiss operatic mezzo-soprano and an academic teacher of voice
- Polo Hofer (1945 in Interlaken – 2017), rock musician

Sport

- Walter Balmer (1948–2010 in Interlaken), a Swiss international footballer
- Suzanne Müller (born 1963 in Interlaken), a Swiss rhythmic gymnast, competed in the 1984 Summer Olympics
- Sandra Dombrowski (born 1967 in Interlaken), a Swiss ice hockey player and referee
- Nelson Ferreira (born 1982 in Interlaken), a Swiss and Portuguese footballer
- Marcel Marti (born 1983 in Interlaken), a Swiss ski mountaineer
- Sven Michel (born 1988), a Swiss curler from Interlaken
- Kilian Moser (born 1988), racing cyclist
- Sascha Stulz (born 1988 in Interlaken), a Swiss professional football goalkeeper
- Lucas Tramèr (born 1989 in Interlaken), a Swiss rower, gold medallist at the 2016 Summer Olympics
