= Weissenau =

Weissenau may refer to:

- Weissenau Abbey, a historical abbey near Ravensburg, Germany
- Weissenau Castle, a ruined castle in the Canton of Bern, Switzerland
