= Thomas Straubhaar =

Swiss economist and migration researcher

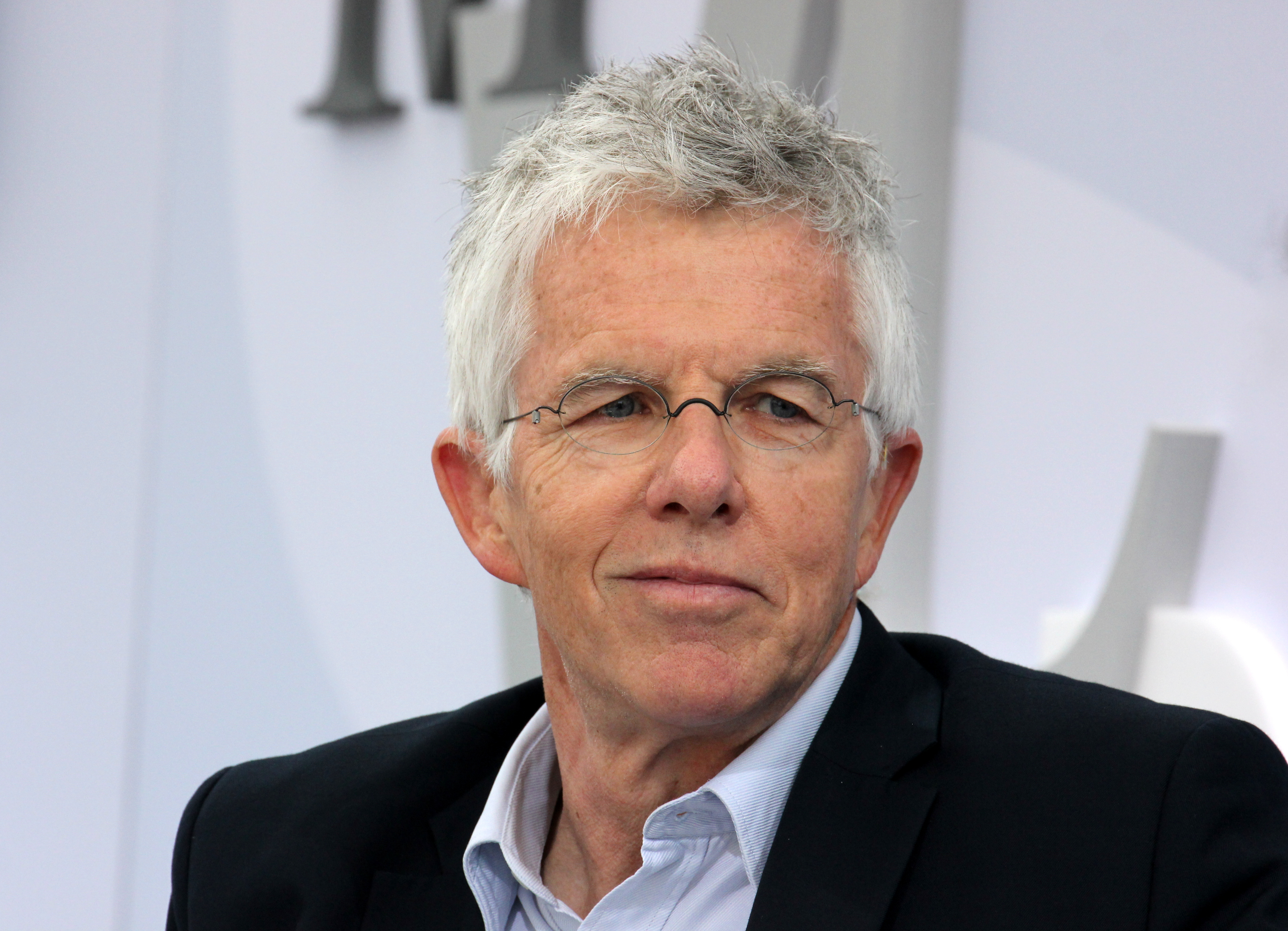
Straubhaar at the Leipzig Book Fair in 2017

Thomas Straubhaar (born 2 August 1957) is a Swiss economist and migration researcher. He is a professor for international economic relations at the University of Hamburg.

== Life and career ==
Straubhaar was born on 2 August 1957 in Unterseen, Bern, in Switzerland.

He graduated from the University of Bern in 1981 with a degree in economics and minors in operations research and mathematics. From 1981 to 1989, he was an assistant at the Institute of Economics there. In 1983 he received his doctorate under the supervision of Egon Tuchtfeldt and in 1986 his habilitation with his work On the Economics of International Labor Migration. In the meantime, he conducted research at the University of California, Berkeley. In 1989/90 he was a lecturer in the postgraduate program in International Economic Relations at the University of Konstanz and from 1989 to 1992 he was a lecturer in Economic Policy at the University of Basel. In 1991/92, he also served as a deputy to the Chair of Economic Policy at the University of Freiburg.

In 1992, Straubhaar was appointed professor of economics at the University of the Federal Armed Forces Hamburg. Since 1999, he has been professor of international economic relations at the University of Hamburg and was also president of the Hamburg Institute of International Economics (HWWA), which closed in 2006. In 2005, Straubhaar became director of the then newly founded Hamburg Institute of International Economics (HWWI). Straubhaar announced in 2013 that he would step down from this position in September 2014. He also lectures regularly at the HSBA Hamburg School of Business Administration. From 2008 to 2011, he was a member of the Expert Council of German Foundations on Integration and Migration.

Straubhaar is an ambassador for the Initiative Neue Soziale Marktwirtschaft (INSM). He is a member of the boards of trustees of the Friedrich Naumann Foundation for Freedom (since 1994, Vertrauensdozent) and HASPA Finanzholding, is on the board of trustees of the Körber Foundation and the Edmund Siemers Foundation, and is a member of the BahnBeirat. Since 2013, he has been a Policy Fellow of the Institute on the Future of Work. Straubhaar is also a member of the German Academy of Science and Engineering (Acatech). He is a member of the Deutsche Bahn Group Advisory Board.

He is the initiator of the Pro Bürgergeld association and, together with Bernd Lucke and Michael Funke, initiated the Hamburg Appeal in 2005. Since 2014, he has been vice chairman of the Foundation - CLUB OF HAMBURG.[3] He writes as a columnist for WeltN24.

Straubhaar is married and father of three children.

== Advocacy of basic income ==
Straubhaar is a well-known advocate of universal basic income (UBI) in the German-speaking area.

He is of the opinion that implementing a UBI will be necessary in the near future due to technological unemployment and that a „Grundeinkommen garantiert Wohlstand für alle“ ("basic income guarantees prosperity for all").

According to Straubhaar, the concept of UBI is "at its core, nothing more than a fundamental tax reform" that "[bundles] all social policy measures into a single instrument, the basic income paid out unconditionally." He also considers a universal basic income to be socially just, arguing, although all citizens would receive the same amount in the form of the basic income at the beginning of the month, the rich would have lost significantly more money through taxes at the end of the month than they would have received through the basic income, while the opposite is the case for poorer people, similar to the concept of a negative income tax.

Straubhaar also thinks that „Im Zeitalter der Digitalisierung ist es mehr denn je wirtschaftlich unsinnig, Menschen zu zwingen, Arbeiten zu erledigen, die menschenunwürdig sind. Der Mensch ist ökonomisch zu wertvoll, um ihn gefährliche, riskante und gesundheitsschädigende Arbeiten machen zu lassen und ihn dann Jahrzehnte bis zum Lebensende krank durch den Sozialstaat zu schleppen“ ("In the age of digitization, it is more economically senseless than ever to force people to do work that is inhumane. People are too valuable economically to be forced to do dangerous, risky and unhealthy work and then be dragged through the welfare state for decades until the end of their lives").

== Awards ==
Straubhaar received several scholarships (including from the Swiss National Science Foundation and Die Zeit) and was awarded the following prizes:

- 1987: Eduard Adolf Stein Prize of the University of Bern and Hermann Lindrath Prize of the International Association for Social Policy.
- 2004: Ludwig Erhard Prize for Economic Journalism of the Ludwig Erhard Foundation.
- 2005: Swiss Abroad Award of the Free Democratic Party of Switzerland.
- 2006: Audience Award of the business magazine Made in Germany of Deutsche Welle.

== Works (selection) ==
- Arbeitskräftewanderung und Zahlungsbilanz. Eine empirische Untersuchung am Beispiel der Rücküberweisungen nach Griechenland, Portugal, Spanien und die Türkei (= Berner Beiträge zur Nationalökonomie. Band 45). Haupt, Bern inter alia 1983, ISBN 3-258-03286-6.
- with Klaus M. Leisinger and Egon Tuchtfeldt: Studien zur Entwicklungsökonomie (= Sozioökonomische Forschungen. Band 20). Haupt, Bern u. a. 1986, ISBN 3-258-03665-9.
- On the economics of international labor migration (= Beiträge zur Wirtschaftspolitik. Band 49). Haupt, Bern u. a. 1988, ISBN 3-258-04001-X.
- with Silvio Borner and Aymo Brunetti: Schweiz-AG. Vom Sonderfall zum Sanierungsfall? 3. Auflage. Verlag Neue Zürcher Zeitung, Zürich 1990, ISBN 3-85823-305-6.
- mit Manfred Winz: Reform des Bildungswesens. Kontroverse Aspekte aus ökonomischer Sicht (= Sozioökonomische Forschungen. Band 27). Haupt, Bern u. a. 1992, ISBN 3-258-04693-X.
- with Peter A. Fischer: Ökonomische Integration und Migration in einem Gemeinsamen Markt. 40 Jahre Erfahrung im Nordischen Arbeitsmarkt (= Beiträge zur Wirtschaftspolitik. Band 59). Haupt, Bern u. a. 1994, ISBN 3-258-04989-0.
- mit Silvio Borner: Die Schweiz im Alleingang. Verlag Neue Zürcher Zeitung, Zürich 1994, ISBN 3-85823-490-7.
- Migration im 21. Jahrhundert (= Beiträge zur Ordnungstheorie und Ordnungspolitik. Band 167). Mohr Siebeck, Tübingen 2002, ISBN 3-16-147717-0.
- with Rainer Winkelmann (as publisher): The European Reform Logjam and the Economics of Reform. Duncker & Humblot, Berlin 2004, ISBN 3-428-11659-3.
- with Gunnar Geyer, Heinz Locher, Jochen Pimpertz and Henning Vöpel: Wachstum und Beschäftigung im Gesundheitswesen. Beschäftigungswirkungen eines modernen Krankenversicherungssystems (= Beiträge zum Gesundheitsmanagement. Band 14). Nomos, Baden-Baden 2006, ISBN 3-8329-1970-8.
- with Michael Hüther: Die gefühlte Ungerechtigkeit. Warum wir Ungleichheit aushalten müssen, wenn wir Freiheit wollen. Econ, Berlin 2009, ISBN 978-3-430-30036-0.
- Der Untergang ist abgesagt: Wider die Mythen des demografischen Wandels. edition Körber-Stiftung, Hamburg 2016, ISBN 978-3-89684-174-2.
- Radikal gerecht : Wie das bedingungslose Grundeinkommen den Sozialstaat revolutioniert. Edition Körber, Hamburg 2017.
- with Franz Wauschkuhn: Schifffahrtszyklen. Osburg Verlag, Dezember 2018. ISBN 978-3-95510-186-2
- Die Stunde der Optimisten : So funktioniert die Wirtschaft der Zukunft. Edition Körber, Hamburg 2019, ISBN 978-3-89684-271-8.
- Grundeinkommen jetzt! Nur so ist die Marktwirtschaft zu retten. NZZ Libro, Zurich 2021, ISBN 978-3-907291-52-8.
