= Bödeli =

Land between Lake Thun and Lake Brienz, Switzerland

Coordinates: 46.684°N 7.854°E

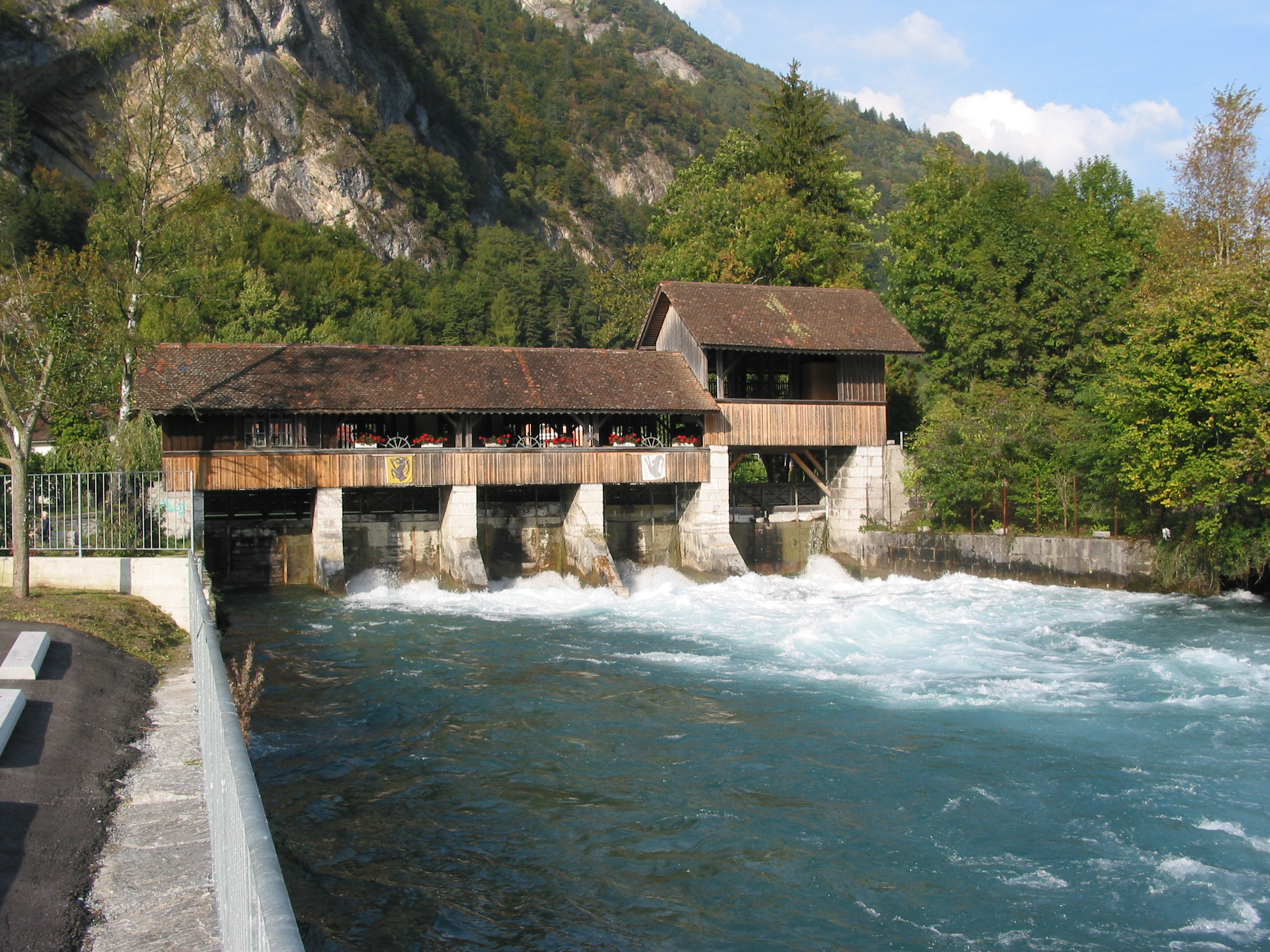
The sluice gates controlling the flow of the Aare in the middle of Bödeli

Bödeli (lit.: the Swiss German diminutive term for ground) is the tongue of land between Lake Thun and Lake Brienz in the Bernese Oberland of Switzerland. Lake Thun and Lake Brienz were not yet separate after the last ice age. The rivers Lütschine from the south and the Lombach from the north brought enough debris to cause a partitioning over the millennia. Now Lake Brienz has a water level about 2 metres (6.6 ft) higher than Lake Thun and the river Aare flows from one lake to the other through the Bödeli.

On the Bödeli are situated the villages and towns of Unterseen, Interlaken and Matten, which form a closed settlement area, and at the southern border are the villages of Wilderswil and Bönigen. From the south a hill range, the Ruuge, rises up.

== Bödelibahn ==
Between 1870 and 1874 the Bödeli Railway (Bödelibahn) was constructed to link the steamer quay at Därligen on Lake Thun with the quay at Bönigen on Lake Brienz. The railway company cunningly arranged for the route to cross the Aare twice with bridges offering no headroom beneath for shipping, thus making it effectively impossible for a steamer company to compete with them.
