= Böser Bund =

1445 peasant alliance in the Bernese Oberland

The Böser Bund ("evil league") was an alliance sworn on 2 May 1445 at Aeschi bei Spiez by several communities of the Bernese Oberland (Aeschi, the Obersimmental, and the Niedersimmental), Saanen (which held a Burgrecht treaty with Bern), the town of Unterseen, and the subjects of Interlaken Monastery. The name was given to it by the authorities. It was the most important peasant revolt of the 15th century in the Bernese Oberland—alongside the rising of Interlaken's monastic subjects in 1445 and the Brienz conspiracy of 1446–1451—and was directed mainly against the military service and taxes demanded by Bern in the framework of its Confederate policy during the Old Zürich War.

== Course and outcome ==
Concluded for a term of twenty-one years, the league provided for an annual assembly at Aeschi, which was to serve as a body of arbitration and supervision between the authorities and the communes. Bern declined to intervene militarily and submitted to the Confederate arbitrators. These ordered the dissolution of the league in 1446, and in 1451 reached a settlement with Saanen.

== Bibliography ==
- P. Bierbrauer, Freiheit und Gemeinde im Berner Oberland, 1300–1700, 1991, pp. 170–177.
