= Weissenau Castle =

Castle in Unterseen, Switzerland

Weissenau Castle Ruins
- Ruine Weissenau
- Unterseen
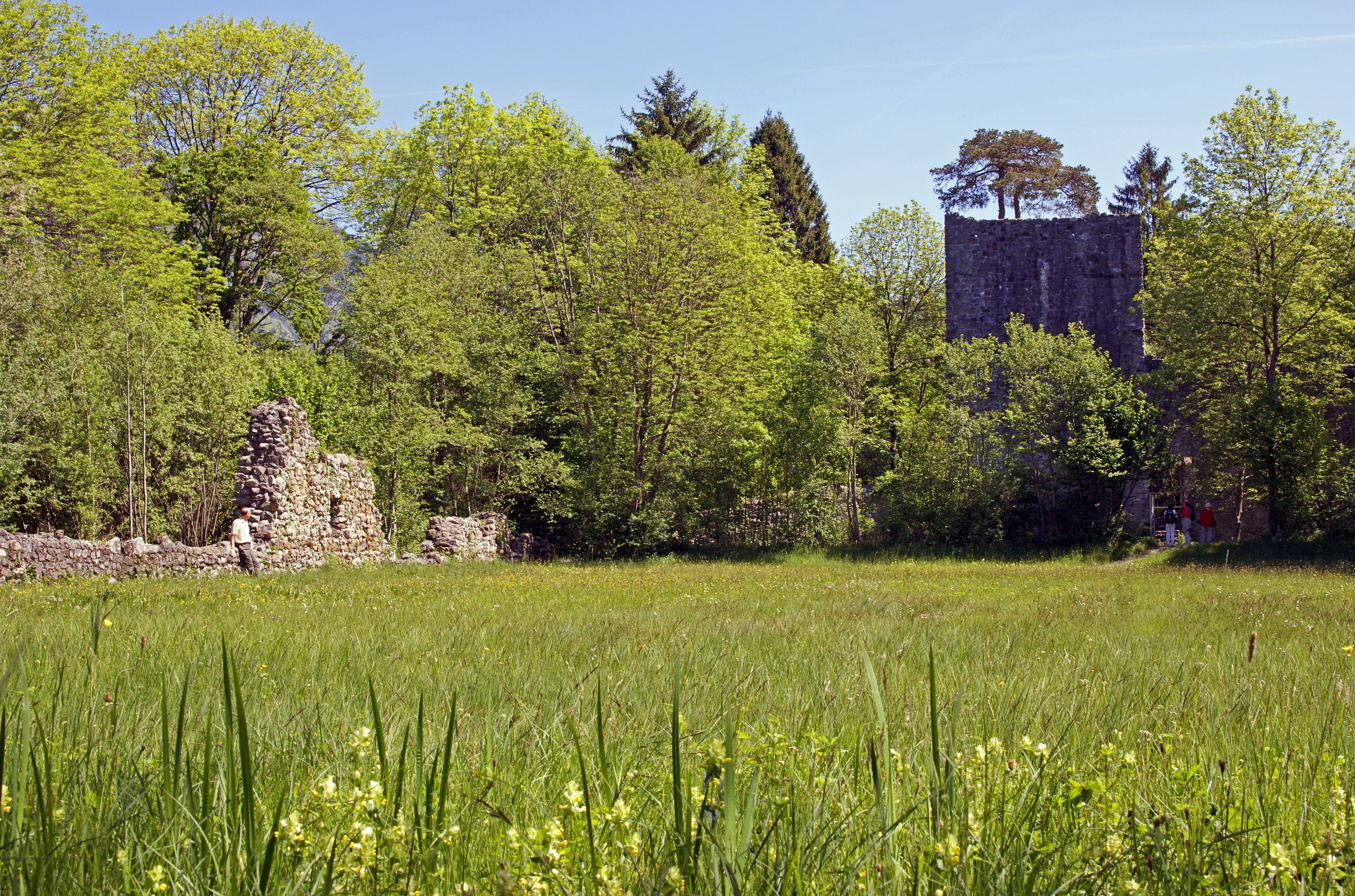
- Ruins of Weissenau Castle

Site information
- Open to the public: yes

Location
- Location within Switzerland
- Coordinates: 46.670105°N 7.832501°E

Site history
- Built: 13th century
- Built by: Freiherr von Weissenburg

Weissenau Castle is a ruined castle in the municipality of Unterseen of the Canton of Bern in Switzerland. It is a Swiss heritage site of national significance.

== History ==
The castle was first mentioned in the historic record as castrum Wissenowe in 1298. It is unclear whether it was built by the Lords of Rotenfluh (Unspunnen) and then given in fief to the Freiherr of Weissenau or if it was built by the Weissenau family as the center of their estates. The castle was built on what was an island at the mouth of the Aare river into Lake Thun. In the intervening centuries, the waterway silted up and the island became connected to shore. The market town of Widen grew up across the channel from the castle and in 1362 was connected to the castle by a bridge. Around 1334, the Freiherr of Weissenau joined other local nobles in a war against the growing power of the city of Bern. After the defeat of the nobles, Weissenau was forced to sell the castle and Widen to Interlaken Monastery to pay his debts. In 1365, the monastery moved the weekly markets and yearly fair away from Widen and to the village of Aarmühle (which is now Interlaken). Losing the market devastated Widen and it began to decline.

In 1528, the city of Bern adopted the new faith of the Protestant Reformation and began imposing it on the Bernese Oberland. The monastery and its villages joined in an unsuccessful rebellion against the new faith. After Bern imposed its will on the Oberland, they secularized the monastery and annexed all the monastery lands. Weissenau Castle and the small village of Widen became a part of the Bernese bailiwick of Interlaken. The castle was used as a prison into the 16th century, but began to fall into disrepair and eventually collapsed. In 1655 and again in 1700 the bailiwick made plans to renovate and repair the castle. However, neither plan was implemented.

== Castle site ==
Today only ruins remain of the castle. The castle residence and tower, portions of the castle building and the curtain wall are all still standing.

== See also ==
- List of castles in Switzerland
