= Unterseen =

- Municipality
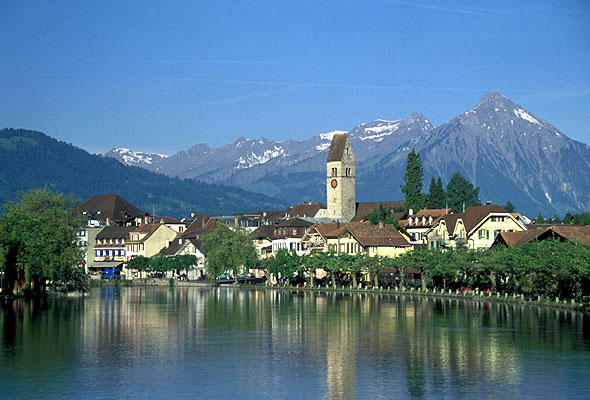

- Flag Coat of arms
- Location of Unterseen
- Location within Switzerland Location within Canton of Bern
- Coordinates: 46°41′N 7°51′E
- Country: Switzerland
- Canton: Bern
- District: Interlaken-Oberhasli

Government
  - Executive: Gemeinderat with 7 members
  - Mayor: Gemeindepräsident(in); Thomas Wegmann Ind. (as of 2026)

Area
  - Total: 13.99 km^{2} (5.40 sq mi)
- Elevation (Stedtlizentrum): 567 m (1,860 ft)

Population (December 2020)
  - Total: 5,760
  - Density: 412/km^{2} (1,070/sq mi)
- Demonym: German: Unterseener(in)
- Time zone: UTC+01:00 (CET)
  - Summer (DST): UTC+02:00 (CEST)
- Postal code: 3800
- SFOS number: 593
- ISO 3166 code: CH-BE
- Localities: Unteres Stadtfeld, Wellenacher, Neuhaus, Mühleholz, Däleboden, Chiemberg, Stolle, Luegiwald, Hindere Harder, Harderkulm, Vordere Harder, Hohmüedig, Mühleholz, Breite
- Surrounded by: Beatenberg, Därligen, Habkern, Interlaken, Leissigen, Ringgenberg
- Website: https://www.unterseen.ch

Unterseen (Swiss Standard German pronunciation: [ˈʊntərˌzeːən]) is a historic town and a municipality in the Interlaken-Oberhasli administrative district in the canton of Bern in Switzerland.

Unterseen is a german calque of the latin name Interlaken (meaning "between the lakes"), and is located on the flat area on the eastern shore of Lake Thun between the two creek Lombach below the Chienberg to the north and the Aare to the south, which both flow into Lake Thun. The historic town however is mainly found at the northern bank of the Aare, which flows here from Lake Brienz to Lake Thun (therefore lower lake). Just across the Aare is the town of Interlaken. Both municipalities are located on the flat alluvial land among steep mountains, which is also called the Bödeli.

Unterseen belongs to the Small Agglomeration Interlaken with 23,300 inhabitants (2014).

Along with Interlaken, Unterseen is an important tourist center in the Bernese Highlands, and from the town one can see the mountains Eiger, Mönch and Jungfrau.

== History ==
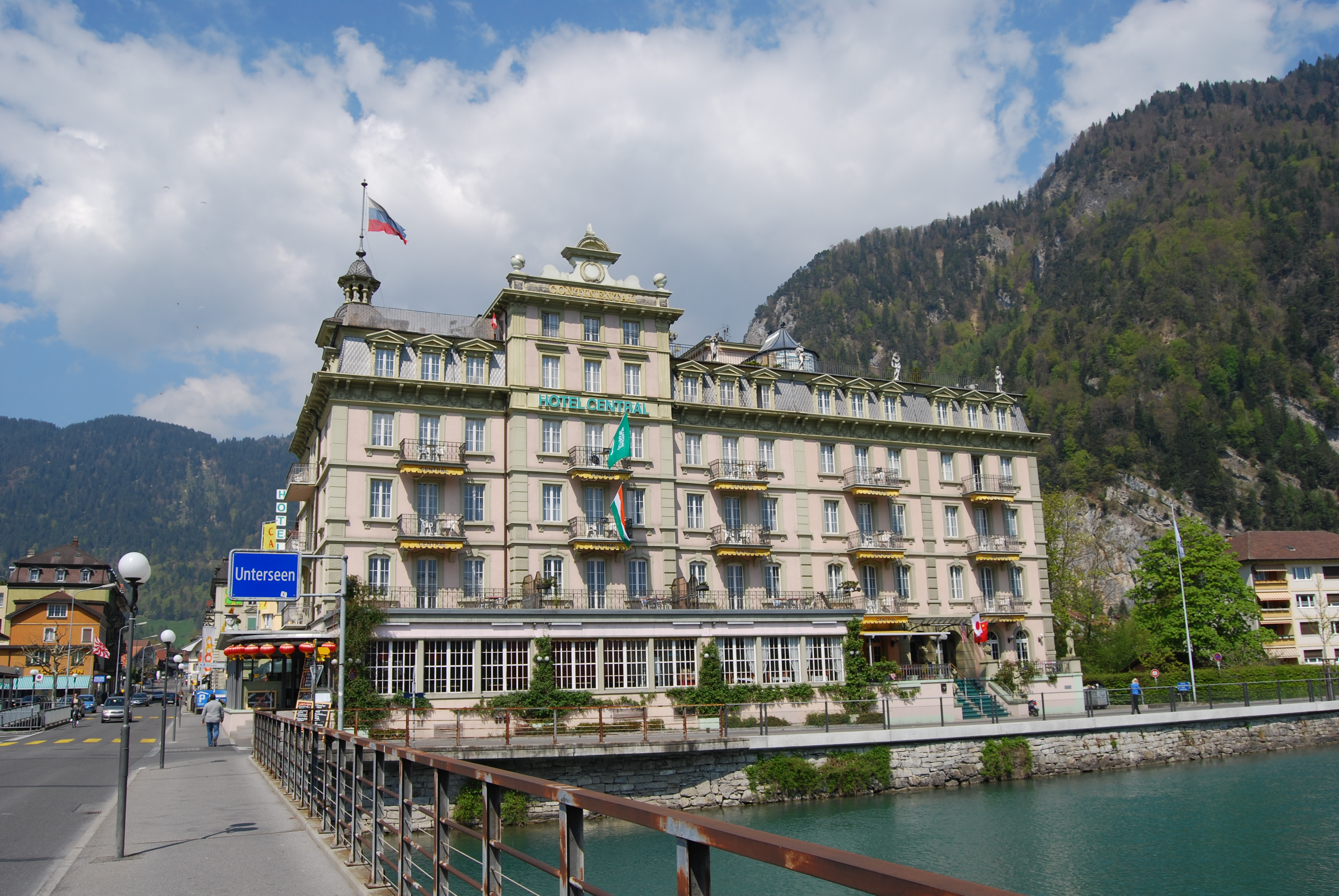
Hotel Central

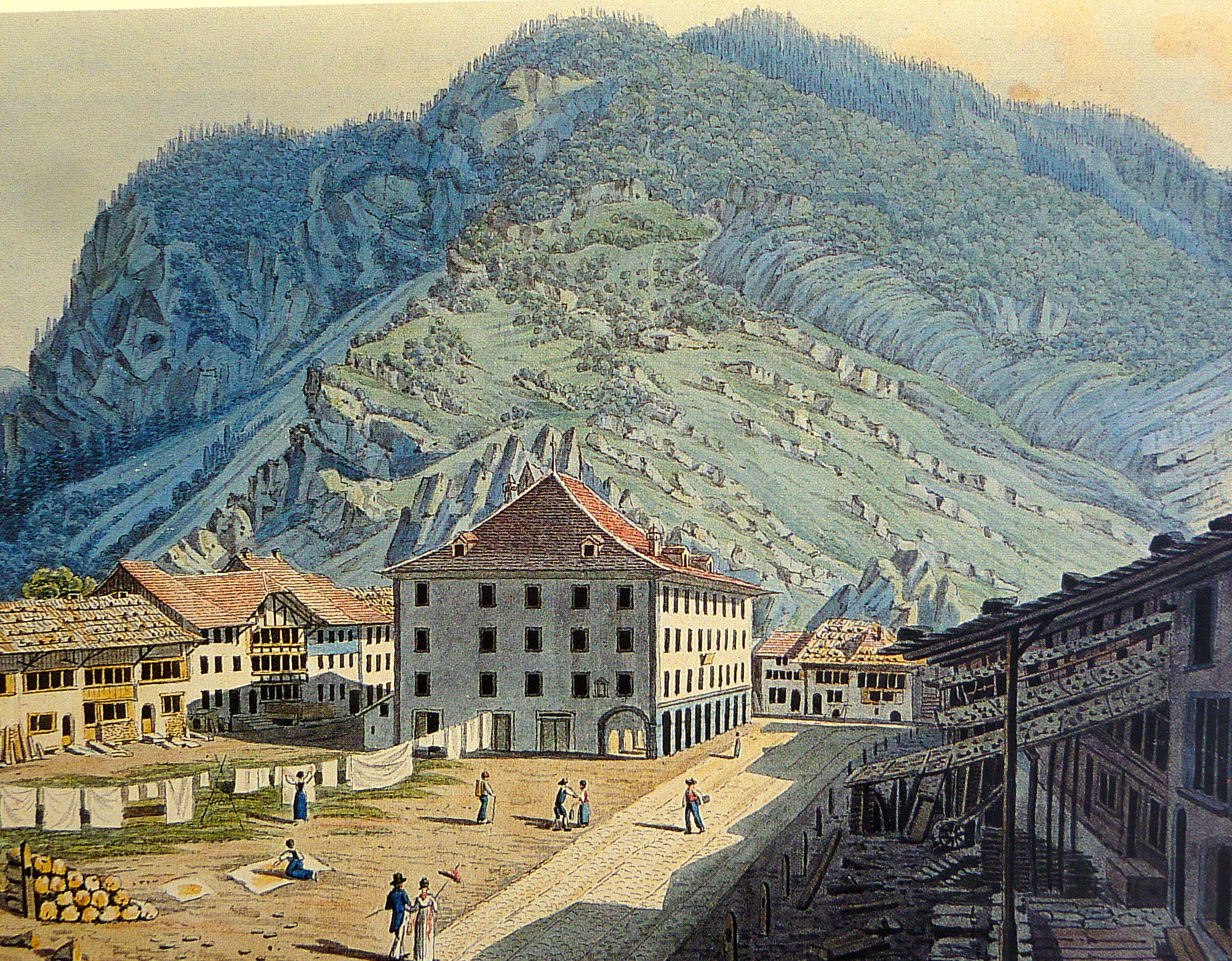
Print of Unterseen in 1819

The oldest traces of a settlement in the area are scattered neolithic tools. During the second century AD, a Roman graveyard was built in the area. An Early Middle Ages cemetery shows that there was a settlement in the area and by the High Middle Ages at least three forts had been built in the area. The area was known as Interlacus by 1133 when Interlaken Monastery was founded on the opposite side of the Aare. Interlaken village grew up across from the Monastery in the following years. By 1239 it was known as villa Inderlappen and in 1280 it was civitas Inderlappen. The city of Unterseen was founded on 13 July 1279, when King Rudolf I von Habsburg granted Baron Berchtold III of Eschenbach-Oberhofen permission to build a stronghold between the two lakes. The name came from "unter," which in Middle High German meant "between", and "seen," which means "lake." The fortification was given Stadtrecht (town privileges) in this agreement. By 1281 Interlaken and Unterseen was mentioned collectively as stat ze Inderlappen oder Undersewen and in 1291 they were called Inderlappen, genant Undersewen.

It was built by the secular nobles of the area to limit the growing power of the Monastery and to control a bridge over the Aare. The young town was put in an ongoing conflict with the Interlaken Monastery and early on sought protection from Bern. After the Swiss Confederation's victory in the Battle of Sempach in 1386, the villages were brought under Bernese control and a Bernese bailiff was appointed.

During the Reformation the town turned against Interlaken Monastery and did not join the Berner Oberland uprising. As a result of their loyalty they were rewarded with the Alp Sefinen. In 1364, a fire broke out in the Monastery's mill. It spread to the village of Unterseen and destroyed much of it. In 1470 Unterseen was burnt down for the second time and Bern undertook the reconstruction with the town house in the center. A chapel was first mentioned in the village in 1353. It was rebuilt in 1470 following the fire. The current church building was built in 1852 after part of the older church collapsed.

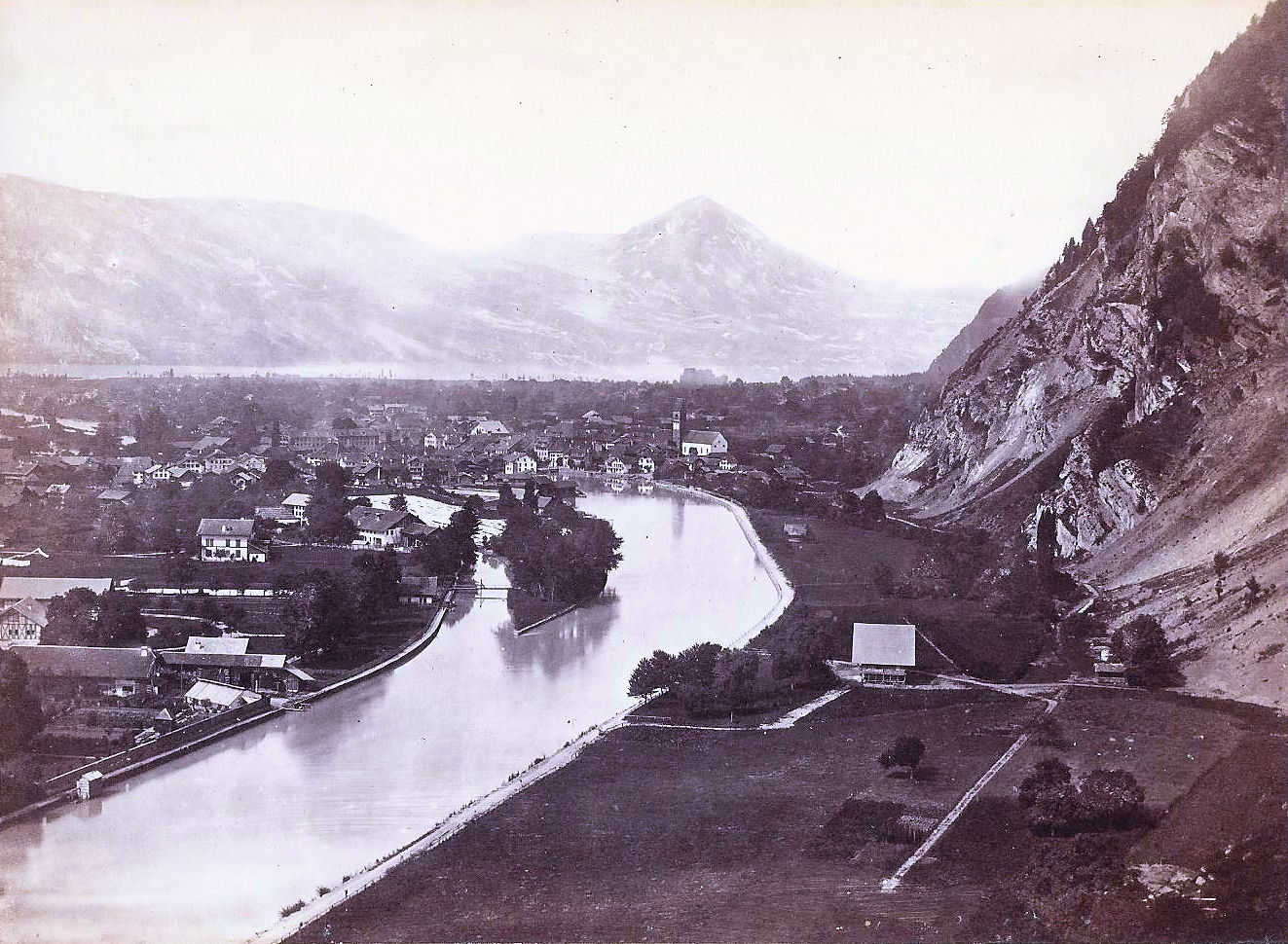
Unterseen (1865) by Francis Frith

After the establishment of the Helvetic Republic, Unterseen became a center of resistance against the reestablished Bern feudalism. The Unspunnenfest in 1805 and 1808 was planned as a means of reconciliation between the urban and rural citizens. The attempt was a failure and the government forbade such a festival. In 1815, many of the town's citizens played a role in the unrest in Interlaken.

In the early 19th century, the town wall and moat were broken down and the gate house was demolished in 1855.

In the burgeoning tourism of the middle of the 18th century, Unterseen played an important role, which has since been taken over in large part by Interlaken.

== Geography ==
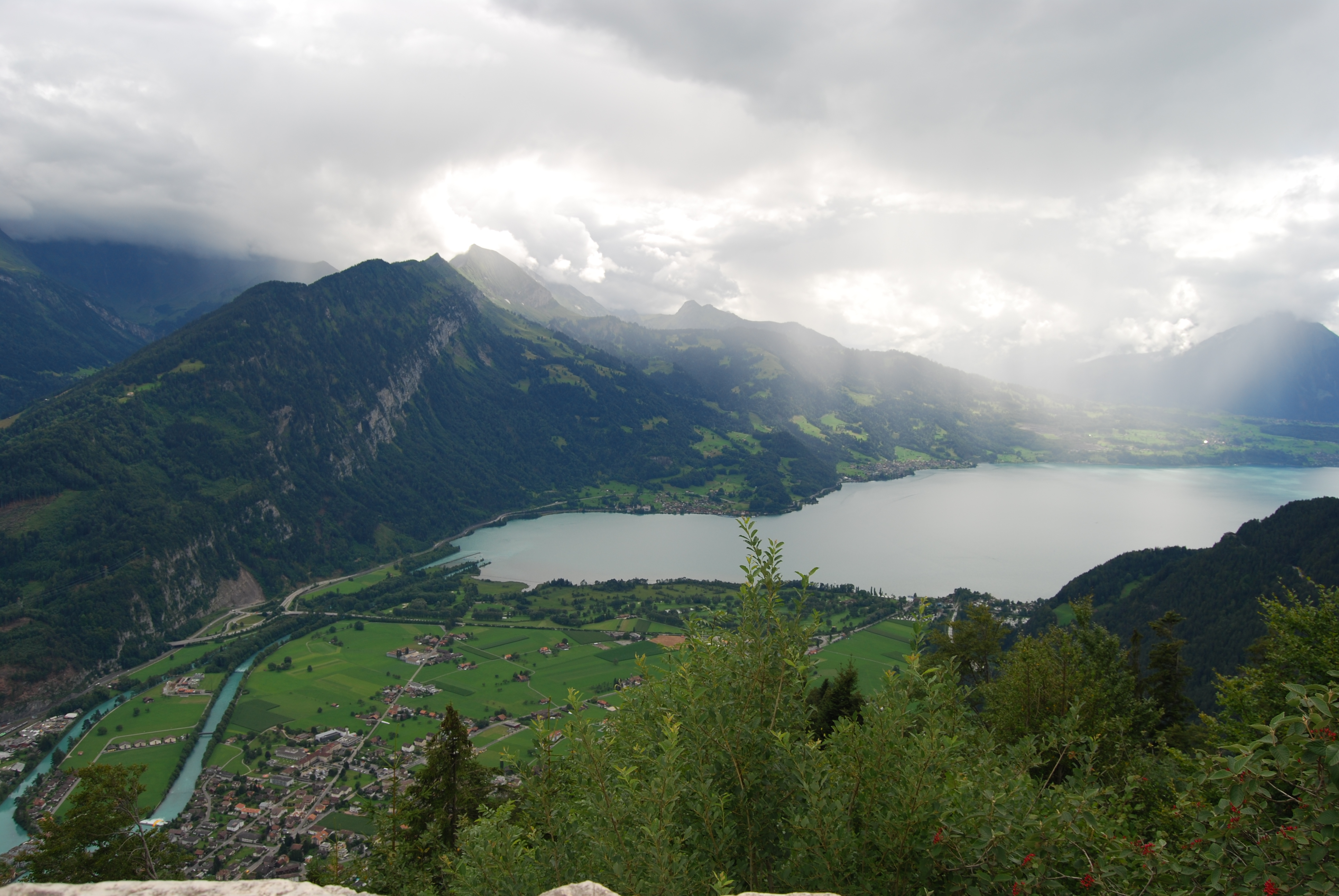
Unterseen (on right side of the Aare) and Lake Thun from Harderkulm

Unterseen has an area of 13.99 km^{2} (5.40 sq mi). Of this area, 2.55 km^{2} (0.98 mi^{2}) or 18.2% is used for agricultural purposes, while 8.43 km^{2} (3.25 mi^{2}) or 60.1% is forested. Of the rest of the land, 2.15 km^{2} (0.83 mi^{2}) or 15.3% is settled (buildings or roads), 0.36 km^{2} (0.14 mi^{2}) or 2.6% is either rivers or lakes and 0.57 km^{2} (0.22 mi^{2}) or 4.1% is unproductive land.

Of the built up area, housing and buildings made up 5.8% and transportation infrastructure made up 3.2%. while parks, green belts and sports fields made up 5.5%. Out of the forested land, 58.6% of the total land area is heavily forested and 1.5% is covered with orchards or small clusters of trees. Of the agricultural land, 5.7% is used for growing crops and 11.8% is pastures. Of the water in the municipality, 0.2% is in lakes and 2.4% is in rivers and streams. Of the unproductive areas, 2.7% is unproductive vegetation and 1.4% is too rocky for vegetation.

The municipality is located on the alluvial land called Bödeli between Lake Thun and Lake Brienz. It is across the Aare to the north from the town of Interlaken. It consists of the historic town of Unterseen and its urban village-like settlements, rural parts closer to the Lake Thun including several camping sites, some with beaches, a golf course on the Unteres Stadtfeld, and scattered settlements and woods on the nearby steep mountainside of Dälebode, Chienberg and Harder (Vordere Harder, Hintere Harder, Luegiwald).

On 31 December 2009 Amtsbezirk Interlaken, the municipality's former district, was dissolved. On the following day, 1 January 2010, it joined the newly created Verwaltungskreis Interlaken-Oberhasli.

== Coat of arms ==
The blazon of the municipal coat of arms is Or a Semi Ibex rampant couped Sable langued Gules.

== Demographics ==
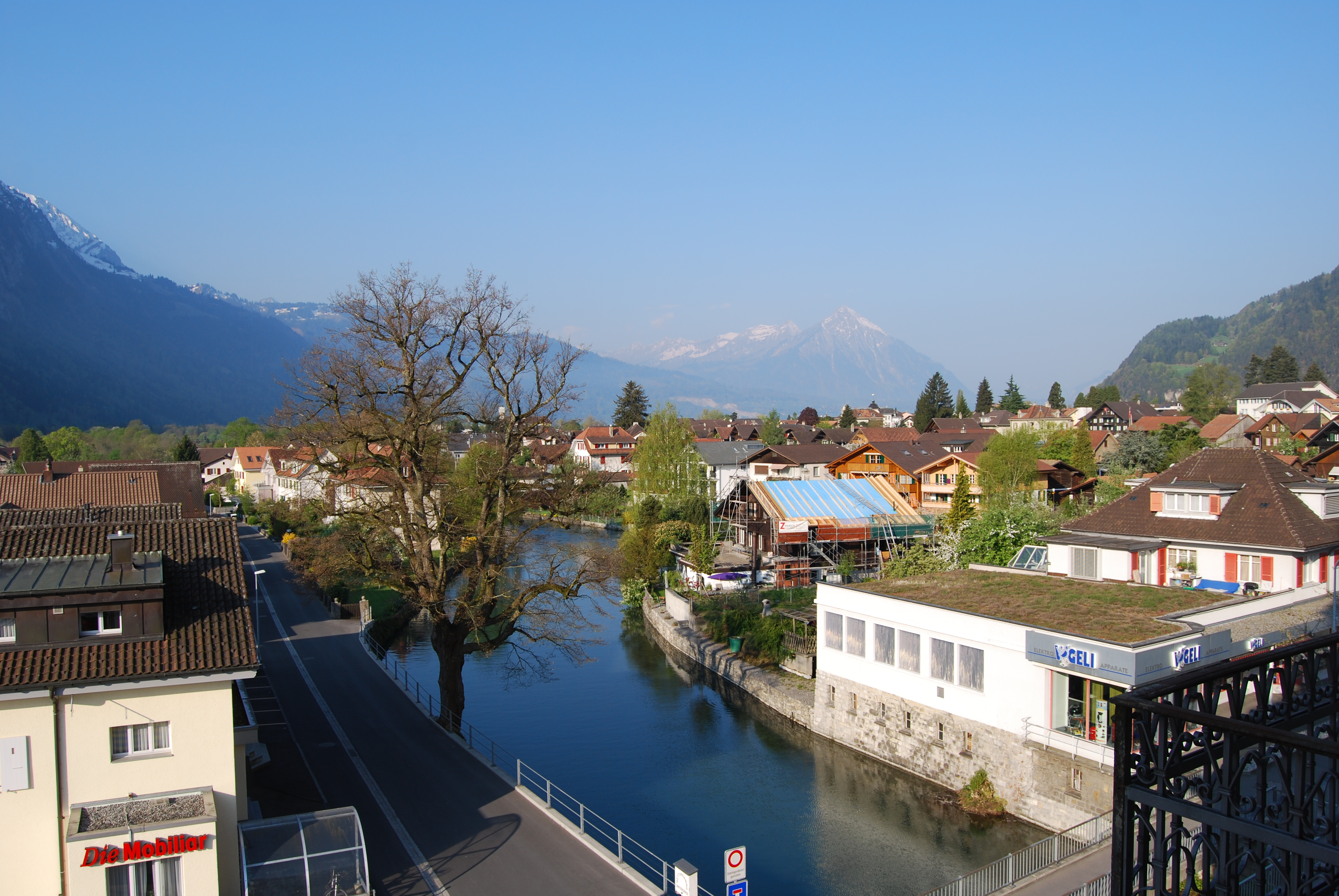
Houses in Unterseen

Unterseen has a population (as of December 2020) of 5,760. As of 2010, 14.5% of the population are resident foreign nationals. Over the last 10 years (2000-2010) the population has changed at a rate of 11.1%. Migration accounted for 11.1%, while births and deaths accounted for -0.9%.

Most of the population (as of 2000) speaks German (4,636 or 89.1%) as their first language, Portuguese is the second most common (110 or 2.1%) and Italian is the third (105 or 2.0%). There are 45 people who speak French and 2 people who speak Romansh.

As of 2008, the population was 47.4% male and 52.6% female. The population was made up of 2,199 Swiss men (40.0% of the population) and 406 (7.4%) non-Swiss men. There were 2,497 Swiss women (45.5%) and 390 (7.1%) non-Swiss women. Of the population in the municipality, 1,314 or about 25.3% were born in Unterseen and lived there in 2000. There were 2,091 or 40.2% who were born in the same canton, while 755 or 14.5% were born somewhere else in Switzerland, and 843 or 16.2% were born outside of Switzerland.

As of 2010, children and teenagers (0–19 years old) make up 18.2% of the population, while adults (20–64 years old) make up 61.4% and seniors (over 64 years old) make up 20.4%.

As of 2000, there were 2,088 people who were single and never married in the municipality. There were 2,370 married individuals, 419 widows or widowers and 324 individuals who are divorced.

As of 2000, there were 949 households that consist of only one person and 111 households with five or more people. In 2000, a total of 2,306 apartments (85.7% of the total) were permanently occupied, while 273 apartments (10.1%) were seasonally occupied and 113 apartments (4.2%) were empty. As of 2010, the construction rate of new housing units was 9.7 new units per 1000 residents. The vacancy rate for the municipality, in 2011, was 0.06%.

The historical population is given in the following chart:

== Heritage sites of national significance ==
The old city of Unterseen and the ruins of Weissenau Castle are listed as Swiss heritage site of national significance. The entire town of Unterseen is part of the Inventory of Swiss Heritage Sites.

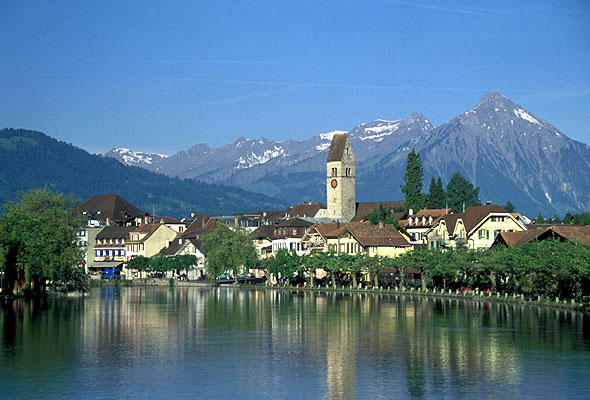
Old City of Unterseen

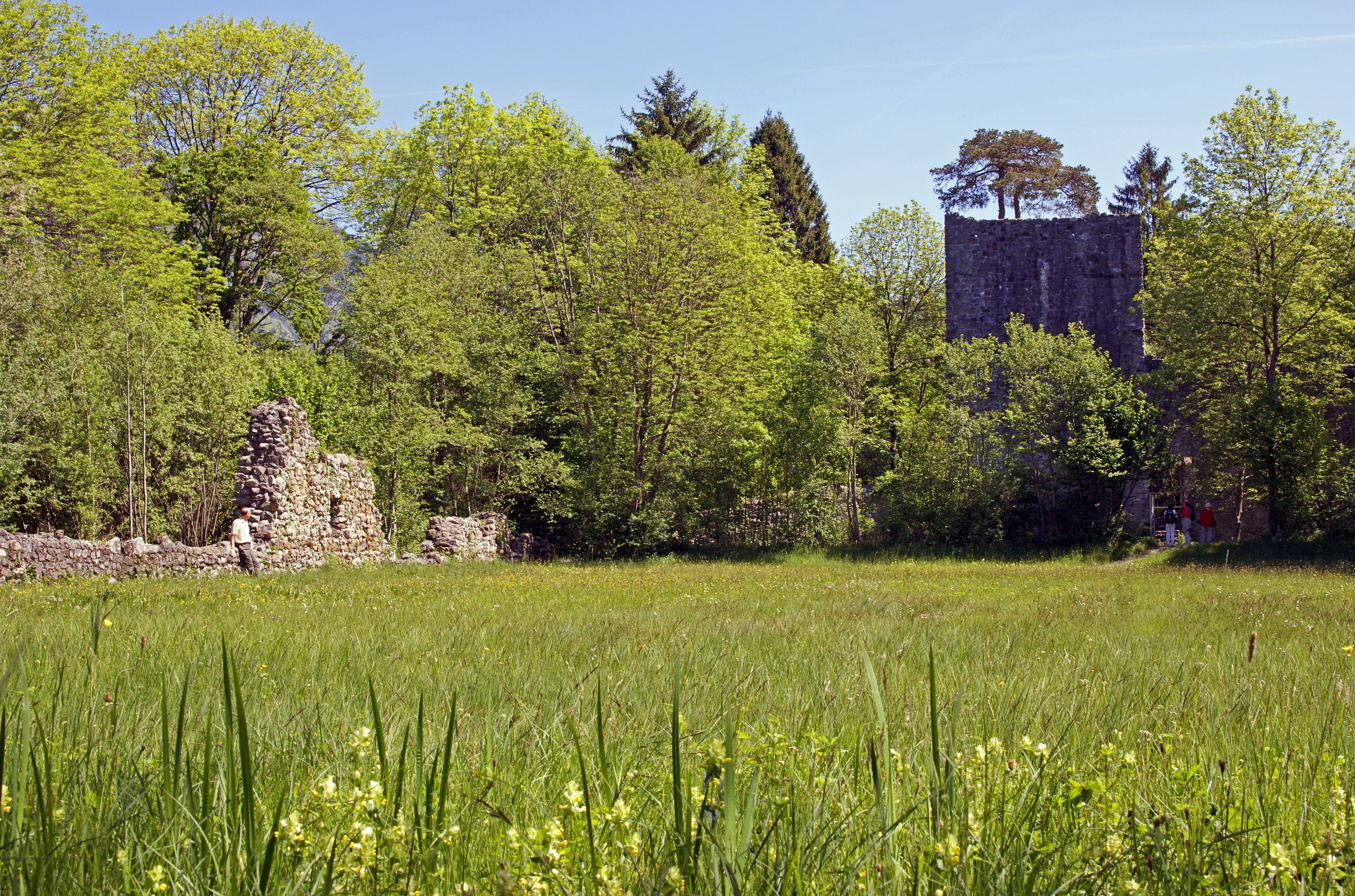
Weissenau Ruins

== Politics ==
In the 2011 federal election the most popular party was the Swiss People's Party (SVP) which received 26% of the vote. The next three most popular parties were the Social Democratic Party (SP) (19.1%), the Conservative Democratic Party (BDP) (16.3%) and the FDP.The Liberals (9.9%). In the federal election, a total of 2,068 votes were cast, and the voter turnout was 51.8%.

== Economy ==
As of 2011, Unterseen had an unemployment rate of 1.72%. As of 2008, there were a total of 2,243 people employed in the municipality. Of these, there were 63 people employed in the primary economic sector and about 21 businesses involved in this sector. 397 people were employed in the secondary sector and there were 50 businesses in this sector. 1,783 people were employed in the tertiary sector, with 178 businesses in this sector. There were 2,725 residents of the municipality who were employed in some capacity, of which females made up 47.2% of the workforce.

In 2008 there were a total of 1,754 full-time equivalent jobs. The number of jobs in the primary sector was 40, of which 39 were in agriculture and were in fishing or fisheries. The number of jobs in the secondary sector was 355 of which 240 or (67.6%) were in manufacturing and 108 (30.4%) were in construction. The number of jobs in the tertiary sector was 1,359. In the tertiary sector; 174 or 12.8% were in wholesale or retail sales or the repair of motor vehicles, 237 or 17.4% were in a hotel or restaurant, 28 or 2.1% were in the information industry, 31 or 2.3% were the insurance or financial industry, 72 or 5.3% were technical professionals or scientists, 55 or 4.0% were in education and 588 or 43.3% were in health care.

In 2000, there were 1,125 workers who commuted into the municipality and 1,761 workers who commuted away. The municipality is a net exporter of workers, with about 1.6 workers leaving the municipality for every one entering. Of the working population, 11.5% used public transportation to get to work, and 35.2% used a private car.

== Religion ==
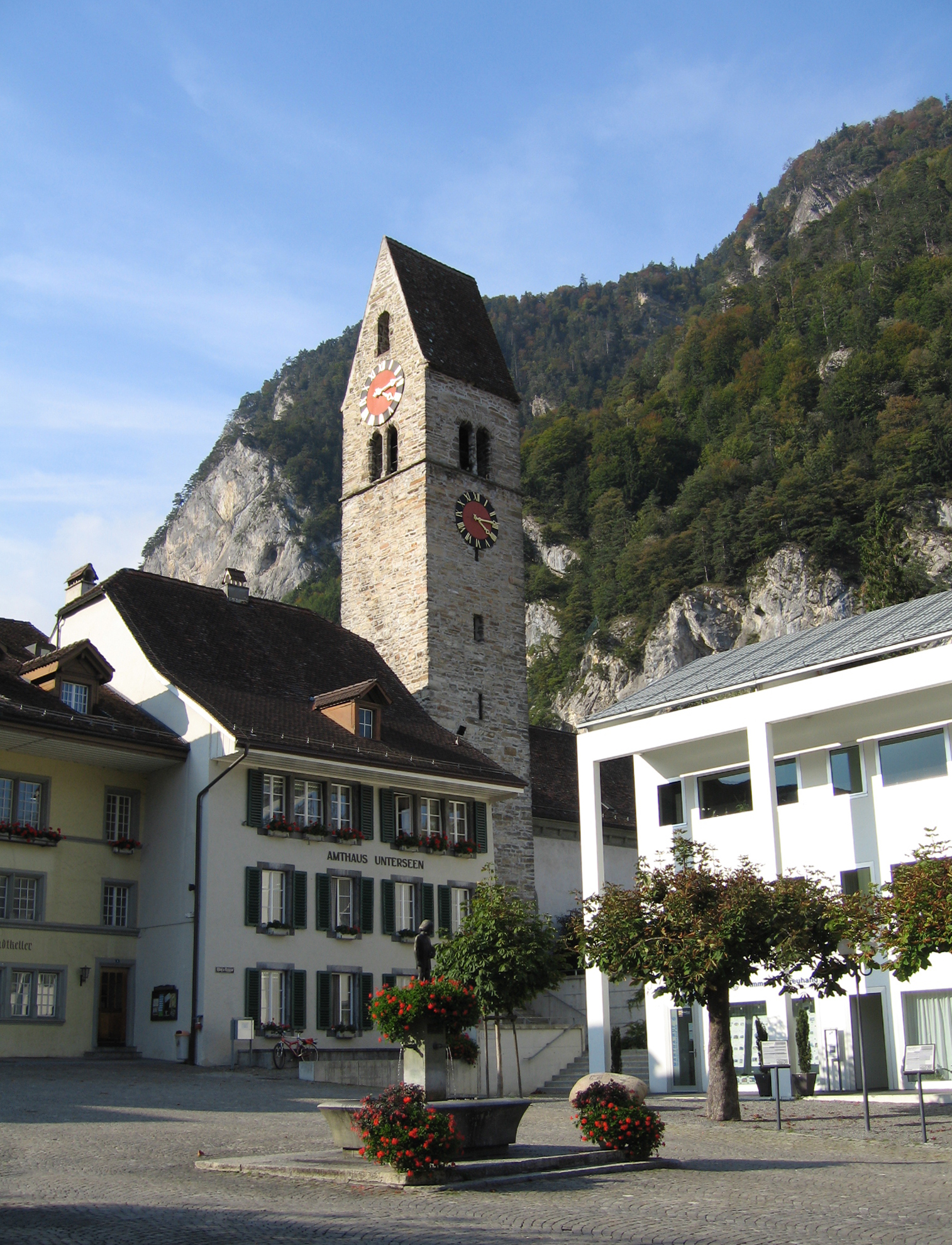
Unterseen town square and village church

From the 2000 census, 831 or 16.0% were Roman Catholic, while 3,403 or 65.4% belonged to the Swiss Reformed Church. Of the rest of the population, there were 47 members of an Orthodox church (or about 0.90% of the population), there was 1 individual who belongs to the Christian Catholic Church, and there were 540 individuals (or about 10.38% of the population) who belonged to another Christian church. There were 3 individuals (or about 0.06% of the population) who were Jewish, and 119 (or about 2.29% of the population) who were Islamic. There were 14 individuals who were Buddhist, 25 individuals who were Hindu and 2 individuals who belonged to another church. 320 (or about 6.15% of the population) belonged to no church, are agnostic or atheist, and 164 individuals (or about 3.15% of the population) did not answer the question.

== Education ==
In Unterseen about 2,238 or (43.0%) of the population have completed non-mandatory upper secondary education, and 599 or (11.5%) have completed additional higher education (either university or a Fachhochschule). Of the 599 who completed tertiary schooling, 64.6% were Swiss men, 25.2% were Swiss women, 5.7% were non-Swiss men and 4.5% were non-Swiss women.

The Canton of Bern school system provides one year of non-obligatory Kindergarten, followed by six years of Primary school. This is followed by three years of obligatory lower Secondary school where the students are separated according to ability and aptitude. Following the lower Secondary students may attend additional schooling or they may enter an apprenticeship.

During the 2010–11 school year, there were a total of 560 students attending classes in Unterseen. There were 4 kindergarten classes with a total of 81 students in the municipality. Of the kindergarten students, 22.2% were permanent or temporary residents of Switzerland (not citizens) and 24.7% have a different mother language than the classroom language. The municipality had 15 primary classes and 317 students. Of the primary students, 18.9% were permanent or temporary residents of Switzerland (not citizens) and 20.2% have a different mother language than the classroom language. During the same year, there were 8 lower secondary classes with a total of 162 students. There were 18.5% who were permanent or temporary residents of Switzerland (not citizens) and 18.5% have a different mother language than the classroom language.

As of 2000, there were 31 students in Unterseen who came from another municipality, while 115 residents attended schools outside the municipality.

== Notable people ==
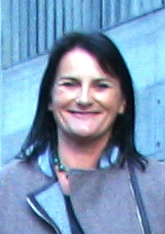
Christine Häsler, 2015

- Adrian Frutiger (1928 in Unterseen – 2015), a Swiss typeface designer who influenced the direction of type design
- Thomas Straubhaar (born 1957 in Unterseen), a Swiss economist and migration researcher
- Christine Häsler (born 1963 in Unterseen), a Swiss politician, member of the National Council since 2015

Sport

- Marcel Perrière (1890 – 1966 in Unterseen), a Swiss racing cyclist, the Swiss National Road Race champion in 1911
- Hansruedi Schneider (born 1926 in Unterseen), a Swiss former sports shooter, competed at the 1960 and 1964 Summer Olympics
- Liselotte Michel (born 1939 in Unterseen), a Swiss alpine skier, competed in three events at the 1960 Winter Olympics
- Samuel Balmer (born 1968 in Unterseen), a former Swiss professional ice hockey defenceman, competed in the 1992 Winter Olympics
- Eveline Bhend (born 1981 in Unterseen), a Swiss freestyle skier, competed at the 2014 Winter Olympics
- Franziska Kaufmann (born 1987 in Unterseen), a Swiss curler from Grindelwald
