= Subdivisions of the canton of Bern =

On 1 January 2010, the 26 districts (German: Amtsbezirke, French: districts) of the Canton of Bern were combined into 10 new precincts (German: Verwaltungskreise, French: arrondissement administratif).

They are grouped into five regions (German: Verwaltungsregionen).

The existence of the 26 districts remains through the laws and Constitution of the Canton of Berne (Art.3 al.2 Cst) and coexists with the new 10 precincts (German: Verwaltungskreise, French: arrondissement administratif). Although the original districts no longer serve any purpose.

As of 2024 there were 334 municipalities of the canton of Bern.

== Precincts 2010 ==
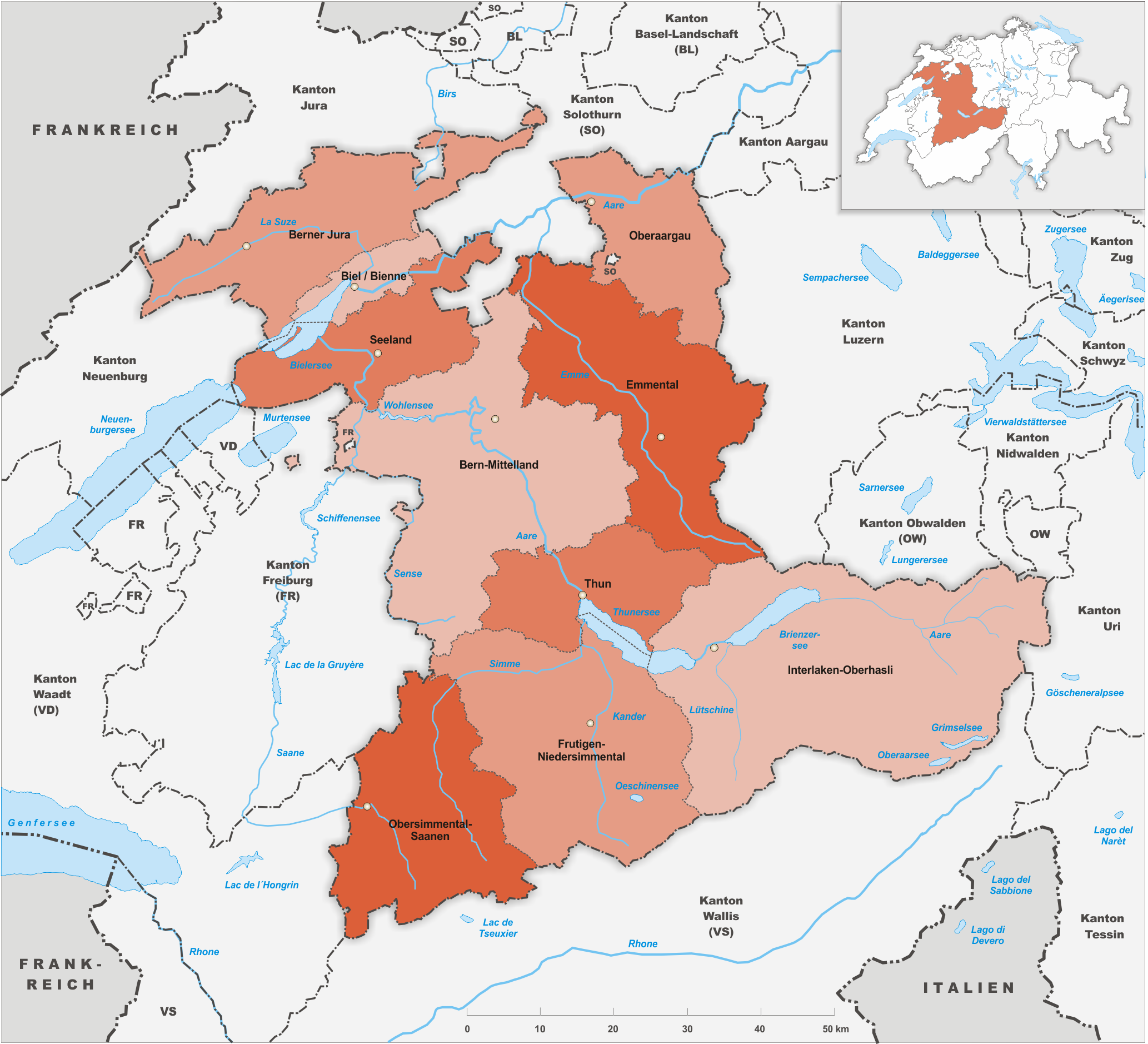
Districts of the canton of Bern

New district (Verwaltungskreis)	Capital	Region	Former district(s) (Amtsbezirk)
Bern-Mittelland	Ostermundigen	Bern-Mittelland	Bern, Fraubrunnen, Konolfingen, Laupen, Schwarzenburg and Seftigen
Biel/Bienne	Biel/Bienne	Seeland	Biel and about half of Nidau
Emmental	Langnau im Emmental	Emmental-Oberaargau	Burgdorf, Signau and Trachselwald
Frutigen-Niedersimmental	Frutigen	Bernese Oberland	Frutigen and Niedersimmental
Interlaken-Oberhasli	Interlaken	Bernese Oberland	Interlaken and Oberhasli
Jura Bernois	Courtelary	Jura Bernois Region	Courtelary, Moutier and La Neuveville
Oberaargau	Wangen an der Aare	Emmental-Oberaargau	Aarwangen and Wangen
Obersimmental-Saanen	Saanen	Bernese Oberland	Obersimmental and Saanen
Seeland	Aarberg	Seeland	Aarberg, Büren, Erlach and about half of Nidau
Thun	Thun	Bernese Oberland	Thun

== Districts ==
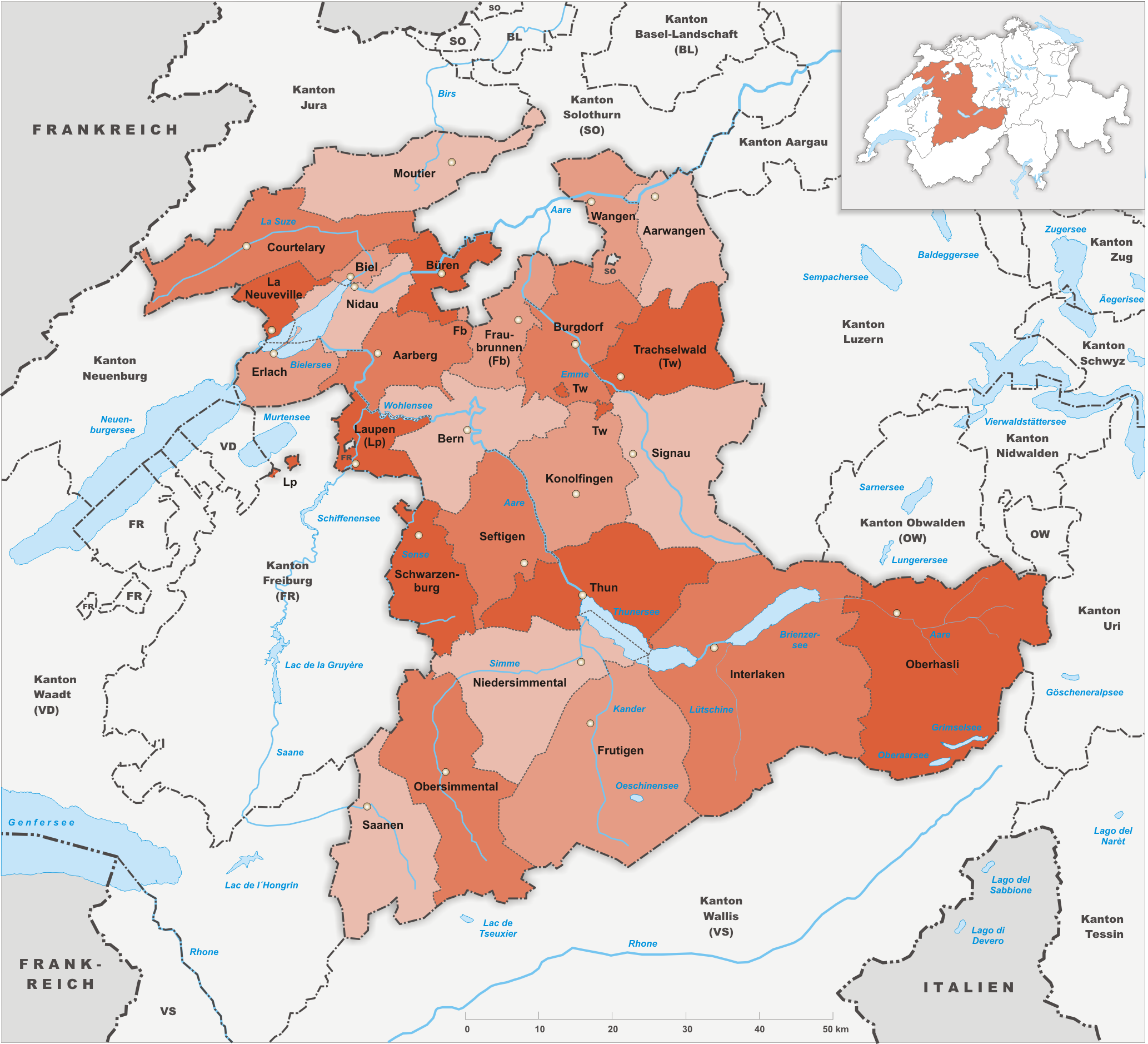
Former districts of the canton of Bern

The canton of Bern was also subdivided into 26 districts (German: Amtsbezirke; French: districts), which have no more administrative or political significance since the introduction of the new larger administrative subdivisions listed above.

The districts were:

- Aarberg with capital Aarberg
- Aarwangen with capital Aarwangen
- Bern with capital Bern
- Biel with capital Biel
- Büren with capital Büren an der Aare
- Burgdorf with capital Burgdorf
- Courtelary with capital Courtelary
- Erlach with capital Erlach
- Fraubrunnen with capital Fraubrunnen
- Frutigen with capital Frutigen
- Interlaken with capital Interlaken
- Konolfingen with capital Konolfingen
- Laupen with capital Laupen
- Moutier with capital Moutier
- La Neuveville with capital La Neuveville
- Nidau with capital Nidau
- Niedersimmental with capital Wimmis
- Oberhasli with capital Meiringen
- Obersimmental with capital Blankenburg
- Saanen with capital Saanen
- Schwarzenburg with capital Schwarzenburg
- Seftigen with capital Belp
- Signau with capital Langnau im Emmental
- Thun with capital Thun
- Trachselwald with capital Trachselwald
- Wangen with capital Wangen an der Aare

== Maps 1978 - 2025 ==
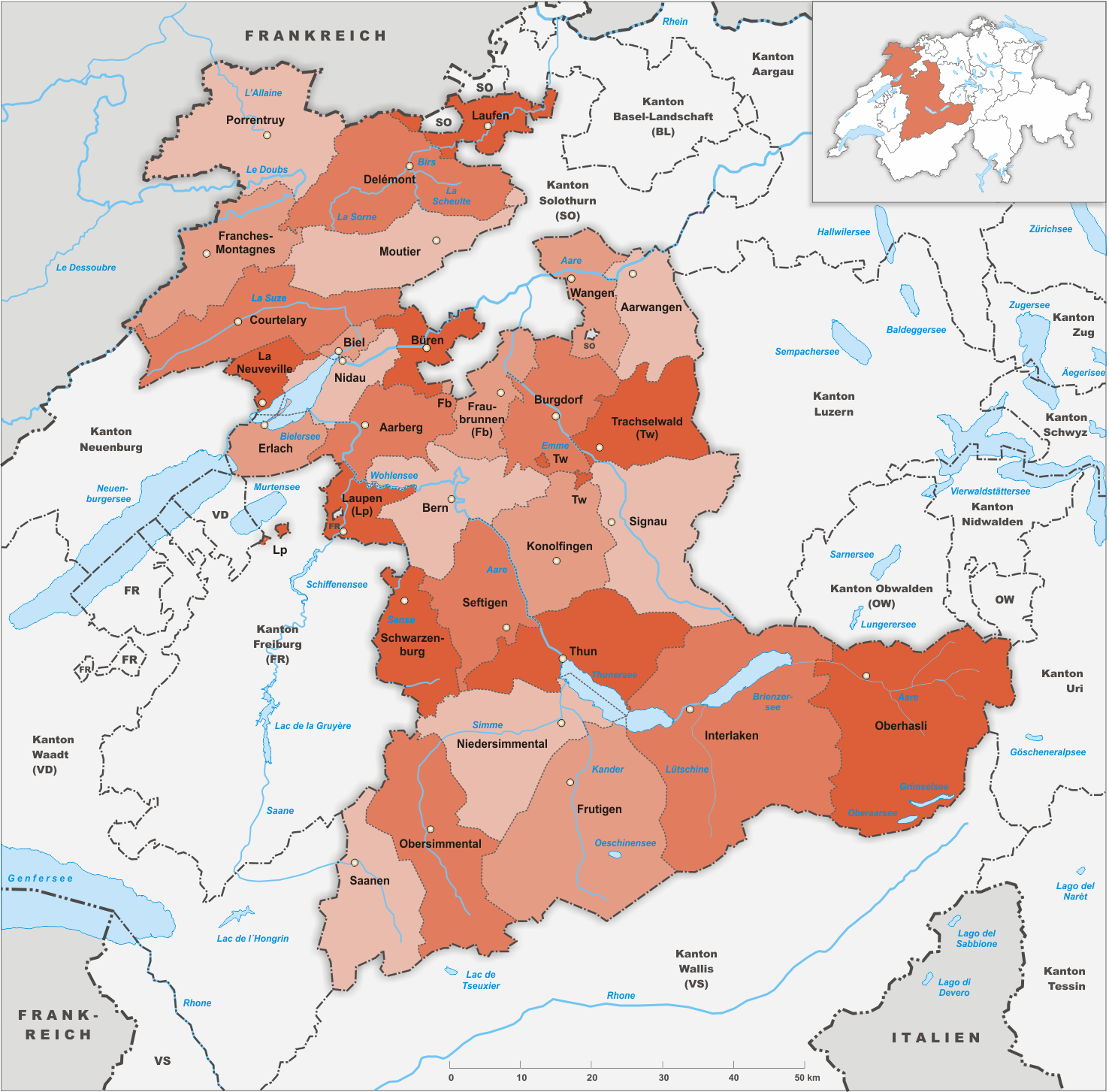
Amtsbezirke until 31 December 1978

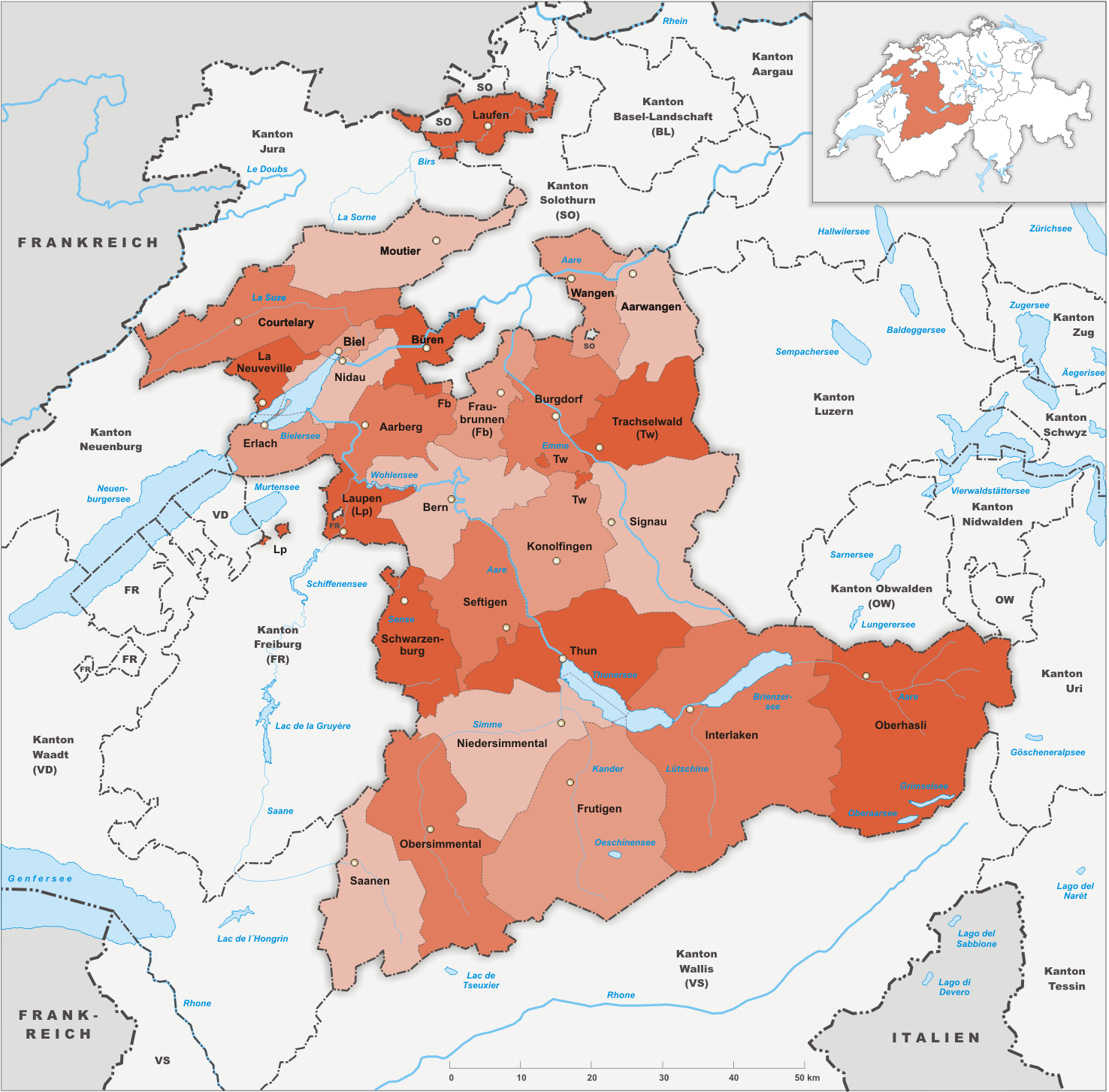
Amtsbezirke until 31 December 1993

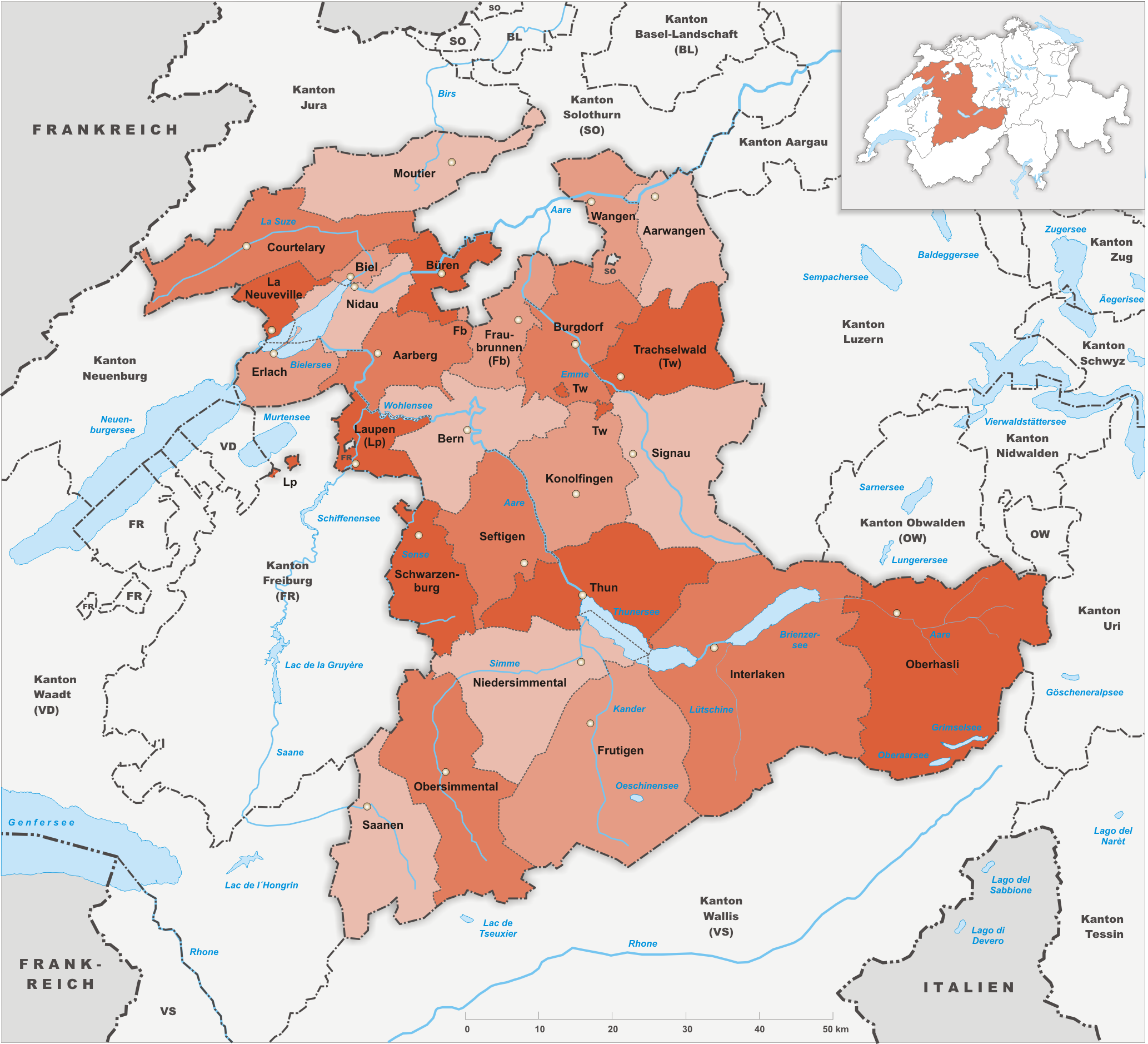
Amtsbezirke until 31 December 2009

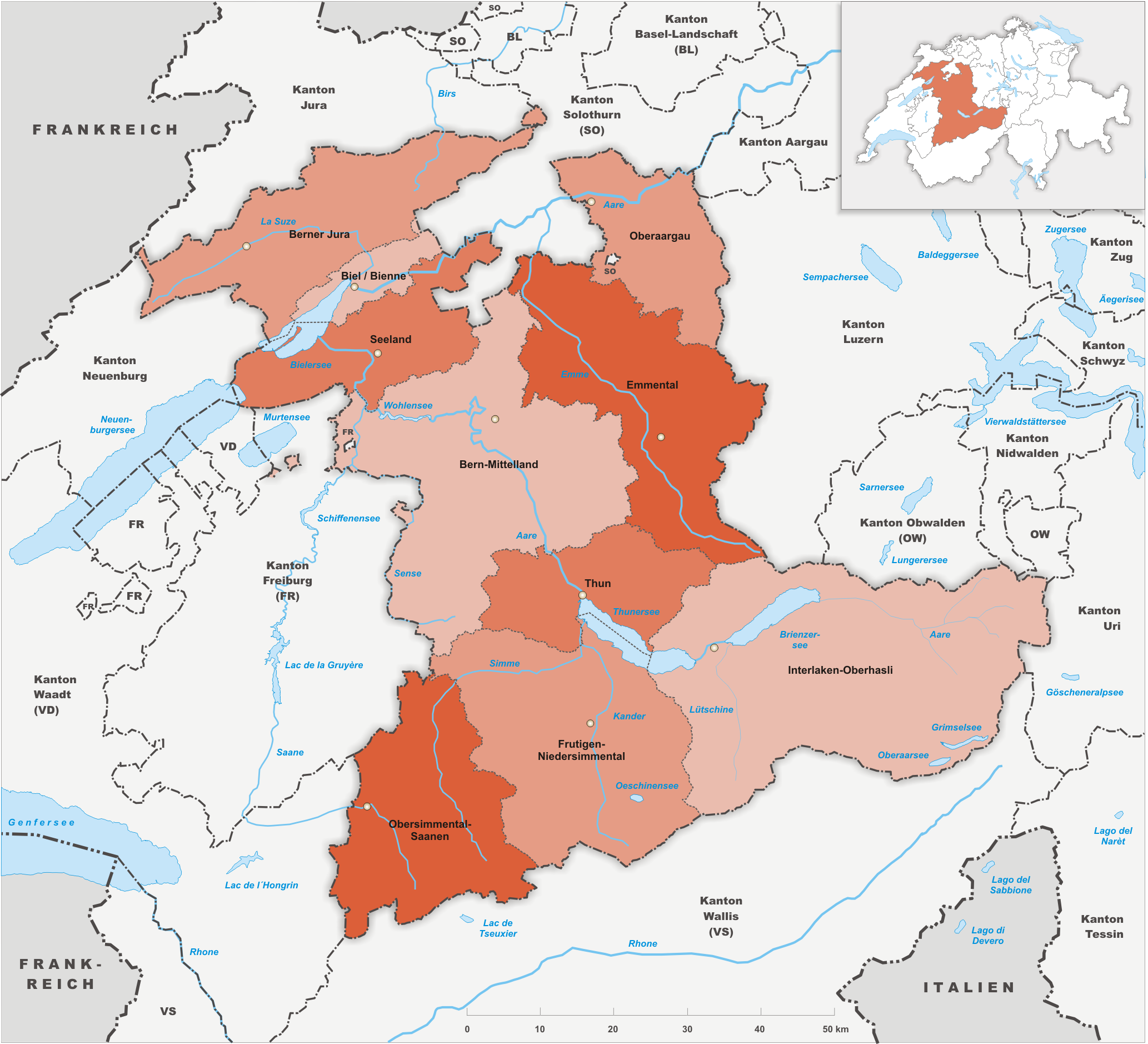
Verwaltungskreise until 31 December 2022

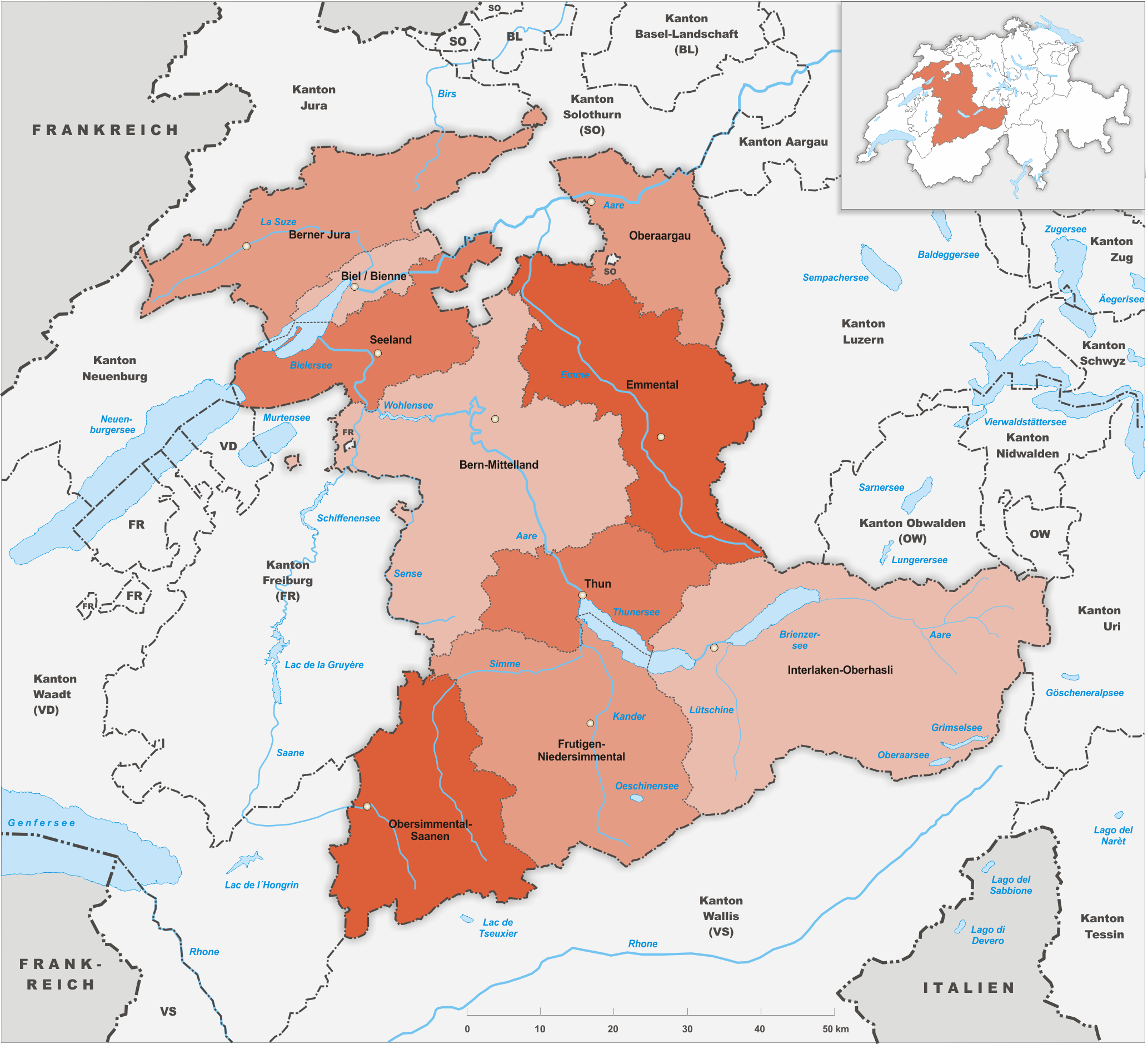
Verwaltungskreise until 31 December 2025
