= Bernese Oberland =

Higher part of the canton of Bern, Switzerland

Coordinates: 46°40′13″N 7°50′5″E

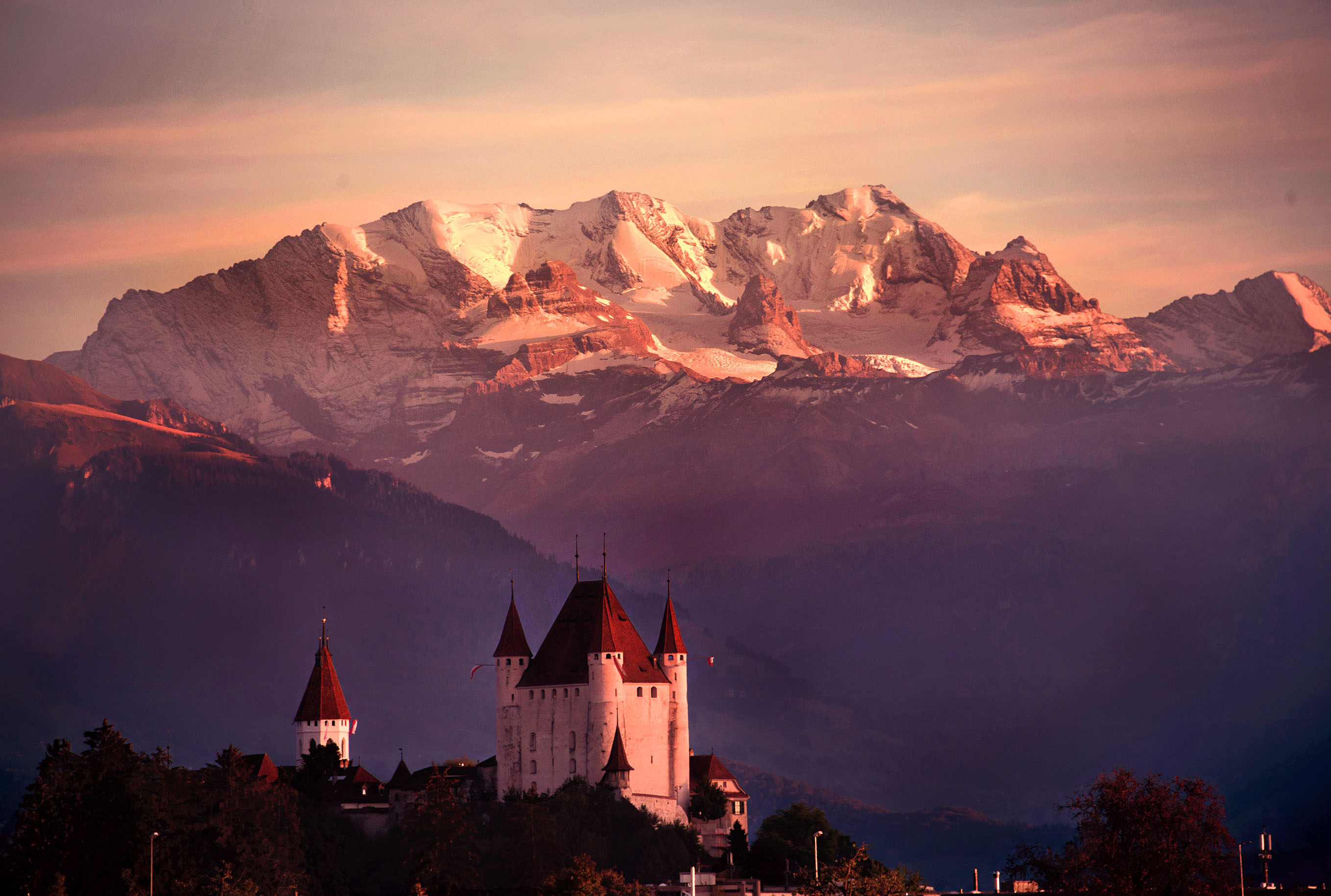
Thun Castle in front of the Blüemlisalp

The Bernese Oberland (German: Berner Oberland [ˈbɛrnər ˈoːbərland]; Alemannic German: Bärner Oberland; French: Oberland bernois [obɛʁlɑ̃d bɛʁnwa]), sometimes also known as the Bernese Highlands, is the highest and southernmost part of the canton of Bern, in Switzerland. It is one of the canton's five administrative regions (in which context it is referred to as Oberland without further specification). It constitutes the Alpine region of the canton and the northern side of the Bernese Alps, including many of its highest peaks, among which the Finsteraarhorn (4,274 m (14,022 ft)), the highest in both range and canton.

The region essentially coincides with the upper basin of the Aare, the latter notably including Lake Thun and Lake Brienz, the two large lakes of the region. On the banks of the lakes or the Aare are the main settlements of Thun, Spiez, Interlaken, Brienz and Meiringen. The numerous side valleys of the Bernese Oberland include a large number of Alpine villages, many of them being tourist resorts and connected by mountain railways to Spiez and Interlaken. The Lötschberg, a major north-south axis through the Alps, links the region with both the capital of the canton, Bern, and its sizable southern neighbour, the canton of Valais.

The flag of the Bernese Oberland consists of a black eagle in a gold field (in reference to the region's old status as reichsfrei) over two fields in the cantonal colours of red and black.

The Swiss German dialects spoken in the Bernese Oberland are Highest Alemannic German, contrasting with the High Alemannic Bernese German spoken in Bern and the northern parts of the canton.

In the short-lived Helvetic Republic (1798–1803), the Bernese Oberland was a separate canton.

== History ==
Prehistorically the Bernese Oberland was crossed by hunters or traders, but the first known settlements were from the Roman era. The Romans settled along the river and the lakes. They used a number of alpine passes including; the Brünig, Susten (with a Roman mansio), Grimsel, Lötschen, Gemmi, Rawil, Sanetsch and the Col du Pillon.

During the High Middle Ages, a number of Bernese Oberland villages grew around valley parish churches which were religious and cultural centers within each surrounding valley. During the Middle Ages, the Bernese Oberland first belonged to the Kingdom of Burgundy followed by the Dukes of Zähringen. After the extinction of the Zähringen line, the Bernese Oberland was ruled by a number of local Barons (including Oberhofen, Strättligen, Brienz-Ringgenberg, Wädenswil, Weissenburg). For a time, some of the Walser barons (Raron, vom Turn) ruled portions of the Bernese Oberland. The Saanen valley was ruled by the Counts of Gruyères. Portions of the alpine passes were held, until the 19th century, by the Bishop of Sion.

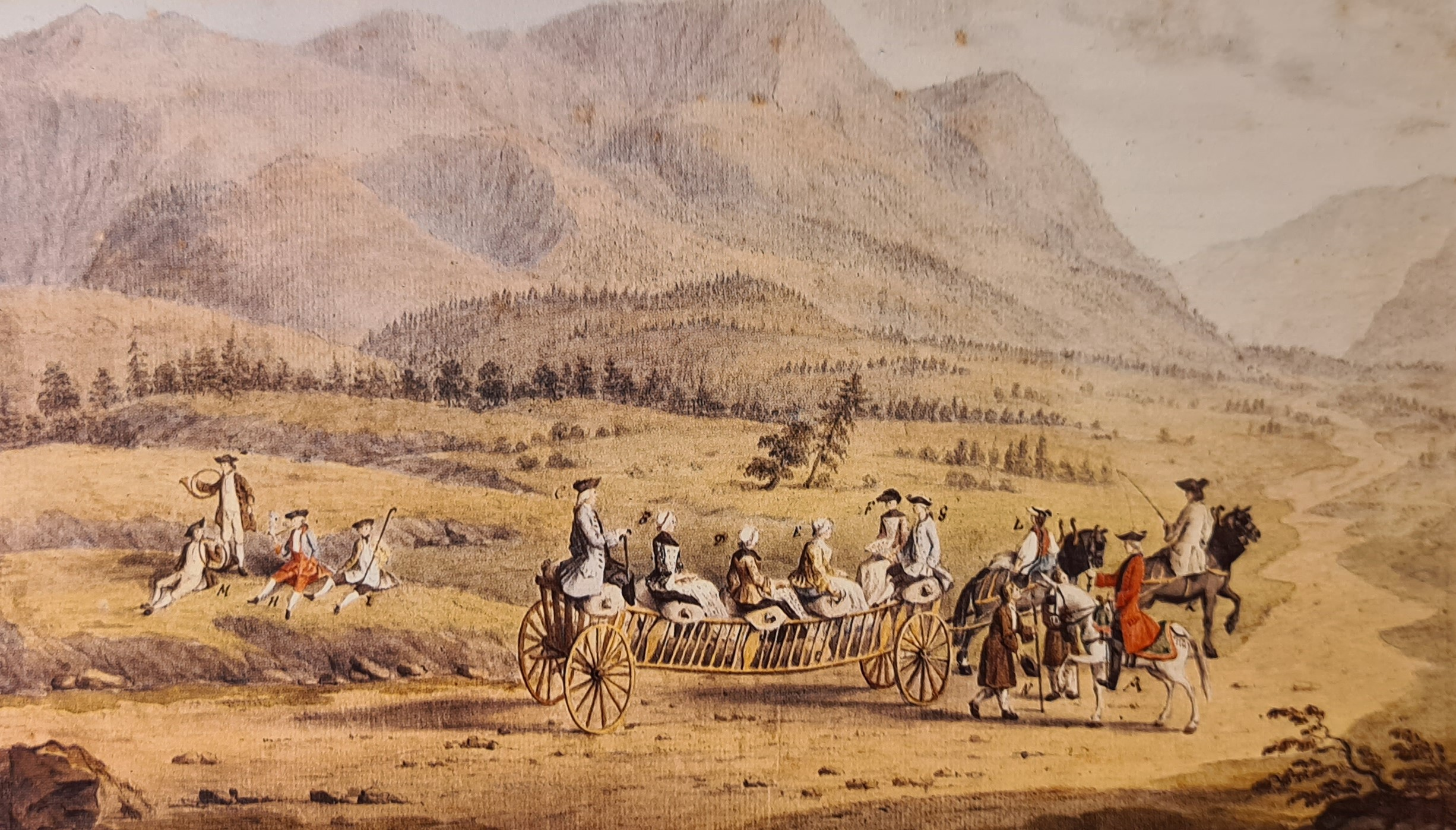
A Bernese bailiff on a visit to Grindelwald in 1760

The expansionist policy of the city of Bern led them into the Bernese Oberland. Through conquest, purchase, mortgage or marriage politics Bern was able to acquire the majority of the Bernese Oberland from the indebted local barons between 1323 and 1400. Under Bernese control, the five valleys enjoyed extensive rights and far-reaching autonomy in the Bäuerten (farming cooperative municipalities) and Talverbänden (rural alpine communities). Throughout the Late Middle Ages, the Bernese Oberland, as a whole or in part, revolted several times against Bernese authority. The Evil League (Böser Bund) in 1445 fought against Bernese military service and taxes following the Old Zürich War, in 1528 the Bernese Oberland rose up in resistance to the Protestant Reformation and in 1641 Thun revolted.

During the Middle Ages, the settlement pattern in the Bernese Oberland was somewhat consistent. A main settlement grew on the valley floor below an elevation near 1,100 m (3,600 ft). This main settlement had a market and often a castle or other fortifications. This market town was surrounded by scattered villages, hamlets and individual farm houses to an elevation of 1,600 m (5,200 ft). During the 14th–16th centuries, the Bernese Oberland villages began extensive trading with the Bernese grain producing towns in the lowlands. This allowed the alpine villages to renounce self-sufficiency in grain and focus on raising cattle in the high alpine pastures and bringing them down into the valleys in the winter (transhumance). They then exported cattle over the passes into Italy and into the Bernese lowlands. Around 1500, in addition to the seven medieval markets, eleven new cattle markets opened to allow the Bernese Oberland villagers to sell their cattle.

After the French invasion of Switzerland in 1798, the old Bernese order was fractured and the Bernese Oberland was separated from the canton of Bern, forming the canton of Oberland. Within this new canton, historic borders and traditional rights were not considered. As there had been no previous separatist feeling amongst the conservative population, there was little enthusiasm for the new order.

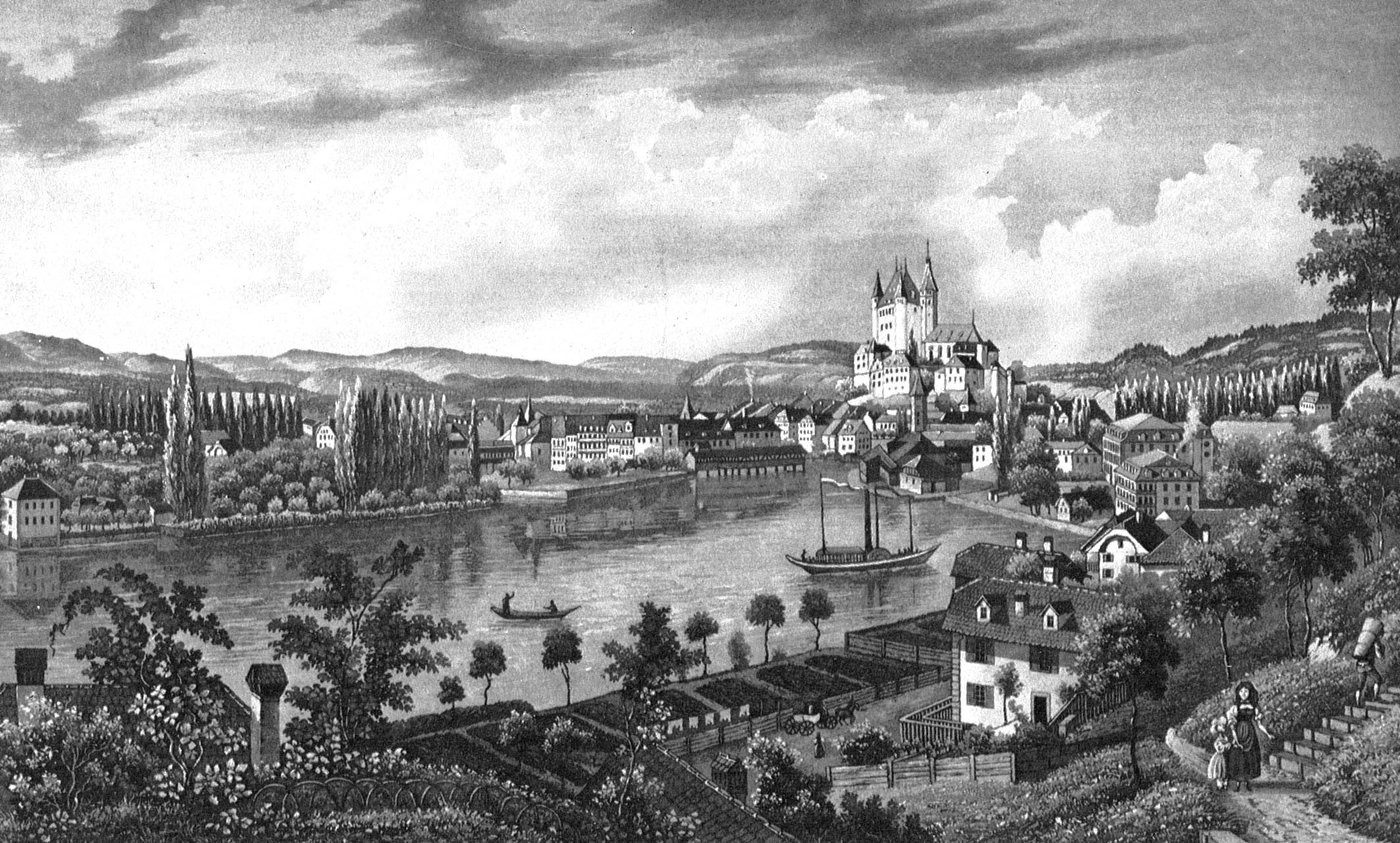
A 1830 view of Thun

The 1801 Malmaison Constitution proposed reuniting the canton of Oberland with Bern, but it was not until the Act of Mediation, two years later, with the abolition of the Helvetic Republic and the partial restoration of the ancien régime, that the two cantons were reunited.

In 1729, Albrecht von Haller published the poem Die Alpen about his travels through the alpine regions. This combined with other reports and alpine paintings started the tourism industry in the Bernese Oberland. By 1800 there were resorts on Lake Thun and Lake Brienz (especially at Interlaken between the two lakes). Shortly thereafter the resorts expanded into the alpine valleys (Lauterbrunnen, Grindelwald), and began attracting English guests. However, because of the widespread poverty of the 19th century many residents of the Simmen valley and the Interlaken district emigrated to North America, Germany or Russia.

In the late 19th century, new transportation links made it easier for people to travel into the valleys. The Bern-Lötschberg-Simplon railway opened in 1913 and became the largest privately owned railroad in Switzerland. The collapse of the hotel industry during both world wars forced a diversification of the economy. After 1950 a new wave of hotel construction of hotels and holiday homes and apartments, led to a strong population growth. Starting in the 1930s and increasingly after 1950 funiculars, cable cars and chair lifts opened up many of the high alpine villages for winter sports and tourism.

== Geography ==
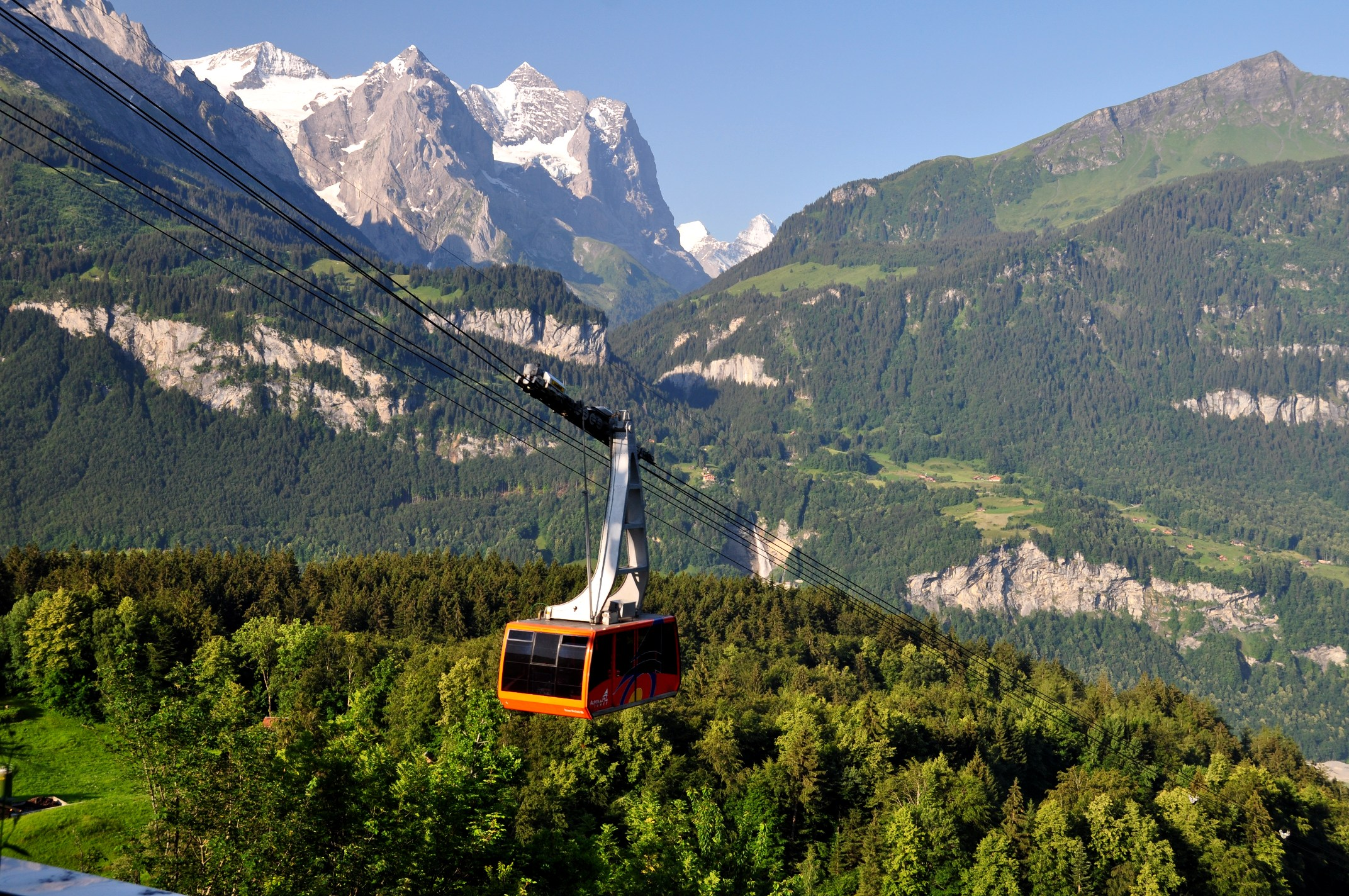
The Haslital region with the Wetterhorn in background

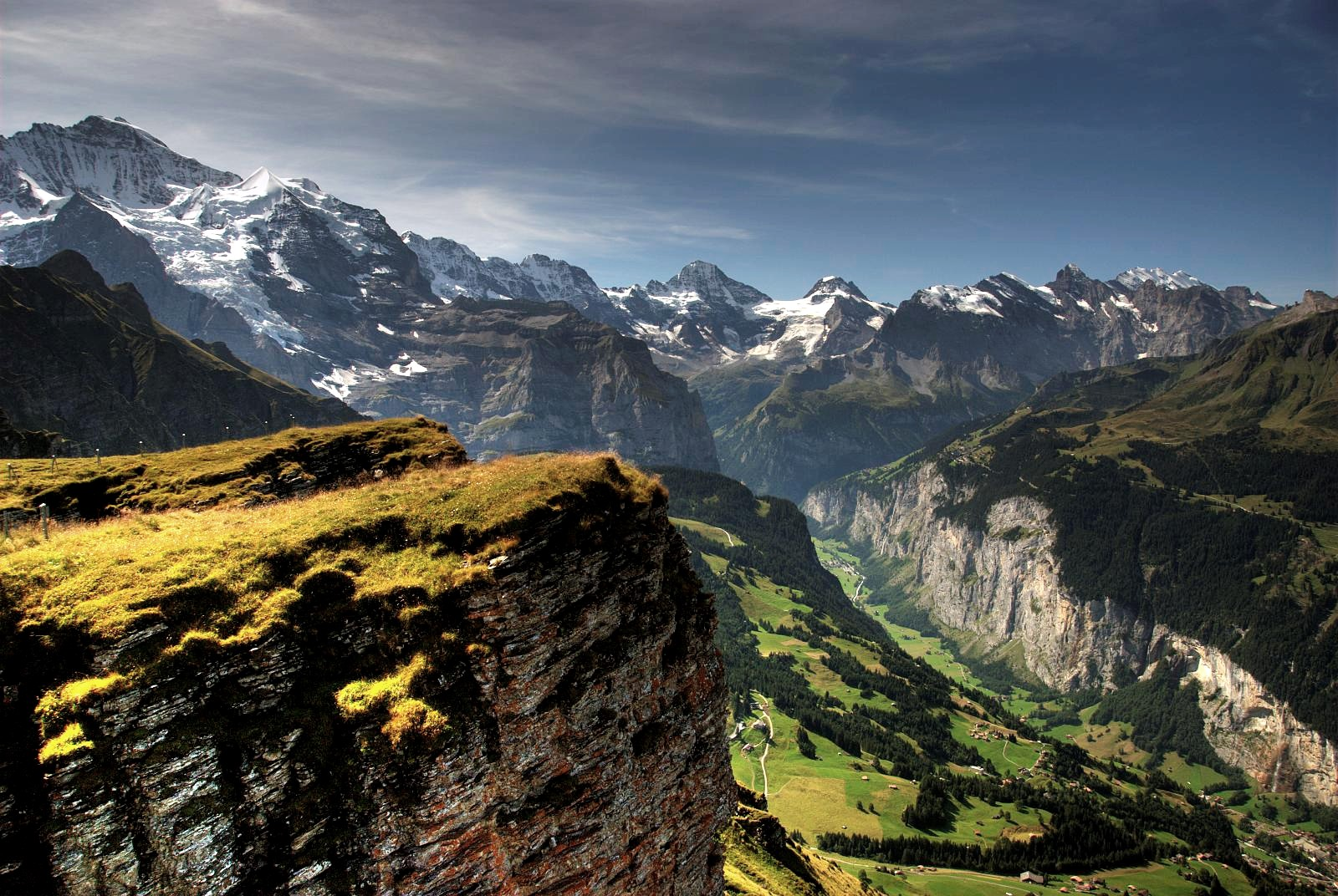
Valley of Lauterbrunnen overlooked by the Jungfrau

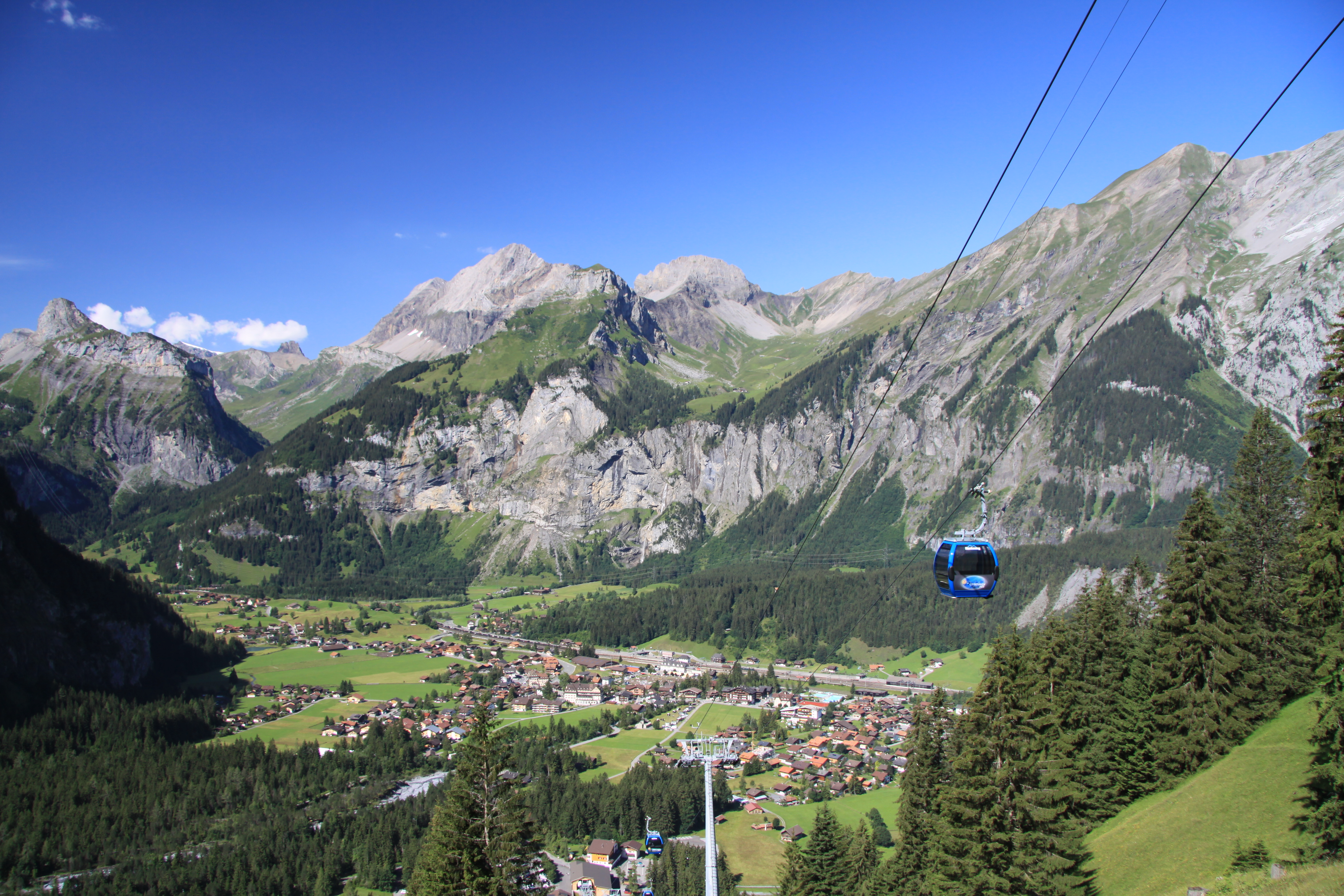
Valley of Kandersteg

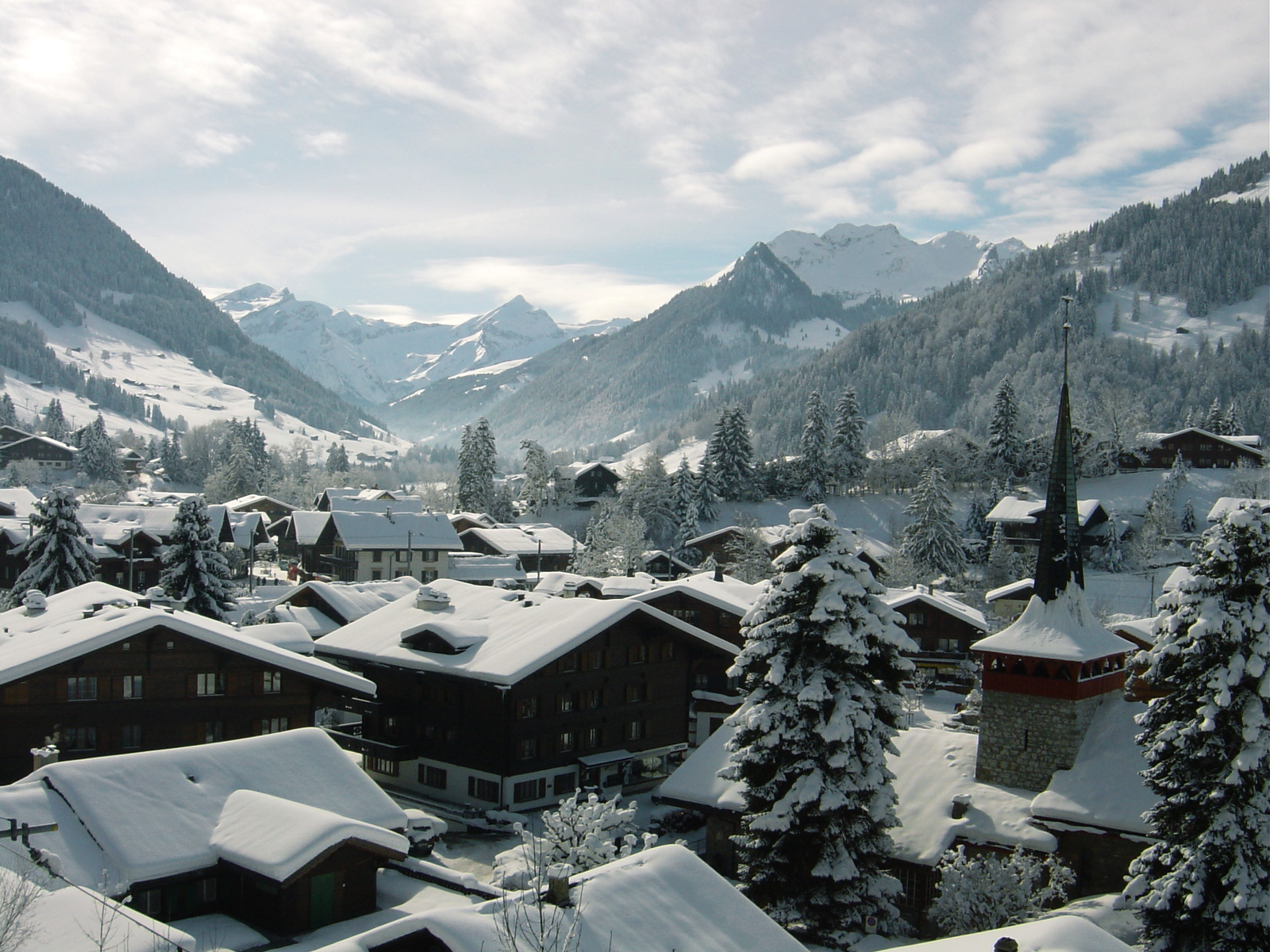
Valley of Gstaad in winter

The Bernese Oberland designates primarily an area around the upper valley of the Aare with its many larger and smaller side-valleys. It makes up the northern side the Bernese Alps and includes most of its highest peaks: Finsteraarhorn (4,274 m (14,022 ft)), Jungfrau (4,158 m (13,642 ft)), Mönch (4,110 m (13,480 ft)), Schreckhorn (4,078 m (13,379 ft)), Gross Fiescherhorn (4,049 m (13,284 ft)) and Lauteraarhorn (4,042 m (13,261 ft)). Other lower ranges partially in the Bernese Oberland are the Uri Alps (east) and the Emmental Alps (north).

Its largest part and the Alpine part of the Aare before the river enters Lake Brienz is called the Haslital culminating on the Grimsel Pass at its southeastern corner connecting with the Goms in the Upper Valais, and Andermatt in canton of Uri (UR) via the Furka Pass. And its major side-valley, called the Gadmertal, on its most eastern point culminates at the Susten Pass just south of the Titlis (OW) connecting with the valley of the Alpine Reuss (UR), the northern part of the St. Gotthard Route. The Joch Pass to the northeast at the beginning of the Gental, a foot pass west of the Titlis connecting to the canton of Nidwalden (NW) and further down to the resort Engelberg in the canton of Obwalden (OW). North and above of Meiringen is the ski and hiking resort Hasliberg just on the other side of the ski resort Melchsee-Frutt (OW). The low Brünig Pass to the north connects Meiringen and the Haslital with the upper canton of Obwalden and further down to Central Switzerland and Lucerne (LU).

Above of Brienz on the northeastern shore of Lake Brienz soars the Brienzer Rothorn, the highest summit of the 30-kilometre-long (19 mi) prominent mountain range dominating the north shore of the Lake Brienz as far as its western end above Interlaken with the Harder. The easternmost section of the ridge constitutes the border with the canton of Lucerne (LU), but the western part is fully in Bernese territory. The region of Habkern, north of the Harder, is one of the few valleys on the right side of the Aare.

South of Interlaken the short valley of the Lütschine opens to the most well-known valleys of the Bernese Oberland, namely the Lauterbrunnental to the south, and the valley of the Schwarze Lütschine to the east with Grindelwald situated just below the Eiger, Schreckhorn, and Wetterhorn. Grindelwald and Lauterbrunnen are separated by the Kleine Scheidegg pass, which is accessible from both sides via a rack railway, and which is the starting point of the Jungfrau Railway to the Jungfraujoch, a saddle between the Jungfrau and Mönch (literally, German Joch translates to yoke).

On the southeastern side of the mountain range formed by Eiger, Mönch and Jungfrau lies the head of the largest glacier of the Alps, the Aletsch Glacier, which however entirely lies on the soil of the canton of Valais (VS). Via the upper, southern end of the Lauterbrunnental the experienced hiker can reach the Kandertal by traversing the Tschingel and Kander Neve from northeast to southwest. West of the Lauterbrunnental the Schilthorn rises, separating the valley of the Weisse Lütschine from the Kiental. The Lauterbrunnen Valley is connected to the Kiental via the Sefinafurgga, a high Alpine hiking pass, and further to the Kander Valley via the Hohtürli, another high Alpine hiking pass, on the north flank of the Blümlisalp range.

Kandersteg, at the north entrance of the old Lötschberg Tunnel (1913, 14 km), which connects the Bernese Oberland with the German-speaking part of the Valais, opens up to the north to Frutigen where it is joined by the Entschligetal from the southwest, with the ski resort of Adelboden at its southern end. Adelboden and its sister resort Lenk join their respective areas to an extended and unified ski and hiking area across another mountain range. Lenk is situated at the southern end of the Obersimmental, the upper part of the Simmental, which again joins the Kander of the Kandertal just south of Spiez at the southern shore of Lake Thun after the Kander flows through the Frutigtal. Above Spiez rises the Niesen, offering a wide view over the Bernese part of the Swiss Plateau to the northwest.

Zweisimmen, still part of the Obersimmental, lies 8 kilometres (5.0 mi) south of Boltigen, the junction of the upper and lower parts of the Simmental. From Erlenbach in the Niedersimmental, the lower valley of the Simme, one can access the Stockhorn by cable cars to the west, the one summit of the Bernese Oberland with the probably most unobstructive view over the Bernese Lowlands and Thun. Not far from Erlenbach, one can access the Diemtigtal to the south with the Gsür to its very south end, also rising directly above Adelboden.

Zweisimmen also connects to Saanen and Gstaad via the small pass of Saanenmöser, with the Louwene Valley and the upper valley of the Saane south of Gstaad. After flowing northwards, in Saanen the Saane turns to the west, firstly, in order to become La Sarine in the now French-speaking canton of Vaud (VD), and secondly, opens a railway connection to Montreux at the eastern shore of Lake Geneva.

The Jaun Pass, a road pass, connects the Simmental near Reidenbach with La Gruyère, the valley when La Sarine turns north again, and the town of Bulle in the canton of Fribourg (FR), west of the Lac de la Gruyère.

North of Spiez, right across Lake Thun, on its northern shore, lies the Niederhorn, the south end of the northernmost mountain range of significant elevation of the Bernese Oberland, with the Gemmenalphorn and the Hohgant at the other end, separated by a small valley from the Harder on its southeast.

At the west end of Lake Thun, at the outlet of the river Aare, lies the town of Thun, which already belongs to the Swiss Plateau, not far from Bern to the northwest.

== Administrative division ==
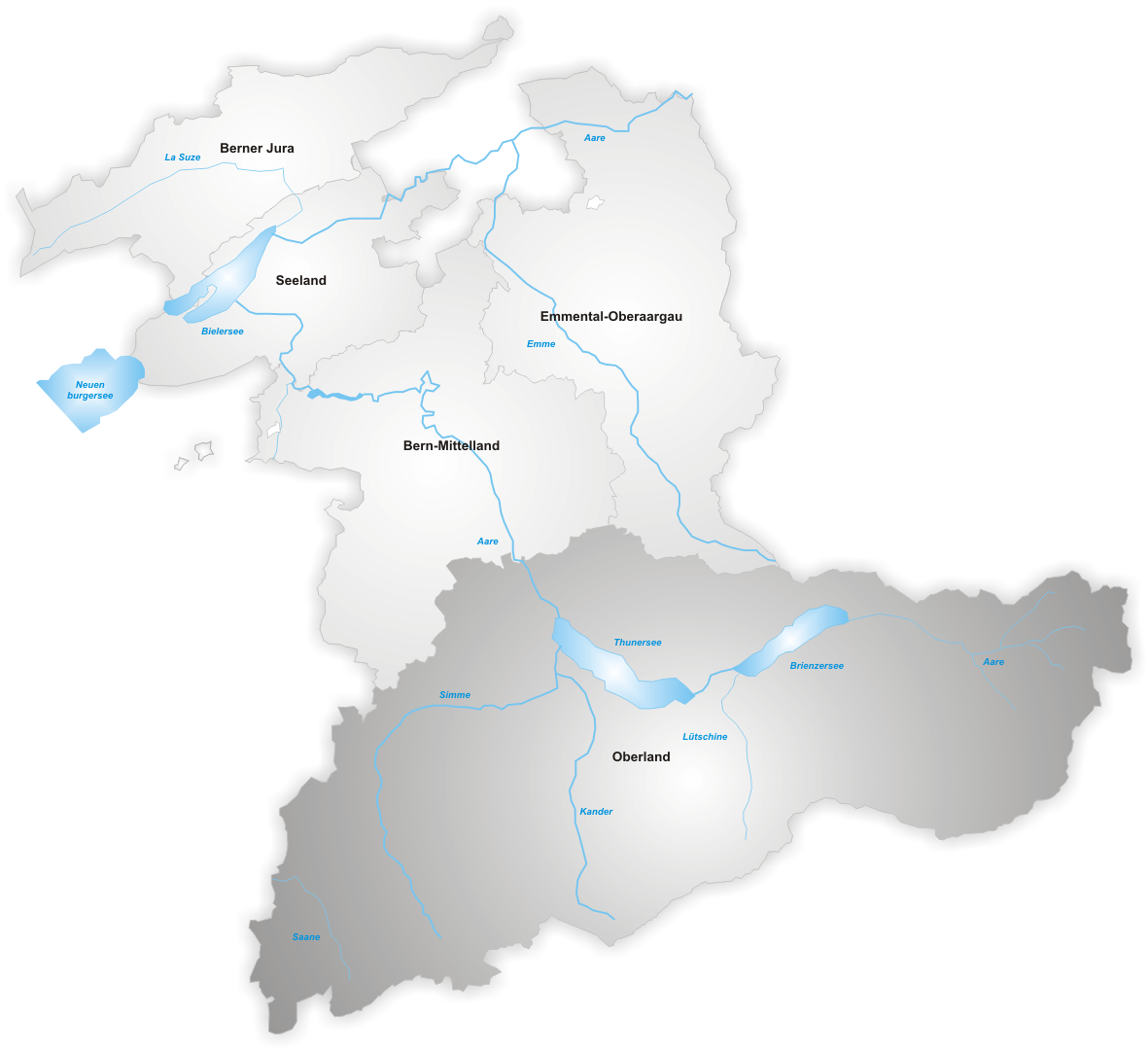
Location of the Oberland administrative region in the Canton of Bern

The flag of the Bernese Oberland

The coat of arms of the Bernese Oberland

Since 2010, the Bernese Oberland covers one of five administrative regions of the canton of Bern (called German: Verwaltungsregion Oberland) and consists of four administrative districts with 80 municipalities:

- Frutigen-Niedersimmental (administrative district)
- Interlaken-Oberhasli (administrative district)
- Obersimmental-Saanen (administrative district)
- Thun (administrative district)

Before 2010, the Oberland had consisted of the following districts:

- Thun (district)
- Interlaken (district)
- Oberhasli (district)
- Frutigen (district)
- Obersimmental (district)
- Niedersimmental (district)
- Saanen (district)

== Tourism ==
The Bernese Oberland is well known for touristic reasons, including the following destinations:

- Gstaad-Saanenland
- Lenk/Simmental
- Adelboden-Frutigen
- Lake Thun
- Lötschberg area
- Interlaken
- Wengen/Mürren/Lauterbrunnental
- Grindelwald
- Haslital

== See also ==
- Swiss Alps
- Bernese Alps
- The Friend of God from the Oberland
