= Canton of Oberland =

Canton of the Helvetic Republic

Coordinates: 46°42′N 7°40′E

Canton of Oberland Kanton Oberland
- Canton of the Helvetic Republic
- 1798–1803
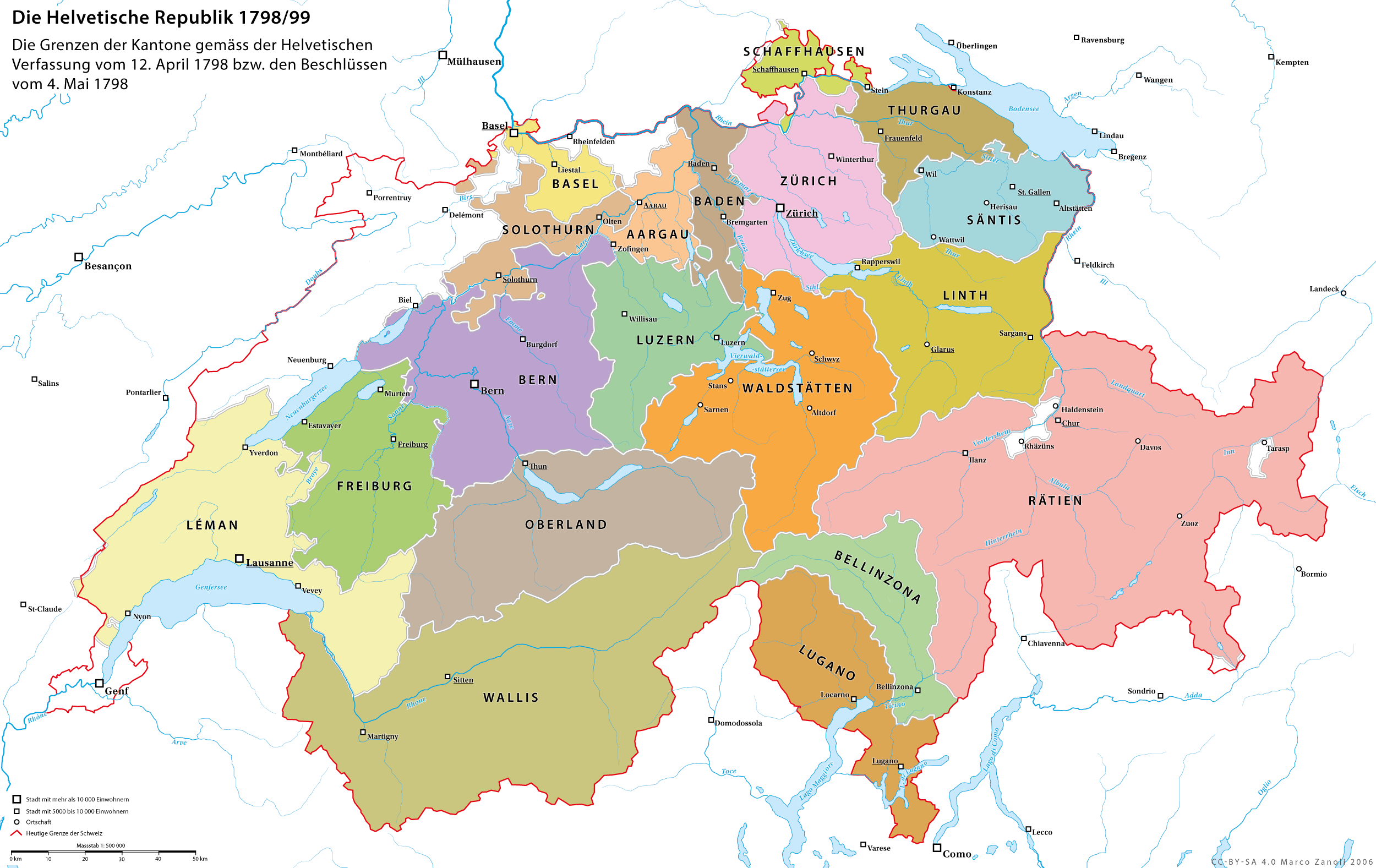
- The Helvetic Republic, as at the constitution of 12 April 1798, showing the canton of Oberland in brown. The Canton of Bern (purple) is directly north of Oberland and the Canton of Wallis (olive) is south.
- Capital: Thun
- History
  - Helv. Rep. proclaimed: 12 April 1798
  - Helv. Rep. disestablished: 19 February
| Preceded by | Succeeded by |
| Bern / Canton of Bern | Canton of Bern / Bern |
- Today part of: Switzerland

Oberland (Swiss Standard German pronunciation: [ˈoːbərlant], "Highlands") was the name of a canton of the Helvetic Republic (1798–1803), corresponding to the area of the Bernese Oberland, with its capital at Thun.

== History ==
After the French invasion of Switzerland in 1798, the old Bernese order was broken up and the Oberland separated from the rest of the canton. Within the new canton, historic borders and traditional rights were not considered. As there had been no previous separatist feeling amongst the conservative population, there was little enthusiasm for the new order.

The 1801 Malmaison Constitution proposed reuniting the Oberland with Bern, but it was not until the Act of Mediation, two years later, with the abolition of the Helvetic Republic and the partial restoration of the ancien régime, that the two cantons were reunited.

== Districts ==
During its short-lived existence, the canton was administered in ten districts, each named for the district seat, except where shown:

- Aeschi
- Brienz
- Frutigen
- Interlaken (district seat: Wilderswil)
- Oberhasli (Meiringen)
- Saanen
- Upper Simmental (Zweisimmen)
- Lower Simmental (Erlenbach)
- Thun
- Unterseen
