= Saanen (disambiguation) =

Saanen is a municipality in the canton of Berne in Switzerland.

Saanen may also refer to:

- Saanen District, a former administrative district in the canton of Bern, Switzerland
- Saanen goat, a domesticated breed of dairy goat

== See also ==
- Sarnen
