= Emmental (valley) =

Valley in Switzerland

Coordinates: 46.98494°N 7.76321°E

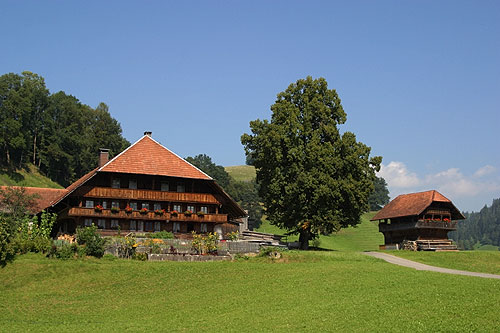
A farmhouse in the Emmental

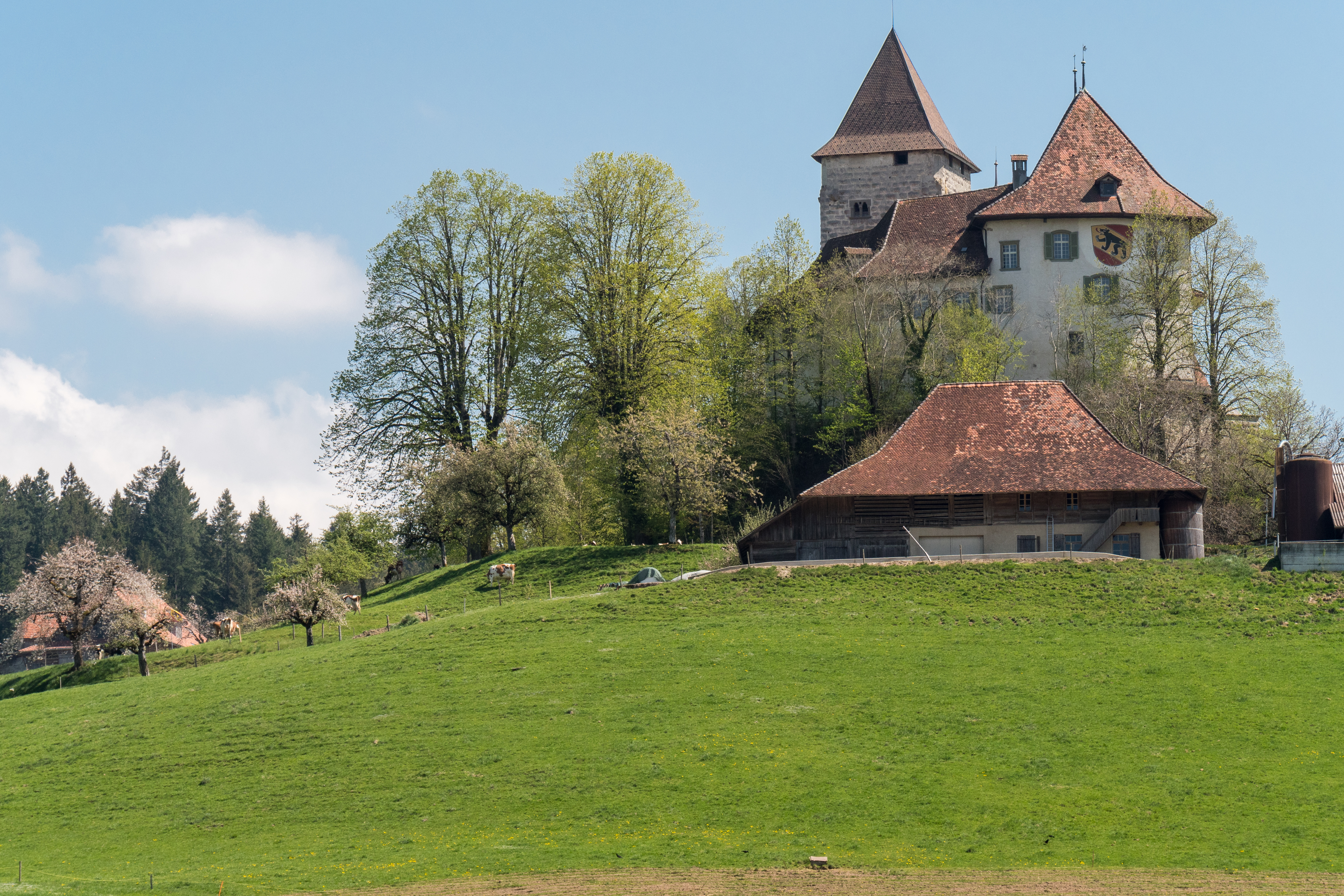
Trachselwald Castle

The Emmental (German pronunciation: [ˈɛməntaːl], English: Emme Valley) is a valley in west-central Switzerland, forming part of the canton of Bern. It is a hilly landscape comprising the basins of the rivers Emme and Ilfis. The region is mostly devoted to farming, particularly dairy farming. The principal settlements are the town of Burgdorf and the village of Langnau.

Comprising Burgdorf, Trachselwald, and Signau districts in the canton of Bern, the Emmental became part of the Emmental-Oberaargau administrative region on 1 January 2010. The district of Fraubrunnen is divided between Emmental and Bern-Mittelland.

== Geography ==
The region comprises relatively low mountains on the right bank of the Aare. It includes the basins of the Emme and the Ilfis between Burgdorf and the boundary with the canton of Solothurn. Its principal elevation is the Napf, a mountain massif dominating the northwestern part of the Emmental Alps.

The landscape is dominated by meadows and pastureland, with forest interspersed.

== Economy ==
The original Emmental cheese is produced there, and the dairy industry still dominates the local economy. Pottery from the region is also prized, and the ceramics of the region have endured practically unchanged since the 17th century.

Tourism has had less impact on the region than on other parts of Switzerland.

== Culture ==
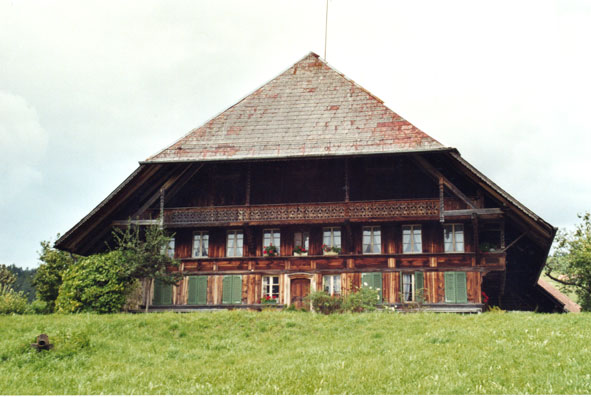
Emmental farmhouse

The novelist Jeremias Gotthelf (1797–1854) was a pastor in the Emmental and wrote about the region.

The Emmental also played a dominant role in the history of the Mennonites.

=== Architecture ===
The typical Emmental farmhouse has a steep roof with a large overhang that almost reaches the ground.

== See also ==
- Napfgebiet
