= Hinteres Fiescherhorn =

Mountain in Switzerland

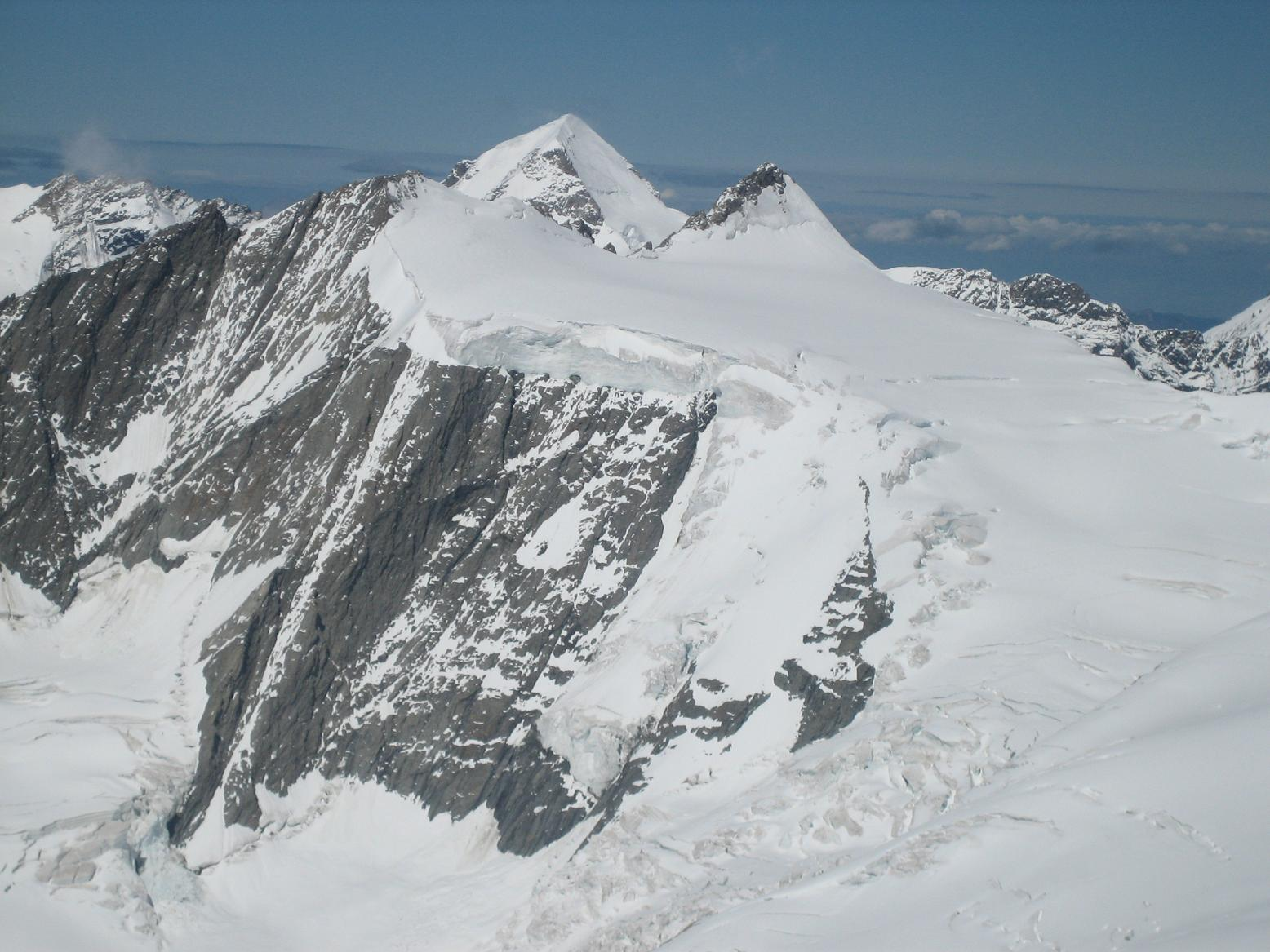
- The Hinteres Fiescherhorn (centre left) and the Grosses Fiescherhorn (centre right) with the Mönch in background. The dark tower left is pt 3981 m

Highest point
- Elevation: 4,025 m (13,205 ft)
- Prominence: 102 m (335 ft)
- Parent peak: Grosses Fiescherhorn
- Coordinates: 46°32′47″N 8°04′04″E

Naming
- English translation: Horn of Fiesch in the back
- Language of name: German

Geography
- Location within Switzerland
- Country: Switzerland
- Canton: Valais
- Parent range: Bernese Alps
- Topo map: swisstopo

Geology
- Mountain type: glaciated peak

Hinteres Fiescherhorn is a summit of the Bernese Alps and build together with Grosses and Kleines Fiescherhorn the Fiescherhörner. It is located in the Swiss canton of Valais near the border with the canton of Berne. The southern rock-tower pt 3,981 m (13,061 ft) is a prominent sub-peak.

== See also ==
- List of 4000 metre peaks of the Alps
