= Emmental-Oberaargau =

Coordinates: 47°02′24″N 7°43′48″E

- Region
- Interactive map of Emmental-Oberaargau

Area
  - Total: 102,124 km^{2} (39,430 sq mi)

Population
  - Total: 180,138 (December 31 2,020)

Emmental-Oberaargau is one of five administrative divisions (regions) of the canton of Bern, Switzerland. It comprises two precincts, Emmental and Oberaargau. It has a population of 168,000 (2005 estimate) in 89 municipalities, comprising 1021.32 km^{2}.
