= Seeland Region =

Coordinates: 47.137497°N 7.247238°E

Seeland Region is one of five administrative regions of the canton of Bern, with a population of 66,000 (as of 2005) in 62 municipalities (Biel-Bienne 19 and Seeland 43 municipalities).

== See also ==
- Subdivisions of the canton of Bern
- Seeland (Switzerland)
