= Kleines Fiescherhorn =

Mountain in Switzerland

- German: Ochs
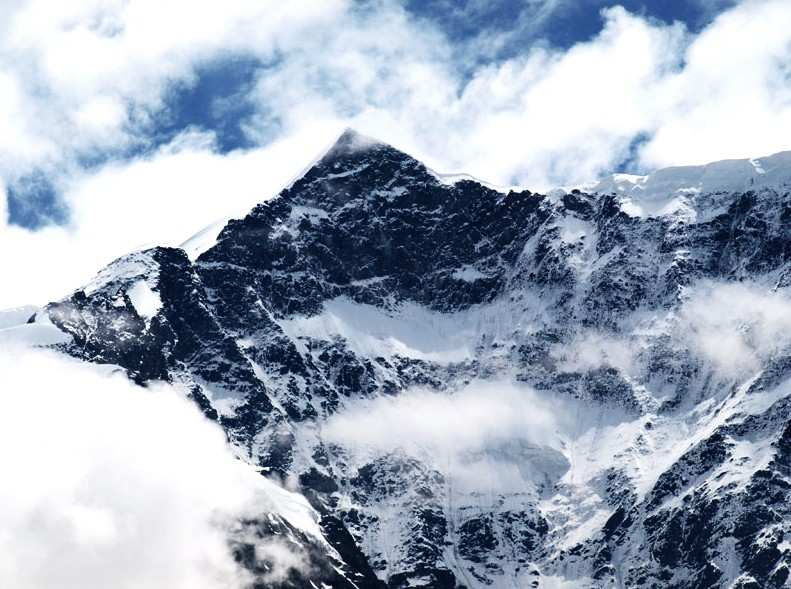
- North wall

Highest point
- Elevation: 3,895 m (12,779 ft)
- Prominence: 76 m (249 ft)
- Parent peak: Grosses Fiescherhorn
- Coordinates: 46°33′19.8″N 8°4′33.2″E

Naming
- English translation: Small Horn of Fiesch; Ox
- Language of name: German

Geography
- Location within Switzerland
- Country: Switzerland
- Cantons: Bern and Valais
- Parent range: Bernese Alps
- Topo map: swisstopo

Geology
- Mountain type: glaciated peak

Kleines Fiescherhorn or the Ochs (English: ox) is a mountain peak of the Bernese Alps, situated on the border between the cantons of Bern and Valais in Switzerland. Together with Grosses and Hinteres Fiescherhorn to the west they build the Fiescherhörner.
