= Schwarzenburg District =

Coordinates: 46°49′N 7°21′E

Schwarzenburg District Amtsbezirk Schwarzenburg
- District
- Flag Coat of arms

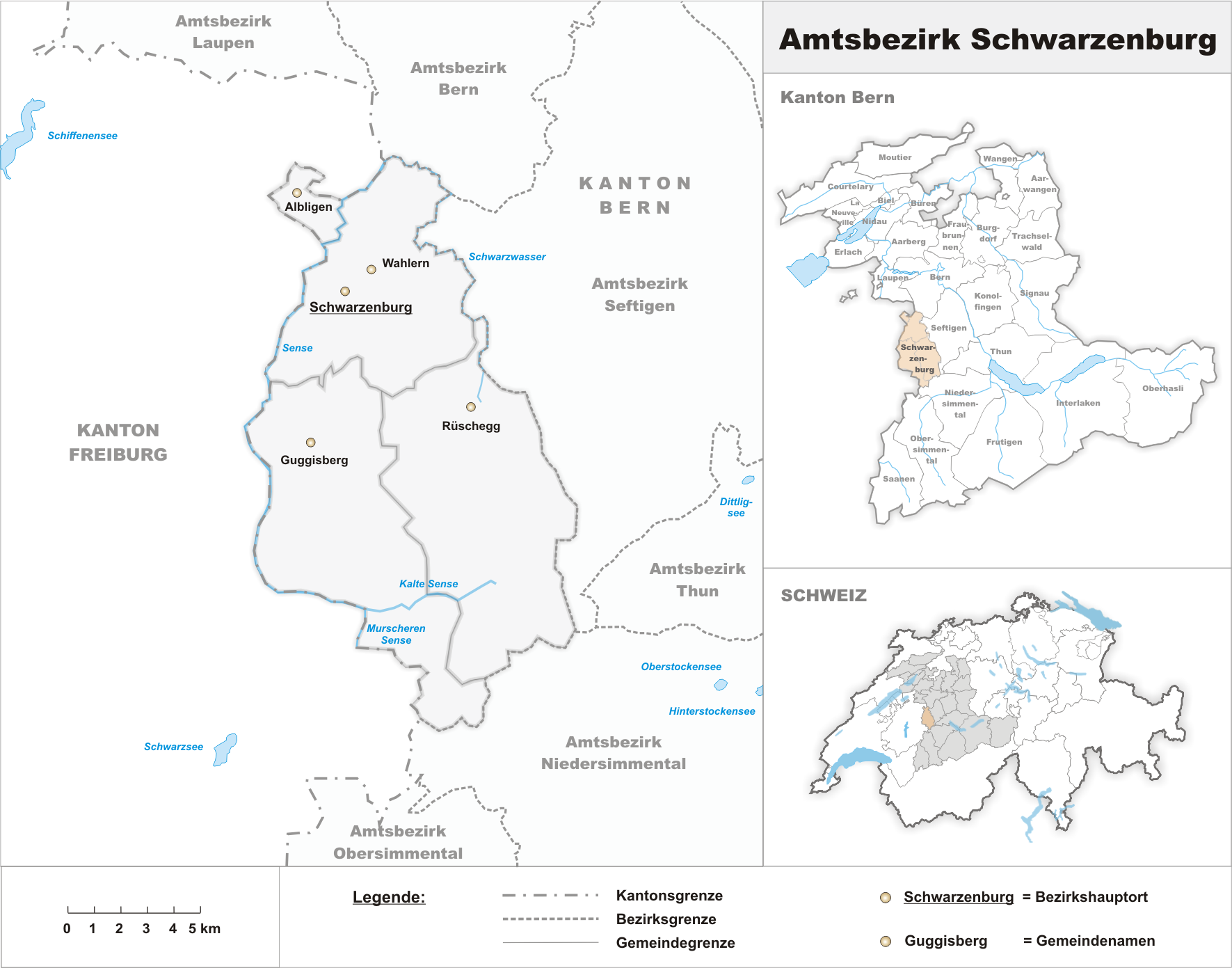
- Country: Switzerland
- Canton: Bern
- Capital: Wahlern

Area
  - Total: 157 km^{2} (61 sq mi)

Population (2007)
  - Total: 10,002
  - Density: 63.7/km^{2} (165/sq mi)
- Time zone: UTC+1 (CET)
  - Summer (DST): UTC+2 (CEST)
- Municipalities: 4

Schwarzenburg District is one of the 26 administrative districts in the Canton of Bern, Switzerland. Its capital, while having administrative power, was the town of Schwarzenburg, located in the municipality of Wahlern.

From 1 January 2010, the district lost its administrative power while being replaced by the Bern-Mittelland (administrative district), whose administrative centre is Ostermundigen.

Since 2010, it remains therefore a fully recognised district under the law and the Constitution (Art.3 al.2) of the Canton of Berne.

The district has an area of 157 km^{2} and consisted of 4 municipalities:

Municipality	Population (Dec 2007)	Area (km^{2})
Albligen	465	4.3
Guggisberg	1,602	54.9
Rüschegg	1,708	57.4
Wahlern	6,227	40.6
