= Aarberg District =

Coordinates: 47.0333°N 7.26667°E

Aarberg District Amtsbezirk Aarberg
- District
- Flag Coat of arms

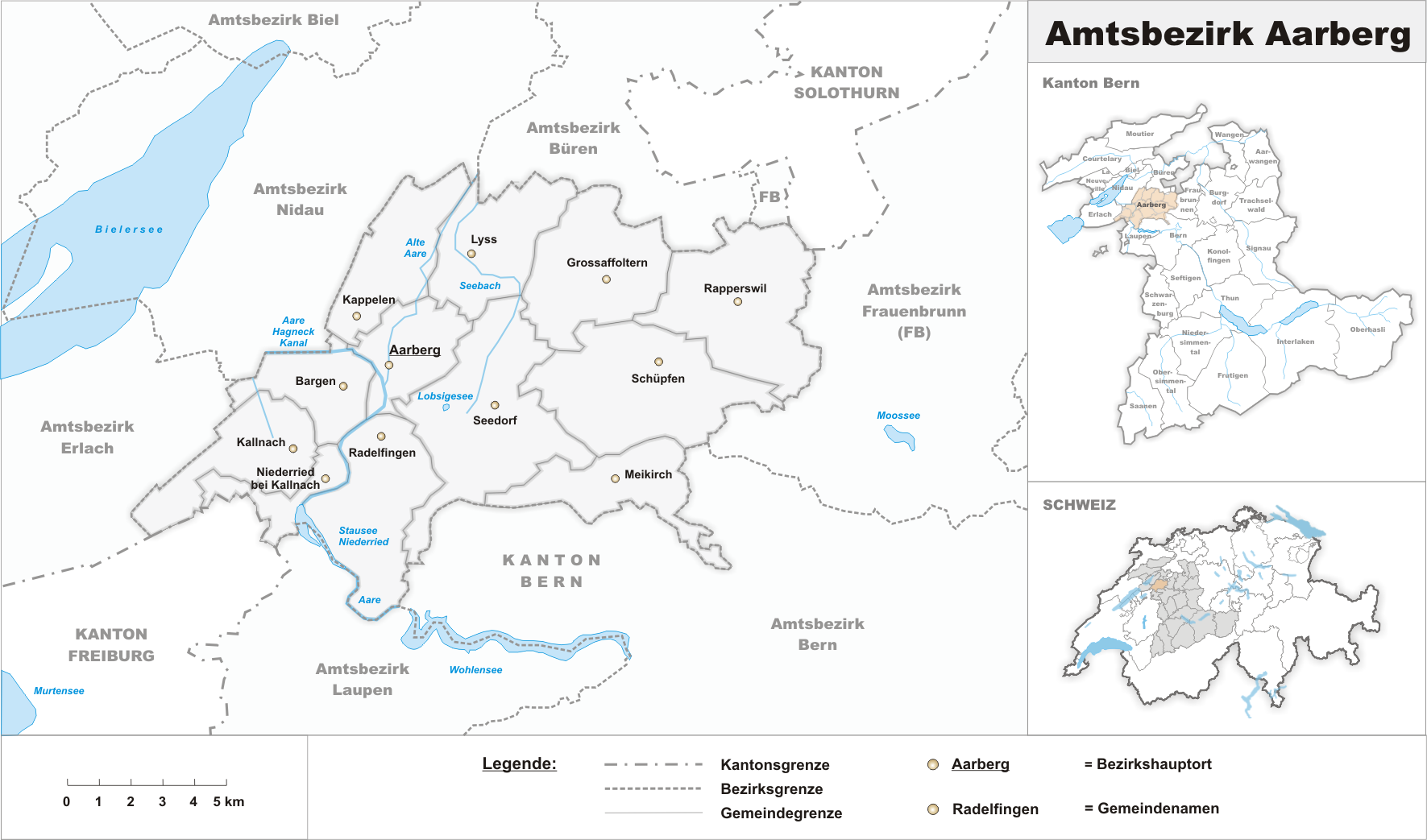
- Country: Switzerland
- Canton: Bern
- Capital: Aarberg

Area
  - Total: 153 km^{2} (59 sq mi)

Population (2007)
  - Total: 33,908
  - Density: 222/km^{2} (574/sq mi)
- Time zone: UTC+1 (CET)
  - Summer (DST): UTC+2 (CEST)
- Municipalities: 12

The Aarberg District is a constitutional district of the canton of Bern, Switzerland. While being an administrative district with power, its capital was the town of Aarberg. The district contains 12 municipalities covering an area of 153 km^{2} (59 sq mi):

- CH-3270 Aarberg
- CH-3282 Bargen
- CH-3257 Grossaffoltern
- CH-3283 Kallnach
- CH-3273 Kappelen (flag)
- CH-3250 Lyss
- CH-3045 Meikirch
- CH-3283 Niederried bei Kallnach
- CH-3271 Radelfingen
- CH-3255 Rapperswil
- CH-3054 Schüpfen
- CH-3267 Seedorf

From 1 January 2010, the district lost its administrative power while being replaced by the Seeland (administrative district), whose administrative centre is Aarberg. Since 2010, it remains a fully recognised district under the law and the Constitution (Art.3 al.2) of the Canton of Berne.
