= Grosses Fiescherhorn =

Mountain in Switzerland

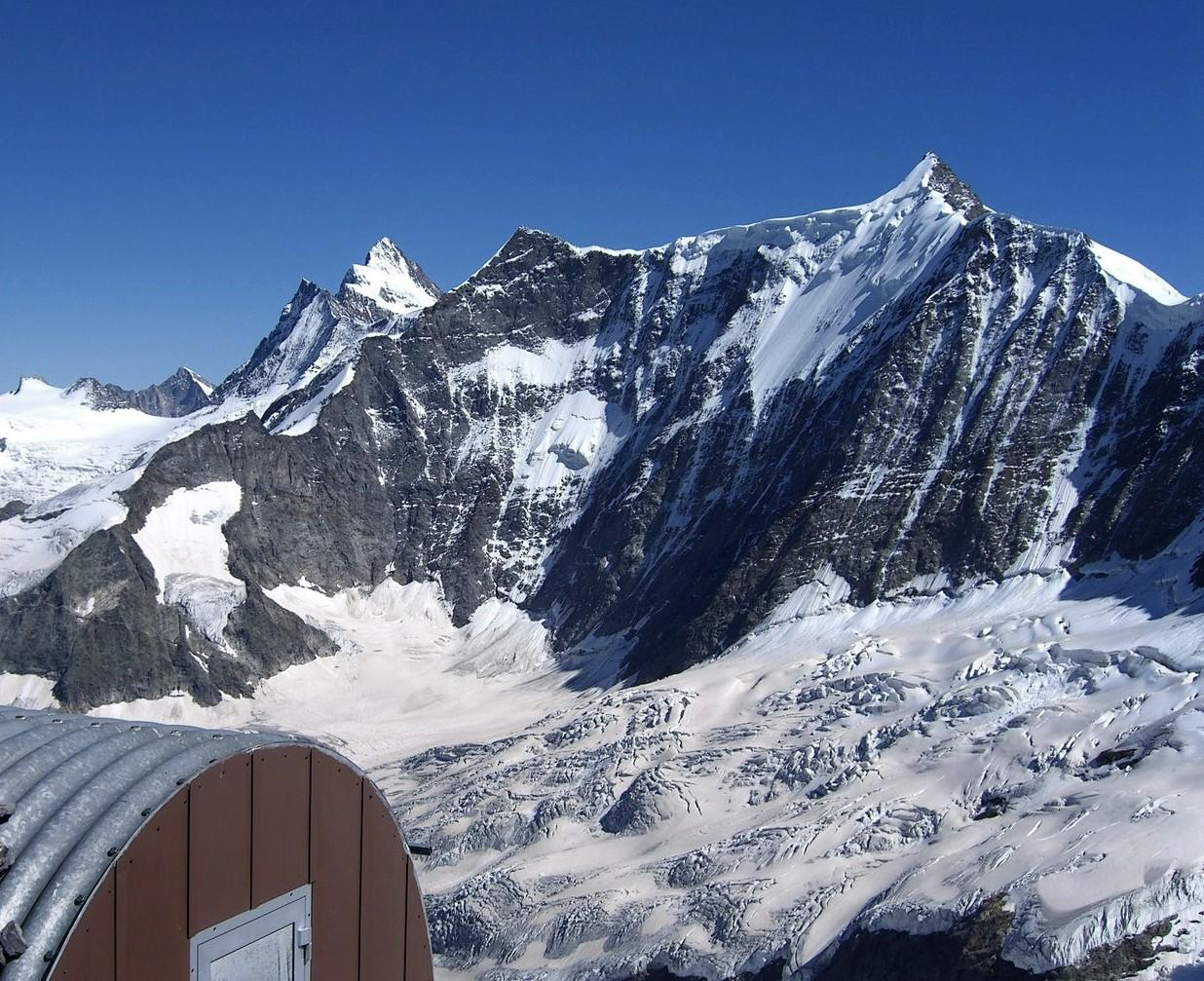
- The north face (Fiescherwand) of the Fiescherhorn (Grosses (right) and Kleines Fiescherhorn (middle), and Finsteraarhorn in the back (left))

Highest point
- Elevation: 4,049 m (13,284 ft)
- Prominence: 396 m (1,299 ft)
- Parent peak: Finsteraarhorn
- Isolation: 4.7 km (2.9 mi)
- Coordinates: 46°33′05″N 8°03′40″E

Naming
- English translation: Grand Horn of Fiesch
- Language of name: German

Geography
- Location within Switzerland
- Country: Switzerland
- Canton: Bern; Valais
- Parent range: Bernese Alps
- Topo map: swisstopo

Geology
- Mountain type: glaciated peak

Climbing
- First ascent: 23 July 1862
- Easiest route: Basic rock/snow/ice climb

Grosses Fiescherhorn is a mountain peak of the Bernese Alps, located on the border between the cantons of Bern and Valais, halfway between the Mönch and the Finsteraarhorn. At 4,049 metres (13,284 ft) above sea level, its summit culminates over the whole Fiescherhorn massif (German: Fiescherhörner), which is also composed of the slightly lower Hinteres Fiescherhorn (4,025 m (13,205 ft)) to the south and Kleines Fiescherhorn (also called Ochs a.k.a. ox, 3,895 m (12,779 ft)) to the east. From the north both are well hidden behind other mountain peaks and can only been seen from Isch in Grindelwald (1,095 m). The mountain is shared between the municipalities of Grindelwald and Fieschertal.

Ascents are usually made from one of these three popular routes: one starts from the Mönchsjoch Hut, one from the Konkordia Hut, and the third from the Finsteraarhorn Hut.

== Climbing history ==
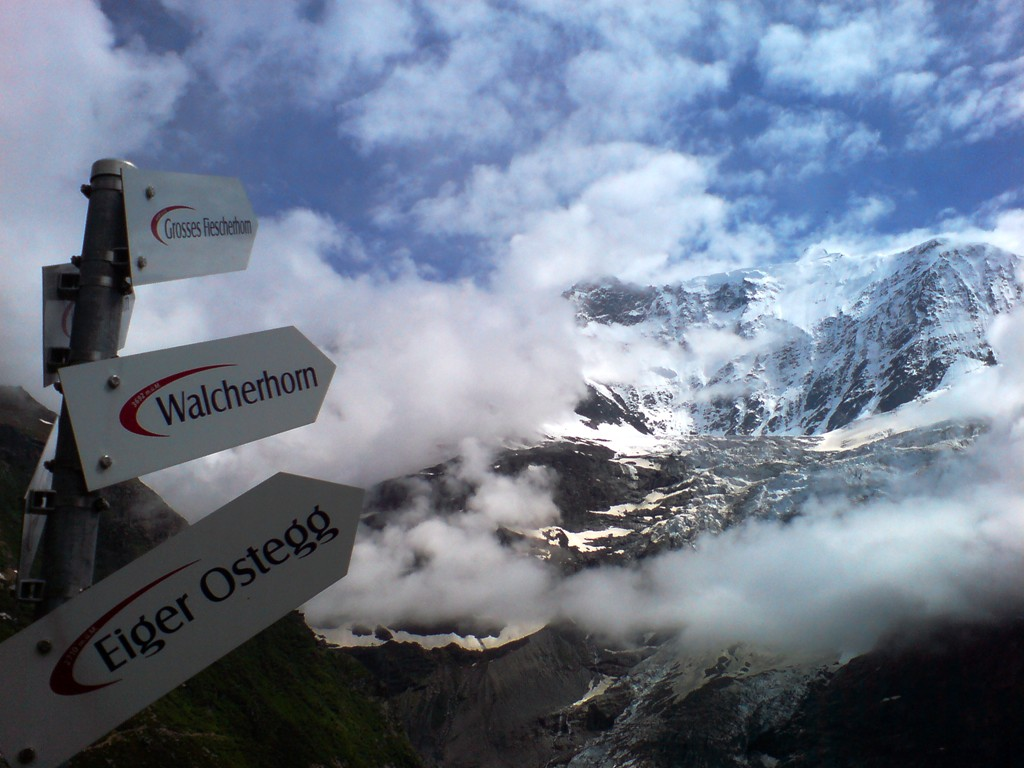
The Fiescherwand from Bäregg

The summit was first reached on 23 July 1862 by H. B. George and Adolphus Warburton Moore, with guides Christian Almer and Ulrich Kaufmann. They used what is now the normal route, the south-west ridge.

The north side of the mountain was first climbed in 1926. On 13 August, W. Amstutz and P. von Schumacher reached the summit after a 15-hour ascent via the north ridge, which is the northern boundary of the Fiescherwand.

The first direct ascent on the Fiescherwand was made by Willo Welzenbach and Heinz Tillmann in 1930. Welzenbach was an expert climber, who disputed the common idea of his time that an ascent of the Fiescherwand was impossible. The previous year, in 1929, Welzenbach and Tillmann climbed the north ridge in only 8.5 hours. The following year they started the ascent of the Fiescherwand on the morning of 5 September 1930, taking a line that ran directly to the summit. They reached the top that evening, after a 12-hour ascent.

== See also ==
- List of 4000 metre peaks of the Alps
