= Gemmenalphorn =

Mountain in Switzerland

- Location within Switzerland

Highest point
- Elevation: 2,061 m (6,762 ft)
- Prominence: 81 m (266 ft)
- Parent peak: Burgfeldstand
- Coordinates: 46°43′53.3″N 7°48′23.9″E

Geography
- Location: Bern, Switzerland
- Parent range: Emmental Alps

The Gemmenalphorn is a mountain in the Emmental Alps. It lies north-east of Niederhorn, near Beatenberg
