= Bern District =

Coordinates: 47°00′N 7°35′E

Bern District Amtsbezirk Bern District de Berne Distretto di Berna
- District
- Flag Coat of arms

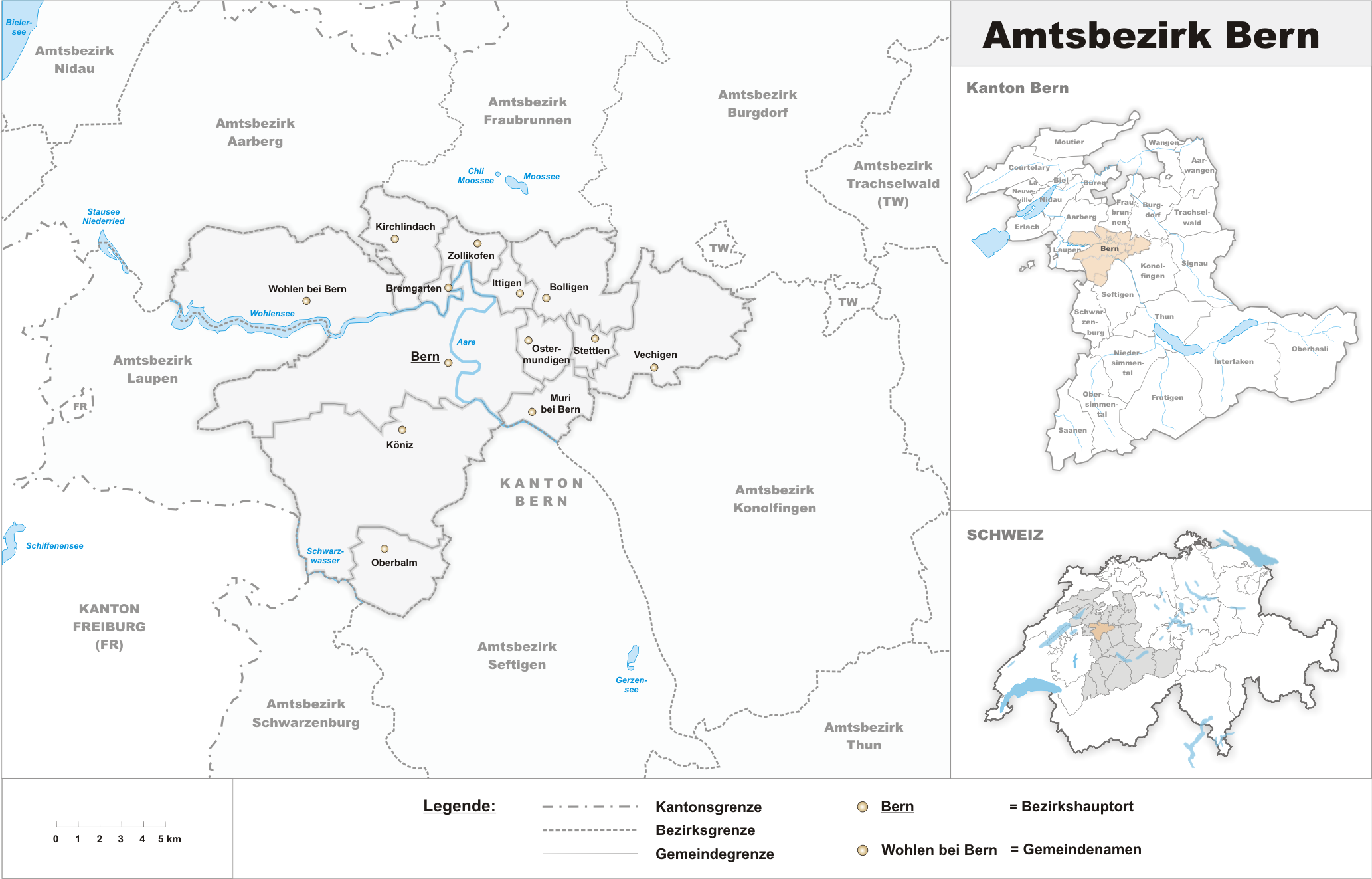
- Country: Switzerland
- Canton: Bern
- Capital: Bern

Area
  - Total: 234 km^{2} (90 sq mi)

Population (2007)
  - Total: 238,069
  - Density: 1,020/km^{2} (2,640/sq mi)
- Time zone: UTC+1 (CET)
  - Summer (DST): UTC+2 (CEST)
- Municipalities: 13

Bern District (German: Amtsbezirk Bern, French: District de Berne, Italian: Distretto di Berna) is a constitutional district and used to be an administrative district in the canton of Bern, Switzerland. It had an area of 233 km^{2} (90 sq mi) and a population of 237,919 (in January 2005).

From 1 January 2010, the district lost its administrative power while being replaced by the Bern-Mittelland (administrative district), whose administrative centre is Ostermundigen. Since 2010, it remains a fully recognised district under the law and the Constitution (Art.3 al.2) of the Canton of Berne.

Its capital was the city of Bern, which contains around half the population. The district consists of thirteen municipalities:

| Municipality | Population (Jan 2005) | Area (km²) |
|---|---|---|
| Bern | 122,304 | 51.6 |
| Bolligen | 6,142 | 16.6 |
| Bremgarten bei Bern | 3,818 | 1.9 |
| Ittigen | 10,919 | 4.2 |
| Kirchlindach | 2,586 | 11.9 |
| Köniz | 37,067 | 51.1 |
| Muri bei Bern | 12,567 | 7.7 |
| Oberbalm | 880 | 12.4 |
| Ostermundigen | 15,282 | 6.0 |
| Stettlen | 2,949 | 3.6 |
| Vechigen | 4,702 | 24.8 |
| Wohlen bei Bern | 9,155 | 36.3 |
| Zollikofen | 9,548 | 5.4 |
