= Biel District =

Biel District Amtsbezirk Biel District de Bienne
- District
- Flag Coat of arms

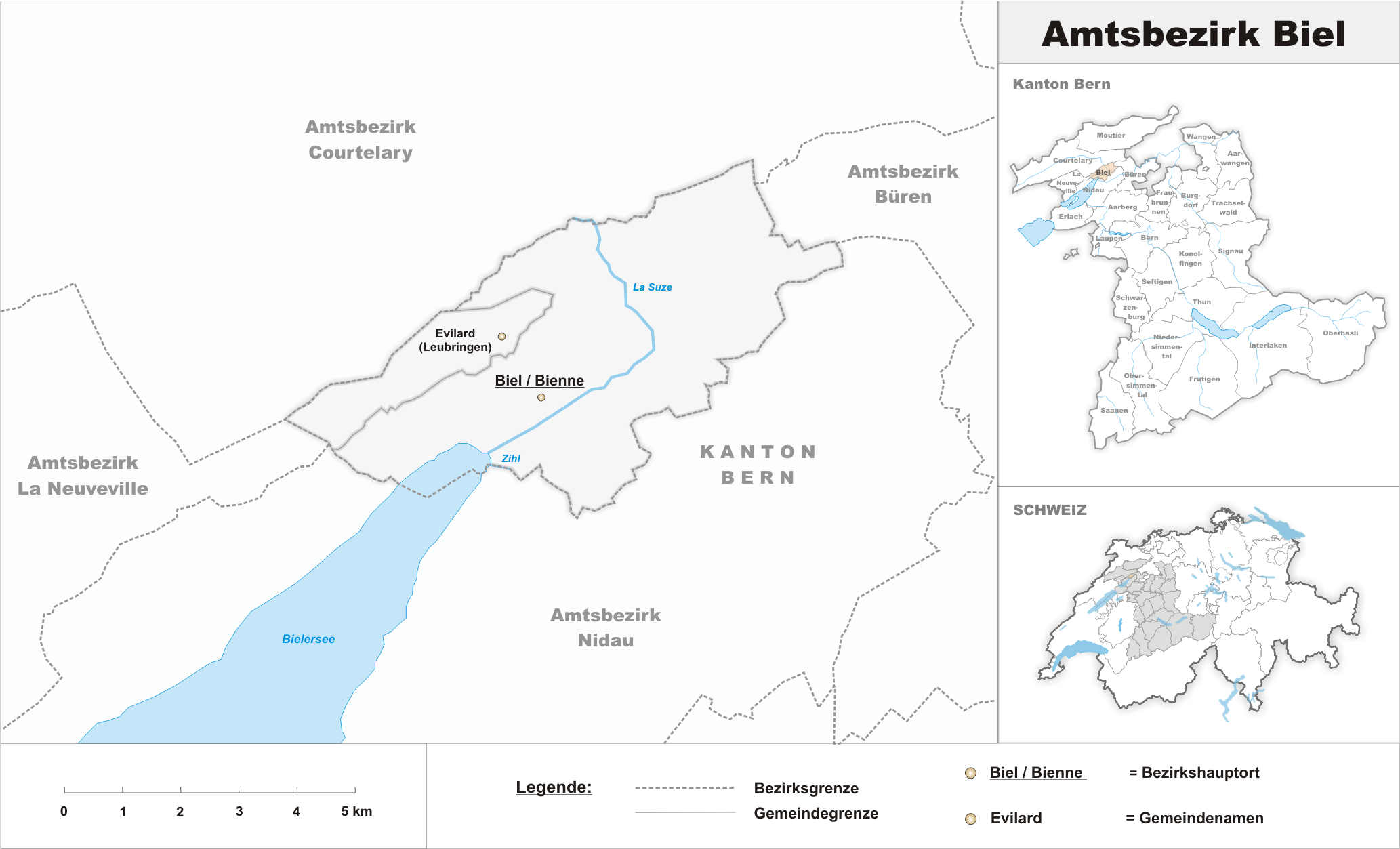
- Coordinates: 47.1333°N 7.23333°E
- Country: Switzerland
- Canton: Bern
- Capital: Biel/Bienne

Area
  - Total: 25 km^{2} (9.7 sq mi)

Population (2007)
  - Total: 51,707
  - Density: 2,100/km^{2} (5,400/sq mi)
- Time zone: UTC+1 (CET)
  - Summer (DST): UTC+2 (CEST)
- Municipalities: 2

Biel/Bienne District is a constitutional district (Amtsbezirk) in the canton of Bern in Switzerland with its seat Biel/Bienne. It is bi-lingual (41% French and 59% German) and includes two municipalities in an area of 25 km^{2}:

Municipality	Population (01.01.2005)	Area (km^{2})
Biel/Bienne	50,407	21.60
Evilard/Leubringen	2,312	3.70

From 1 January 2010, the district lost its administrative power while being replaced by the administrative district of Biel/Bienne. Since 2010, it remains a fully recognised district under the law and the Constitution (Art.3 al.2) of the canton of Bern.
