= Signau District =

Coordinates: 46°55′N 7°43′E

Signau District Amtsbezirk Signau
- District
- Flag Coat of arms

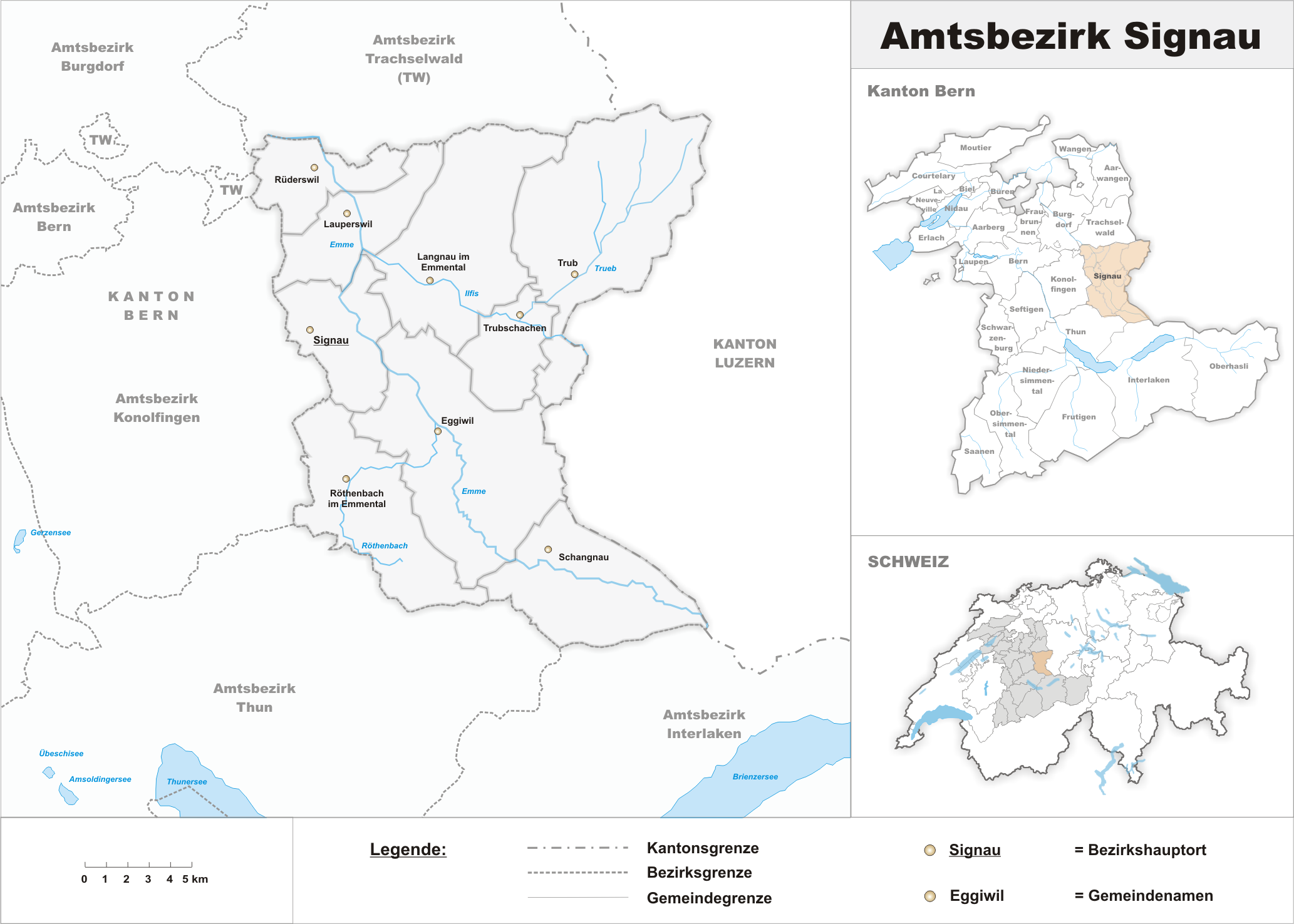
- Country: Switzerland
- Canton: Bern
- Capital: Signau

Area
  - Total: 320 km^{2} (120 sq mi)

Population (2007)
  - Total: 24,222
  - Density: 76/km^{2} (200/sq mi)
- Time zone: UTC+1 (CET)
  - Summer (DST): UTC+2 (CEST)
- Municipalities: 9

Signau District is a district in Switzerland in the canton of Bern with its seat Signau.

From 1 January 2010, the district lost its administrative power while being replaced by the Emmental (administrative district), whose administrative centre is Langnau im Emmental.

Since 2010, it remains therefore a fully recognised district under the law and the Constitution (Art.3 al.2) of the Canton of Berne.

It includes nine municipalities in an area of 320 km^{2}:

Municipality	Population (Dec 2007)	Area (km^{2})
Eggiwil	2,507	60.3
Langnau im Emmental	8,699	48.5
Lauperswil	2,666	21.1
Röthenbach im Emmental	1,288	36.8
Rüderswil	2,341	17.2
Schangnau	906	36.5
Signau	2719	22.1
Trub	1,465	62.0
Trubschachen	1,461	15.6
