= Frutigen District =

Coordinates: 46.5833°N 7.65°E

Frutigen District Amtsbezirk Frutigen
- District
- Flag Coat of arms

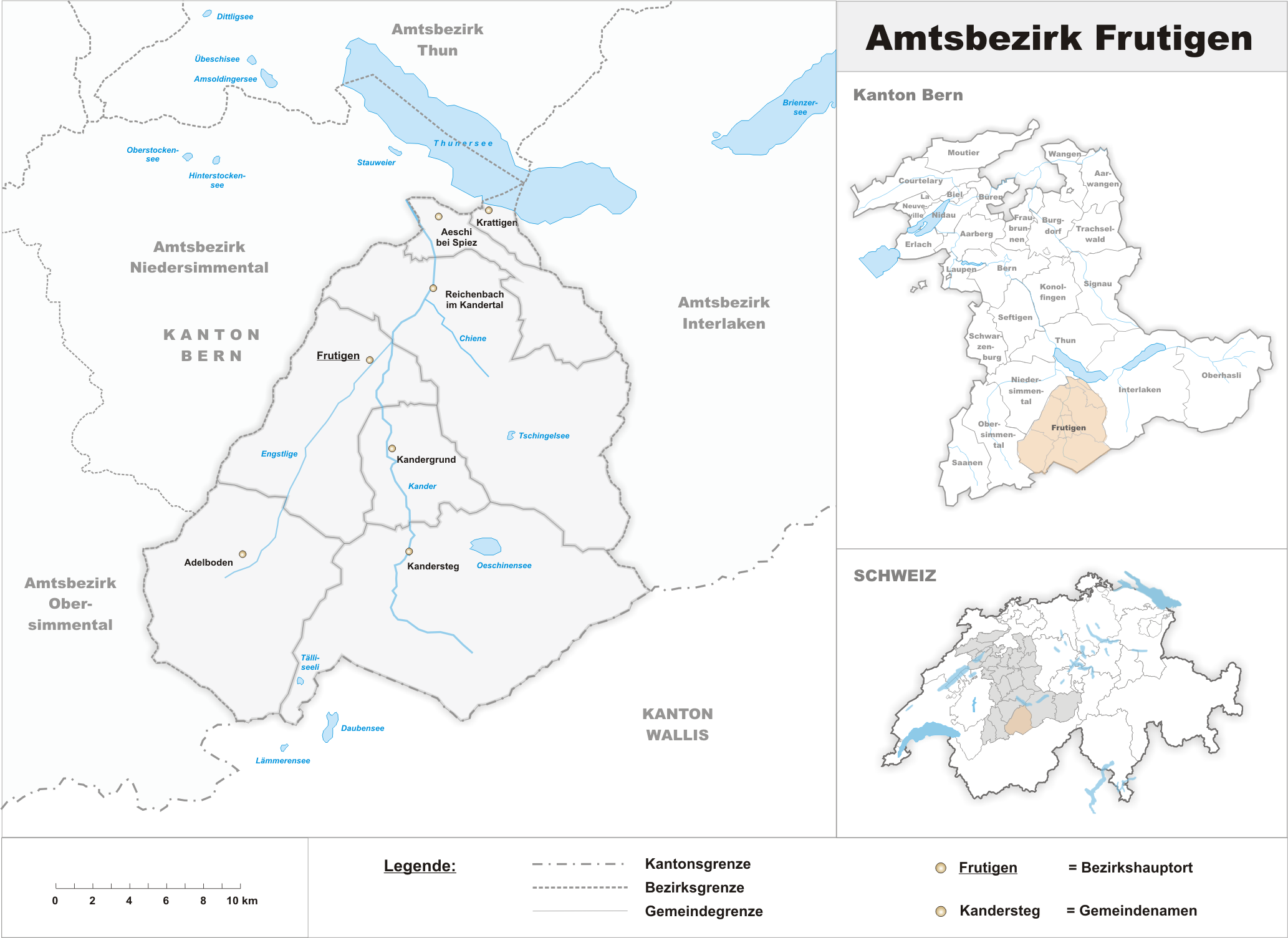
- Country: Switzerland
- Canton: Bern
- Capital: Frutigen

Area
  - Total: 489 km^{2} (189 sq mi)

Population (2007)
  - Total: 18,581
  - Density: 38.0/km^{2} (98.4/sq mi)
- Time zone: UTC+1 (CET)
  - Summer (DST): UTC+2 (CEST)
- Municipalities: 7

Frutigen District is a district in the canton of Bern in Switzerland with its seat at Frutigen. From 1 January 2010, the district lost its administrative power while being replaced by the Frutigen-Niedersimmental (administrative district), whose administrative centre is still Frutigen. Since 2010, it remains a fully recognised district under the law and the Constitution (Art.3 al.2) of the Canton of Berne.

It includes seven municipalities in an area of 490 km^{2}:

Municipality	Population (01.01.2005)	Area (km^{2})
Adelboden	3,686	88.2
Aeschi bei Spiez	1,967	30.9
Frutigen	6,648	71.8
Kandergrund	1,092	32.0
Kandersteg	1,193	134.5
Krattigen	916	6.0
Reichenbach im Kandertal	3,342	125.8
