= Obersimmental District =

Coordinates: 46.55°N 7.36667°E

Obersimmental District Amtsbezirk Obersimmental
- District
- Flag Coat of arms

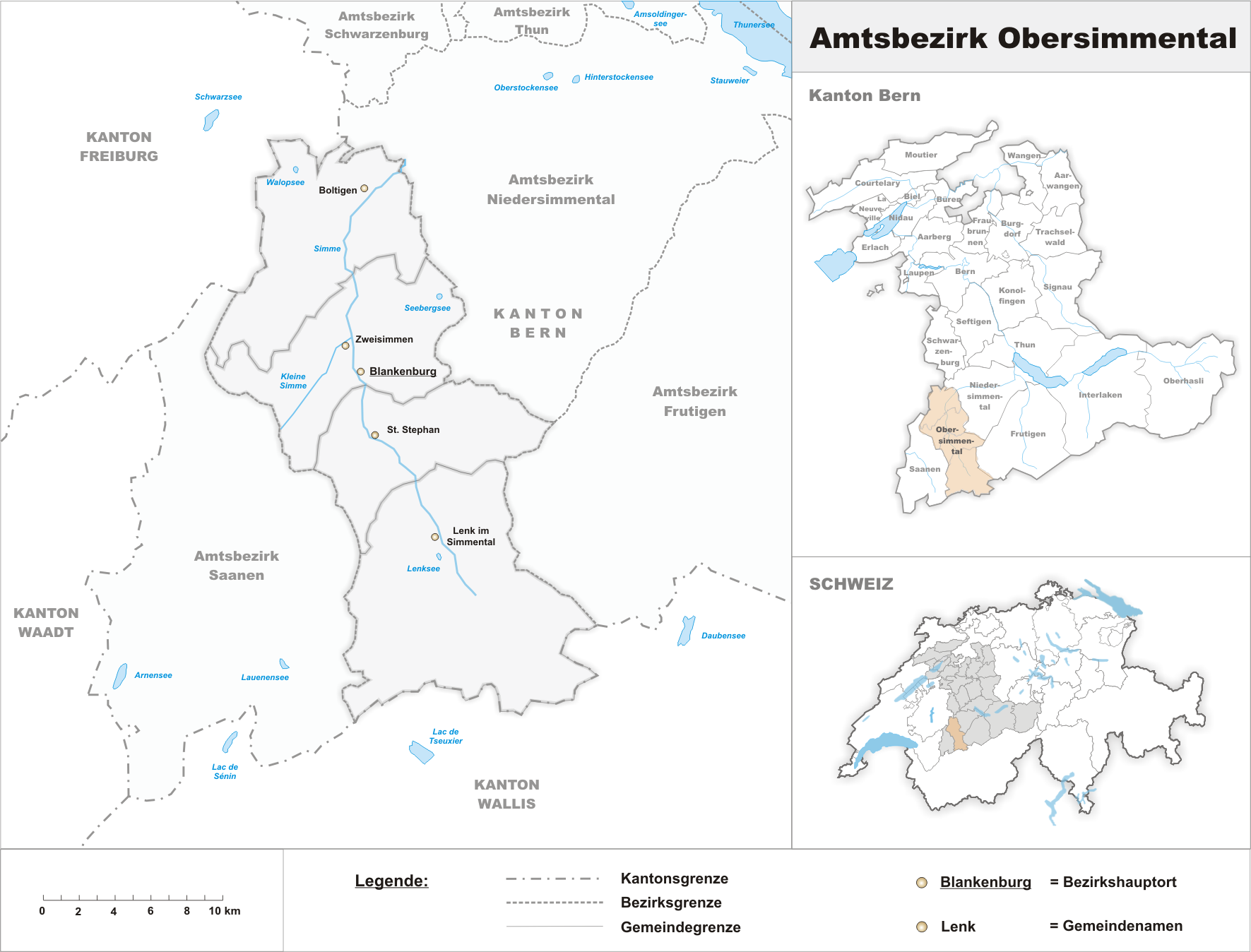
- Country: Switzerland
- Canton: Bern
- Capital: Zweisimmen

Area
  - Total: 334 km^{2} (129 sq mi)

Population (2007)
  - Total: 8,005
  - Density: 24.0/km^{2} (62.1/sq mi)
- Time zone: UTC+1 (CET)
  - Summer (DST): UTC+2 (CEST)
- Municipalities: 4

Obersimmental District is one of the 26 administrative districts in the Canton of Bern, Switzerland. Its capital, while having administrative power was the municipality of Zweisimmen.

From 1 January 2010, the district lost its administrative power while being replaced by the Obersimmental-Saanen (administrative district), whose administrative centre is Saanen.

Since 2010, it remains therefore a fully recognised district under the law and the Constitution (Art.3 al.2) of the Canton of Berne.

The district has an area of 334 km^{2} and consisted of 4 municipalities:

Municipality	Population (Dec 2007)	Area (km^{2})
Boltigen	1,405	77.0
Lenk	2,325	123.1
St. Stephan	1,362	60.9
Zweisimmen	2,913	73.1
