= Saanen District =

Coordinates: 46.4833°N 7.26667°E

Saanen District Amtsbezirk Saanen
- District
- Flag Coat of arms

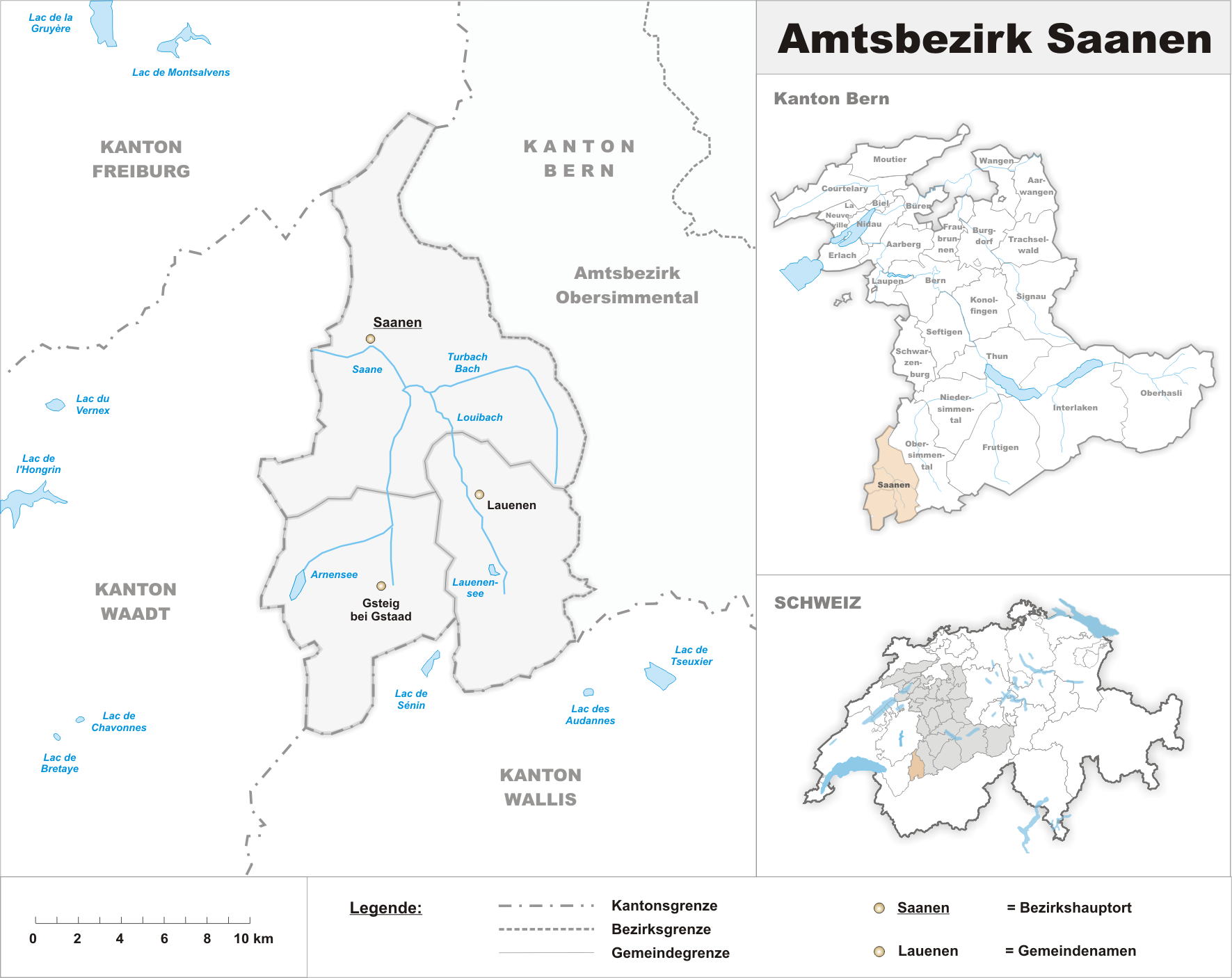
- Country: Switzerland
- Canton: Bern
- Capital: Saanen

Area
  - Total: 241 km^{2} (93 sq mi)

Population (2007)
  - Total: 8,640
  - Density: 35.9/km^{2} (92.9/sq mi)
- Time zone: UTC+1 (CET)
  - Summer (DST): UTC+2 (CEST)
- Municipalities: 3

Saanen District is one of the 26 administrative districts in the canton of Bern, Switzerland. Its capital, while having administrative power, was the municipality of Saanen. From 1 January 2010, the district lost its administrative power while being replaced by the Obersimmental-Saanen (administrative district), whose administrative centre is still Saanen. Since 2010, it remains therefore a fully recognised district under the law and the Constitution (Art.3 al.2) of the Canton of Berne. The district has an area of 241 km^{2} and consists of 3 municipalities:

Municipality	Population (Dec 2007)	Area (km^{2})
Gsteig bei Gstaad	964	62.4
Lauenen	802	58.7
Saanen	6,874	119.8
