= Niedersimmental District =

Administrative district in Switzerland

Coordinates: 46.6667°N 7.63333°E

Niedersimmental District Amtsbezirk Niedersimmental
- District
- Flag Coat of arms

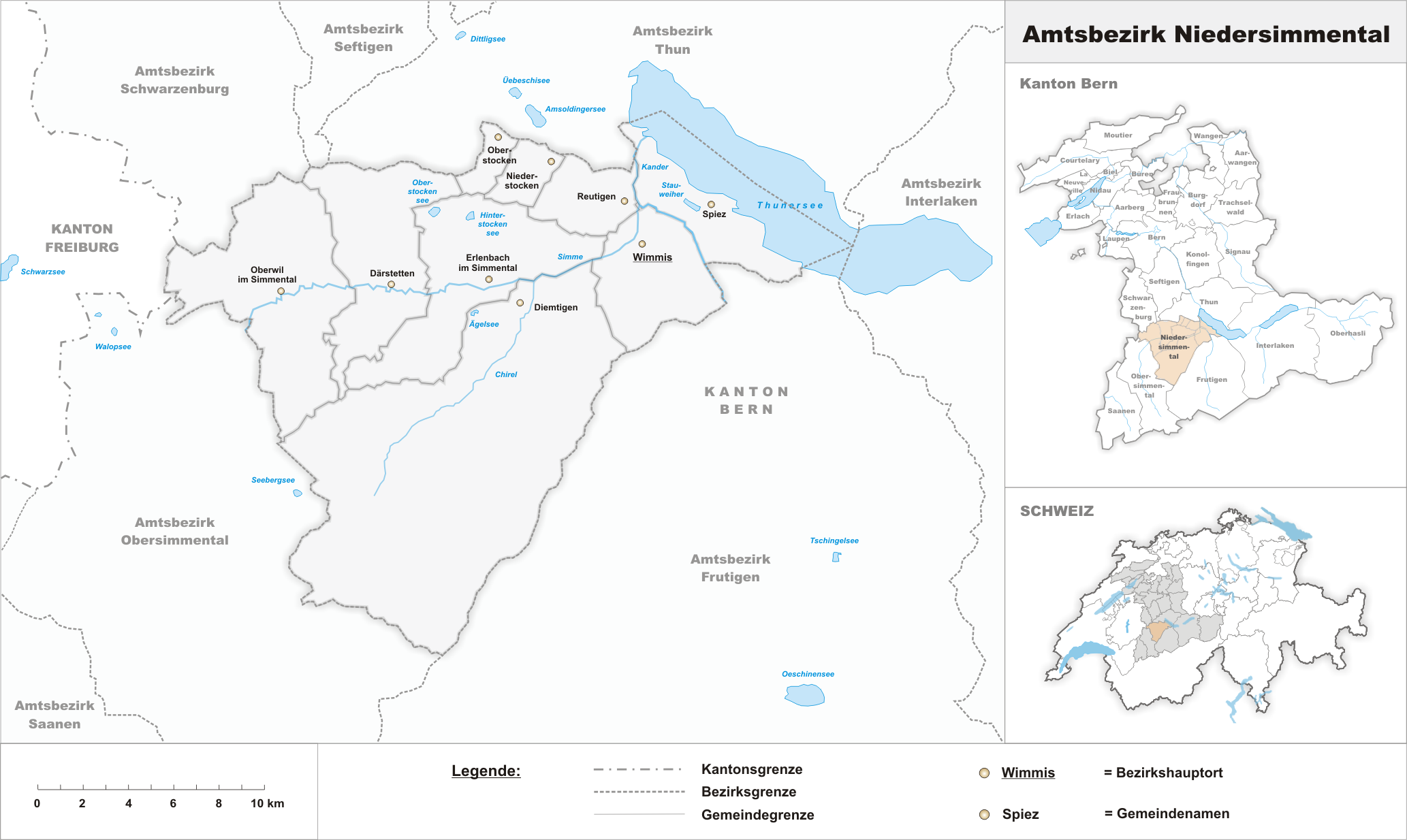
- Country: Switzerland
- Canton: Bern
- Capital: Wimmis

Area
  - Total: 306 km^{2} (118 sq mi)

Population (2007)
  - Total: 21,705
  - Density: 70.9/km^{2} (184/sq mi)
- Time zone: UTC+1 (CET)
  - Summer (DST): UTC+2 (CEST)
- Municipalities: 9

Niedersimmental District is one of the 26 administrative districts in the canton of Bern, Switzerland.

From 1 January 2010, the district lost its administrative power while being replaced by the Frutigen-Niedersimmental (administrative district), whose administrative centre is Frutigen.

As of 2010, it remains therefore a fully recognised district under the law and the Constitution (Art.3 al.2) of the Canton of Berne.

Its capital, while having administrative power, was the municipality of Wimmis. The district had an area of 319 km^{2} and consisted of 9 municipalities:

Municipality	Population (Dec 2007)	Area (km^{2})
Därstetten	854	32.8
Diemtigen	2,138	130.0
Erlenbach im Simmental	1,688	36.7
Niederstocken	281	5.5
Oberstocken	290	4.1
Oberwil im Simmental	829	46.0
Reutigen	934	11.3
Spiez	12,417	16.8
Wimmis	2,274	22.3
