= List of mountains of the canton of Bern =

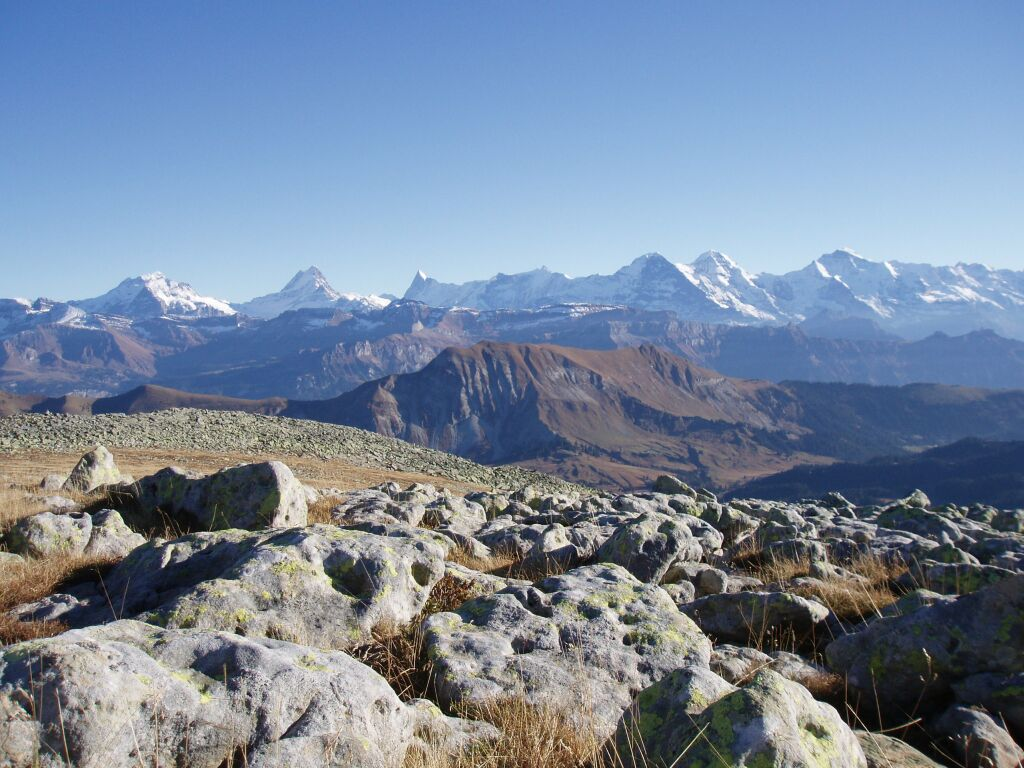
From left to right: Wetterhorn, Schreckhorn, Finsteraarhorn, Gross Fiescherhorn, Eiger, Mönch und Jungfrau, as seen from Hohgant.

This is a list of mountains of the Swiss canton of Bern. Bern is one of the three cantons (with Valais and Graubünden) having summits above 4,000 metres. It is also one of the two cantons (with Vaud) extending over both the Alps and Jura. Topographically, the most important summit of the canton is that of the Finsteraarhorn (most elevated, most prominent and most isolated).

This list only includes significant summits with a topographic prominence of at least 150 metres (492 ft). There are over 160 such summits in the canton of Bern and they are mostly found in the Bernese Oberland and the Bernese Jura, in its southernmost and northernmost districts. All mountain heights and prominences on the list are from the largest-scale maps available.

== List ==
Mountain	Height (m)	Drop (m)	Coordinates	Range	District(s)	First ascent
Finsteraarhorn	4274	2279	46°32′14″N 08°07′34″E	Bernese Alps	Interlaken-Oberhasli	1829
Jungfrau	4158	694	46°32′12″N 07°57′45″E	Bernese Alps	Interlaken-Oberhasli	1811
Mönch	4110	591	46°33′30″N 07°59′50″E	Bernese Alps	Interlaken-Oberhasli	1857
Schreckhorn	4078	795	46°35′24″N 08°07′05″E	Bernese Alps	Interlaken-Oberhasli	1861
Gross Fiescherhorn	4049	396	46°33′05″N 08°03′41″E	Bernese Alps	Interlaken-Oberhasli	1862
Gletscherhorn	3982	355	46°30′46″N 07°58′04″E	Bernese Alps	Interlaken-Oberhasli	1867
Eiger	3967	361	46°34′39″N 08°00′19″E	Bernese Alps	Interlaken-Oberhasli	1858
Ebnefluh	3961	201	46°30′29″N 07°57′11″E	Bernese Alps	Interlaken-Oberhasli	
Agassizhorn	3947	200	46°32′48″N 08°06′52″E	Bernese Alps	Interlaken-Oberhasli	
Mittaghorn	3893	197	46°29′54″N 07°55′47″E	Bernese Alps	Interlaken-Oberhasli	
Breithorn (Lauterbrunnen)	3780	464	46°28′43″N 07°52′36″E	Bernese Alps	Interlaken-Oberhasli	1865
Grosshorn	3754	194	46°29′12″N 07°54′39″E	Bernese Alps	Interlaken-Oberhasli	
Wetterhörner (Mittelhorn)	3702	578	46°38′07″N 08°07′29″E	Bernese Alps	Interlaken-Oberhasli	1845
Balmhorn	3697	1020	46°25′30″N 07°41′37″E	Bernese Alps	Frutigen-Niedersimmental	1864
Wetterhorn	3690	211	46°38′20″N 08°06′56″E	Bernese Alps	Interlaken-Oberhasli	1844
Rosenhorn	3689	193	46°37′55″N 08°08′14″E	Bernese Alps	Interlaken-Oberhasli	
Blüemlisalp(horn)	3660	874	46°29′20″N 07°46′21″E	Bernese Alps	Frutigen-Niedersimmental	1860
Bärglistock	3655	223	46°36′56″N 08°08′27″E	Bernese Alps	Interlaken-Oberhasli	
Doldenhorn	3638	655	46°28′08″N 07°44′05″E	Bernese Alps	Frutigen-Niedersimmental	1862
Studerhorn	3632	230	46°31′58″N 08°08′52″E	Bernese Alps	Interlaken-Oberhasli	
Oberaarhorn	3631	260	46°31′53″N 08°10′28″E	Bernese Alps	Interlaken-Oberhasli	
Tschingelhorn	3555	389	46°28′43″N 07°50′55″E	Bernese Alps	Interlaken-Oberhasli	1865
Sustenhorn	3503	414	46°41′56″N 08°27′19″E	Uri Alps	Interlaken-Oberhasli	1841
Nasse Strahlegg	3485	170	46°33′15″N 08°07′54″E	Bernese Alps	Interlaken-Oberhasli	
Oberaarrothorn	3477	184	46°31′13″N 08°10′51″E	Bernese Alps	Interlaken-Oberhasli	
Hinter Tierberg	3477	187	46°41′03″N 08°23′51″E	Uri Alps	Interlaken-Oberhasli	
Gspaltenhorn	3436	600	46°30′42″N 07°49′39″E	Bernese Alps	Frutigen-Niedersimmental/Interlaken-Oberhasli	1869
Gwächtenhorn	3420	218	46°41′27″N 08°24′48″E	Uri Alps	Interlaken-Oberhasli	
Diechterhorn	3389	308	46°38′55″N 08°21′38″E	Uri Alps	Interlaken-Oberhasli	1864
Tieralplistock (Note: High point north of the Tieralplistock)	3388	173	46°37′59″N 08°22′31″E	Uri Alps	Interlaken-Oberhasli	
Fründenhorn	3368	198	46°28′37″N 07°45′27″E	Bernese Alps	Frutigen-Niedersimmental	
Tschingelspitz	3315	190	46°30′40″N 07°50′23″E	Bernese Alps	Interlaken-Oberhasli	
Hienderstock	3307	208	46°35′08″N 08°12′58″E	Bernese Alps	Interlaken-Oberhasli	
Hangendgletscherhorn	3294	253	46°37′46″N 08°10′57″E	Bernese Alps	Interlaken-Oberhasli	
Hockenhorn	3293	350	46°25′42″N 07°44′39″E	Bernese Alps	Frutigen-Niedersimmental	1840
Ritzlihorn	3277	322	46°37′56″N 08°15′32″E	Bernese Alps	Interlaken-Oberhasli	1816
Wildi Frau	3274	155	46°30′N 07°47′E	Bernese Alps	Bern	
Wildhorn	3250	981	46°21′21″N 07°21′44″E	Bernese Alps	Obersimmental-Saanen	1843
Bächlistock	3247	187	46°35′11″N 08°14′23″E	Bernese Alps	Interlaken-Oberhasli	
Wildstrubel	3244	816	46°24′01″N 07°31′43″E	Bernese Alps	Obersimmental-Saanen	1855
Grossstrubel	3243	157	46°24′46″N 07°33′45″E	Bernese Alps	Frutigen-Niedersimmental	
Titlis	3238	978	46°46′19″N 08°26′16″E	Uri Alps	Interlaken-Oberhasli	1739
Bütlasse	3194	175	46°31′07″N 07°49′12″E	Bernese Alps	Interlaken-Oberhasli	
Wellhorn	3191	240	46°39′21″N 08°08′31″E	Bernese Alps	Interlaken-Oberhasli	
Gärstenhörner	3189	200	46°35′54″N 08°21′42″E	Uri Alps	Interlaken-Oberhasli	
Steghorn	3147	279	46°25′00″N 07°35′03″E	Bernese Alps	Frutigen-Niedersimmental	
Oldenhorn	3123	307	46°19′45″N 07°13′18″E	Vaud Alps	Obersimmental-Saanen	
Steinhüshorn	3121	182	46°40′04″N 08°19′56″E	Uri Alps	Interlaken-Oberhasli	
Löffelhorn	3096	167	46°31′36″N 08°14′13″E	Bernese Alps	Interlaken-Oberhasli	
Geltenhorn	3062	305	46°20′47″N 07°20′04″E	Bernese Alps	Obersimmental-Saanen	
Gross Lohner	3048	560	46°27′43″N 07°36′00″E	Bernese Alps	Frutigen-Niedersimmental	1875
Gross Wendenstock	3042	346	46°45′42″N 08°22′49″E	Uri Alps	Interlaken-Oberhasli	1873
Mutthorn	3037	160	46°29′N 07°49′E	Bernese Alps	Bern	
Wendenhorn	3023	311	46°45′14″N 08°26′37″E	Uri Alps	Interlaken-Oberhasli	1884
Reissend Nollen	3003	229	46°46′00″N 08°24′03″E	Uri Alps	Interlaken-Oberhasli	
Mittlere Lohner	3001	154	46°28′10″N 07°36′34″E	Bernese Alps	Frutigen-Niedersimmental	
Brünberg	2982	170	46°34′36″N 08°16′52″E	Bernese Alps	Interlaken-Oberhasli	
Les Faverges	2971	170	46°22′29″N 07°31′43″E	Bernese Alps	Obersimmental-Saanen	
Schilthorn	2970	358	46°33′27″N 07°50′05″E	Bernese Alps	Interlaken-Oberhasli	
Rohrbachstein	2950	209	46°22′35″N 07°27′44″E	Bernese Alps	Obersimmental-Saanen	
Schnidehorn	2937	181	46°22′23″N 07°23′34″E	Bernese Alps	Obersimmental-Saanen	
Sustenspitz	2931	170	46°43′04″N 08°26′50″E	Uri Alps	Interlaken-Oberhasli	
Hundshorn	2929	284	46°32′34″N 07°48′23″E	Bernese Alps	Interlaken-Oberhasli/Obersimmental-Saanen	
Schwarzhorn	2928	966	46°41′10″N 08°04′32″E	Bernese Alps	Interlaken-Oberhasli	1836
Sanetschhorn	2924	187	46°20′18″N 07°15′46″E	Bernese Alps	Obersimmental-Saanen	
Mährenhorn	2923	355	46°41′30″N 08°18′39″E	Uri Alps	Interlaken-Oberhasli	
Giglistock	2900	166	46°42′35″N 08°23′12″E	Uri Alps	Interlaken-Oberhasli	
Wildgärst	2891	187	46°41′33″N 08°04′28″E	Bernese Alps	Interlaken-Oberhasli	
Gallauistock	2869	168	46°39′07″N 08°14′05″E	Bernese Alps	Interlaken-Oberhasli	
Dündenhorn	2862	222	46°31′13″N 07°43′47″E	Bernese Alps	Frutigen-Niedersimmental	
Gstellihorn	2855	366	46°39′44″N 08°10′29″E	Bernese Alps	Interlaken-Oberhasli	1836
Spitzhorn	2807	209	46°22′30″N 07°18′38″E	Bernese Alps	Obersimmental-Saanen	
Drättehorn	2794	340	46°34′56″N 07°49′26″E	Bernese Alps	Frutigen-Niedersimmental/Interlaken-Oberhasli	
Felsenhorn	2782	182	46°25′43″N 07°36′37″E	Bernese Alps	Frutigen-Niedersimmental	
Niesehorn	2776	281	46°22′56″N 07°22′26″E	Bernese Alps	Obersimmental-Saanen	
Albristhorn	2763	823	46°29′53″N 07°29′16″E	Bernese Alps	Obersimmental-Saanen	
Reeti/Rötihorn	2757	341	46°39′54″N 08°00′42″E	Bernese Alps	Interlaken-Oberhasli	
Ärmighorn	2742	332	46°32′30″N 07°42′49″E	Bernese Alps	Frutigen-Niedersimmental	
Gsür	2708	372	46°30′39″N 07°31′11″E	Bernese Alps	Frutigen-Niedersimmental/Obersimmental-Saanen	
Graustock	2662	166	46°47′16″N 08°22′08″E	Uri Alps	Interlaken-Oberhasli	
Männliflue	2652	374	46°33′05″N 07°32′47″E	Bernese Alps	Frutigen-Niedersimmental	
Rotstock	2632	194	46°26′33″N 07°32′14″E	Bernese Alps	Frutigen-Niedersimmental	
Chlyne Lohner	2587	202	46°29′12″N 07°37′33″E	Bernese Alps	Frutigen-Niedersimmental	
Tällistock	2580	165	46°44′44″N 08°19′30″E	Uri Alps	Interlaken-Oberhasli	
Lobhörner	2566	193	46°36′08″N 07°50′36″E	Bernese Alps	Interlaken-Oberhasli	
Giferspitz	2542	556	46°27′04″N 07°21′12″E	Bernese Alps	Obersimmental-Saanen	
Glogghüs	2534	554	46°45′38″N 08°15′45″E	Uri Alps	Interlaken-Oberhasli	
Bänzlauistock	2530	170	46°41′33″N 08°16′40″E	Uri Alps	Interlaken-Oberhasli	
Tschuggen	2521	460	46°36′01″N 07°56′59″E	Bernese Alps	Interlaken-Oberhasli	
Dreispitz	2520	523	46°35′34″N 07°45′35″E	Bernese Alps	Frutigen-Niedersimmental	
Spillgerte	2476	453	46°32′12″N 07°26′48″E	Bernese Alps	Frutigen-Niedersimmental/Obersimmental-Saanen	
Cheibehore	2462	226	46°33′43″N 07°32′36″E	Bernese Alps	Frutigen-Niedersimmental	
Gummfluh	2458	574	46°26′26″N 07°11′42″E	Bernese Alps	Obersimmental-Saanen	
Hohniesen	2454	371	46°34′38″N 07°35′00″E	Bernese Alps	Obersimmental-Saanen	
Drümännler	2436	152	46°31′52″N 07°32′19″E	Bernese Alps	Frutigen-Niedersimmental	
Rothorn	2410	186	46°32′07″N 07°27′40″E	Bernese Alps	Frutigen-Niedersimmental/Obersimmental-Saanen	
Drunengalm	2408	286	46°37′33″N 07°37′09″E	Bernese Alps	Frutigen-Niedersimmental	
Tschipparällehore	2398	153	46°36′15″N 07°36′18″E	Bernese Alps	Frutigen-Niedersimmental	
Iffighore	2378	195	46°23′36″N 07°24′09″E	Bernese Alps	Obersimmental-Saanen	
Niesen	2362	407	46°38′46″N 07°39′09″E	Bernese Alps	Frutigen-Niedersimmental	
Wistätthorn	2362	370	46°27′15″N 07°23′11″E	Bernese Alps	Obersimmental-Saanen	
Brienzer Rothorn	2350	1342	46°47′13″N 08°02′49″E	Emmental Alps	Interlaken-Oberhasli	
Wittenberghorn	2350	465	46°24′58″N 07°12′36″E	Bernese Alps	Obersimmental-Saanen	
Elsighorn	2341	296	46°32′03″N 07°38′25″E	Bernese Alps	Frutigen-Niedersimmental	
Wiriehorn	2304	273	46°34′49″N 07°31′47″E	Bernese Alps	Frutigen-Niedersimmental	
Furggenspitz	2297	157	46°25′21″N 07°13′48″E	Bernese Alps	Obersimmental-Saanen	
Roteflue	2296	171	46°40′53″N 07°57′28″E	Bernese Alps	Interlaken-Oberhasli	
Seehore	2281	290	46°34′01″N 07°27′41″E	Bernese Alps	Frutigen-Niedersimmental/Obersimmental-Saanen	
Rothore	2276	191	46°23′59″N 07°22′24″E	Bernese Alps	Obersimmental-Saanen	
Morgenberghorn	2249	370	46°37′20″N 07°47′37″E	Bernese Alps	Frutigen-Niedersimmental/Interlaken-Oberhasli	
Schafberg	2239	735	46°38′13″N 07°19′01″E	Bernese Alps	Obersimmental-Saanen	
Dent de Ruth	2236	186	46°33′14″N 07°14′14″E	Bernese Alps	Obersimmental-Saanen	
Oltschiburg	2234	291	46°42′58″N 08°04′45″E	Bernese Alps	Interlaken-Oberhasli	
Tannhorn	2221	168	46°46′29″N 07°59′04″E	Emmental Alps	Interlaken-Oberhasli	
Hohgant	2197	638	46°47′17″N 07°54′07″E	Emmental Alps	Emmental/Interlaken-Oberhasli	
Stockhorn	2190	399	46°41′38″N 07°32′15″E	Bernese Alps	Frutigen-Niedersimmental/Thun	
Ochsen	2188	384	46°41′56″N 07°25′07″E	Bernese Alps	Bern-Mittelland	
Gantrisch	2175	216	46°42′19″N 07°27′02″E	Bernese Alps	Bern-Mittelland/Frutigen-Niedersimmental	
Schibe	2151	267	46°40′21″N 07°23′34″E	Bernese Alps	Bern-Mittelland/Frutigen-Niedersimmental	
Augstmatthorn	2137	272	46°44′32″N 07°55′43″E	Emmental Alps	Interlaken-Oberhasli	
Chingstuel	2118	190	46°46′10″N 08°12′24″E	Uri Alps	Interlaken-Oberhasli	
Widdersgrind	2104	220	46°40′39″N 07°24′25″E	Bernese Alps	Bern-Mittelland/Frutigen-Niedersimmental	
Nünenenflue	2102	197	46°42′23″N 07°27′41″E	Bernese Alps	Bern-Mittelland/Frutigen-Niedersimmental/Thun	
Gumihorn	2100	167	46°39′19″N 07°54′29″E	Bernese Alps	Interlaken-Oberhasli	
Rinderberg	2079	371	46°30′19″N 07°21′25″E	Bernese Alps	Obersimmental-Saanen	
Turnen	2079	343	46°37′40″N 07°29′33″E	Bernese Alps	Obersimmental-Saanen	
Niderhorn	2078	227	46°35′31″N 07°25′47″E	Bernese Alps	Obersimmental-Saanen	
Muntiggalm	2077	200	46°34′24″N 07°26′28″E	Bernese Alps	Obersimmental-Saanen	
Seeberghorn	2071	153	46°22′22″N 07°13′11″E	Bernese Alps	Obersimmental-Saanen	
Schnierenhörnli	2069	151	46°45′52″N 07°55′54″E	Bernese Alps	Interlaken-Oberhasli	
Burgfeldstand	2063	508	46°43′20″N 07°47′41″E	Emmental Alps	Thun	
Sigriswiler Rothorn	2051	372	46°43′50″N 07°46′14″E	Emmental Alps	Thun	
Hundsrügg	2047	414	46°33′24″N 07°18′19″E	Bernese Alps	Obersimmental-Saanen	
Gummhorn	2040	151	46°45′31″N 07°57′19″E	Bernese Alps	Interlaken-Oberhasli	
Lasenberg	2019	167	46°41′25″N 07°33′30″E	Bernese Alps	Frutigen-Niedersimmental/Thun	
Bäderhorn	2009	404	46°36′48″N 07°19′39″E	Bernese Alps	Obersimmental-Saanen	
Wätterlatte	2007	208	46°36′28″N 07°44′37″E	Bernese Alps	Frutigen-Niedersimmental	
Schwidenegg	2007	154	46°41′12″N 07°27′38″E	Bernese Alps	Frutigen-Niedersimmental	
Höhi Wispile	1939	280	46°26′08″N 07°17′35″E	Bernese Alps	Obersimmental-Saanen	
Chasseral	1607	667	47°09′59″N 07°03′34″E	Jura Mountains	Bernese Jura	
Honegg	1546	312	46°48′13″N 07°48′14″E	Emmental Alps	Bern-Mittelland	
Wachthubel	1415	443	46°50′50″N 07°52′12″E	Emmental Alps	Emmental	
Napf	1408	552	47°00′15″N 07°56′24″E	Emmental Alps	Emmental	
Schwändiblueme	1396	320	46°44′49″N 07°42′40″E	Emmental Alps	Thun	
Moron	1337	393	47°15′45″N 07°15′49″E	Jura Mountains	Bernese Jura	
Mont Raimeux	1302	533	47°18′30″N 07°25′45″E	Jura Mountains	Bernese Jura	
Walenmattweid	1240	445	47°17′03″N 07°29′07″E	Jura Mountains	Bernese Jura	
Blasenflue	1118	413	46°55′56″N 07°41′45″E	Emmental Alps	Bern-Mittelland	
Bantiger	947	320	46°58′41″N 07°31′39″E	Emmental Alps	Bern-Mittelland	
Gurten	858	215	46°55′02″N 07°26′37″E	Bernese Alps	Bern-Mittelland	

== See also ==
- List of mountains of Switzerland
- Swiss Alps
