= Hohmädli =

Mountain in Switzerland

- Location within Switzerland

Highest point
- Elevation: 2,021 m (6,631 ft)
- Prominence: 168 m (551 ft)
- Parent peak: Ochsen
- Coordinates: 46°40′44″N 7°25′32″E

Geography
- Location: Bern, Switzerland
- Parent range: Bernese Alps

The Hohmädli (2,021 m) is a mountain of the Bernese Alps, located north of Oberwil in the canton of Bern. It lies east of the Widdersgrind, on the range between the valleys of Morgete and Simmental.
