= Bäderhorn =

Mountain in Switzerland

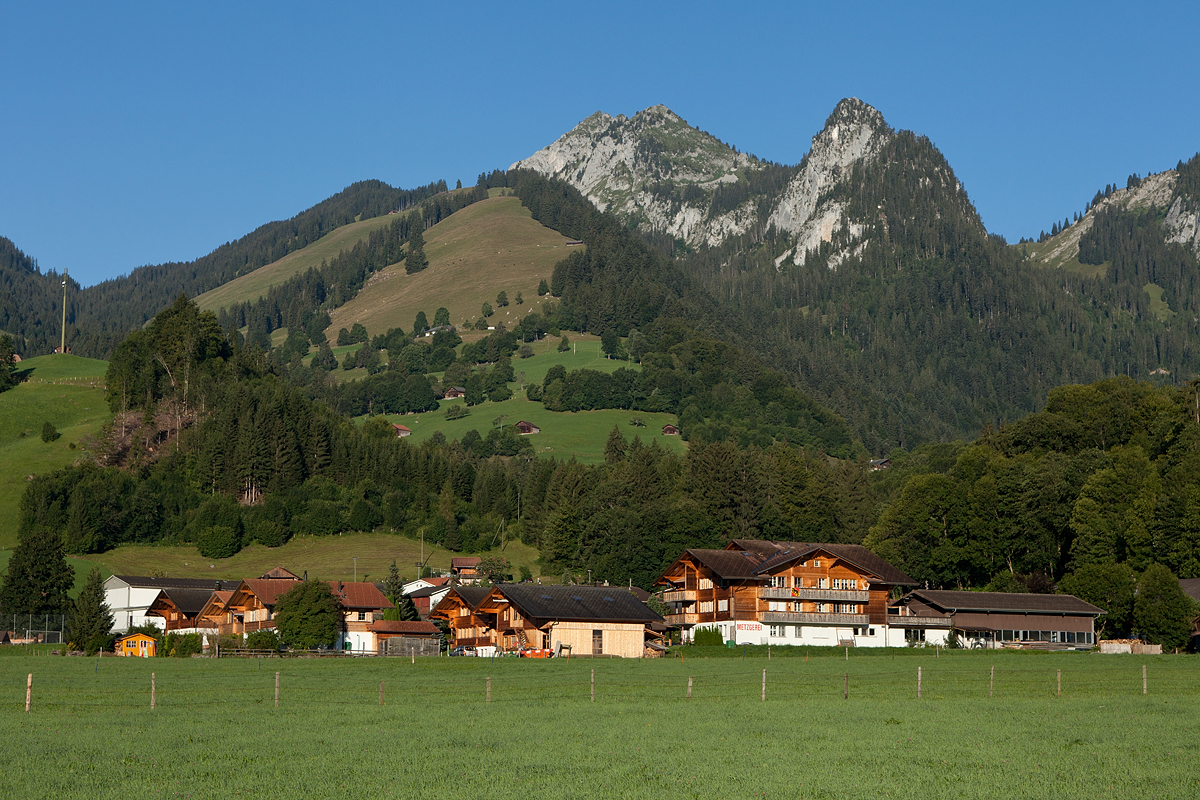
- The Bäderhorn (centre) from Boltigen (east side)

Highest point
- Elevation: 2,009 m (6,591 ft)
- Prominence: 404 m (1,325 ft)
- Parent peak: Schafberg
- Coordinates: 46°36′48″N 7°19′39″E

Geography
- Location within Switzerland
- Location: Bern, Switzerland
- Parent range: Bernese Alps

The Bäderhorn (2,009 m) is a mountain of the Bernese Alps, located north of the Jaun Pass in the canton of Bern. It lies on the range between the valleys of Jaun and Simmental.
