= Saanen =

- Municipality
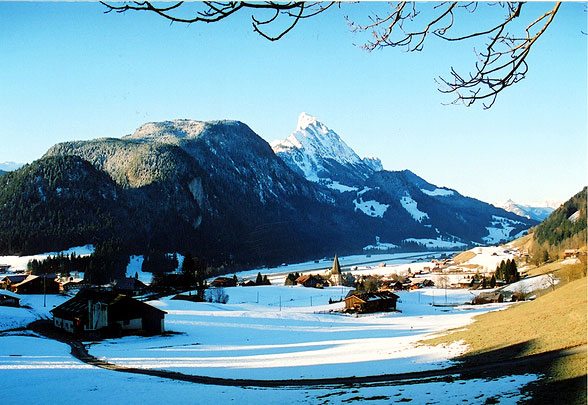

- Flag Coat of arms
- Location of Saanen
- Location within Switzerland Location within Canton of Bern
- Coordinates: 46°29′N 7°16′E
- Country: Switzerland
- Canton: Bern
- District: Obersimmental-Saanen

Area
  - Total: 120.06 km^{2} (46.36 sq mi)
- Elevation: 1,014 m (3,327 ft)
- Highest elevation (Giferspitz): 2,542 m (8,340 ft)
- Lowest elevation (Saane at Rüttischlucht): 985 m (3,232 ft)

Population (December 2020)
  - Total: 6,836
  - Density: 56.94/km^{2} (147.5/sq mi)
- Time zone: UTC+01:00 (CET)
  - Summer (DST): UTC+02:00 (CEST)
- Postal codes: 3792 Saanen; 1657 Abländschen; 3777 Saanenmöser; 3778 Schönried; 3780 Gstaad; 3781 Turbach; 3783 Grund b. Gstaad
- SFOS number: 843
- ISO 3166 code: CH-BE
- Localities: Gstaad, Abländschen, Bissen, Ebnit, Gruben, Grund, Kalberhöni, Saanen, Saanenmöser, Schönried, and Turbach
- Surrounded by: Boltigen, Château-d'Œx (VD), Gsteig bei Gstaad, Jaun (FR), Lauenen, Lenk im Simmental, Rougemont (VD), St. Stephan, Val-de-Charmey (FR), Zweisimmen
- Twin towns: Darmstadt (Germany), Cannes (France), Ordino/La Massana (Andorra)
- Website: www.saanen.ch

Saanen (German pronunciation: [ˈzaːnən]; French: Gessenay; Highest Alemannic: Saanä) is a municipality in the canton of Bern in Switzerland. It is the capital of the Obersimmental-Saanen administrative district.

== History ==
The village was first mentioned in 1228 as Gissinay. In 1340 it was mentioned as Sanon.

During the Bronze Age there was a hill fort on the Cholis Grind near the modern village of Saanen. The region was occupied by the Gallo-Romans until the 10th or 11th century when the Alamanni began to drive them out. This migration created the modern language borders in Switzerland. During the Middle Ages several forts were built to guard the mule trails into the Valais and Vaud. These included the Kramburg (which was first mentioned in 1331 but is now covered by later construction), the Swabia Ried tower (11th-12th century) and the Schönried tower (remains are visible as part of house number 349). During the Middle Ages it was part of the vogtei of Vanel in the county of Gruyère. In 1244, the counts became the vassals of Savoy. The counts' financial problems forced them to sell parts of the vogtei and some of the rights to the residents of Saanen in the 14th century. The village then became the center of the Saanen district and parish.

The villagers often acted against the interests of the counts. In 1340 the valley concluded a peace treaty with the Simmental, which provided for arbitration in disputes. They entered into another treaty in 1393 with the Valais. In 1401, Count Rudolph of Gruyère entered into a treaty with Bern which included Saanen. Two years later Saanen negotiated their own alliance with Bern. Due to the Bernese alliance, Saanen sent troops, under their own banner, to support the Bernese invasions of Aargau in 1415 and Valais in 1418. The military losses and taxes following the Old Zürich War led Saanen to support the Evil League (Böser Bund) in 1445 against Bern. It took about six years before Confederation mediation was able to resolve the arguments between Saanen and Bern.

During the Burgundian War in 1475 Saanen, together with troops from Château-d'Œx and the Simmental captured the Savoy district of Aigle for Bern. Saanen and the surrounding district enjoyed a great deal of independence during the 16th century. However, in 1555 the last Count of Gruyère lost the entire district to Bern when his county went bankrupt. Bern took over the entire valley in the following year and introduced the Protestant Reformation. The Bernese bailiff administered the districts of Gessenay (Saanen) and Pays-d'Enhaut until the great fire of 1575 which destroyed much of the town. The bailiff then moved to the former monastery of Mont Rouge.

The district covered eleven separate Bäuerten or agricultural collectives or farming villages and the towns of Saanen and Gstaad. The main sources of income were seasonal alpine herding, forestry and providing warehousing and extra oxen for wagon trains coming over the mule trails. Saanen was the market town for the surrounding villages, with weekly and yearly markets in the town. There were two taverns in Saanen for merchants and travelers.

The village church of St. Mauritius was built in 1228. It was expanded in 1444-47 and the wall paintings are from the second half of the 15th century. Other churches in the area included the St. Anna chapel, built in 1511, the St. John's chapel and the Plague chapel. The parish was administered by a group of five or six priests and chaplains.

Until the 1798 French invasion, the Pays-d'Enhaut and Saanen districts were jointly administered. Under the Helvetic Republic, Pays-d'Enhaut became part of the Canton of Léman while Saanen and the rest of the district became part of the Canton of Oberland. When the Helvetic Republic collapsed in 1803, Saanen and its district became a district in the new Canton of Bern.

In 1833, Saanen became a political municipality. In 1845 the Zweisimmen-Saanen road replaced the old mule trail and the town got postal service. Around 1900, tourism began to grow in Saanen and Gstaad and new hotels opened. The opening of the Montreux–Lenk im Simmental line in 1905, made it easier for tourists to visit. During both World Wars, the tourism industry in Saanen suffered, but it has expanded since 1945. Between the wars, a small weaving industry developed which helped support the municipality. After the war a number of small local industries also developed in the area. The major employer at the beginning of the 21st century was Bergbahnen Destination Gstaad AG, a company that brings together more than 60 different cable cars and lifts in the region. There are 11 school buildings in Saanen, including a secondary school, which was first built in 1867. The Businessmen's Vocational School opened in 1908 and is now the Saanenland-Obersimmental business school, which is part of the Thun business school. The District Hospital opened in 1905.

=== Gstaad ===
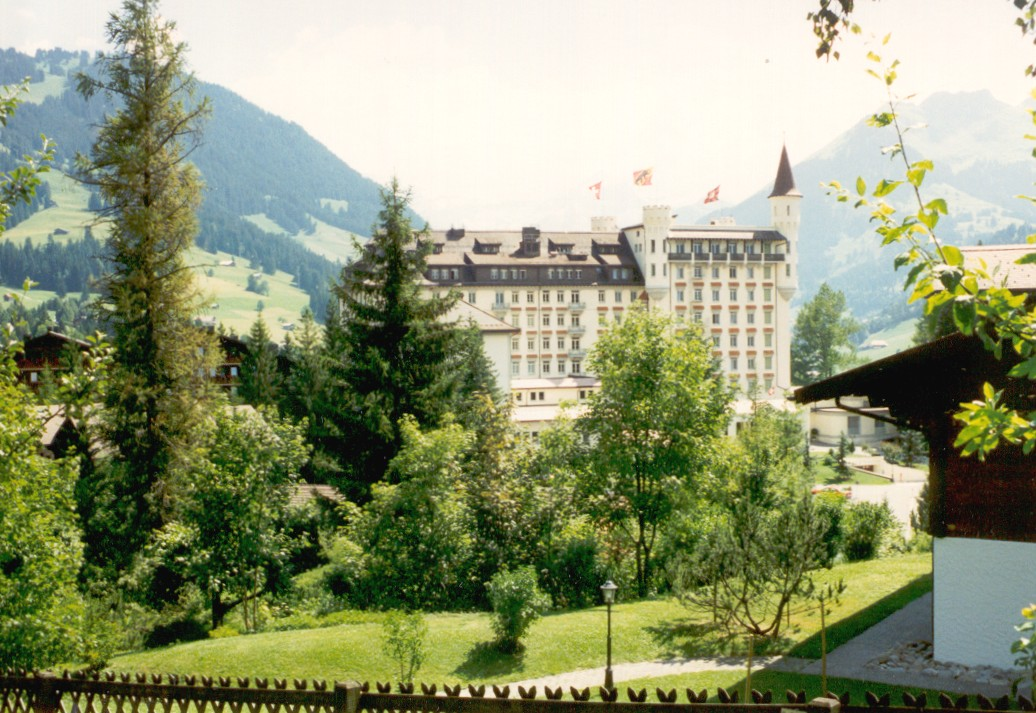
Gstaad Palace Hotel, one of several hotels built in Gstaad

During the Middle Ages, Gstaad village developed at the fork in the trails into the Valais and Vaud. It had an inn, a warehouse for storing trade goods and oxen to help pull wagons over the alpine passes by the 13th-14th centuries. The St. Nicholas chapel was built in the village in 1402, while the murals are from the second half of the 15th century. The village was dominated by cattle farming and agriculture until the great fire of 1898. It was then rebuilt to support the growing tourism industry. In a short time there were more than 1,000 hotel beds in the region.

The Palace Hotel opened in 1913 as Gstaad's first luxury hotel. During the World Wars and the Great Depression, the tourism industry suffered, and many hotels closed. After World War II, many of the large hotels remained closed, but they were replaced with a number of smaller non-hotel accommodation (chalets, apartment houses, residences). Most of the modern resorts and small hotels are built out of wood and retain traditional design elements.

=== Abländschen ===
Abländschen is a small hamlet in the upper Jaun valley. It is the only Bernese settlement in the otherwise Fribourg valley. Its population was 52 in 1990, down from a peak of 132 in 1888. The area was transferred in 1555 along with the rest of the Saanen parish from the Counts of Gruyere to Bern. Abländschen has always been hard to reach from Saanen and even today it can only be reached by a road from Boltigen over the Jaun Pass. Agriculture is still important to this day and is still the most important source of income. About one-third of the farms have a home farm, a spring pasture and alpine shelters. However, almost all farmers also have a second job either in forestry, tourism or as commuters to another town for weekday work.

== Geography ==
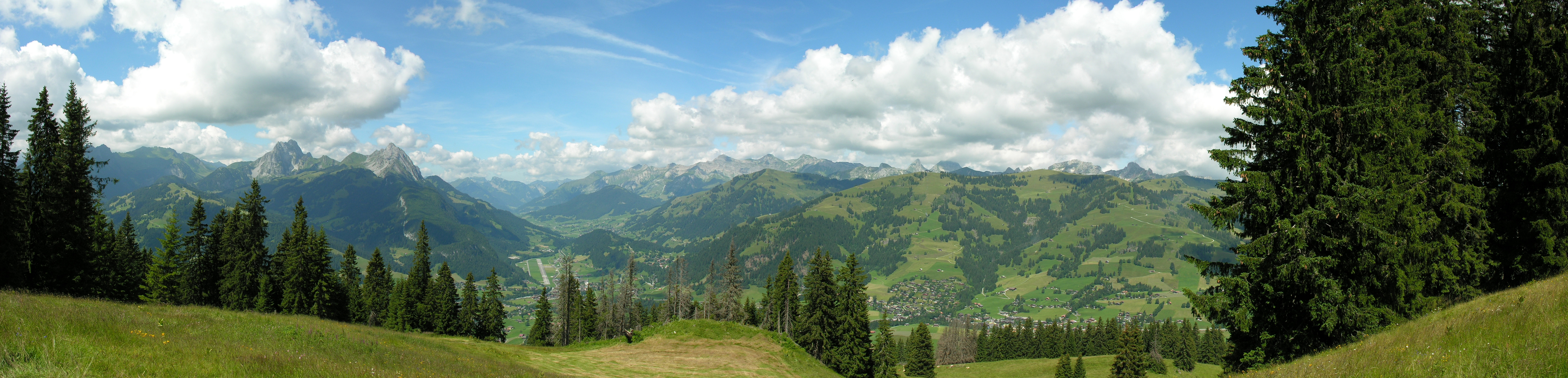
Hornberg and countryside near Saanen

Saanen has an area of 120.06 km^{2} (46.36 sq mi). Of this area, 61.4 km^{2} (23.7 mi^{2}) or 51.3% is used for agricultural purposes, while 42.21 km^{2} (16.30 mi^{2}) or 35.3% is forested. Of the rest of the land, 5.46 km^{2} (2.11 mi^{2}) or 4.6% is settled (buildings or roads), 0.68 km^{2} (0.26 mi^{2}) or 0.6% is either rivers or lakes and 9.99 km^{2} (3.86 mi^{2}) or 8.3% is unproductive land.

Of the built-up area, housing and buildings made up 2.4% and transportation infrastructure made up 1.4%. Out of the forested land, 27.6% of the total land area is heavily forested and 5.5% is covered with orchards or small clusters of trees. Of the agricultural land, 15.3% is pastures and 35.9% is used for alpine pastures. All the water in the municipality is flowing water. Of the unproductive areas, 4.8% is unproductive vegetation and 3.5% is too rocky for vegetation.

The municipality is located in the upper Saane valley. It consists of the economic center and district capital, the village of Saanen along with the villages of Gstaad, Abländschen, Bissen, Ebnit, Gruben, Grund, Kalberhöni, Saanen, Saanenmöser, Schönried, and Turbach.

== Coat of arms ==
The blazon of the municipal coat of arms is Gules a Crane rising Argent beaked and membered Or on a Mount of 3 Coupeaux of the second.

== Demographics ==
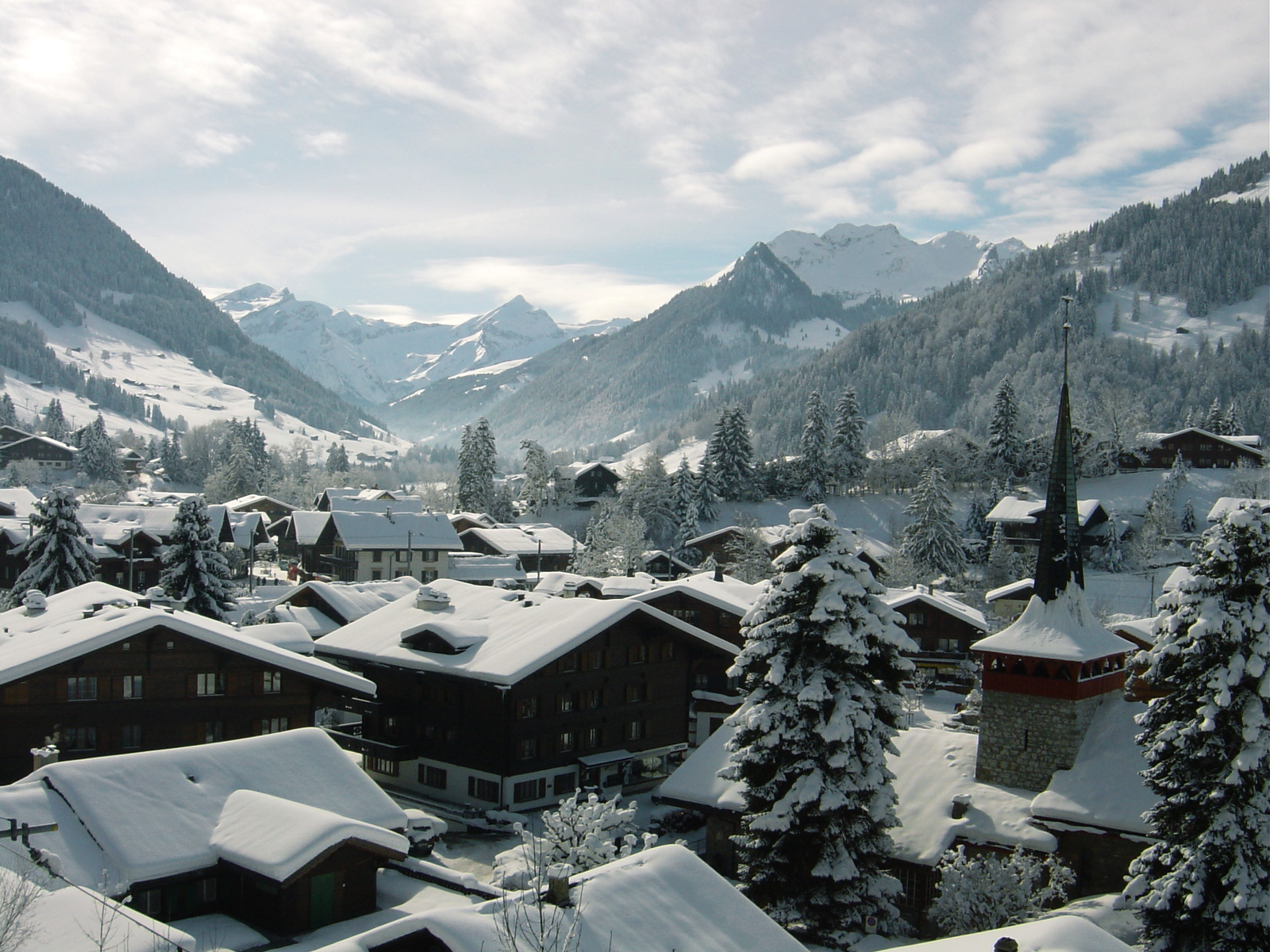
Houses in Gstaad village

Saanen has a population (as of December 2020) of 6,836. As of 2010, 24.6% of the population are resident foreign nationals. Over the last 10 years (2000–2010) the population has changed at a rate of 5.4%. Migration accounted for 6.1%, while births and deaths accounted for 1.4%.

Most of the population (as of 2000) speaks German (5,676 or 82.1%) as their first language, French is the second most common (247 or 3.6%) and Portuguese is the third (239 or 3.5%). There are 120 people who speak Italian and 5 people who speak Romansh.

As of 2008, the population was 50.2% male and 49.8% female. The population was made up of 2,584 Swiss men (37.2% of the population) and 906 (13.0%) non-Swiss men. There were 2,661 Swiss women (38.3%) and 804 (11.6%) non-Swiss women. Of the population in the municipality, 3,000 or about 43.4% were born in Saanen and lived there in 2000. There were 1,267 or 18.3% who were born in the same canton, while 842 or 12.2% were born somewhere else in Switzerland, and 1,392 or 20.1% were born outside of Switzerland.

As of 2000, children and teenagers (0–19 years old) make up 24.3% of the population, while adults (20–64 years old) make up 60.3% and seniors (over 64 years old) make up 15.4%.

As of 2000, there were 3,104 people who were single and never married in the municipality. There were 3,147 married individuals, 390 widows or widowers and 273 individuals who are divorced.

As of 2000, there were 2,660 private households in the municipality, and an average of 2.3 persons per household. There were 1,006 households that consist of only one person and 205 households with five or more people. In 2000, a total of 2,446 apartments (48.8% of the total) were permanently occupied, while 2,325 apartments (46.4%) were seasonally occupied and 242 apartments (4.8%) were empty. As of 2009, the construction rate of new housing units was 5.4 new units per 1000 residents. The vacancy rate for the municipality, in 2010, was 1.48%.

The historical population is given in the following chart:

== Heritage sites of national significance ==
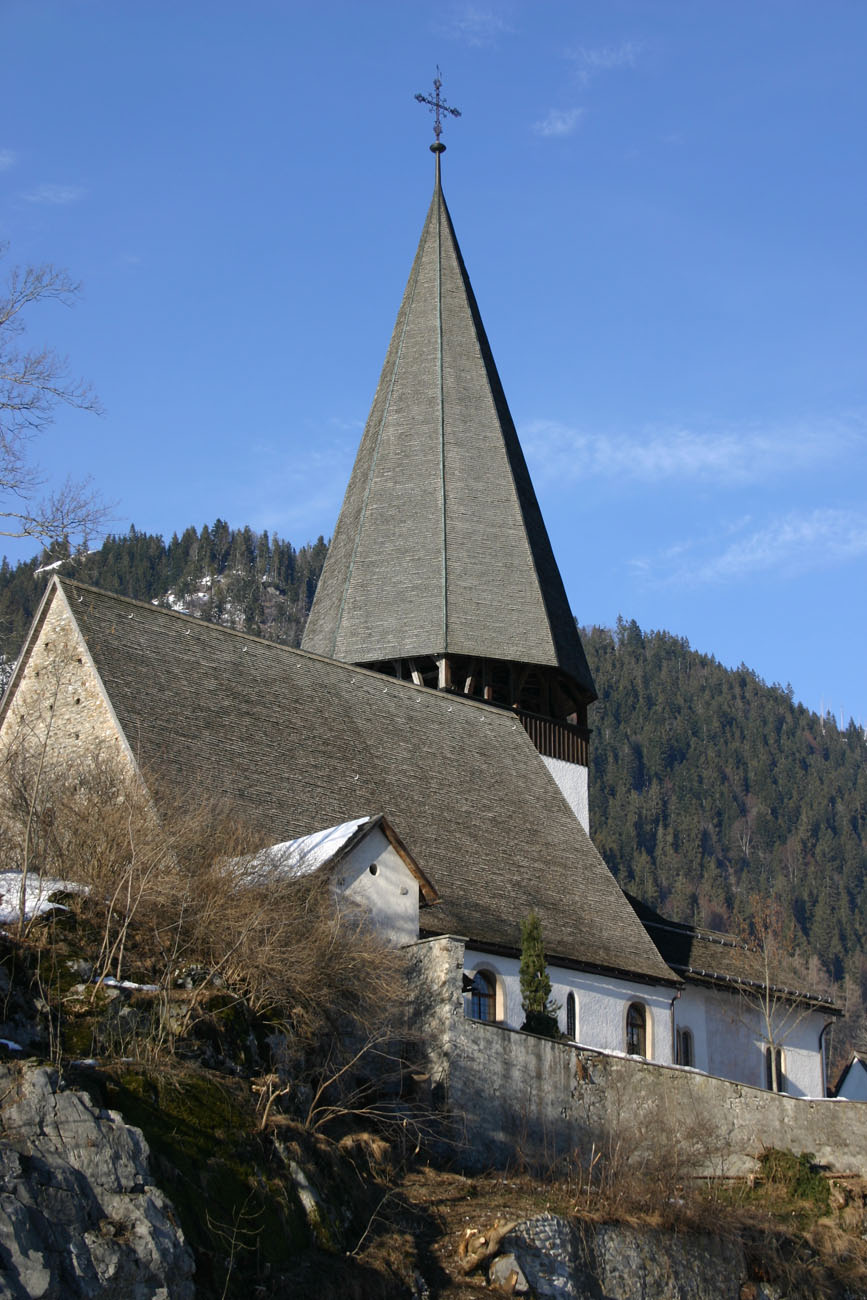
Saanen village church

The Alte Kastlanei and the Church are listed as Swiss heritage site of national significance. The entire village of Saanen is part of the Inventory of Swiss Heritage Sites.

== Politics ==
In the 2007 federal election the most popular party was the SVP which received 54.58% of the vote. The next three most popular parties were the FDP (17.06%), the SPS (8.03%) and the Green Party (5.92%). In the federal election, a total of 2,084 votes were cast, and the voter turnout was 48.8%.

== Economy ==
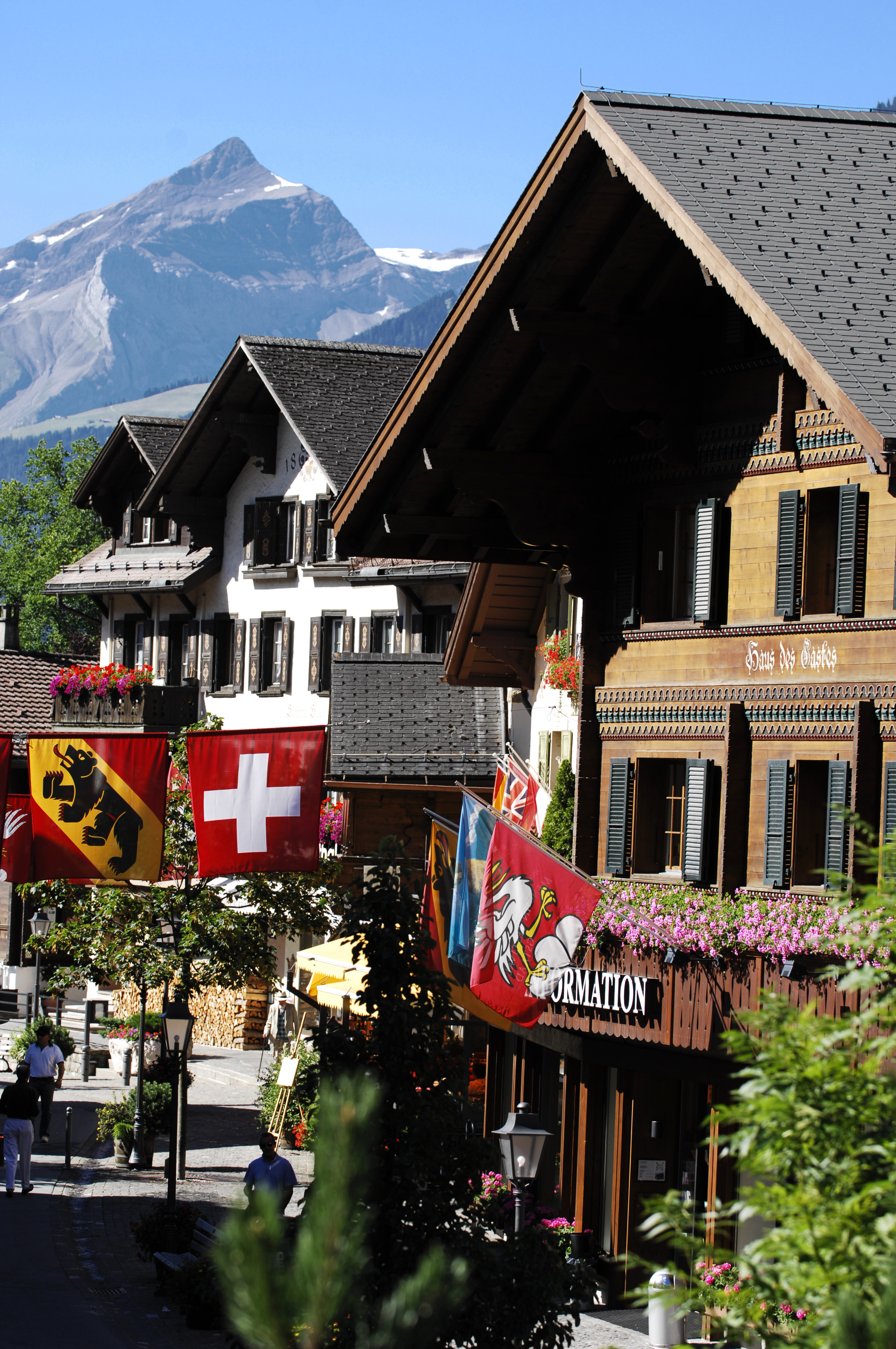
Gstaad Promenade with a tourist office. About one-third of the jobs in Saanen are in tourism.

As of 2010, Saanen had an unemployment rate of 1.8%. As of 2008, there were 491 people employed in the primary economic sector and about 202 businesses involved in this sector. 1,199 people were employed in the secondary sector and there were 110 businesses in this sector. 3,969 people were employed in the tertiary sector, with 414 businesses in this sector.

In 2008 the total number of full-time equivalent jobs was 4,852. The number of jobs in the primary sector was 298, of which 290 were in agriculture and 8 were in forestry or lumber production. The number of jobs in the secondary sector was 1,117 of which 188 or (16.8%) were in manufacturing and 891 (79.8%) were in construction. The number of jobs in the tertiary sector was 3,437. In the tertiary sector, 907 or 26.4% were in wholesale or retail sales or the repair of motor vehicles, 212 or 6.2% were in the movement and storage of goods, 1,156 or 33.6% were in a hotel or restaurant, 12 or 0.3% were in the information industry, 95 or 2.8% were the insurance or financial industry, 192 or 5.6% were technical professionals or scientists, 108 or 3.1% were in education and 235 or 6.8% were in health care.

In 2000, there were 1,013 workers who commuted into the municipality and 256 workers who commuted away. The municipality is a net importer of workers, with about 4.0 workers entering the municipality for each 1 leaving. Of the working population, 5.7% used public transportation to get to work, and 44.3% used a private car.

== Religion ==
From the 2000 census, 1,089 or 15.8% were Roman Catholic, while 4,363 or 63.1% belonged to the Swiss Reformed Church. Of the rest of the population, there were 169 members of an Orthodox church (or about 2.44% of the population), there were 5 individuals (or about 0.07% of the population) who belonged to the Christian Catholic Church, and there were 564 individuals (or about 8.16% of the population) who belonged to another Christian church. There were 15 individuals (or about 0.22% of the population) who were Jewish, and 146 (or about 2.11% of the population) who were Islamic. There were 10 individuals who were Buddhist and 6 individuals who belonged to another church. 342 (or about 4.95% of the population) belonged to no church, are agnostic or atheist, and 480 individuals (or about 6.94% of the population) did not answer the question.

== Education ==
In Saanen about 2,437 or (35.2%) of the population have completed non-mandatory upper secondary education, and 695 or (10.1%) have completed additional higher education (either university or a Fachhochschule). Of the 695 who completed tertiary schooling, 53.2% were Swiss men, 21.4% were Swiss women, 14.7% were non-Swiss men and 10.6% were non-Swiss women.

The Canton of Bern school system provides one year of non-obligatory Kindergarten, followed by six years of Primary school. This is followed by three years of obligatory lower Secondary school where the students are separated according to ability and aptitude. Following the lower Secondary students may attend additional schooling or they may enter an apprenticeship.

During the 2009–10 school year, there were a total of 740 students attending classes in Saanen. There were 7 kindergarten classes with a total of 109 students in the municipality. Of the kindergarten students, 27.5% were permanent or temporary residents of Switzerland (not citizens) and 29.4% have a different mother language than the classroom language. The municipality had 17 primary classes and 335 students. Of the primary students, 13.1% were permanent or temporary residents of Switzerland (not citizens) and 18.5% have a different mother language than the classroom language. During the same year, there were 16 lower secondary classes with a total of 228 students. There were 10.1% who were permanent or temporary residents of Switzerland (not citizens) and 14.9% have a different mother language than the classroom language.

As of 2000, there were 238 students in Saanen who came from another municipality, while 51 residents attended schools outside the municipality.

=== Private schools ===
John F. Kennedy International School is a private boarding school and summer camp located in Saanen. Originally, called Kinderheim Chalet Pfrundacker, the school later became known as John F. Kennedy International School. Founded in 1949 by Fred Sicking and his wife, the school is an institution, with 75 boarding and day students, whose ages range from 5 to 16. JFKIS's (upper) secondary education (Middle and High School) is neither approved as a Gymnasium by the bureau for gymnasial and vocational education MBA (Mittelschul- und Berufsbildungsamt MBA), administration for education (Erziehungsdirektion), canton of Bern, nor by the Swiss Federal State Secretariat for Education, Research and Innovation (SERI). It is an English language school and offers daily ski instruction in the Swiss Alps. JFK School has a student-teacher ratio of 3 to 1.

Previously Gstaad International School had its Alpine Lodge Campus in Saanen.

== Notable people ==
- Yehudi Menuhin (1916–1999), musician
- Andreas Matti (born 1959), actor
- Christian Kracht (born 1966), writer
- Michael von Grünigen (born 1969), world skiing champion
- Philippe Bach (born 1974), conductor
- Stefanie von Siebenthal (born 1977), snowboarder.
- Gjon's Tears (born 1998), singer and songwriter

== International relations ==
Saanen is twinned with:

- Cannes, France
- Darmstadt, Germany (1991)
- Ordino / La Massana, Andorra
