= Chänelpass =

- Location within Switzerland
- Elevation: 1,791 metres (5,876 ft)
- Traversed by: Trail

Third Approach
- Location: Fribourg/Bern, Switzerland
- Range: Bernese Alps
- Coordinates: 46°39′46″N 07°22′19″E

The Chänelpass (1,791 m) is a high mountain pass of the Bernese Alps, located on the border between the Swiss cantons of Fribourg and Bern. It connect Plaffeien (Fribourg) with Oberwil im Simmental (Bern). The pass lies on the watershed between the Sense and the Simme and is located between the Märe and the Schafarnisch. It is traversed by a trail.
