= Schwabenkriegschroniken =

Record of the Swabian War

The Schwabenkriegschroniken (chronicles of the Swabian War) are a series of independent accounts written in Switzerland in or shortly after 1499 and recording the history of the war. The main texts are:

- Kaspar Frey, Schwabenkriegschronik - St. Gallen, 1499
- Acta des Tyrolerkriegs - Graubünden, 1499
- Ulrich Huber, Wiler Chronik des Schwabenkriegs - Wil (St. Gallen), 1499
- Hans (Johann) Lenz, Schwabenkriegschronik - Saanen, 1499
- Basler Schwabenkriegschronik - Basel, post-1504
- Berner Chronik des Schwabenkriegs - Bern, 1500/1510
- Zürcher Schwabenkriegschronik - Zürich, ca 1501/03
