= Gantrisch =

Mountain in Switzerland

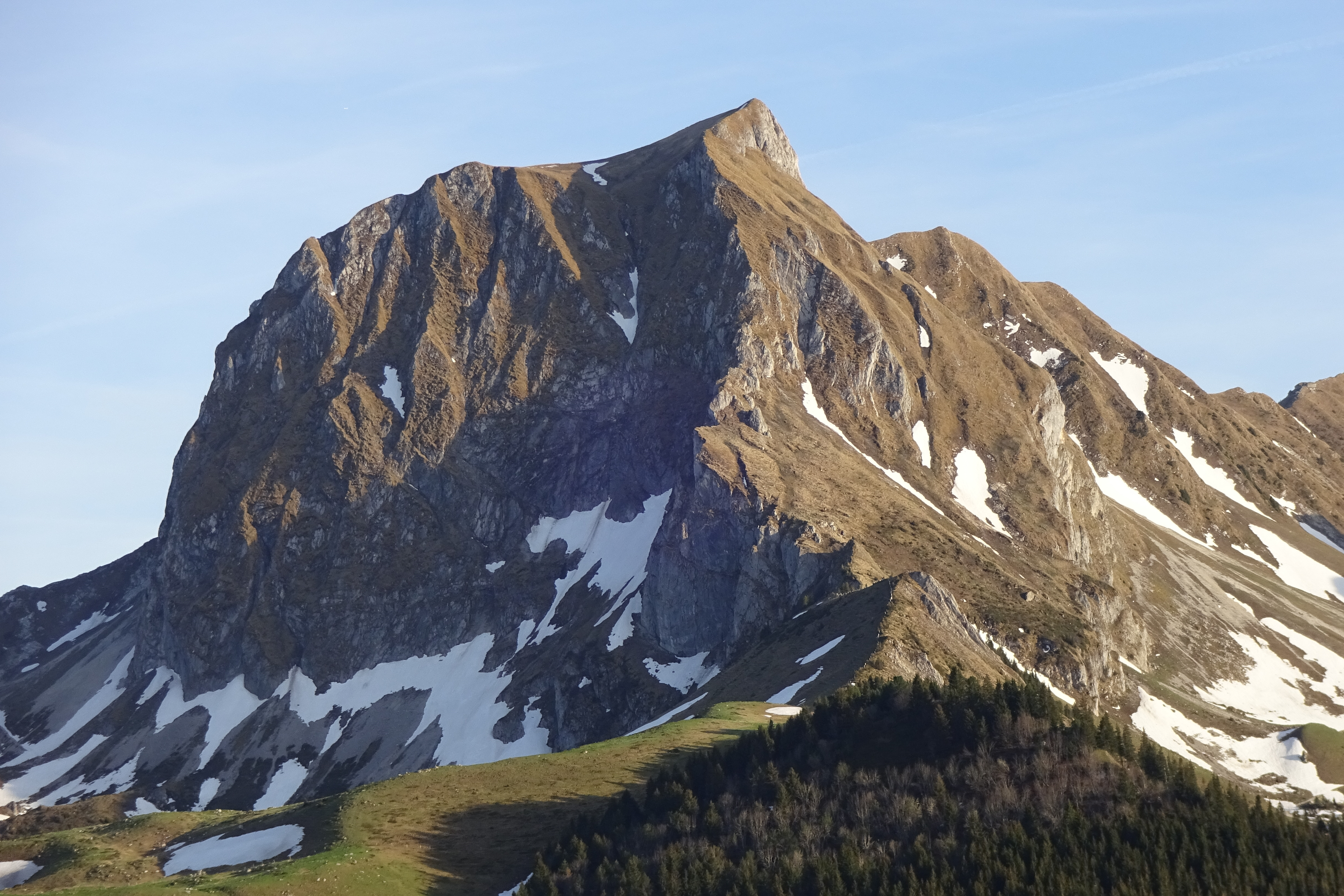

Highest point
- Elevation: 2,175 m (7,136 ft)
- Prominence: 216 m (709 ft)
- Parent peak: Ochsen
- Coordinates: 46°42′18.6″N 7°27′1.8″E

Geography
- Location within Switzerland
- Location: Bern, Switzerland
- Parent range: Bernese Alps

The Gantrisch is a mountain in the north-western Bernese Alps, located between the Simmental and the Aar valley in the canton of Bern. The mountain lies near Gurnigel Pass, from where it is usually climbed. A trail leads to the summit.

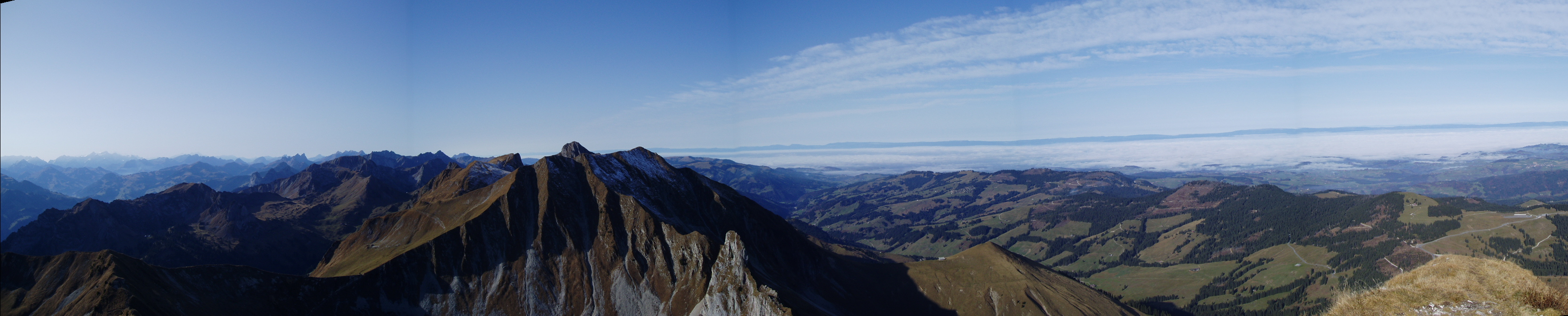
View from the summit

== See also ==
- Nature parks in Switzerland
