= Seehore =

Mountain in Switzerland

- Seehorn
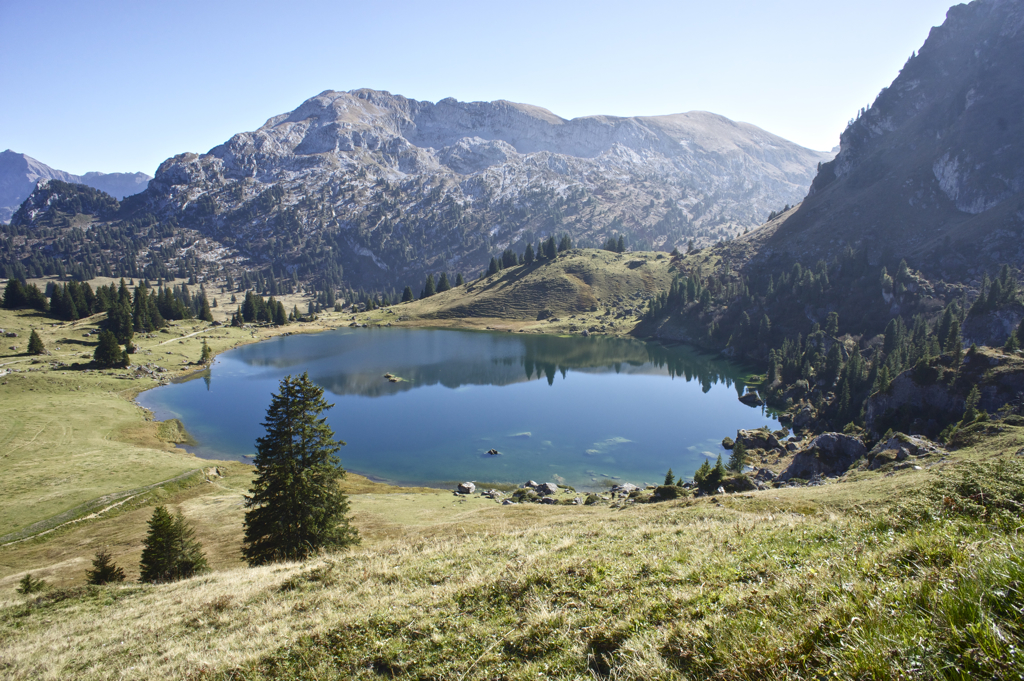
- The Seehore from the Seebergsee (north side)

Highest point
- Elevation: 2,281 m (7,484 ft)
- Prominence: 290 m (950 ft)
- Parent peak: Albristhorn
- Coordinates: 46°34′0.9″N 7°27′41.2″E

Geography
- Location within Switzerland
- Location: Bern, Switzerland
- Parent range: Bernese Alps

The Seehore (also spelled Seehorn) is a mountain of the Bernese Alps, located east of Zweisimmen in the Bernese Oberland. It lies on the range between the Simmental and the Diemtigtal, north of the Spillgerte.
