= Spillgerte =

Mountain in Switzerland

- Hinderi Spillgerte
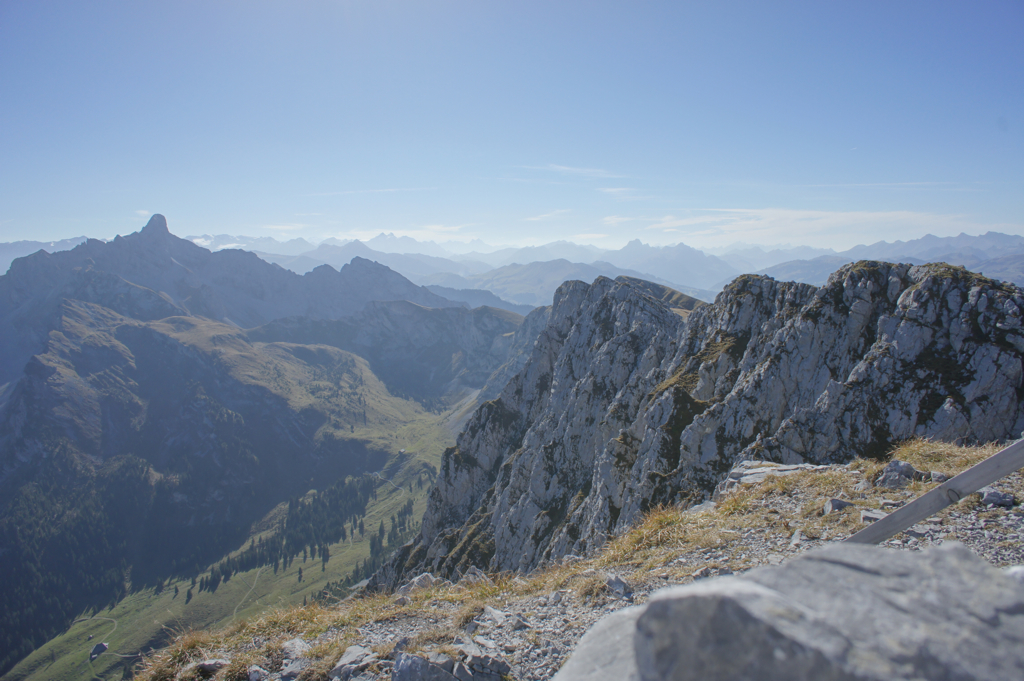
- The Spillgerte (left peak) from the Seehore (north side)

Highest point
- Elevation: 2,476 m (8,123 ft)
- Prominence: 453 m (1,486 ft)
- Parent peak: Albristhorn
- Coordinates: 46°32′11.9″N 7°26′48.3″E

Geography
- Location within Switzerland
- Location: Bern, Switzerland
- Parent range: Bernese Alps

The Spillgerte (or Spillgerten) is a mountain of the Bernese Alps, located east of Zweisimmen in the Bernese Oberland. The mountain lies between the valleys of Diemtigen and Simmental, a few kilometres north of the Albristhorn. It is composed of several summits of which the Hinderi Spillgerte (2,476 m) is the highest.
