= Gstaad International School =

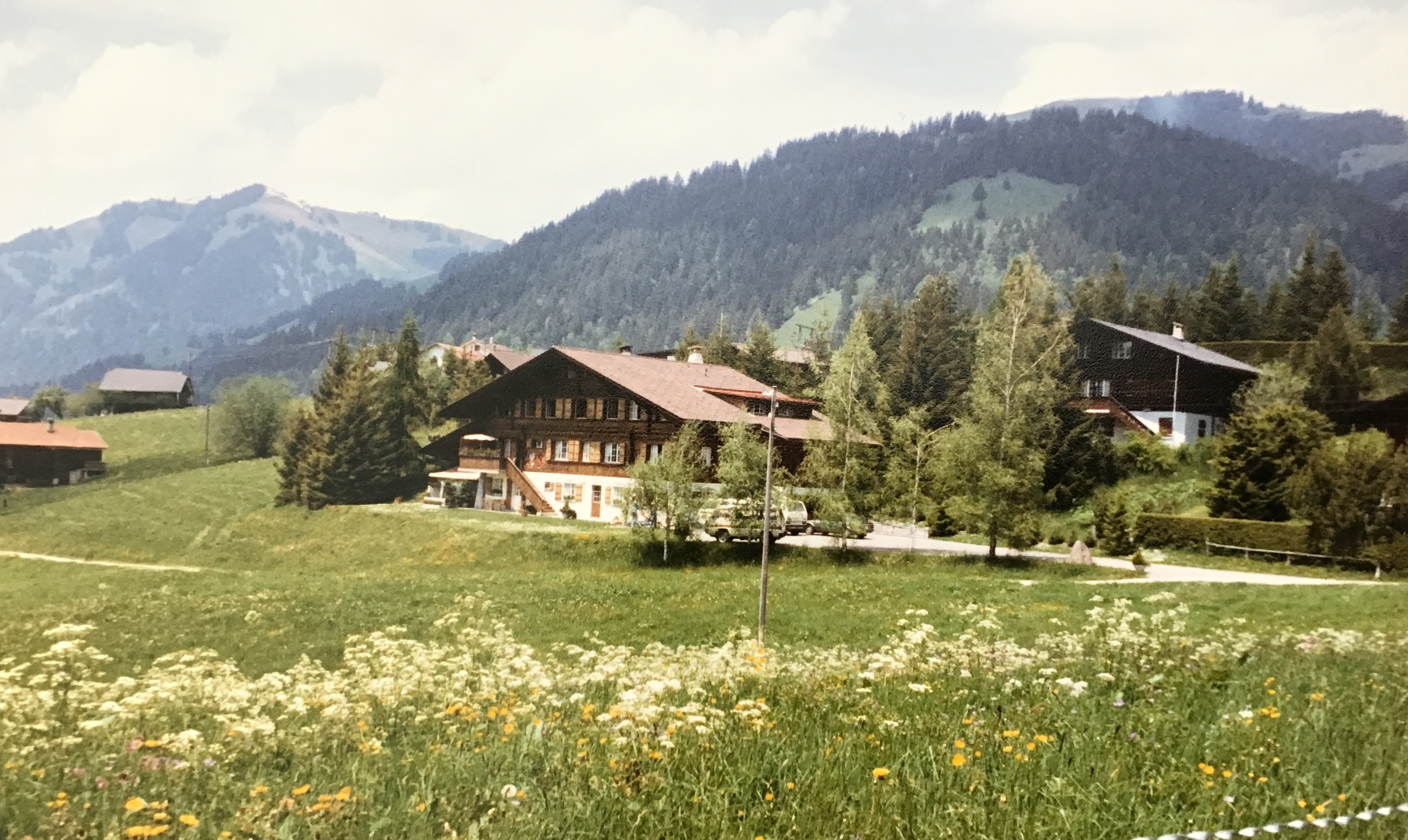
- Gstaad & Saanen, Switzerland

Information
- Established: 1962
- Closed: June 2014

Gstaad International School was a co-educational day and boarding school located in Gstaad, Switzerland and was founded in 1962.

Gstaad International School had two campuses, the Chalet Ahorn Campus in Gstaad and the Alpine Lodge Campus in Saanen.
