= Hundsrügg =

Mountain in Switzerland

- Location within Switzerland

Highest point
- Elevation: 2,047 m (6,716 ft)
- Prominence: 414 m (1,358 ft)
- Parent peak: Dent de Savigny
- Coordinates: 46°33′24″N 7°18′19″E

Geography
- Location: Bern, Switzerland
- Parent range: Bernese Alps

The Hundsrügg (2,047 m) is a mountain of the Bernese Alps, located west of Zweisimmen in the Bernese Oberland. It is the highest point of the chain south of the Jaun Pass and east of the Gastlosen.
