= Rinderberg =

Mountain in Switzerland

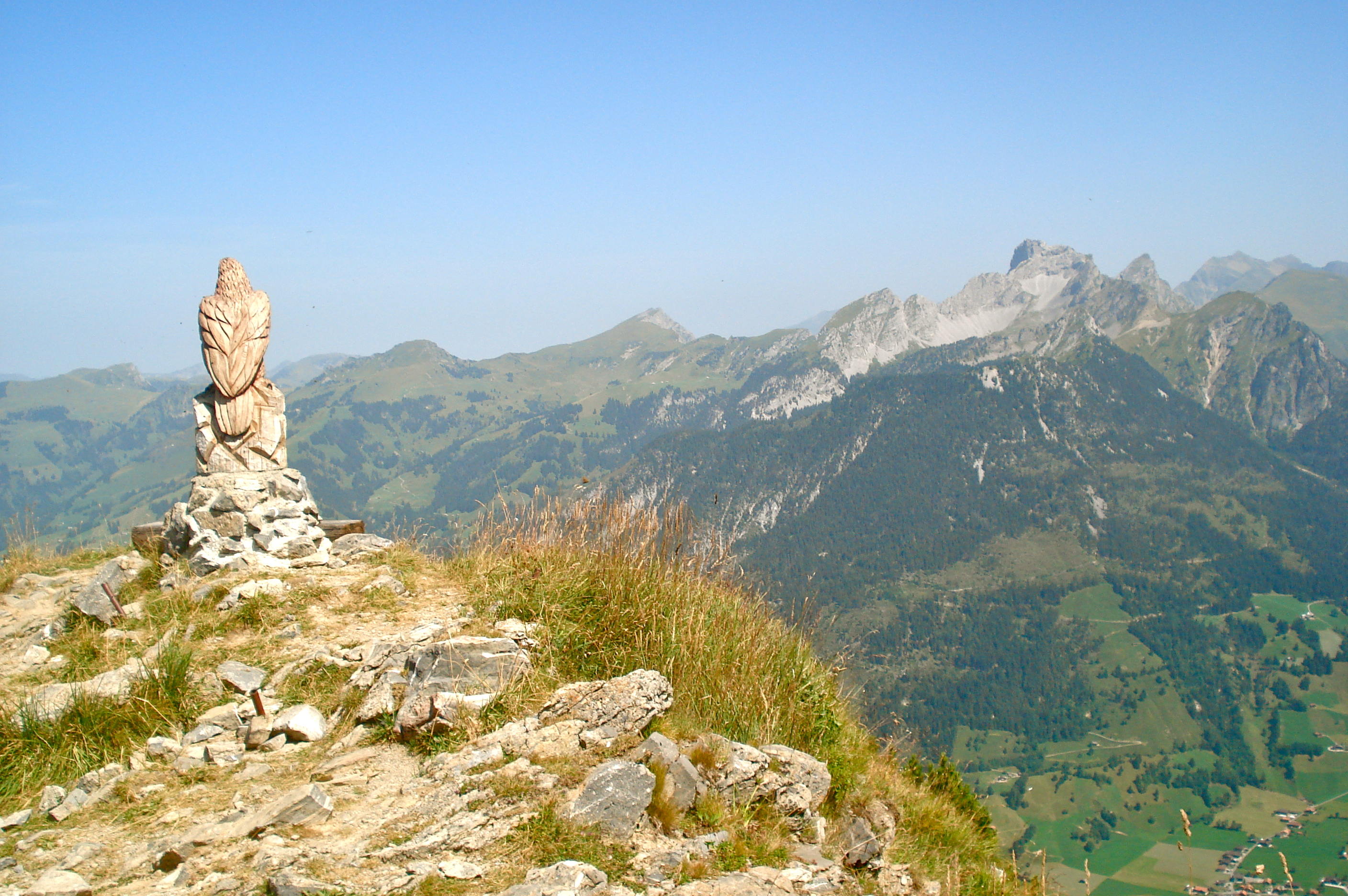
- View from the summit

Highest point
- Elevation: 2,079 m (6,821 ft)
- Prominence: 371 m (1,217 ft)
- Coordinates: 46°30′19″N 7°21′24.5″E

Geography
- Location within Switzerland
- Location: Bern, Switzerland
- Parent range: Bernese Alps

Climbing
- Easiest route: Aerial tramway

The Rinderberg (2,079 m) is a mountain of the Bernese Alps, located between Gstaad and St. Stephan in the Bernese Oberland. It lies at the northern end of the range that separates the valley of the Saane from the Simmental, north of the Wildhorn.

In winter the Rinderberg is part of the ski area named Gstaad Mountain Rides. A cable car station is located near the top at a height of 2,004 metres.

== See also ==
- List of mountains of Switzerland accessible by public transport
