= Niderhorn =

Mountain in Switzerland

- Location within Switzerland

Highest point
- Elevation: 2,078 m (6,818 ft)
- Prominence: 227 m (745 ft)
- Coordinates: 46°35′30.7″N 7°25′46.8″E

Geography
- Location: Bern, Switzerland
- Parent range: Bernese Alps

The Niderhorn is a mountain of the Bernese Alps, located north of Zweisimmen in the Bernese Oberland. It lies between the valleys of Simmental and Diemtigen.
