= Gallauistöck =

Mountain in Switzerland

- Location within Switzerland

Highest point
- Elevation: 2,869 m (9,413 ft)
- Prominence: 168 m (551 ft)
- Parent peak: Finsteraarhorn
- Coordinates: 46°39′7″N 8°14′5″E

Geography
- Location: Bern, Switzerland
- Parent range: Bernese Alps

The Gallauistöck is a mountain of the Bernese Alps, overlooking Guttannen in the Bernese Oberland. It lies north of the Ritzlihorn on the range separating the Urbachtal from the main Aar valley.

On the south side of the mountain lies the Mattenalpsee.
