= Schafarnisch =

Mountain in Switzerland

- Location within Switzerland

Highest point
- Elevation: 2,107 m (6,913 ft)
- Prominence: 281 m (922 ft)
- Parent peak: Schafberg
- Coordinates: 46°39′18.9″N 7°22′8.1″E

Geography
- Location: Fribourg/Bern, Switzerland
- Parent range: Bernese Alps

The Schafarnisch is a mountain of the Bernese Alps, located on the border between the Swiss cantons of Fribourg and Bern. It lies north of Boltigen, in the group culminating at the Schafberg.
