= Märe =

Mountain in Switzerland

- Location within Switzerland

Highest point
- Elevation: 2,091 m (6,860 ft)
- Prominence: 140 m (460 ft)
- Parent peak: Schibe
- Coordinates: 46°40′29.9″N 7°22′35.5″E

Geography
- Location: Fribourg/Bern, Switzerland
- Parent range: Bernese Alps

The Märe is a mountain of the Bernese Alps, located on the border between the Swiss cantons of Fribourg and Bern. The Märe lies approximately halfway between Schwarzsee and Oberwil im Simmental.
