= Turnen =

Mountain in Switzerland

- Location within Switzerland

Highest point
- Elevation: 2,079 m (6,821 ft)
- Prominence: 343 m (1,125 ft)
- Coordinates: 46°37′40.1″N 7°29′33″E

Geography
- Location: Bern, Switzerland
- Parent range: Bernese Alps

The Turnen is a mountain of the Bernese Alps, overlooking Zwischenflüh in the Bernese Oberland. It lies in the range between the Simmental and the Diemtigtal.
