= Schwidenegg =

Mountain in Switzerland

- Location within Switzerland

Highest point
- Elevation: 2,007 m (6,585 ft)
- Prominence: 154 m (505 ft)
- Parent peak: Ochsen
- Coordinates: 46°41′11.5″N 7°27′38″E

Geography
- Location: Bern, Switzerland
- Parent range: Bernese Alps

The Schwidenegg (2,007 m) is a mountain of the Bernese Alps, located north of Weissenburg in the canton of Bern. It lies between the valleys of Morgete and Buuschetal.
