= Schibe =

Mountain in Switzerland

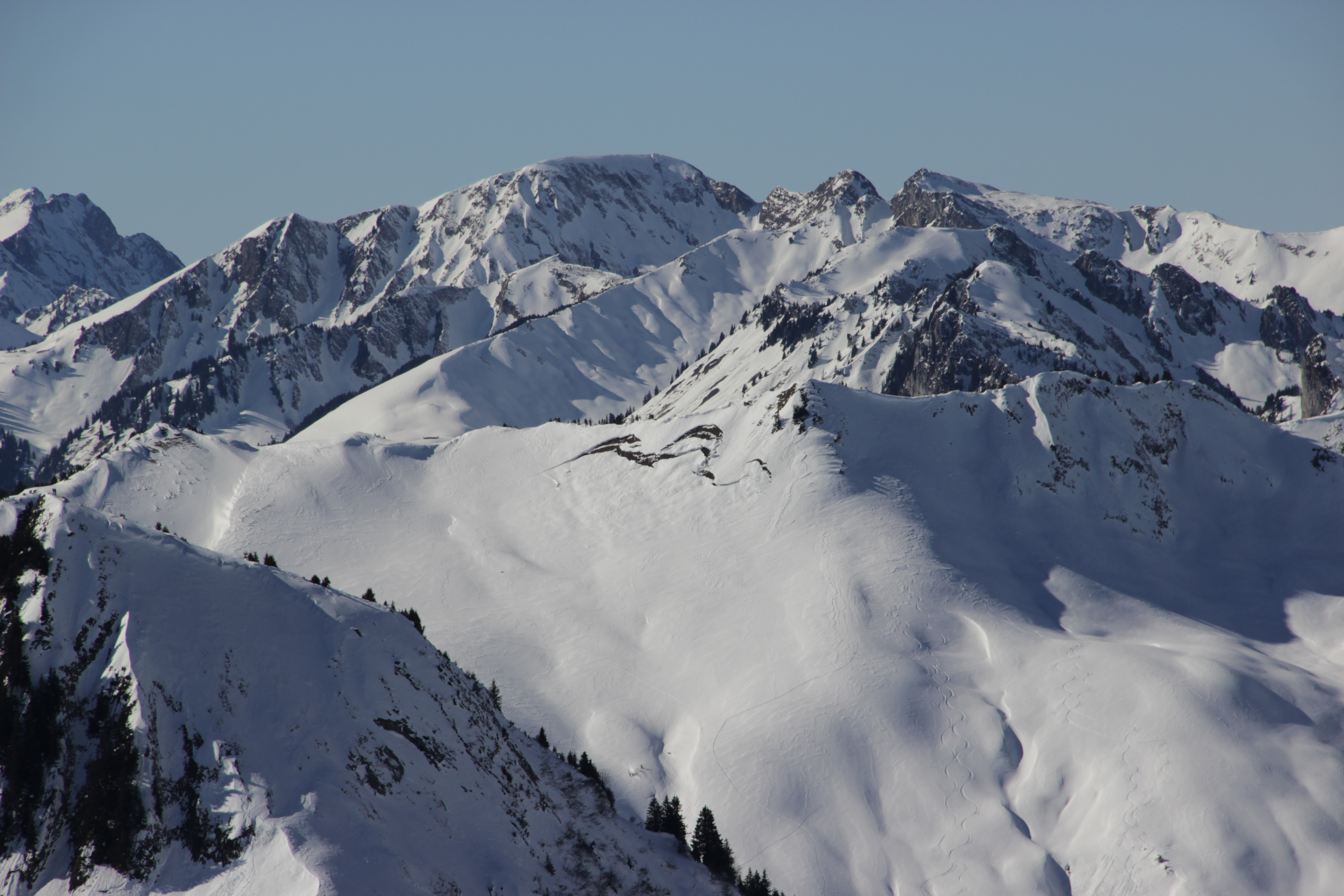

Highest point
- Elevation: 2,151 m (7,057 ft)
- Prominence: 268 m (879 ft)
- Parent peak: Ochsen
- Coordinates: 46°40′21″N 7°23′34″E

Geography
- Location within Switzerland Location within Canton of Bern
- Country: Switzerland
- Canton: Bern
- Parent range: Bernese Alps

The Schibe is a mountain of the Bernese Alps, located near Oberwil im Simmental in the canton of Bern, Switzerland.

== See also ==
- List of mountains of the canton of Bern
