= Widdersgrind =

Mountain in Switzerland

- Location within Switzerland

Highest point
- Elevation: 2,104 m (6,903 ft)
- Prominence: 220 m (720 ft)
- Parent peak: Ochsen
- Coordinates: 46°40′39″N 7°24′25″E

Geography
- Location: Bern, Switzerland
- Parent range: Bernese Alps

The Widdersgrind (2,104 m) is a mountain in the Bernese Alps north of Oberwil in the canton of Bern. Its summit is the tripoint between the valleys of Hengstschlund, Morgete, and Simmental.
