= Jaun, Switzerland =

Jaun
- Municipality
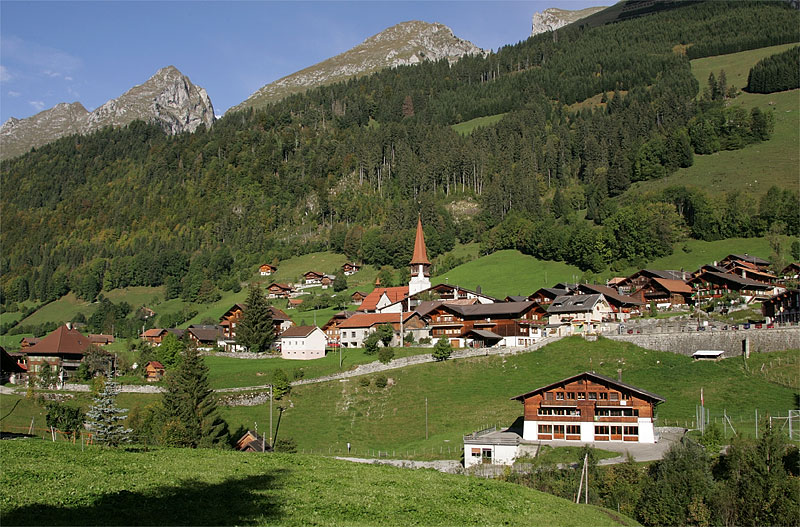
- Jaun village

- Coat of arms
- Location of Jaun
- Location within Switzerland Location within Canton of Fribourg
- Coordinates: 46°37′N 7°16′E
- Country: Switzerland
- Canton: Fribourg
- District: Gruyère

Government
  - Mayor: Syndic

Area
  - Total: 55.24 km^{2} (21.33 sq mi)
- Elevation: 1,015 m (3,330 ft)

Population (December 2020)
  - Total: 633
  - Density: 11.5/km^{2} (29.7/sq mi)
- Time zone: UTC+01:00 (CET)
  - Summer (DST): UTC+02:00 (CEST)
- Postal code: 1656
- SFOS number: 2138
- ISO 3166 code: CH-FR
- Surrounded by: Val-de-Charmey, Plaffeien, Saanen (BE), Boltigen (BE)
- Website: www.jaun.ch

Jaun (German pronunciation: [ˈjaʊ̯n]; French: Bellegarde [bɛlɡaʁd]; Arpitan: Bèlagouàrda [balaˈvwɛrda]) is a municipality in the district of Gruyère in the canton of Fribourg in Switzerland. It is the only German-speaking municipality in Gruyère.

== History ==
Jaun is first mentioned in 1228 as Balavarda. In 1397 it was mentioned as Youn.

== Geography ==
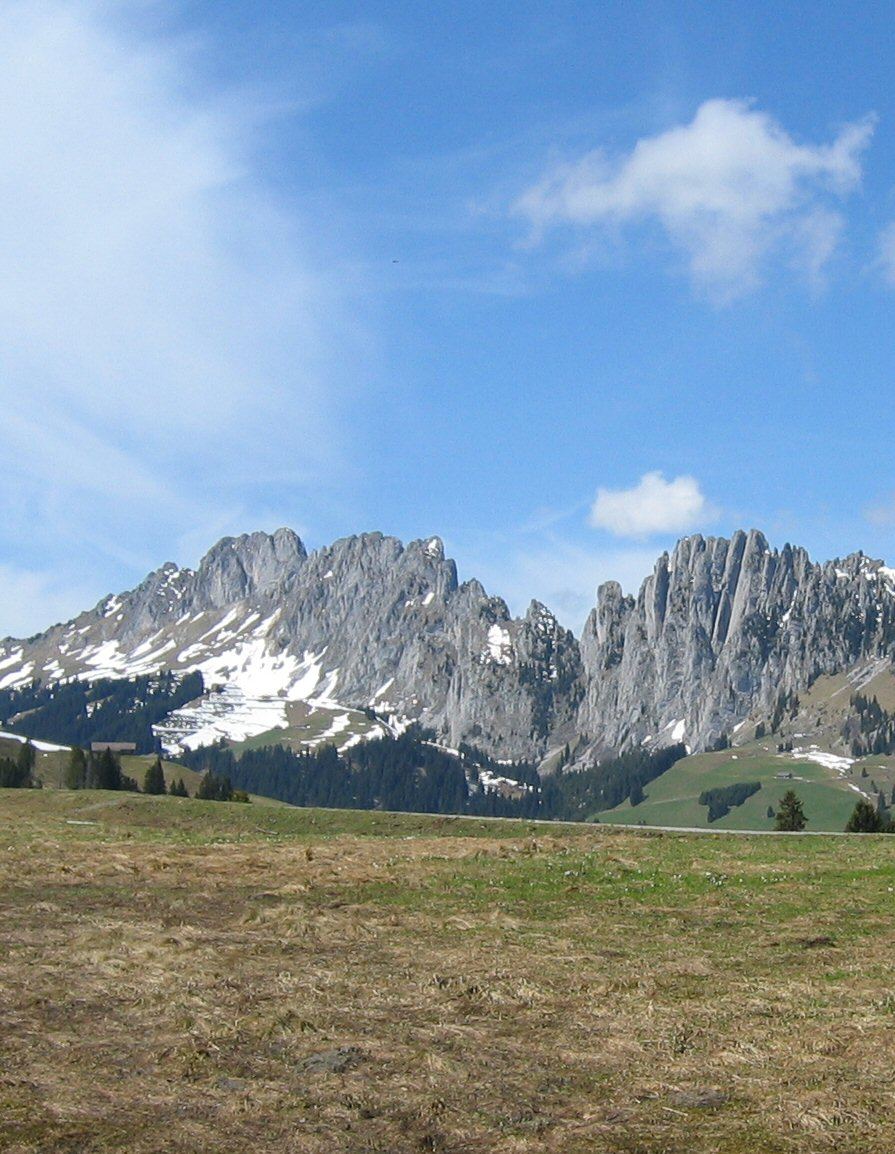
Gastlosen mountain in the Jaun Pass

Jaun has an area, as of 2009, of 55.2 square kilometers (21.3 mi^{2}). Of this area, 23.47 km^{2} (9.06 mi^{2}) or 42.5% is used for agricultural purposes, while 21.46 km^{2} (8.29 mi^{2}) or 38.9% is forested. Of the rest of the land, 0.95 km^{2} (0.37 mi^{2}) or 1.7% is settled (buildings or roads), 0.45 km^{2} (0.17 mi^{2}) or 0.8% is either rivers or lakes and 8.91 km^{2} (3.44 mi^{2}) or 16.1% is unproductive land.

Of the built up area, housing and buildings made up 0.5% and transportation infrastructure made up 1.0%. Out of the forested land, 33.4% of the total land area is heavily forested and 5.2% is covered with orchards or small clusters of trees. Of the agricultural land, 5.3% is pastures and 37.1% is used for alpine pastures. Of the water in the municipality, 0.3% is in lakes and 0.5% is in rivers and streams. Of the unproductive areas, 10.9% is unproductive vegetation and 5.2% is too rocky for vegetation.

The municipality is located in the Gruyère district, in the Jaun pass at an elevation of 1,027 m (3,369 ft). It consists of the linear village of Jaun and the hamlets of Im Fang (French: La Villette), Kappelboden, Weibelsried, Zur Eich and a number of scattered farm houses.

The Jaun Pass connects it with Boltigen in the canton of Bern. The Jaunbach ('Jaun Creek') or La Jogne in French passes west to Lac de Montsalvens.

== Coat of arms ==
The blazon of the municipal coat of arms is Sable a Saltire Argent.

== Demographics ==
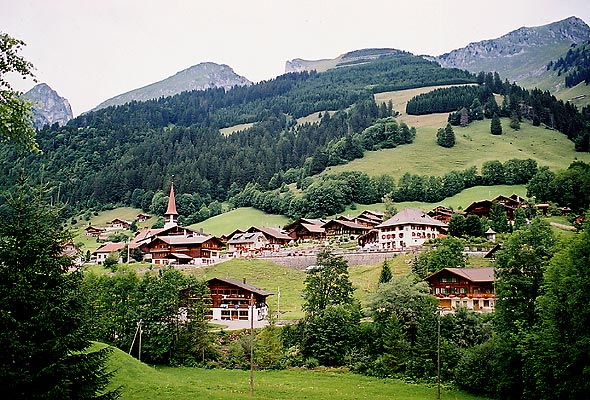
Jaun village

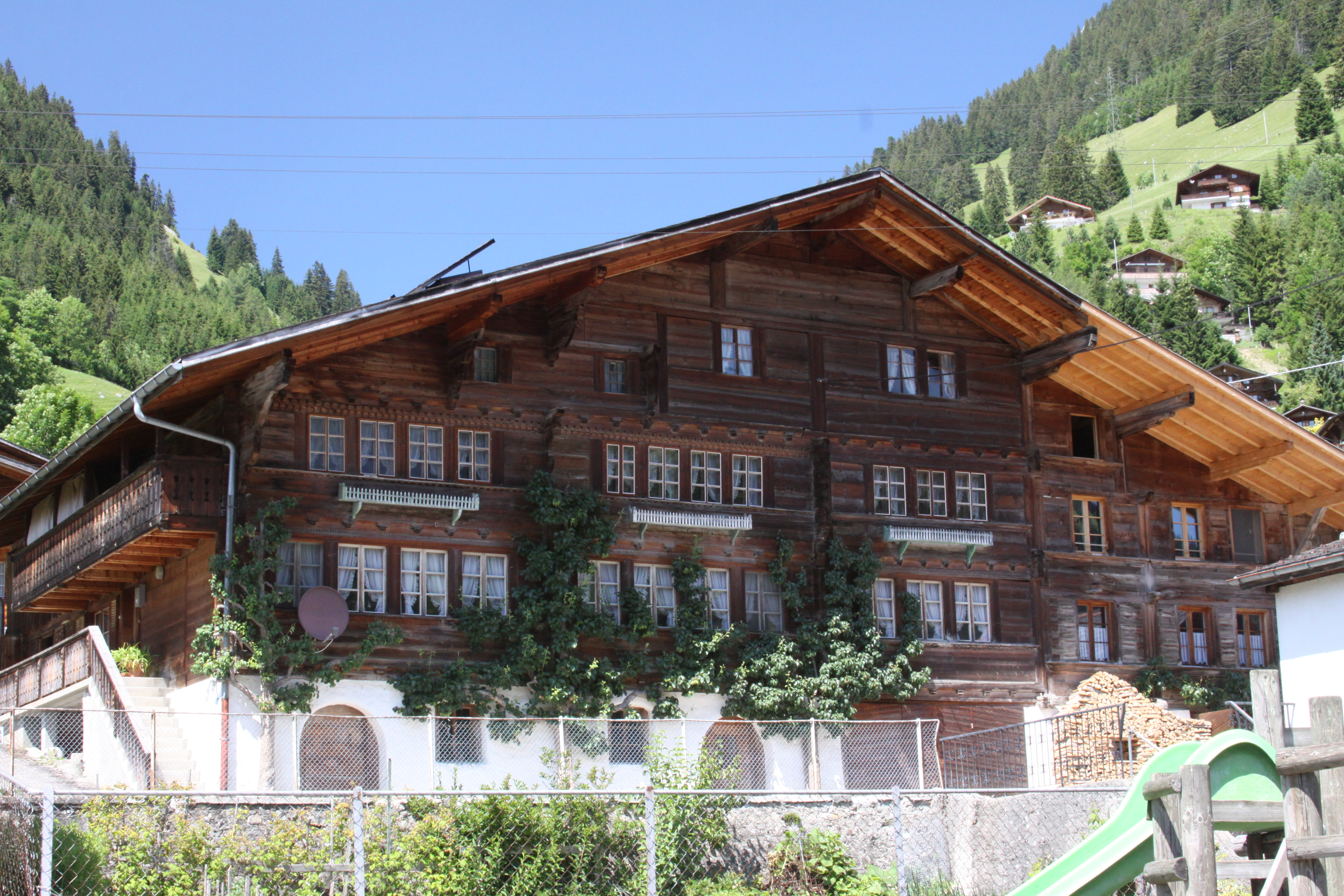
Statthalterhaus in Jaun

Jaun has a population (as of December 2020) of 633. As of 2008, 3.5% of the population are resident foreign nationals. Over the last 10 years (2000–2010) the population has changed at a rate of -5.7%. Migration accounted for -6.6%, while births and deaths accounted for 1.3%.

Most of the population (as of 2000) speaks German (621 or 89.5%) as their first language, French is the second most common (68 or 9.8%) and Serbo-Croatian is the third (2 or 0.3%).

As of 2008, the population was 51.7% male and 48.3% female. The population was made up of 332 Swiss men (49.5% of the population) and 15 (2.2%) non-Swiss men. There were 313 Swiss women (46.6%) and 11 (1.6%) non-Swiss women. Of the population in the municipality, 524 or about 75.5% were born in Jaun and lived there in 2000. There were 75 or 10.8% who were born in the same canton, while 53 or 7.6% were born somewhere else in Switzerland, and 26 or 3.7% were born outside of Switzerland.

As of 2000, children and teenagers (0–19 years old) make up 30.1% of the population, while adults (20–64 years old) make up 50.6% and seniors (over 64 years old) make up 19.3%.

As of 2000, there were 307 people who were single and never married in the municipality. There were 341 married individuals, 37 widows or widowers and 9 individuals who are divorced.

As of 2000, there were 254 private households in the municipality, and an average of 2.7 persons per household. There were 72 households that consist of only one person and 41 households with five or more people. In 2000, a total of 247 apartments (70.4% of the total) were permanently occupied, while 87 apartments (24.8%) were seasonally occupied and 17 apartments (4.8%) were empty. As of 2009, the construction rate of new housing units was 1.4 new units per 1000 residents. The vacancy rate for the municipality, in 2010, was 1.11%.

The historical population is given in the following chart:

== Notable people ==
- Anton Cottier, Swiss politician

== Politics ==
In the 2011 federal election the most popular party was the SVP which received 41.9% of the vote. The next three most popular parties were the CVP (24.1%), the FDP (10.7%) and the SP (7.5%). The SVP improved their position in Jaun rising to first, from second in 2007 (with 25.8%) The CVP moved from first in 2007 (with 53.1%) to second in 2011, the FDP moved from below fourth place in 2007 to third and the SPS moved from third in 2007 (with 5.8%) to fourth. A total of 253 votes were cast in this election, of which 7 or 2.8% were invalid.

In the 2015 federal election most popular party was the SVP which received 56.1% of the vote. The next three most popular parties were the CVP (19.2%), the FDP (10.2%), and the SP (5.5%). The SVP remained the most popular party, while the other parties saw slight variations of their vote share, but did not change positions.

In the 2019 federal election the most popular party was the SVP, receiving 43.2% of the vote. The next three most popular parties were the CVP (26.0%), the FDP (11.7%), and the SP (7.3%). The SVP remained the most popular party, while the other parties saw slight variations of their vote share, but did not change positions. Voter participation was 47.6%.

In the 2023 federal election the most popular party was the SVP, receiving 55.7% of the vote. The next three most popular parties were The Centre (21.9%), the FDP (9.4%), and the SP (6.2%). The SVP remained the most popular party, while the other parties saw slight variations of their vote share, but did not change positions. The Centre was formed by a merger between the CVP and the Conservative Democratic Party of Switzerland in 2021. Voter participation was 54.4% (+6.8% compared to 2019).

== Economy ==
As of 2010, Jaun had an unemployment rate of 0.9%. As of 2008, there were 85 people employed in the primary economic sector and about 30 businesses involved in this sector. 86 people were employed in the secondary sector and there were 10 businesses in this sector. 53 people were employed in the tertiary sector, with 20 businesses in this sector. There were 287 residents of the municipality who were employed in some capacity, of which females made up 35.2% of the workforce.

In 2008 the total number of full-time equivalent jobs was 170. The number of jobs in the primary sector was 51, of which 47 were in agriculture and 5 were in forestry or lumber production. The number of jobs in the secondary sector was 81 of which 26 or (32.1%) were in manufacturing and 53 (65.4%) were in construction. The number of jobs in the tertiary sector was 38. In the tertiary sector; 3 or 7.9% were in wholesale or retail sales or the repair of motor vehicles, 4 or 10.5% were in the movement and storage of goods, 18 or 47.4% were in a hotel or restaurant, 4 or 10.5% were the insurance or financial industry, 1 was a technical professional or scientist, 5 or 13.2% were in education.

In 2000, there were 23 workers who commuted into the municipality and 118 workers who commuted away. The municipality is a net exporter of workers, with about 5.1 workers leaving the municipality for every one entering. Of the working population, 9.1% used public transportation to get to work, and 61% used a private car.

== Religion ==
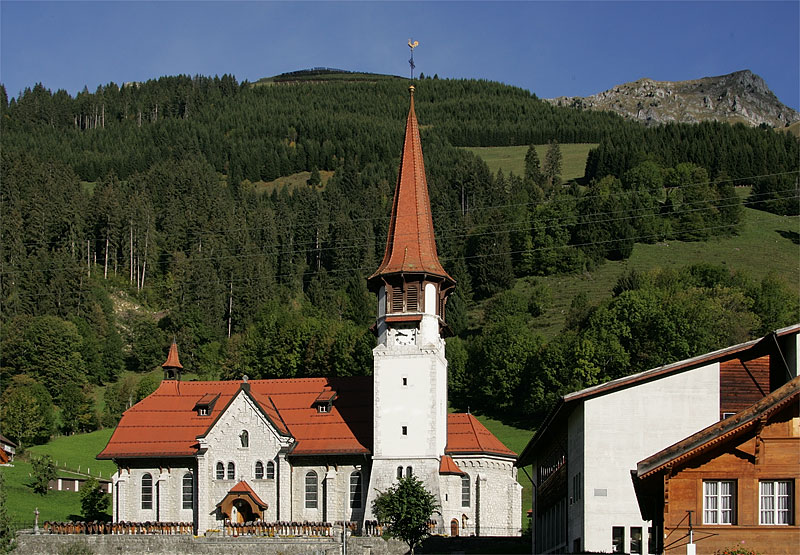
New Church in Jaun

From the 2000 census, 626 or 90.2% were Roman Catholic, while 32 or 4.6% belonged to the Swiss Reformed Church. Of the rest of the population, there were 2 members of an Orthodox church (or about 0.29% of the population). There were 7 (or about 1.01% of the population) who were Islamic. 8 (or about 1.15% of the population) belonged to no church, are agnostic or atheist, and 19 individuals (or about 2.74% of the population) did not answer the question.

== Weather ==
Jaun has an average of 151.5 days of rain or snow per year and on average receives 1,717 mm (67.6 in) of precipitation. The wettest month is June during which time Jaun receives an average of 184 mm (7.2 in) of rain or snow. During this month there is precipitation for an average of 15.2 days. The month with the most days of precipitation is May, with an average of 15.5, but with only 149 mm (5.9 in) of rain or snow. The driest month of the year is October with an average of 113 mm (4.4 in) of precipitation over 9 days.

== Education ==
In Jaun about 172 or (24.8%) of the population have completed non-mandatory upper secondary education, and 30 or (4.3%) have completed additional higher education (either university or a Fachhochschule). Of the 30 who completed tertiary schooling, 73.3% were Swiss men, 16.7% were Swiss women.

The Canton of Fribourg school system provides one year of non-obligatory Kindergarten, followed by six years of Primary school. This is followed by three years of obligatory lower Secondary school where the students are separated according to ability and aptitude. Following the lower Secondary students may attend a three or four year optional upper Secondary school. The upper Secondary school is divided into gymnasium (university preparatory) and vocational programs. After they finish the upper Secondary program, students may choose to attend a Tertiary school or continue their apprenticeship.

During the 2010-11 school year, there were a total of 96 students attending 7 classes in Jaun. A total of 121 students from the municipality attended any school, either in the municipality or outside of it. There was one kindergarten class with a total of 15 students in the municipality. The municipality had 3 primary classes and 55 students. During the same year, there were 3 lower secondary classes with a total of 26 students. There were no upper Secondary classes or vocational classes, but there were 3 upper Secondary students and 23 upper Secondary vocational students who attended classes in another municipality. The municipality had no non-university Tertiary classes. who attended classes in another municipality.

As of 2000, there were 47 students from Jaun who attended schools outside the municipality.
