= Elsighorn =

Mountain in Switzerland

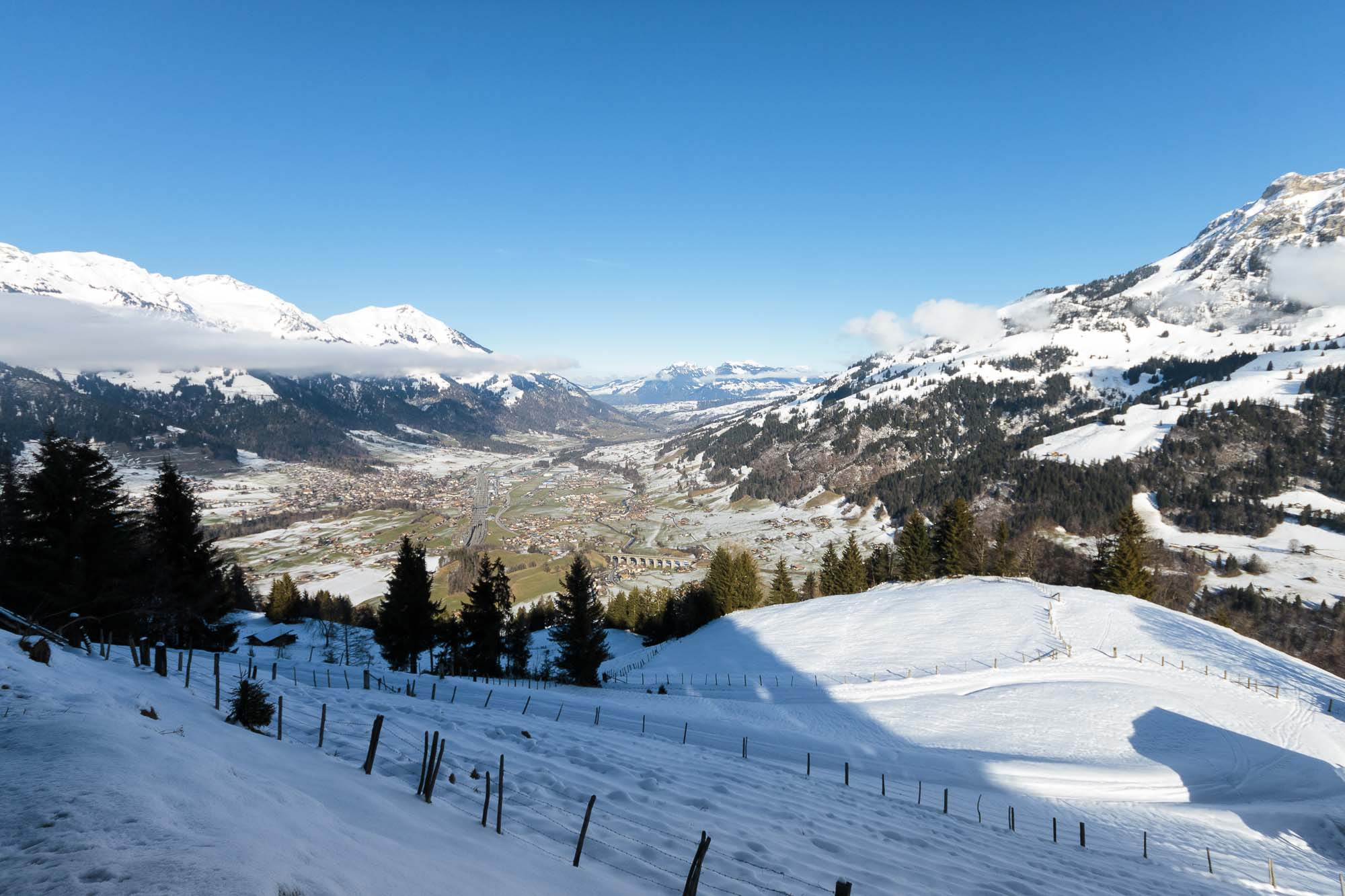
- View from Elsighorn to Frutigen

Highest point
- Elevation: 2,341 m (7,680 ft)
- Prominence: 296 m (971 ft)
- Parent peak: Finsteraarhorn
- Coordinates: 46°32′2.7″N 7°38′24.8″E

Geography
- Location within Switzerland
- Location: Bern, Switzerland
- Parent range: Bernese Alps

The Elsighorn is a mountain in the Bernese Alps, overlooking Kandergrund in the Bernese Oberland.
