= Schafberg (Boltigen) =

Mountain in Switzerland

- Location within Switzerland

Highest point
- Elevation: 2,239 m (7,346 ft)
- Prominence: 731 m (2,398 ft)
- Parent peak: Dent de Savigny
- Isolation: 11.8 km (7.3 mi)
- Coordinates: 46°38′13″N 7°19′01″E

Geography
- Location: Fribourg/Bern, Switzerland
- Parent range: Fribourg Alps

The Schafberg is a mountain peak above Boltigen located on the border between the cantons of Fribourg and Bern, north of Jaun. With a height 2,239 metres above sea level, it is the highest summit on the range lying north of the Jaun Pass. It is also the most isolated mountain in the canton of Fribourg.

== See also ==
- List of most isolated mountains of Switzerland
