= Wendenhorn =

Mountain in Switzerland

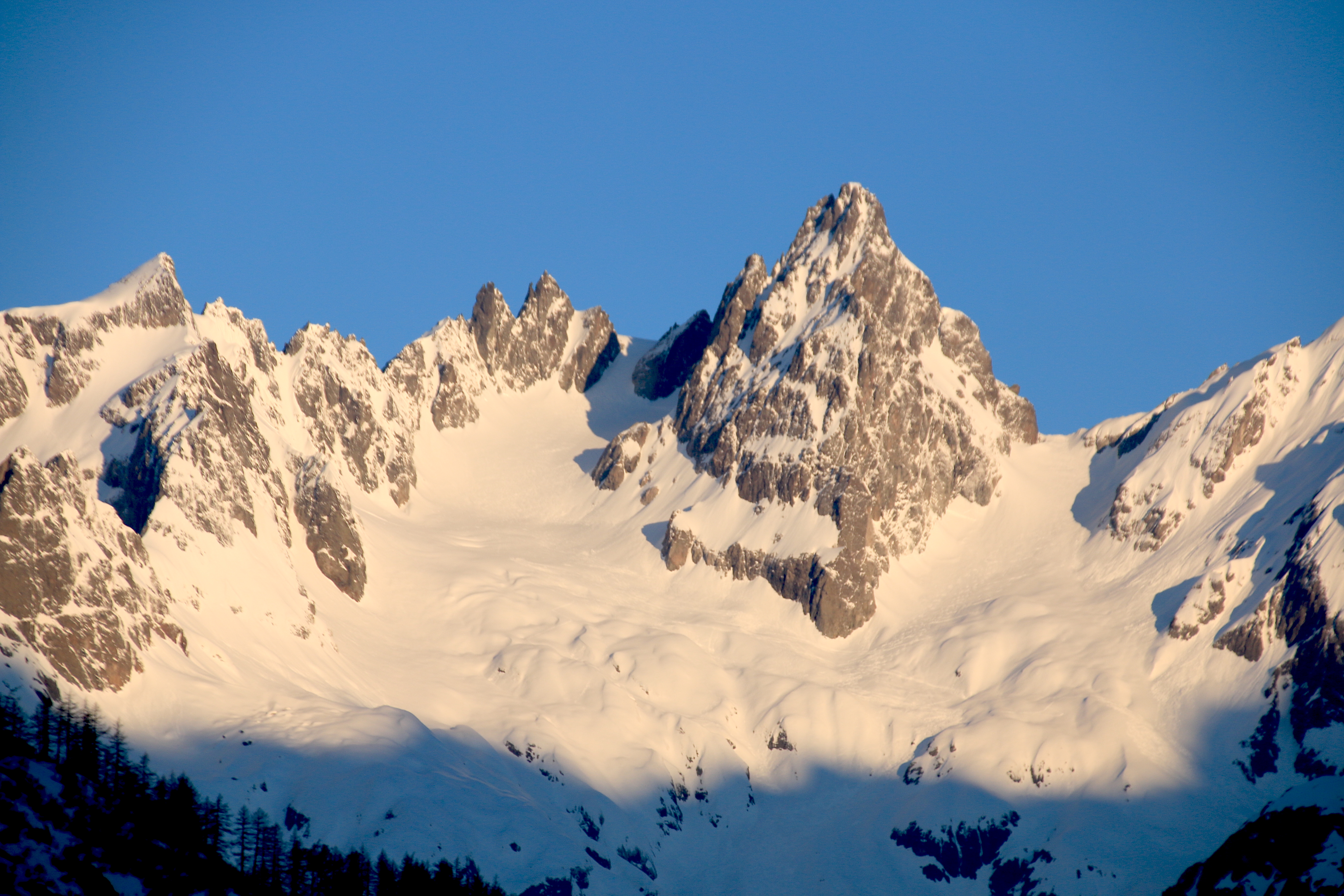
- Wendenhorn seen from Fürlauwi; 46.730002°N 8.542587°E

Highest point
- Elevation: 3,023 m (9,918 ft)
- Prominence: 311 m (1,020 ft)
- Parent peak: Gross Spannort
- Listing: Alpine mountains above 3000 m
- Coordinates: 46°45′13.9″N 8°26′36.8″E

Geography
- Location within Switzerland
- Location: Bern/Uri, Switzerland
- Parent range: Urner Alps

The Wendenhorn is a mountain of the Urner Alps, located on the border between the Swiss cantons of Bern and Uri. It is located approximately halfway between the Titlis and the Susten Pass.

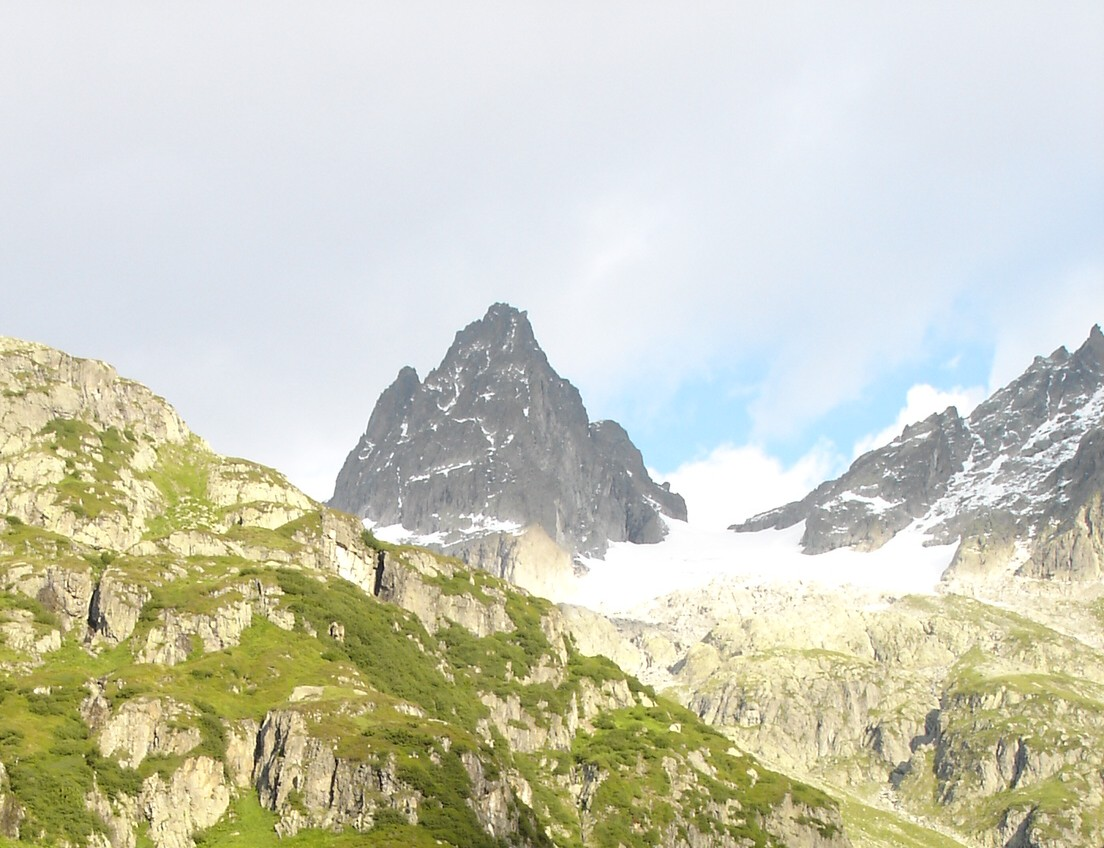
View from Sustenbrüggli (east side)
