= Obersimmental-Saanen (administrative district) =

Coordinates: 46°29′N 7°16′E

Obersimmental-Saanen District Verwaltungskreis Obersimmental-Saanen
- District
- Country: Switzerland
- Canton: Bern
- Capital: Saanen

Area
  - Total: 575 km^{2} (222 sq mi)

Population (2008)
  - Total: 16,784
  - Density: 29.2/km^{2} (75.6/sq mi)
- Time zone: UTC+1 (CET)
  - Summer (DST): UTC+2 (CEST)
- Municipalities: 7

Obersimmental-Saanen District in the Canton of Bern was created on 1 January 2010. It is part of the Oberland administrative region. It contains 7 municipalities with an area of 574.88 km^{2} (221.96 sq mi) and a population (as of December 2008) of 16,784.

Flag	Name	Population (31 December 2020)	Area in km^{2}
Boltigen	Boltigen	1,249	77.01
Gsteig bei Gstaad	Gsteig bei Gstaad	981	62.37
Lauenen	Lauenen	828	58.71
Lenk	Lenk	2,314	126.18
Saanen	Saanen	6,836	119.71
St. Stephan	St. Stephan	1,310	57.79
Zweisimmen	Zweisimmen	3,032	73.11
	Total (7)	16,550	574.88
