= Mährenhorn =

Mountain in Switzerland

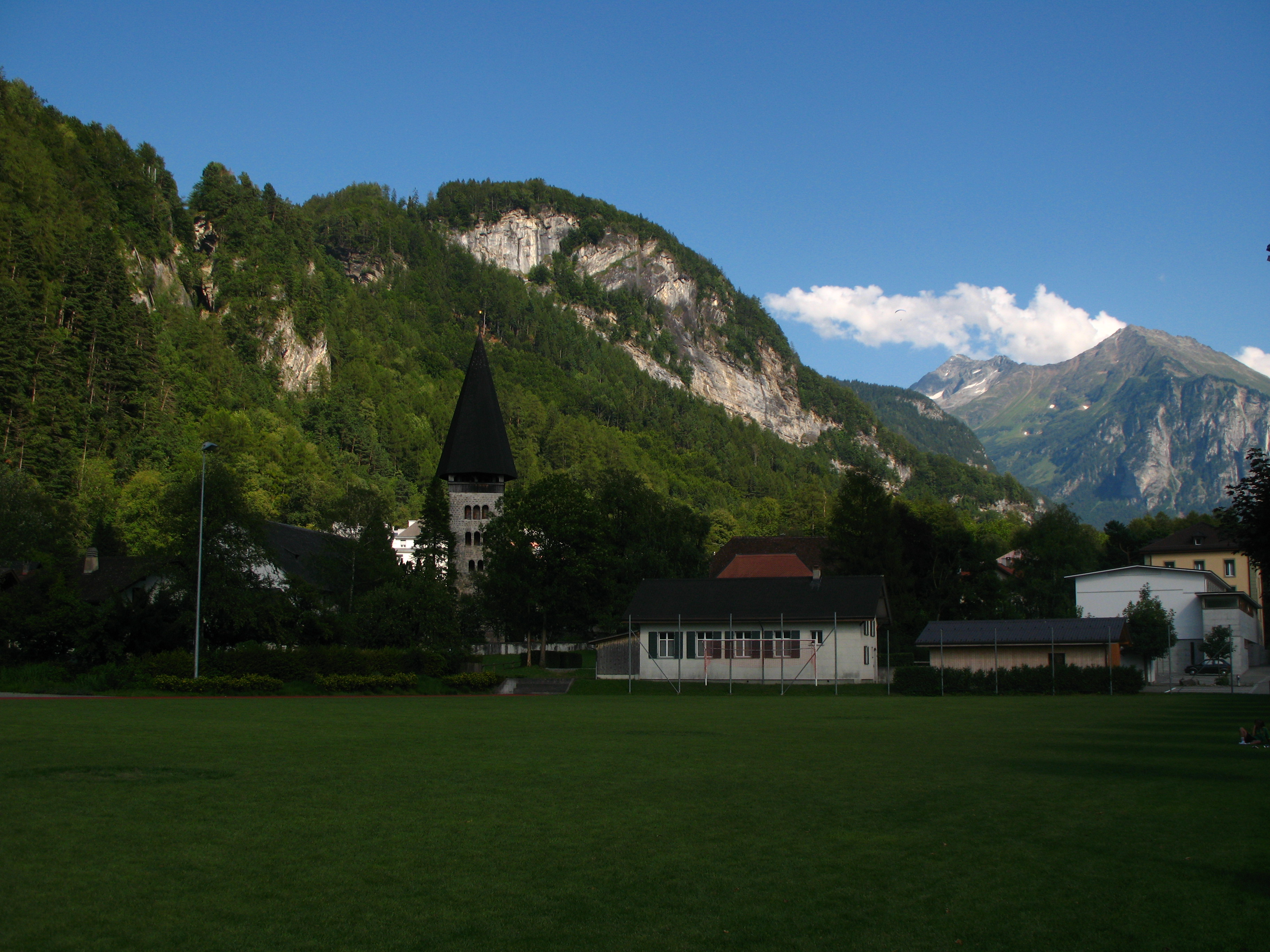
- The Mährenhorn (right) from Meiringen

Highest point
- Elevation: 2,923 m (9,590 ft)
- Prominence: 355 m (1,165 ft)
- Parent peak: Dammastock
- Coordinates: 46°41′30.4″N 8°18′39.4″E

Geography
- Location within Switzerland
- Location: Bern, Switzerland
- Parent range: Berner Alps

The Mährenhorn is a mountain in the Berner Alps, overlooking Innertkirchen in the Bernese Oberland. It lies west of Triftsee, near the Trift Glacier.
