= Schwändiblueme =

Mountain in Switzerland

- Location within Switzerland

Highest point
- Elevation: 1,396 m (4,580 ft)
- Prominence: 320 m (1,050 ft)
- Parent peak: Sigriswiler Rothorn
- Coordinates: 46°44′49″N 7°42′40″E

Geography
- Location: Bern, Switzerland
- Parent range: Emmental Alps

The Schwändibleme (also spelled Schwendiblueme; 1,396 m) is a mountain of the Emmental Alps, overlooking Lake Thun in the canton of Bern. The mountain is located between Teuffenthal, Schwendi and Schwanden.

The mountain is almost completely wooded. A slightly lower summit (1,392 m) named simply Blume is located east of the main summit. It includes an observation tower.
