= Wistätthorn =

Mountain in Switzerland

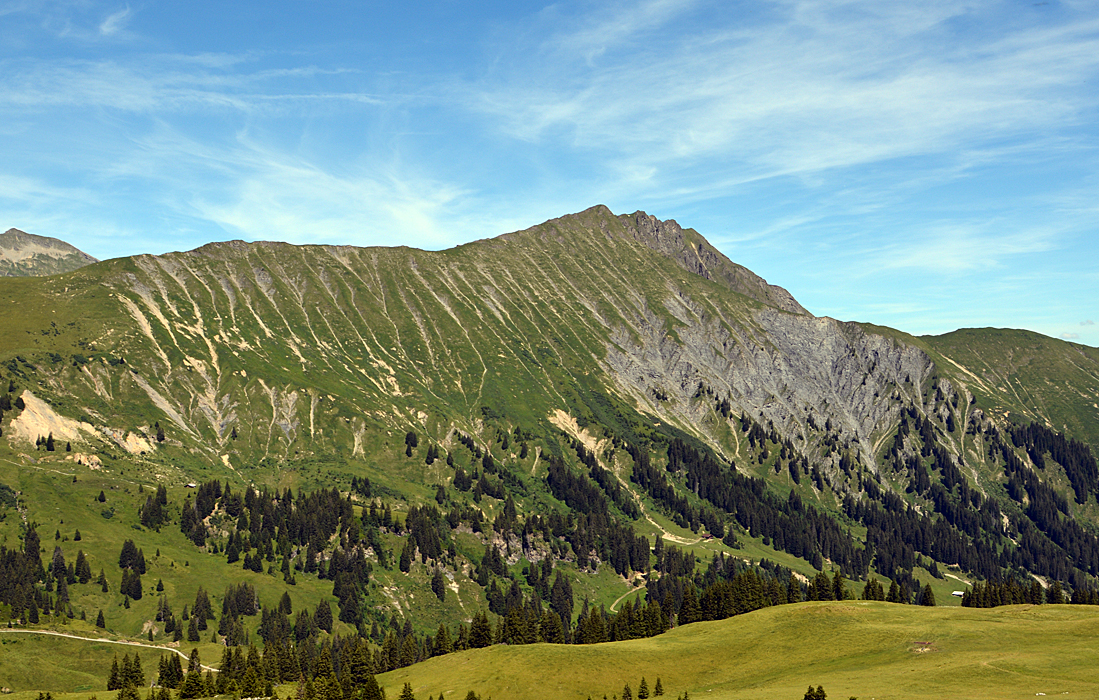

Highest point
- Elevation: 2,362 m (7,749 ft)
- Prominence: 370 m (1,210 ft)
- Coordinates: 46°27′14.6″N 7°23′10.5″E

Geography
- Location within Switzerland
- Location: Bern, Switzerland
- Parent range: Bernese Alps

The Wistätthorn (also spelled Wistätthore) is a mountain of the Bernese Alps, located west of Lenk in the Bernese Oberland.
