= Männliflue =

Mountain in Switzerland

- Location within Switzerland

Highest point
- Elevation: 2,652 m (8,701 ft)
- Prominence: 374 m (1,227 ft)
- Parent peak: Albristhorn
- Coordinates: 46°33′4.7″N 7°32′47.7″E

Geography
- Location: Bern, Switzerland
- Parent range: Bernese Alps

The Männliflue is a mountain of the Bernese Alps, located near Adelboden in the Bernese Oberland, A state of Switzerland. It lies between the valleys of Diemtigen and Adelboden.
