= Giferspitz =

Mountain in Switzerland

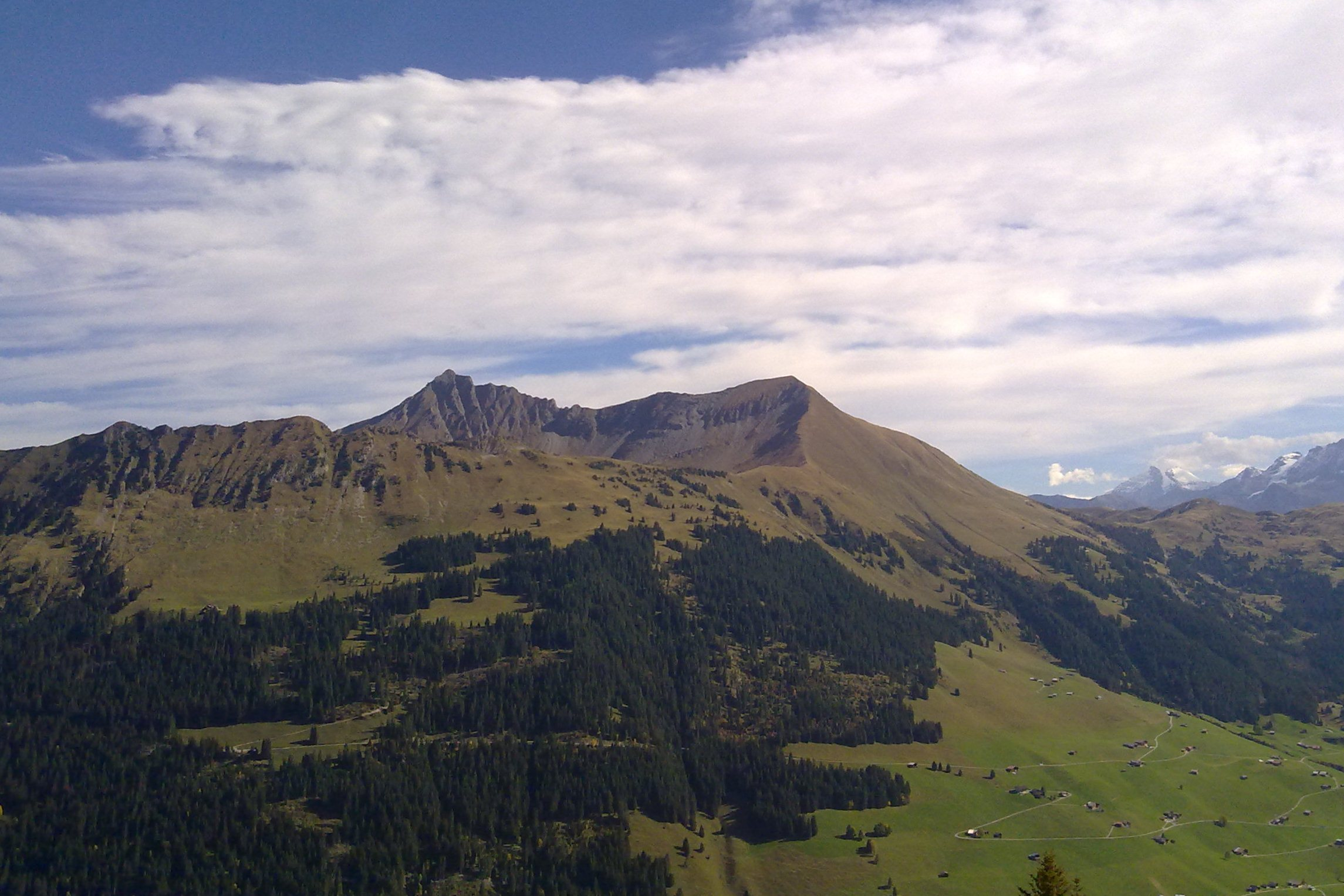
- View from the Wispile (west side)

Highest point
- Elevation: 2,542 m (8,340 ft)
- Prominence: 556 m (1,824 ft)
- Coordinates: 46°27′4.4″N 7°21′12.2″E

Geography
- Location within Switzerland
- Location: Bern, Switzerland
- Parent range: Bernese Alps

The Giferspitz is a 2,542 metres high mountain in the western Bernese Alps, overlooking Gstaad in the canton of Berne. It is the highest summit of the massif between Gstaad and Lenk, north of the Wildhorn. The summit can be accessed via a trail on the northern side.
