= Ritzlihorn =

Mountain in Switzerland

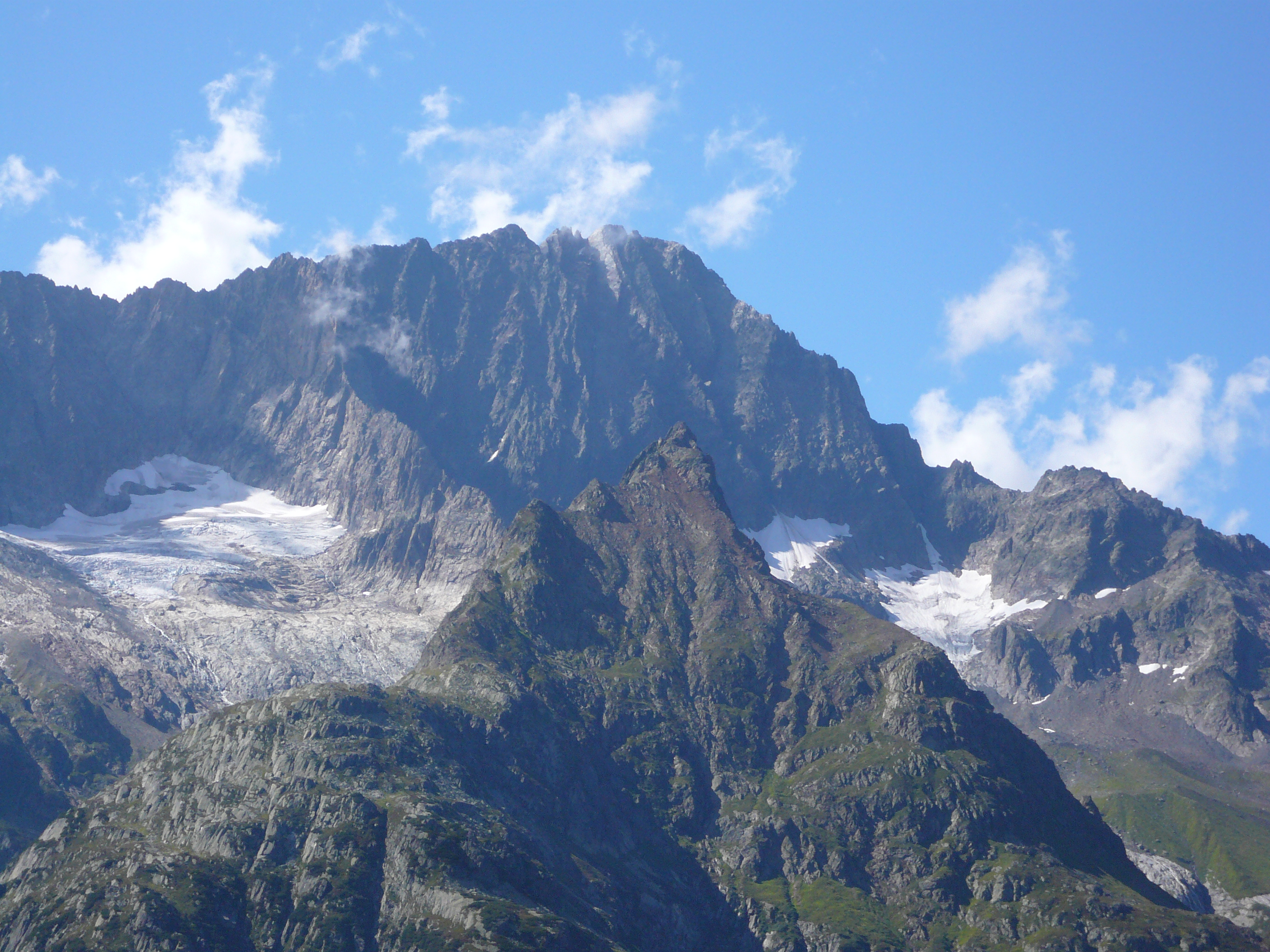
- Ritzlihorn seen from Gelmersee (in the foreground is the Stampfhoren)

Highest point
- Elevation: 3,277 m (10,751 ft)
- Prominence: 322 m (1,056 ft)
- Parent peak: Finsteraarhorn
- Listing: Alpine mountains above 3000 m
- Coordinates: 46°38′0.5″N 8°15′31.4″E

Geography
- Location within Switzerland
- Location: Bern, Switzerland
- Parent range: Bernese Alps

Climbing
- First ascent: 1816 by Johann Jakob Frey

The Ritzlihorn (3,277 m) is a mountain of the Bernese Alps, overlooking Handegg in the canton of Bern. It lies on the range east of the Gauli Glacier and north of the Bächlistock.
