= Jaun Pass =

Mountain pass in Switzerland

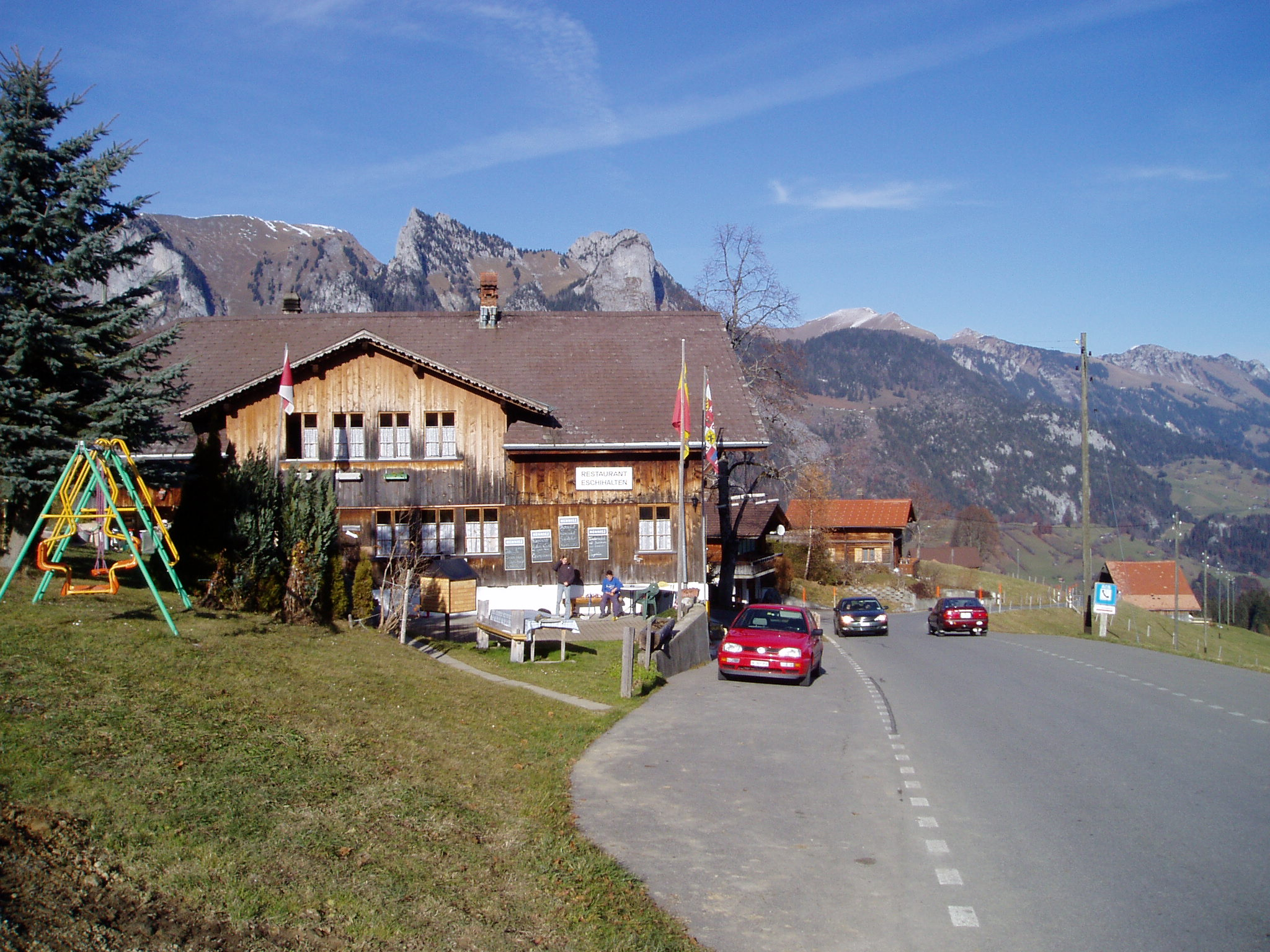
- Jaun Pass

- Location within Switzerland
- Elevation: 1,508 m (4,948 ft)
- Traversed by: Road

Third Approach
- Location: Bern, Switzerland
- Range: Alps
- Coordinates: 46°35′27″N 07°20′20″E

Jaun Pass (German: Jaunpass, French: col de Bellegarde) is a high mountain pass (el. 1508 m.) in the Swiss Alps linking Charmey and Jaun in the canton of Fribourg with Reidenbach (part of the municipality of Boltigen) in the canton of Bern. The pass itself is located within the canton of Berne.

The pass road was completed in 1878.

== See also ==
- List of highest paved roads in Europe
- List of mountain passes
- List of the highest Swiss passes
