= Ochsen =

Mountain in canton of Bern' Switzerland

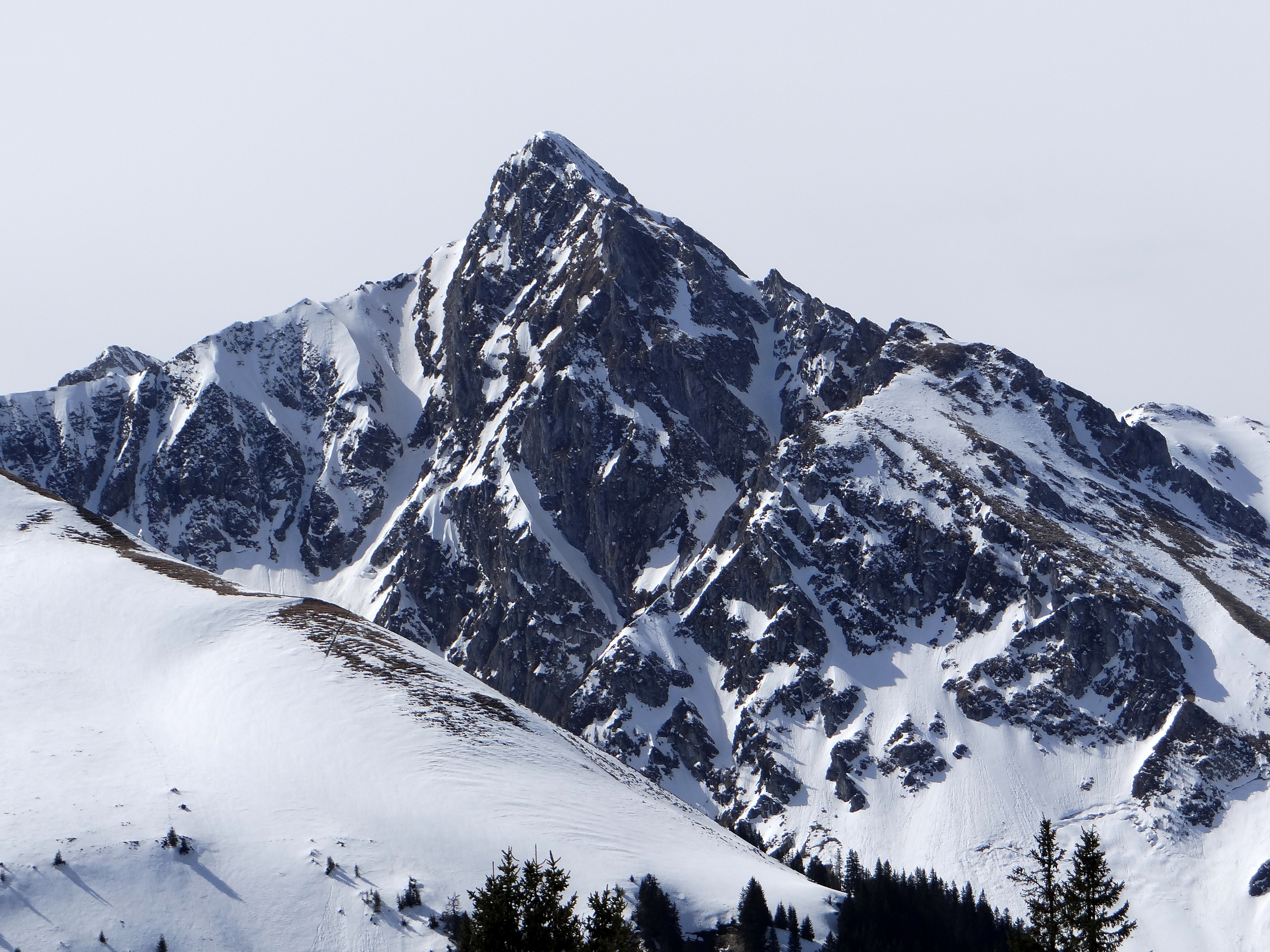

Highest point
- Elevation: 2,188 m (7,178 ft)
- Prominence: 384 m (1,260 ft)
- Parent peak: Stockhorn
- Coordinates: 46°41′55.5″N 7°25′7″E

Geography
- Location within Switzerland
- Location: Bern, Switzerland
- Parent range: Bernese Alps

Climbing
- First ascent: 23.02.1698
- Easiest route: Louigrat (T3)

The Ochsen (or Ochse) is a 2,188.4 metres high mountain in the Bernese Alps, overlooking Schwefelbergbad in the canton of Bern. It is the highest mountain of the Gantrisch chain. The Louigrat is the easiest path (T3, slightly exposed at the top: very steep rocky passages), taking approximately 3 hours. Another path goes via the north ridge via Chli Ochsen (T4, steep, rocky and slippery). There is a memorial just below the small summit area.
