= Simmental =

Alpine valley in Switzerland

Coordinates: 46.55°N 7.36°E

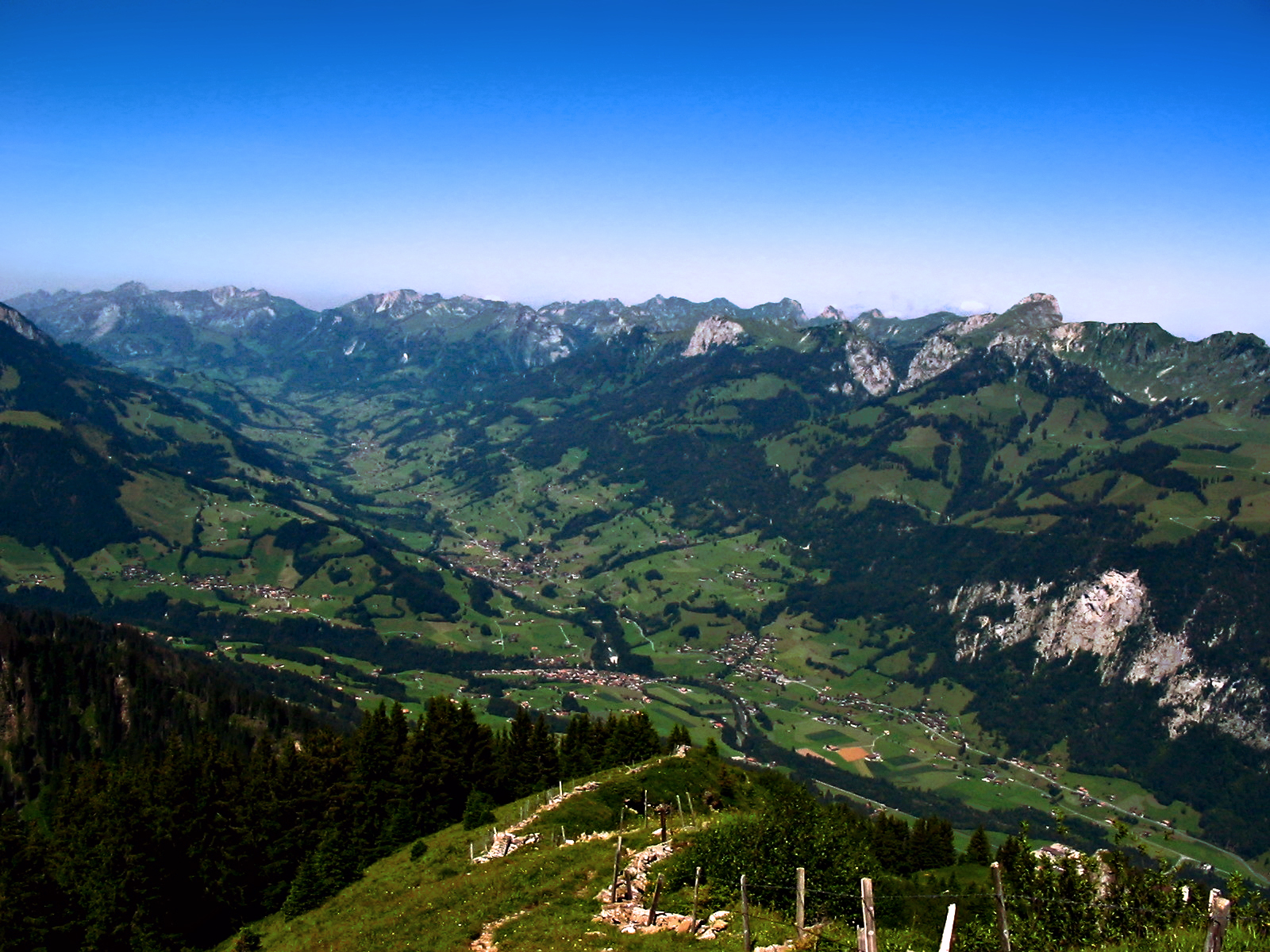
View of the Simmental

The Simmental (German pronunciation: [ˈzɪməntaːl]; English: Simme Valley) is an alpine valley in the Bernese Oberland of Switzerland. It expands from Lenk to Boltigen, in a more or less south-north direction (Obersimmental), and from there to the valley exit at Wimmis near Spiez it takes a west-east orientation (Niedersimmental). It comprises the municipalities of Lenk, St. Stephan, Zweisimmen, Boltigen, Oberwil, Därstetten, Erlenbach, Diemtigen and Wimmis. The Simme flows through the valley.

Some villages play a role in the winter tourism of the region of Bern, such as Lenk or Zweisimmen. From Zweisimmen the resorts of Gstaad and Château-d'Œx can be reached.

Further up is the Jaun Pass, which is crossed to go from Bulle to Fribourg, as well as the Hahnenmoos, which links Lenk with Adelboden.

== See also ==
- Erlenbach horse
