= Frutigen =

- Municipality
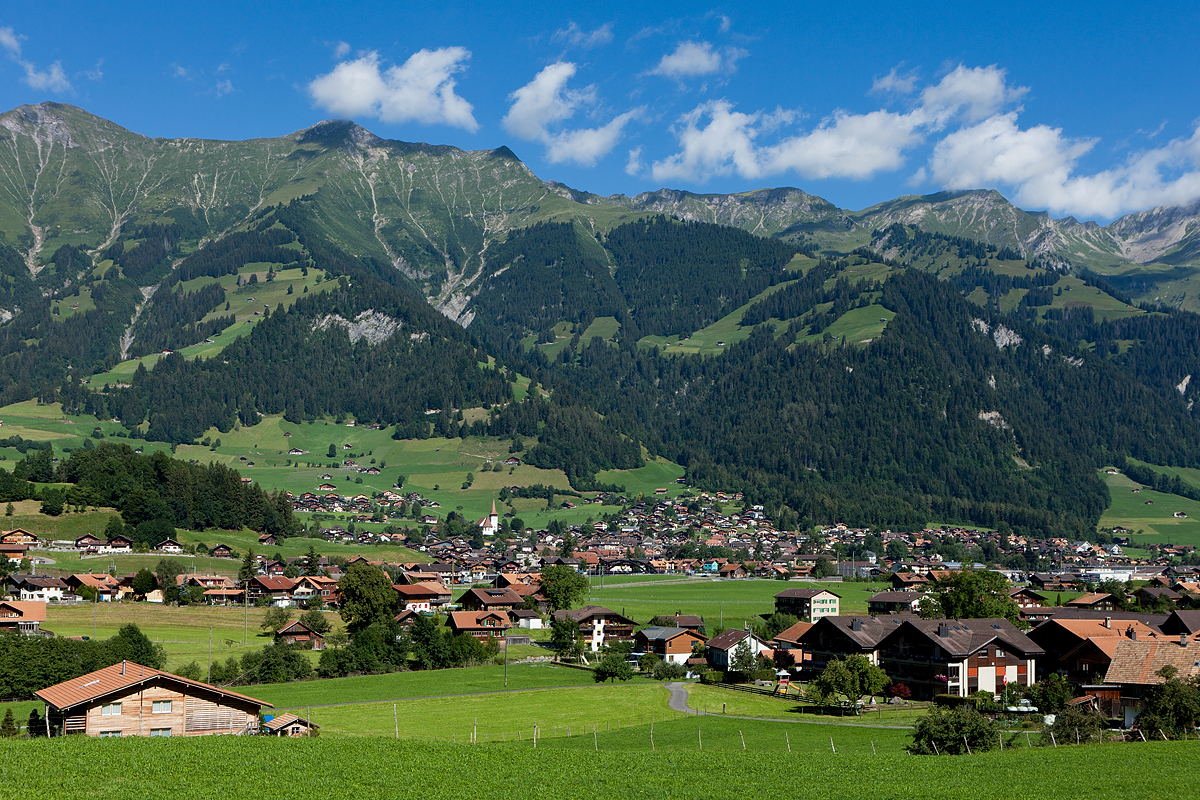

- Flag Coat of arms
- Location of Frutigen
- Location within Switzerland Location within Canton of Bern
- Coordinates: 46°35′12″N 7°39′49″E
- Country: Switzerland
- Canton: Bern
- District: Frutigen-Niedersimmental

Government
  - Executive: Gemeinderat with 9 members
  - Mayor: Gemeindepräsident(in); Thomas Gyseler FDP/PLR (as of 2026)

Area
  - Total: 71.8 km^{2} (27.7 sq mi)
- Elevation: 800 m (2,600 ft)

Population (December 2020)
  - Total: 6,967
  - Density: 97.0/km^{2} (251/sq mi)
- Time zone: UTC+01:00 (CET)
  - Summer (DST): UTC+02:00 (CEST)
- Postal code: 3714
- SFOS number: 563
- ISO 3166 code: CH-BE
- Surrounded by: Adelboden, Diemtigen, Kandergrund, Kandersteg, Reichenbach im Kandertal
- Twin towns: Teteven (Bulgaria)
- Website: www.frutigen.ch

Frutigen (Swiss Standard German pronunciation: [ˈfruːtɪɡn̩]) is a municipality in the Bernese Oberland area of the Swiss canton of Bern. It is the capital of the Frutigen-Niedersimmental administrative district.

== History ==
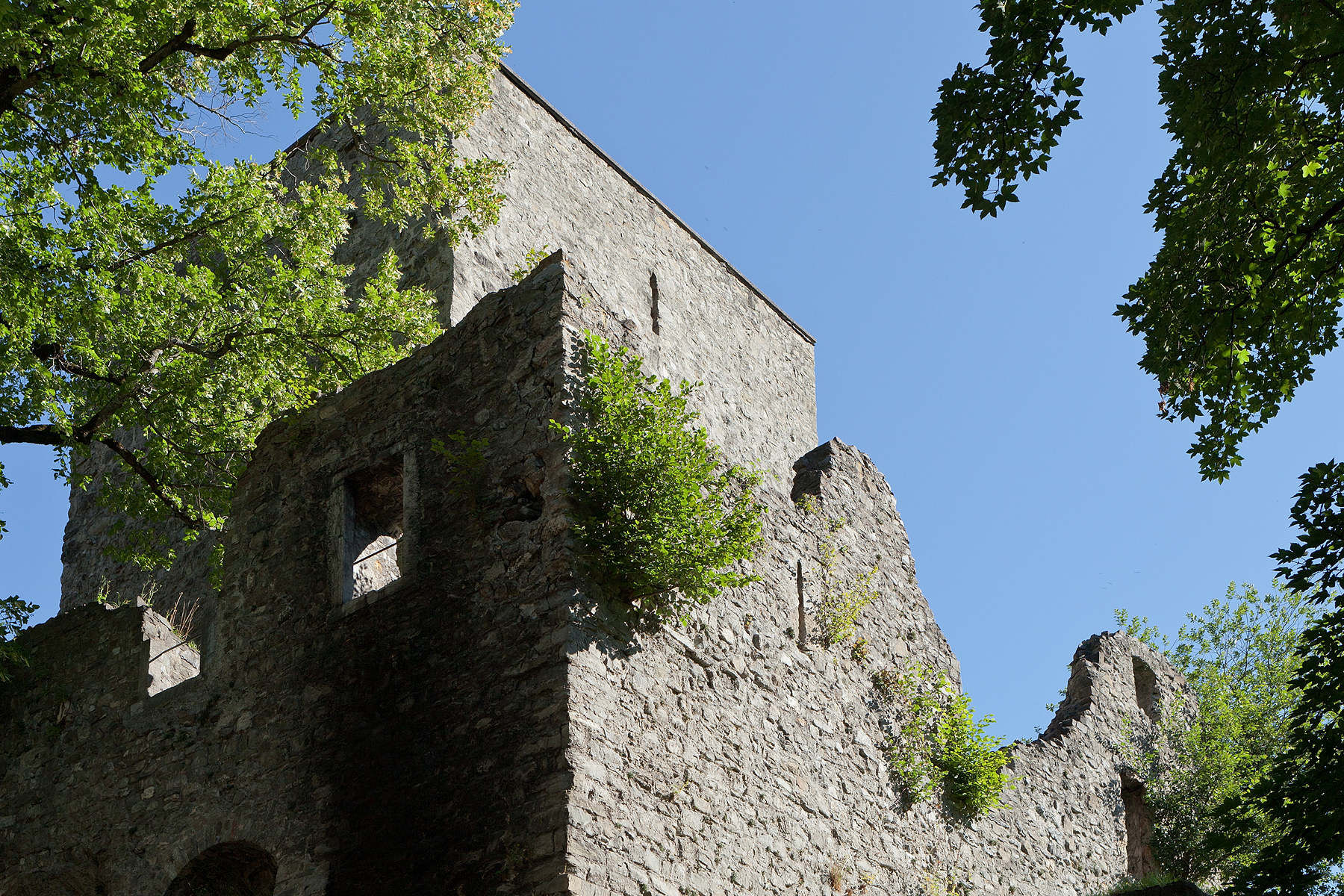
Ruins of Tellenburg Castle

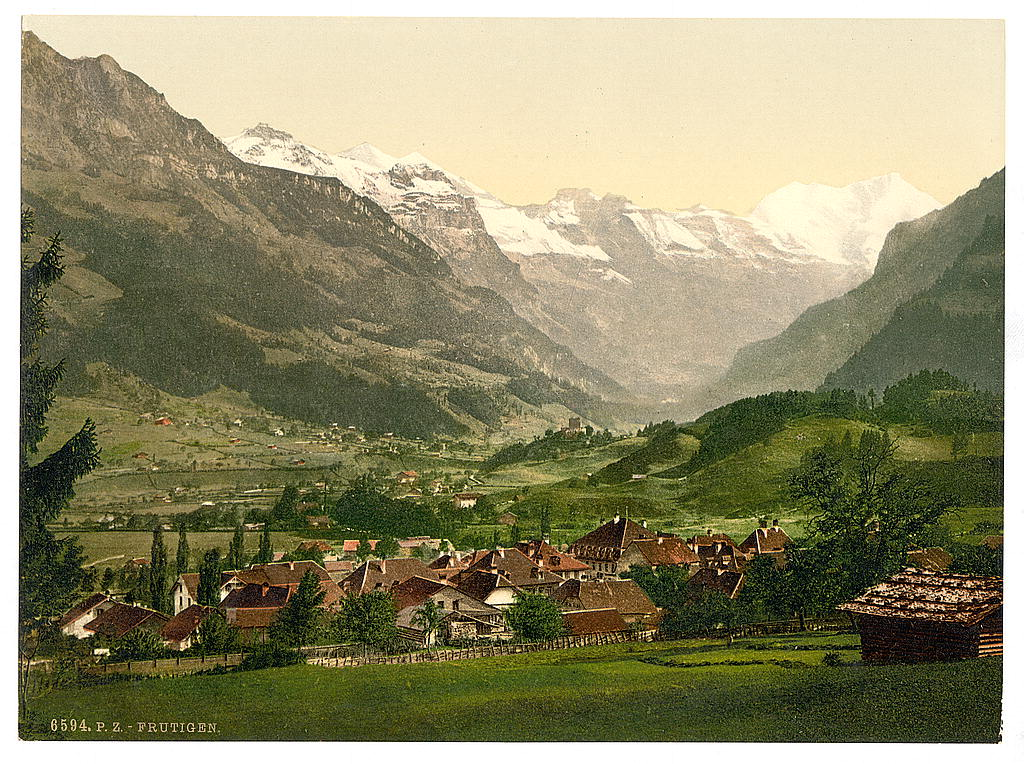
Photochrome postcard of Frutigen

Aerial view (1967)

The area around Frutigen may have been settled since possibly the Bronze Age or Roman Empire times. It was first mentioned in 1234 as Frutingen.

During the Middle Ages there were three castles in the modern municipal border; Halten, Tellenburg and Bürg. By 1260 the scattered farmers of the valley floor had formed a political and business association. The association had its own seal in 1263 and in 1340 it negotiated a peace with an association in the Obersimmental. In 1391, the village of Frutigen gained the right to hold the low court in the village. In 1400, the expanding city-state of Bern annexed the entire valley. However, the association was powerful enough to force Bern to make concessions. The residents of the valley were freed from the obligation to pay taxes or provide labor for local lords and their soldiers marched under their own banner. The valley held onto these freedoms until 1854.

The village church, Saint Quirinus' church, was first mentioned in 1228 as one of the twelve churches around Lake Thun in the Strättliger Chronicle. However, this church was built over the foundation of an older church. The earliest church was probably built in the 8th or 9th century above 7th or 8th century tombs. The original church was replaced in the 11th or 12th century. That church was rebuilt in 1421. The current church was built on the ruins of the 1421 church following a fire in 1727. In 1528, Bern adopted the Protestant Reformation and began imposing it on the Canton. Frutigen, like the rest of the Bernese Oberland, resisted the new faith, but adopted it after the Interlaken uprising was suppressed. The large parish of Frutigen was divided several times but still includes the villages of Schwandi and Wengi which are both part of the municipality of Reichenbach. A Roman Catholic parish church was built in 1959. The Catholic Frutigen parish covers approximately the same area as the medieval parish.

The valley had always profited from trade over the Gemmi and Lötschen Passes. A sust or warehouse and mountain pass way station was built in Kanderbrück in the 16th century, though similar buildings existed since at least the Middle Ages. During the 16th century the local economy also began to change. Instead of raising a variety of crops, the local farmers began to specialize in raising cattle for export. The village now had to import grain from the Swiss Plateau. Around 1850, the economy shifted again as lace and watch factories moved into the valley. A match stick factory also opened in Frutigen in 1850.

The first mail coach between Thun and Frutigen began operations in 1814. The Spiez-Frutigen railroad opened in 1901, followed by the Bern–Lötschberg–Simplon railway in 1913. In 1917 the Postauto began regular service between Frutigen and Adelboden. The railroad and improved roads allowed industry and tourism to flourish in the municipality.

== Geography ==
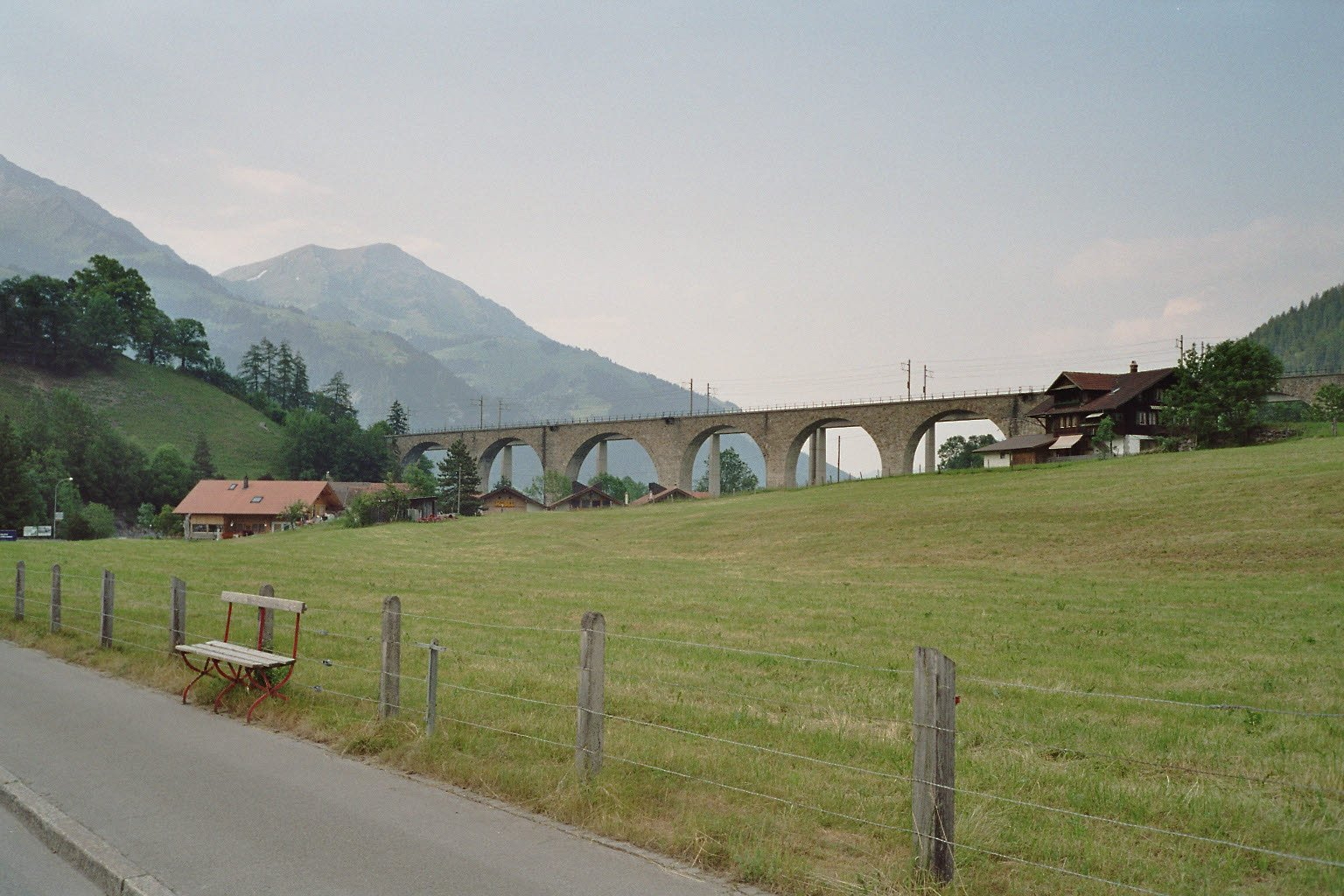
Two bridges of the Lötschbergbahn train line in Frutigen

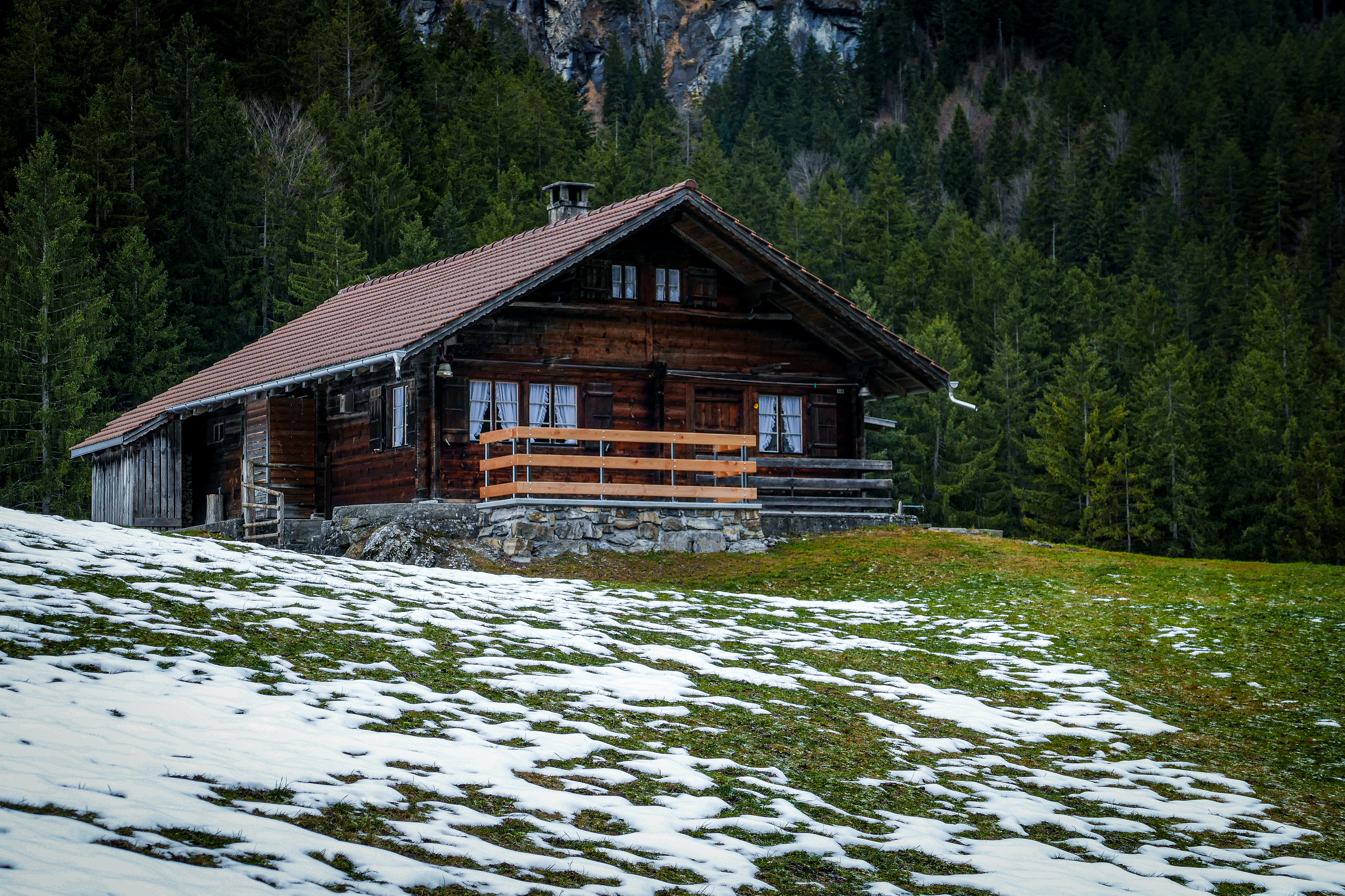
Swiss chalet in the Frutigen area

Frutigen has an area of 72.28 km^{2} (27.91 sq mi). Of this area, 38.4 km^{2} (14.8 mi^{2}) or 53.5% is used for agricultural purposes, while 19.06 km^{2} (7.36 mi^{2}) or 26.6% is forested. Of the rest of the land, 3.3 km^{2} (1.3 mi^{2}) or 4.6% is settled (buildings or roads), 0.86 km^{2} (0.33 mi^{2}) or 1.2% is either rivers or lakes and 10.16 km^{2} (3.92 mi^{2}) or 14.2% is unproductive land.

Of the built up area, housing and buildings made up 1.9% and transportation infrastructure made up 1.6%. Out of the forested land, 21.8% of the total land area is heavily forested and 3.3% is covered with orchards or small clusters of trees. Of the agricultural land, 16.9% is pastures and 36.5% is used for alpine pastures. All the water in the municipality is flowing water. Of the unproductive areas, 8.8% is unproductive vegetation and 5.3% is too rocky for vegetation.

The municipality includes parts of the Kander and Engstligen valleys between the Niesenkette and Gehrihorn. It includes the villages of Frutigen, Kanderbrück, Hasli, Innerschwandi, Ladholz, Oberfeld-Prasten, Reinisch and Winklen mit Weilern as well as individual farms on the valley floor and stretching up the mountain sides to 1,600 m (5,200 ft) above sea level.

On 31 December 2009 Amtsbezirk Frutigen, the municipality's former district, was dissolved. On the following day, 1 January 2010, it joined the newly created Verwaltungskreis Frutigen-Niedersimmental.

== Coat of arms ==
The blazon of the municipal coat of arms is Argent an Eagle displayed Sable crowned, beaked, langued and membered Or.

== Demographics ==
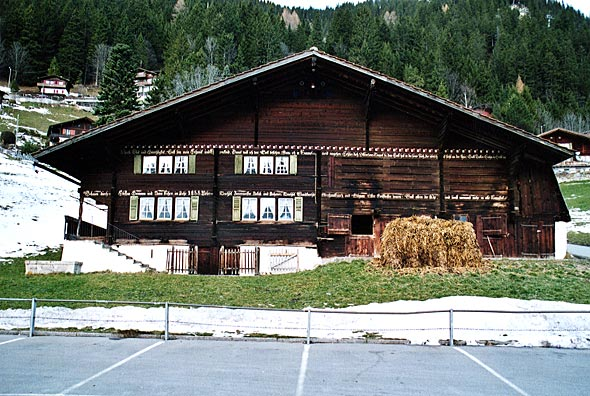
A traditional Adelboden valley farm house in Frutigen

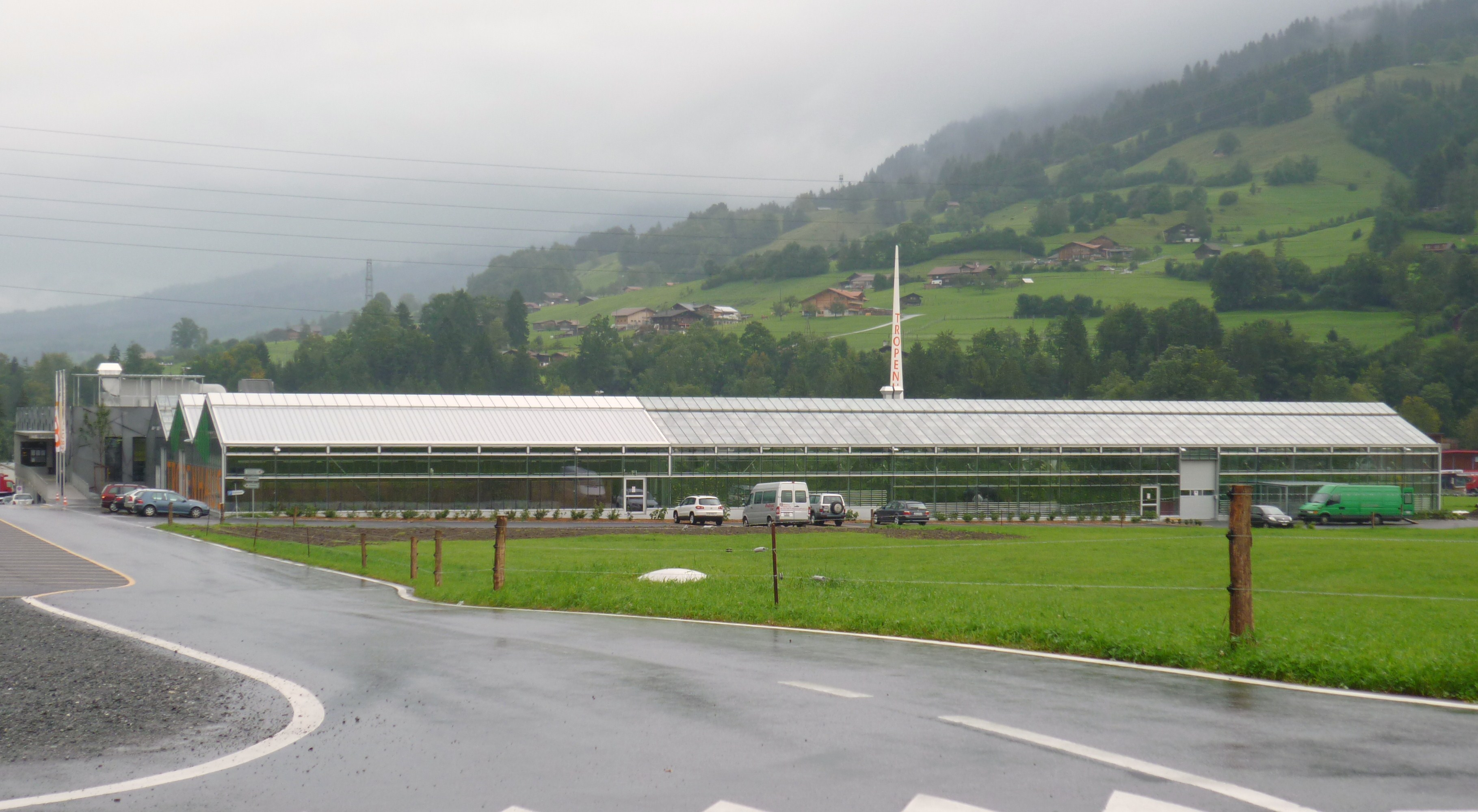
Tropical greenhouse in Frutigen, the Tropenhaus Frutigen, which is geothermally heated

Frutigen has a population (as of December 2020) of 6,967. As of 2010, 6.2% of the population are resident foreign nationals. Over the last 10 years (2000–2010) the population has changed at a rate of 0%. Migration accounted for 0.5%, while births and deaths accounted for 1.1%.

Most of the population (as of 2000) speaks German (6,403 or 96.1%) as their first language, Albanian is the second most common (63 or 0.9%) and French is the third (35 or 0.5%). There are 23 people who speak Italian and 2 people who speak Romansh.

As of 2008, the population was 48.0% male and 52.0% female. The population was made up of 3,010 Swiss men (44.8% of the population) and 214 (3.2%) non-Swiss men. There were 3,294 Swiss women (49.0%) and 200 (3.0%) non-Swiss women. Of the population in the municipality, 3,826 or about 57.4% were born in Frutigen and lived there in 2000. There were 1,620 or 24.3% who were born in the same canton, while 532 or 8.0% were born somewhere else in Switzerland, and 454 or 6.8% were born outside of Switzerland.

As of 2010, children and teenagers (0–19 years old) make up 23.8% of the population, while adults (20–64 years old) make up 59.2% and seniors (over 64 years old) make up 17%.

As of 2000, there were 2,959 people who were single and never married in the municipality. There were 3,088 married individuals, 436 widows or widowers and 178 individuals who are divorced.

As of 2000, there were 756 households that consist of only one person and 320 households with five or more people. In 2000, a total of 2,432 apartments (79.8% of the total) were permanently occupied, while 474 apartments (15.6%) were seasonally occupied and 140 apartments (4.6%) were empty. As of 2010, the construction rate of new housing units was 2.1 new units per 1000 residents. The vacancy rate for the municipality, in 2011, was 0.43%.

The historical population is given in the following chart:

== Sights ==
The entire hamlet of Kanderbrück and the Rybrügg / Hasli area are part of the Inventory of Swiss Heritage Sites.

== Politics ==
In the 2011 federal election the most popular party was the Swiss People's Party (SVP) which received 39.7% of the vote. The next three most popular parties were the Evangelical People's Party (EVP) (11.7%), the Christian Social Party (CSP) (11.7%) and the Federal Democratic Union of Switzerland (EDU) (11.5%). In the federal election, a total of 3,014 votes were cast, and the voter turnout was 58.7%.

== Economy ==
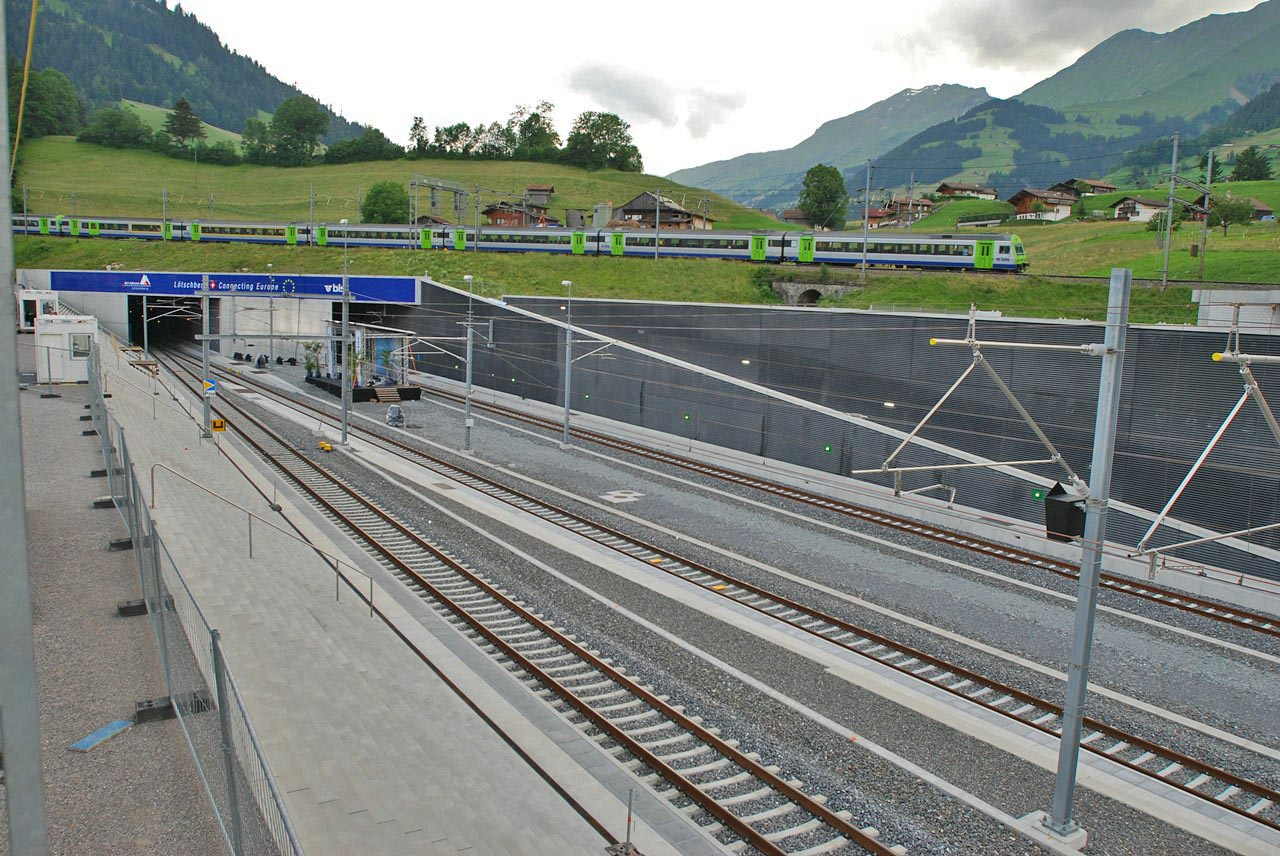
The north portal in Frutigen

Today the main focus of its economy is the hydraulics industry, slate mining and tourism.

Frutigen is at the northern point of the Lötschberg Base Tunnel, whose geothermal energy powers the Tropenhaus Frutigen, a tropical greenhouse producing exotic fruit, sturgeon meat and caviar.

As of 2011, Frutigen had an unemployment rate of 0.99%. As of 2008, there were a total of 3,628 people employed in the municipality. Of these, there were 648 people employed in the primary economic sector and about 225 businesses involved in this sector. 1,324 people were employed in the secondary sector and there were 97 businesses in this sector. 1,656 people were employed in the tertiary sector, with 184 businesses in this sector. There were 3,277 residents of the municipality who were employed in some capacity, of which females made up 39.9% of the workforce.

In 2008 there were a total of 2,831 full-time equivalent jobs. The number of jobs in the primary sector was 361, of which 357 were in agriculture, 1 was in forestry or lumber production and 3 were in fishing or fisheries. The number of jobs in the secondary sector was 1,216 of which 885 or (72.8%) were in manufacturing and 329 (27.1%) were in construction. The number of jobs in the tertiary sector was 1,254. In the tertiary sector; 280 or 22.3% were in wholesale or retail sales or the repair of motor vehicles, 206 or 16.4% were in the movement and storage of goods, 92 or 7.3% were in a hotel or restaurant, 18 or 1.4% were in the information industry, 74 or 5.9% were the insurance or financial industry, 96 or 7.7% were technical professionals or scientists, 90 or 7.2% were in education and 280 or 22.3% were in health care.

In 2000, there were 888 workers who commuted into the municipality and 1,124 workers who commuted away. The municipality is a net exporter of workers, with about 1.3 workers leaving the municipality for every one entering. Of the working population, 12.4% used public transportation to get to work, and 47.7% used a private car.

== Transport ==
Frutigen railway station, on the Lötschberg line, is adjacent to the village of Frutigen. It is served by trains to Bern, Thun and Brig. The municipality is also served by PostAuto bus services from the railway station to Wengi, Reudlen and Reichenbach im Kandertal, to Kandergrund, Blausee, Mitholz and Kandersteg, and to Achseten and Adelboden.

== Religion ==
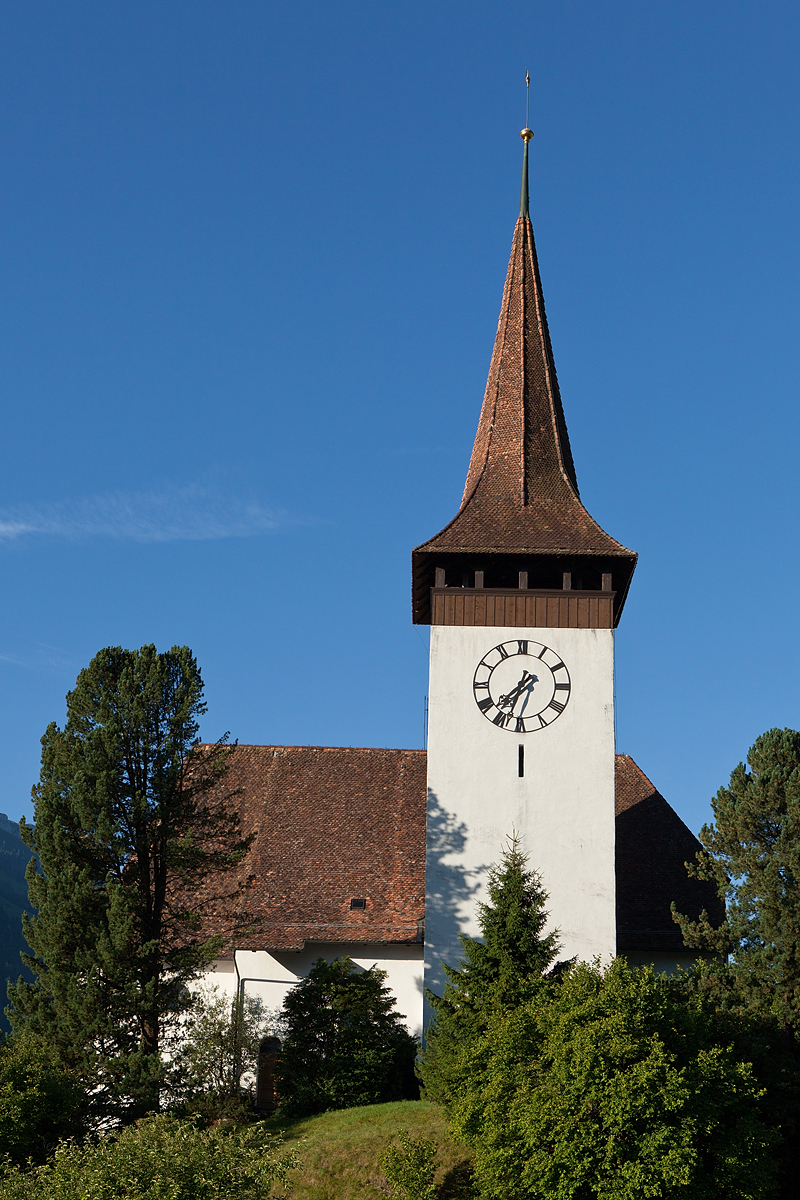
Frutigen village Reformed church

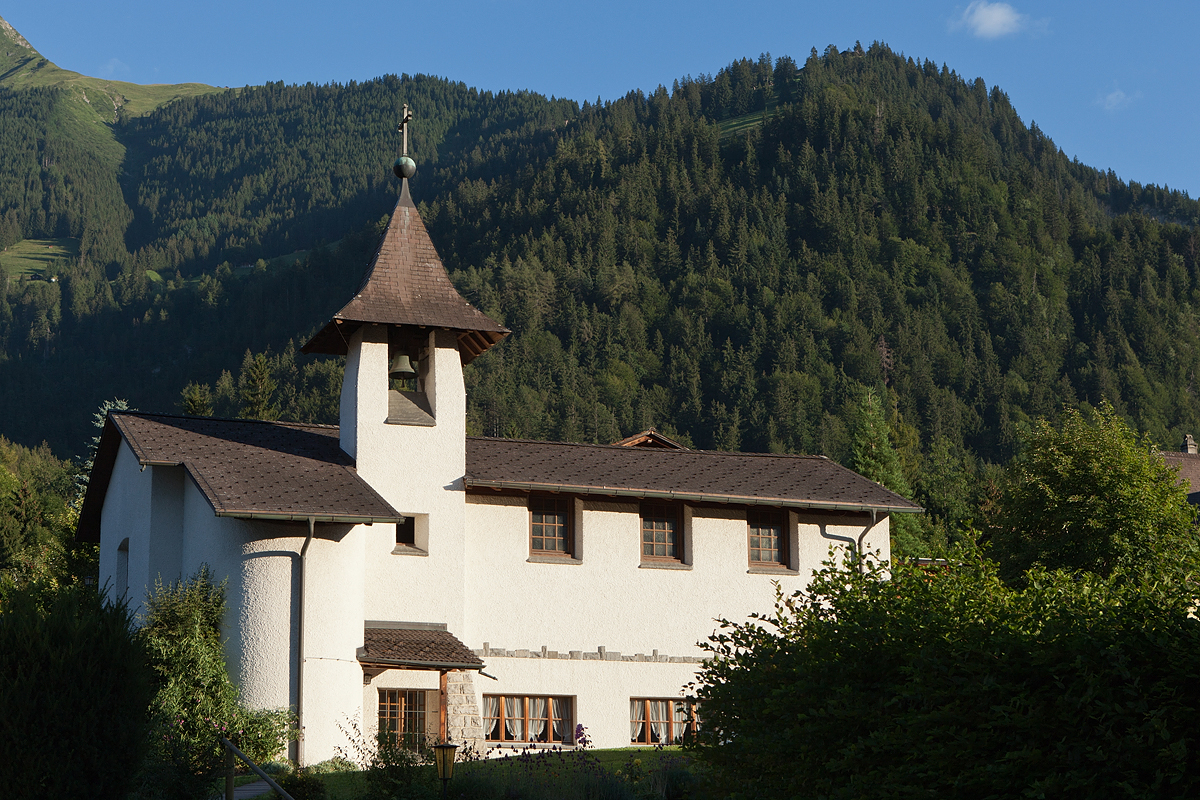
Frutigen Catholic church

From the 2000 census, 397 or 6.0% were Roman Catholic, while 4,586 or 68.8% belonged to the Swiss Reformed Church. Of the rest of the population, there were 33 members of an Orthodox church (or about 0.50% of the population), there was 1 individual who belongs to the Christian Catholic Church, and there were 1,886 individuals (or about 28.31% of the population) who belonged to another Christian church. There were 3 individuals (or about 0.05% of the population) who were Jewish, and 135 (or about 2.03% of the population) who were Islamic. There were 5 individuals who were Buddhist, 29 individuals who were Hindu and 13 individuals who belonged to another church. 231 (or about 3.47% of the population) belonged to no church, are agnostic or atheist, and 285 individuals (or about 4.28% of the population) did not answer the question.

== Climate ==
Between 1981 and 2010 Frutigen had an average of 136.8 days of rain or snow per year and on average received 1,237 mm (48.7 in) of precipitation. The wettest month was July during which time Frutigen received an average of 148 mm (5.8 in) of rain or snow. During this month there was precipitation for an average of 13 days. The month with the most days of precipitation was June, with an average of 14.1, but with only 138 mm (5.4 in) of rain or snow. The driest month of the year was February with an average of 79 mm (3.1 in) of precipitation over 9.4 days.

== Education ==
In Frutigen about 2,425 or (36.4%) of the population have completed non-mandatory upper secondary education, and 447 or (6.7%) have completed additional higher education (either university or a Fachhochschule). Of the 447 who completed tertiary schooling, 72.9% were Swiss men, 18.8% were Swiss women, 5.4% were non-Swiss men and 2.9% were non-Swiss women.

The Canton of Bern school system provides one year of non-obligatory Kindergarten, followed by six years of Primary school. This is followed by three years of obligatory lower Secondary school where the students are separated according to ability and aptitude. Following the lower Secondary students may attend additional schooling or they may enter an apprenticeship.

During the 2010-11 school year, there were a total of 873 students attending classes in Frutigen. There were 8 kindergarten classes with a total of 116 students in the municipality. Of the kindergarten students, 10.3% were permanent or temporary residents of Switzerland (not citizens) and 9.5% have a different mother language than the classroom language. The municipality had 22 primary classes and 445 students. Of the primary students, 8.1% were permanent or temporary residents of Switzerland (not citizens) and 2.9% have a different mother language than the classroom language. During the same year, there were 19 lower secondary classes with a total of 288 students. There were 3.8% who were permanent or temporary residents of Switzerland (not citizens) and 2.1% have a different mother language than the classroom language.

As of 2000, there were 71 students in Frutigen who came from another municipality, while 124 residents attended schools outside the municipality.

Frutigen is home to the Gemeindebibliothek Frutigen (municipal library of Frutigen). The library has (as of 2008) 6,983 books or other media, and loaned out 23,631 items in the same year. It was open a total of 253 days with average of 12 hours per week during that year.

== Cuisine ==
Blue cake is a local pastry specialty.
