= Lötschberg Base Tunnel =

Railway tunnel through the Bernese Alps

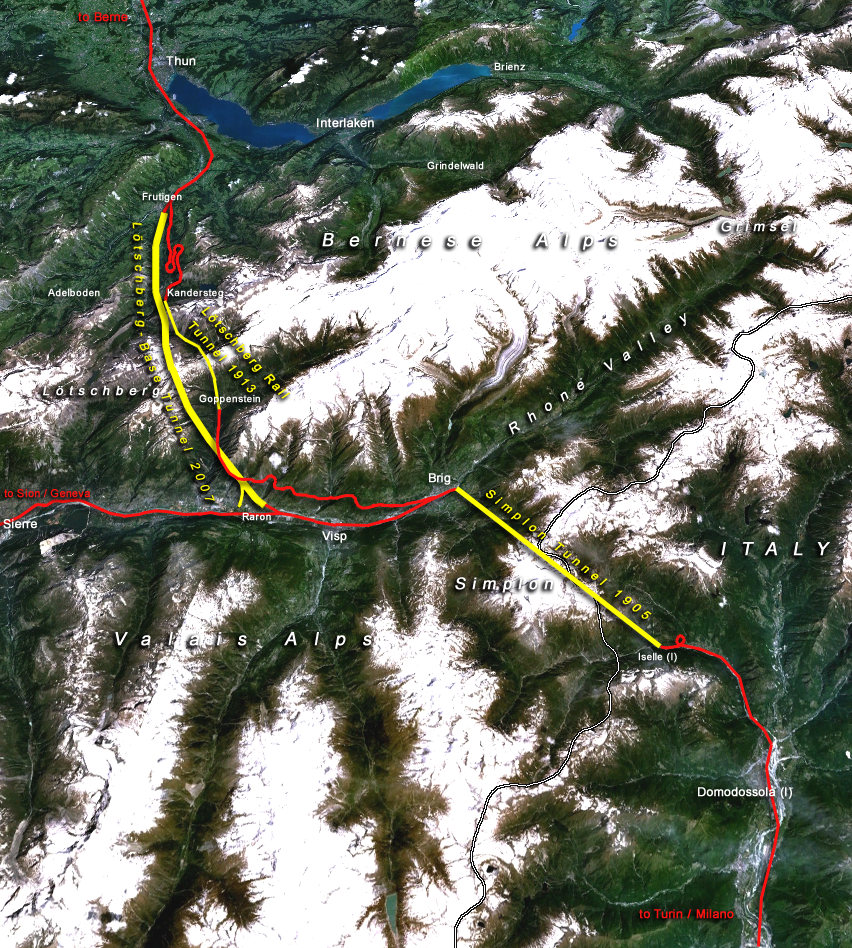
- The Lötschberg Base Tunnel together with the century-old Simplon Rail Tunnel form the western part of the NRLA project (yellow: major tunnels, red: existing main tracks, numbers: year of completion)

Overview
- Official name: German: Lötschberg Basis Tunnel
- Line: Lötschberg Line
- Location: Traversing the Bernese Alps in Switzerland
- Coordinates: 46.578°N 7.649°E – 46.309°N 7.832°E
- System: BLS, SBB CFF FFS
- Start: Frutigen, canton of Bern, 780 m (2,560 ft)
- End: Raron, canton of Valais, 654 m (2,146 ft)

Operation
- Work began: 5 July 1999
- Opened: 14 June 2007
- Owner: BLS NETZ AG
- Operator: BLS
- Traffic: Railway
- Character: Passenger, Freight

Technical
- Length: 34.5766 km (21.4849 mi)
- No. of tracks: One single-track tube for 20km, two single-track tubes for 14km
- Track gauge: 1,435 mm (4 ft 8 1/2 in) (standard gauge)
- Electrified: 15 kV 16.7 Hz
- Operating speed: Passenger (service): 200 km/h (125 mph); Maximum (technical): 250 km/h (155 mph)
- Max elevation: 828 m (2,717 ft)
- Min elevation: 654 m (2,146 ft) (south portal)
- Grade: 3–13‰

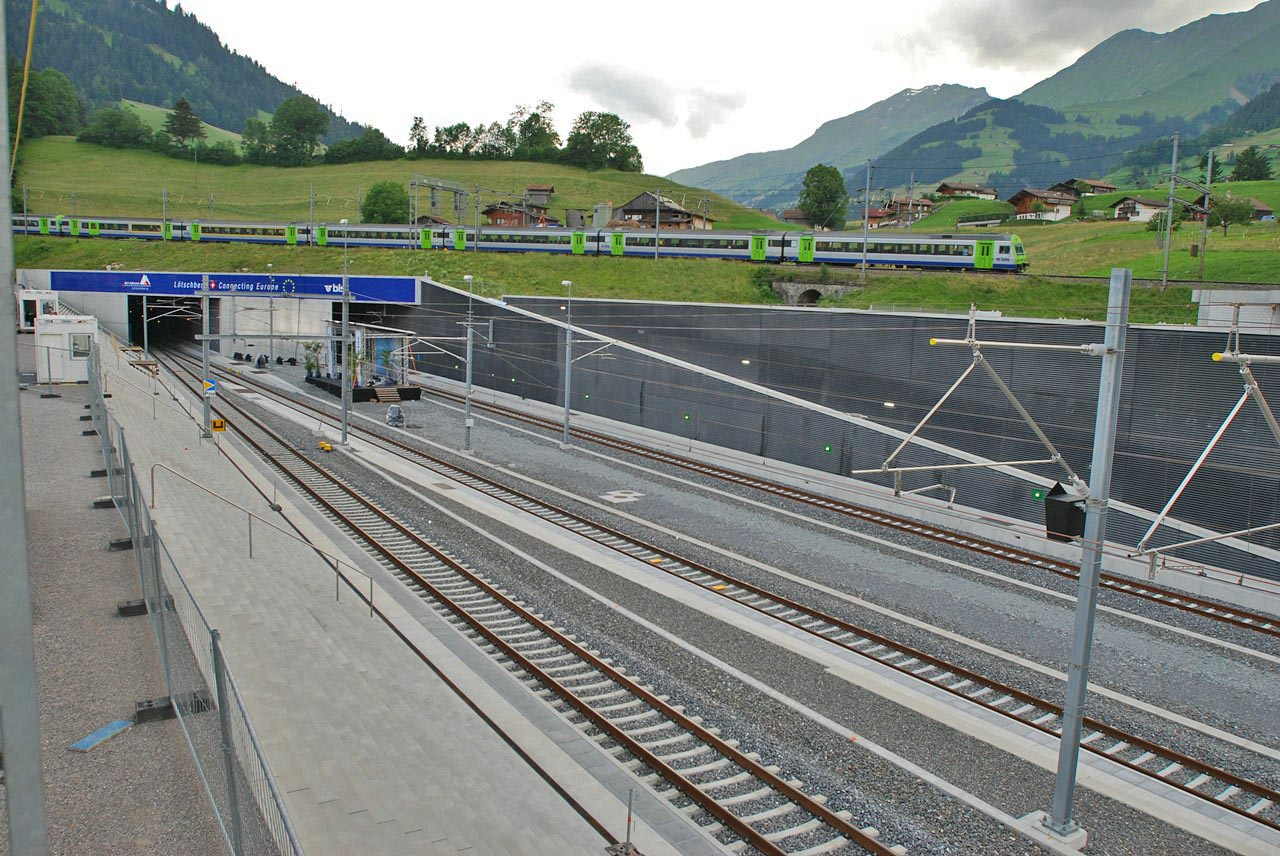
The north portal in Frutigen

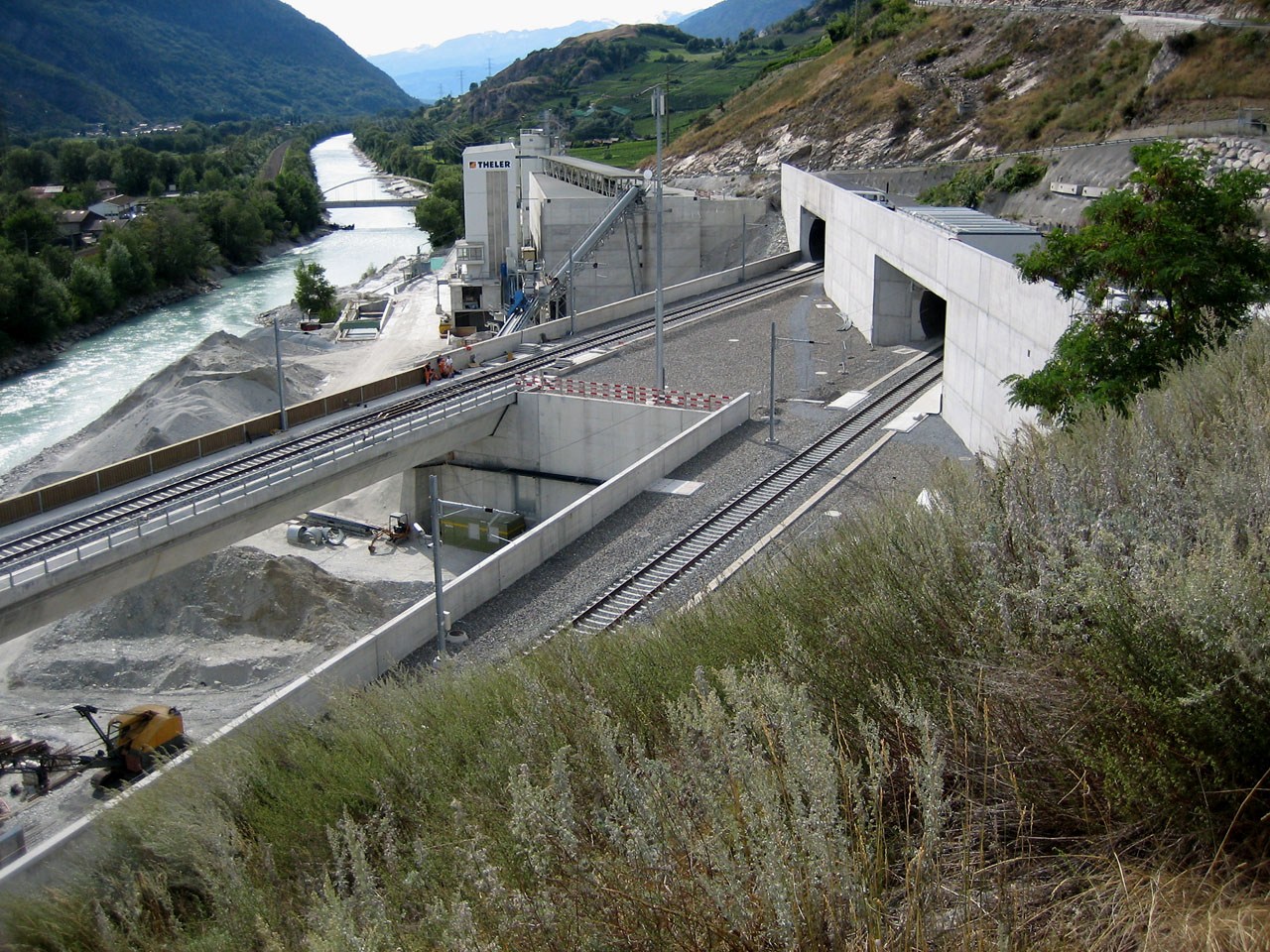
South portal near Raron

The Lötschberg Base Tunnel (LBT) is a 34.57 km (21.48 mi) railway base tunnel on the BLS AG's Lötschberg line cutting through the Bernese Alps of Switzerland some 400 m (1,300 ft) below the older Lötschberg Tunnel. It runs between Frutigen, Bern, and Raron, Valais.

The Lötschberg Base Tunnel was built as one of two centrepieces of the New Railway Link through the Alps. Construction of the LBT began in 1999 and achieved breakthrough during 2005. It was completed in June 2007 and the first train operations began in December 2007. This initial project was estimated to cost SFr4.3 billion ($3.59 billion).

The LBT was saturated within a few years of opening due to a 21 km (13 mi) single-track section. Without a second bore, its overall capacity is greatly reduced. During 2016, a planning contract was awarded for the completion of the second track of the LBT, which has been estimated to cost 1 billion Swiss francs. The resulting plan was presented in spring 2019. In early 2024, Parliament decided to complete the second bore, with an estimated cost of SFr 1.7 billion. Construction for this continuation is expected to start in 2028.

== Construction ==
=== Initial construction ===
The LBT was principally constructed to ease lorry traffic on the Swiss road network by providing faster routes for rail-based freight as an alternative. Reportedly, between the 1980s and 2000s, traffic on the north-south European axis (North Sea Ports to/from Northern Italy and along the Blue Banana) had increased more than tenfold, necessitating infrastructure investments to better cope with rising demands. Accordingly, the LBT allows a substantial number of trucks and trailers to be loaded onto trains in Germany, pass through Switzerland on rail and be unloaded in Italy (rolling highway or trailer-on-flatcar respectively). It also cuts down travel time for German tourists going to Swiss ski resorts, and puts the Valais into commuting distance to Bern by reducing travel time by 50%. The total cost was SFr 4.3 billion (as of 2007, corrected to 1998 prices). This and the Gotthard Base Tunnel are the two centerpieces of the Swiss NRLA project.

In 1994, early drilling was conducted in the area. During 1999, full-scale construction work on the LBT commenced. It was largely excavated using a combination of traditional techniques, including drilling and blasting. Roughly 80% of the tunnel was built using these conventional practices. The remaining 20% was excavated using tunnel boring machines (TBMs). The excavation work was conducted from both the north and south portals. During April 2005, the construction process reached a milestone when breakthrough was achieved; the event was attended by 1,000 guests. The excavation process reportedly used 15 thousand kilograms (16 short tons) of explosives, while the material extracted would have filled a freight train that was 4,000 kilometres (2,500 mi) in length – one-tenth of the Earth's circumference. Work over the following year centered on the fitting-out process, installing all of the operational systems, including the track itself.

In July 2006, track construction in the LBT was declared complete. Extensive testing then took place, including more than 1,000 test runs, which focused among other things on the use of the European Train Control System (ETCS) Level 2 system. Once satisfied that all systems had been validated, an official opening ceremony for the LBT was held during June 2007; at this event, the tunnel was recognised as the longest land tunnel anywhere in the world. The LBT overran its budget of roughly $2.7 billion by around $840 million, which has impacted its operation.

On 9 December 2007, the LBT was declared operational. Initially, only regular freight services traversed the LBT, along with a minority of international and InterCity passenger trains (without stops between Spiez and Brig); passenger trains continued to operate on the old timetable (the travel time between Spiez and Brig was considered to be 56 minutes until December 2007, even if actual travel time through the LBT was only about 30 minutes). Since February 2008, the LBT has been routinely used for normal InterCity routes. Travel time between Visp and Spiez is about 28 minutes, of which 16 minutes is spent inside the LBT.

=== Additional phases ===
As a consequence of spiraling costs attributable to the overall NRLA project, it was decided to redirect funds from the Lötschberg tunnel to the Gotthard Base Tunnel. This funding decision leaves the LBT in a partially-completed state for a protracted period. Once fully complete, the LBT will consist of two single track bores side by side from portal to portal, connected about every 300 m (980 ft) with cross cuts, enabling the other tunnel to be used for escape.

The construction process was divided into three phases, of which only phase one has been completed to date:

- Phase one: construction of about 75% of the length of the western tube and the complete east tube of the main tunnel, the Engstlige tunnel, the two bridges across the Rhône, and the branch bore from Steg. Tracks are laid in the eastern tubes of the LBT and Engstlige tunnels, and for some 12 km (7.5 mi) in the western tube of LBT, starting from the south.
- Phase two: laying of tracks in the bored but not equipped part of the western tube of LBT, and in the western tube of Engstlige tunnel.
- Phase three: construction of the remaining 8 km (5.0 mi) of the western tube, laying tracks on the Steg branch, and connection of this branch to the Brig-Lausanne main line towards Lausanne.

Currently, from south to north, 40% of the tunnel is therefore double track, 40% is single track with the second bore in place but not equipped, and 20% is only a single track tunnel with the parallel exploration adit providing the emergency egress. This unused western bore has been used by maintenance crews as a means of accessing the active eastern tunnel; an adjacent exploratory bore driven during the early 1990s has also proved useful for such purposes.

The cost of completing the LT was estimated to be around one billion Swiss francs in 2016. That project also includes two parallel bridges over the river Rhône in canton Valais, the 2.6 km (1.6 mi) Engstlige tunnel (built with cut-and-cover method; the two tracks are separated by a wall). A planning contract for phases two and three was awarded in 2016 to the Swiss engineering consortium IG Valbt, headed by SRP Ingenieur. The resulting plan was presented for review in early 2019, and a decision between funding only phase two or both phase two and three was initially expected in 2023. The first option would naturally have been cheaper and would have taken two years less to build, but it would have provided a much lower capacity and would have required an eight-month full closure of the line. In early 2024 the choice was made to go for the full option, with an estimated cost of CHF 1.7 billion.

In August 2026, BLS opened an information center next to Frutigen station as part of the next phase of the project, publishing adjusted construction plans for public review between August 17 and September 15, 2026. The updated timeline indicated a start of construction in 2028 and an estimate of 10 years for completion. An additional emergency stop near Mitholz is also planned.

== Operation ==
Its owner, BLS NETZ AG, presents the LBT as one of the safest, most modern and most technically complex rail tunnels in the world. The company has attributed the tunnel's congestion to the combination of the rapid growth of passenger and freight traffic with the presence of a single-track section, which severely limits its overall capacity; it views the implementation of double-track running as being "absolutely essential". Operation of the LBT allegedly has an impact on the timetable reliability and flexibility across the entire Swiss rail network, as well as facilitating a reduction in production costs via the freight traffic it carries.

The 21 kilometres (13 mi) of single track without any passing loop greatly complicates operations. Typically, trains using the LBT are scheduled together in batches that run in one direction, separated by intervals which must be longer than the last train in a batch needs to cross the single-track section; trains more than seven minutes late are either routed via the old line or must wait for the next available timetable slot in their direction in the LBT, incurring long further delays in either case. Despite its relatively recent completion date, the LBT has already become a major bottleneck for rail freight traversing the Alps. By 2019, around 110 trains per day were using the LBT, while a further 66 continued to use the old mountain tunnel largely due to the base tunnel's current capacity constraints. Of these 110, 30 were passenger services and 80 were hauling various types of freight, including both intermodal freight transport and long-distance heavy freight trains. Heavy freight trains up to a maximum weight of 3,600 tonnes (4,000 short tons) and a maximum length of 1,500 metres (4,900 ft) have to use the LBT, as they are above the maximum gauge of the existing mountain track. By 2017, the LBT reportedly facilitated the movement of 35.7 million gross tonnes (79 billion pounds) of rail freight.

The LBT is operated and monitored from a control centre based at nearby Spiez. The tunnel incorporates various measures for handling emergency situations; for use in such circumstances, a pair of intermediate access tunnels connect with the main bores at a series of underground emergency stations. Trains can also be moved between the two bores via multiple cross-over links spread throughout its length.

On 13 March 2020, the second bore of the LBT was temporarily closed to all traffic following the discovery of ingress by both water and sand while remedial work was performed to address this. In addition to cleaning the tunnel interior, removing the sand and excess water via suction, and the flushing out of its drainage system, temporary steel tanks have been installed in the bore with regular inspections of the tunnel with a particular focus on this issue. Furthermore, solutions to prevent reoccurrence in the long term have been identified and are to be compiled into a plan for approval by the Federal Office for Transport during late 2020; if approved, sections of the LBT shall be modified accordingly. On 27 April 2020, it was announced that the LBT had been fully reopened.

== Travel speeds ==
- Regular freight trains: 100 km/h (62 mph)
- Qualified freight trains: 160 km/h (100 mph)
- Passenger trains: 200 km/h (125 mph)
- Tilting passenger trains: 250 km/h (155 mph)

== Geothermal energy ==
Warm groundwater continuously drains from the LBT. The warmth of this water flowing out of the tunnel is used to heat the Tropenhaus Frutigen, a tropical greenhouse producing exotic fruit, sturgeon meat and caviar.

== See also ==
- Lötschberg
- List of longest tunnels
- List of tunnels by location
- High-speed rail in Switzerland
