= Blue cake =

Swiss cake

- Type: Pastry
- Place of origin: Switzerland
- Main ingredients: Puff pastry

Blue cake (German: Blauer Kuchen) is a flaky pastry that is a specialty of the Frutig valley (the lower part of the Kander valley consisting of the municipalities of Aeschi, Reichenbach, Frutigen and Kandergrund) in the Bernese Oberland, Switzerland. It consists only of puff pastry with no filling or other ingredients. Despite its name, it is not blue.

== History ==
Blue cake has been produced by Frutig valley bakeries since at least the 1900s. Up until the 1950s, however, it was only sold in colder months, when butter could be kept cold more easily, and around major holidays. As of 2000, the cake is available on weekends around the year in most bakeries, where it is one of the most important weekend pastries.

Despite its name, the cake is not actually blue, and some Frutig valley bakers who were interviewed by Swiss culinary historians in the 2000s provided different explanations for the name. One such explanation was that, in the local dialect, "to make blue" (blau machen) means to take a holiday. Other bakers believe that the name refers to the faint blue tint of the uncooked dough or to the blueish, buttery steam emerging from the oven in which the cake is baked.

== Production ==
Blue cake is made only by professional bakers from a dough of flour, butter, water and salt. Several layers of butter are rolled into the dough with a special rolling machine (tourage), after which the dough is cut into roundels of pastry 6 cm thick and 25 cm or more in diameter. These are cut with decorative patterns, brushed with eggs and baked at 220 °C for 20 minutes.

The mostly orally transmitted recipes differ among local bakers, who as of the 2000s are producing the cake in the third or fourth generation. The amount of butter used, the time during which the dough is allowed to rest before baking (up to two days) and the baking temperature and heat all vary.

== Consumption ==
Blue cake is eaten as a snack with cheese and meat or at breakfast with coffee, butter and jam. It has a light and buttery taste.

The cake is mostly appreciated by Frutig Valley residents and is virtually unknown among visitors and outside the valley.

== See also ==
- Culinary Heritage of Switzerland
