= Felsenburg =

Felsenburg, or Felsenburg Castle, may refer to:

- Felsenburg (Bern), a castle in the Swiss city of Bern
- Felsenburg (Kandergrund), a ruined castle in Kandergrund in the Swiss canton of Bern

== Other uses ==
- Felsenburg is the German word for a rock castle, which is a type of hill castle

== See also ==
- Palisades Island (German: Insel Felsenburg)
