= Felsenburg (Kandergrund) =

Castle ruin in Kandergrund, Switzerland

Felsenburg Castle
- Burgruine Felsenburg
- Kandergrund
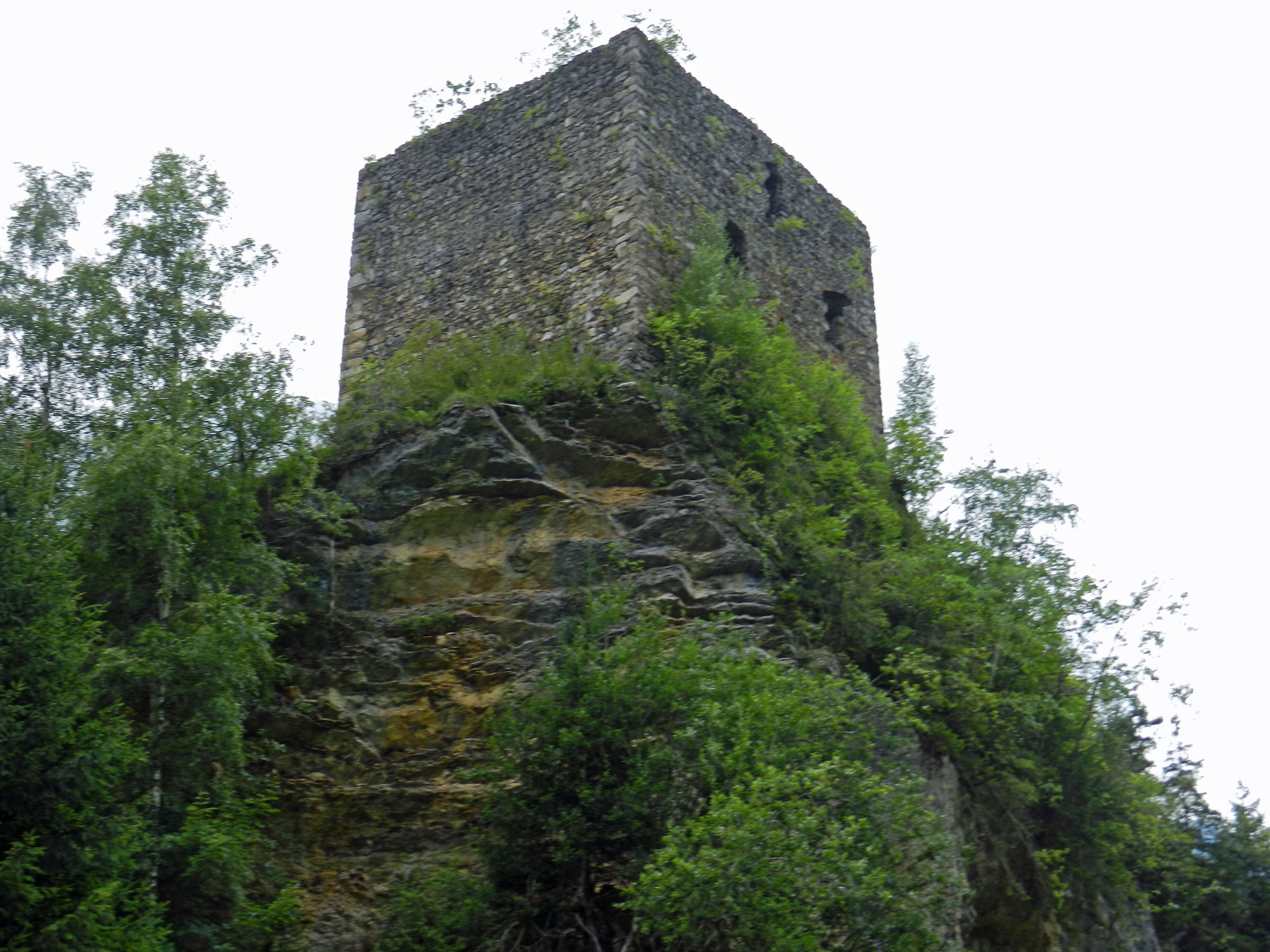
- Ruins of Felsenburg Castle

Site information
- Open to the public: yes

Location
- Coordinates: 46.531894°N 7.673257°E

Site history
- Built: 12th century
- Built by: Freiherr of Kien

Felsenburg Castle is a ruined castle in the municipality of Kandergrund of the Canton of Bern in Switzerland. It is a Swiss heritage site of national significance.

== History ==
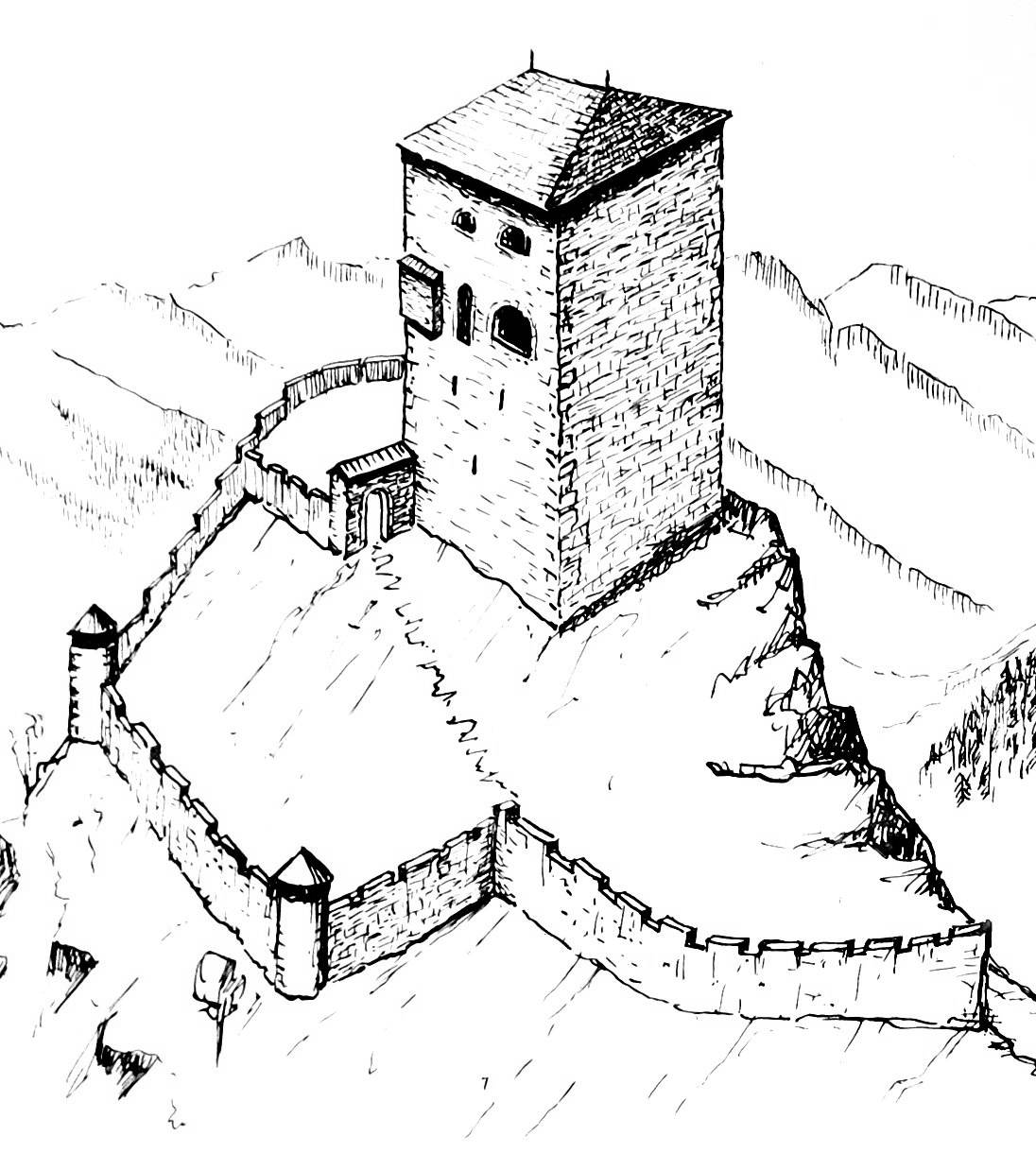
Probable appearance around 1400

Felsenburg castle was probably built in the 12th century for the Freiherr of Kien. The castle was built on a rocky spire above the road over the Gemmi pass into Valais. It was inherited, along with the rest of the Herrschaft of Frutigen, by the Freiherr of Wädenswil in 1290. The Freiherr of Turn acquired it from Wädenswil in 1312. It was mentioned in a record in 1339 as the castrum de Petra. It was again mentioned in 1368 as Stein, German for Stone. In 1400, Bern acquired the castle along with the rest of the Herrschaft. They abandoned Felsenburg and allowed it fall into ruin.

== Castle site ==
Currently, only the rectangular main tower and remnants of the outer walls are still standing.

== See also ==
- List of castles in Switzerland
