= Tellenburg Castle =

Castle in Frutigen in Bern, Switzerland

- Tellenburg
- Frutigen
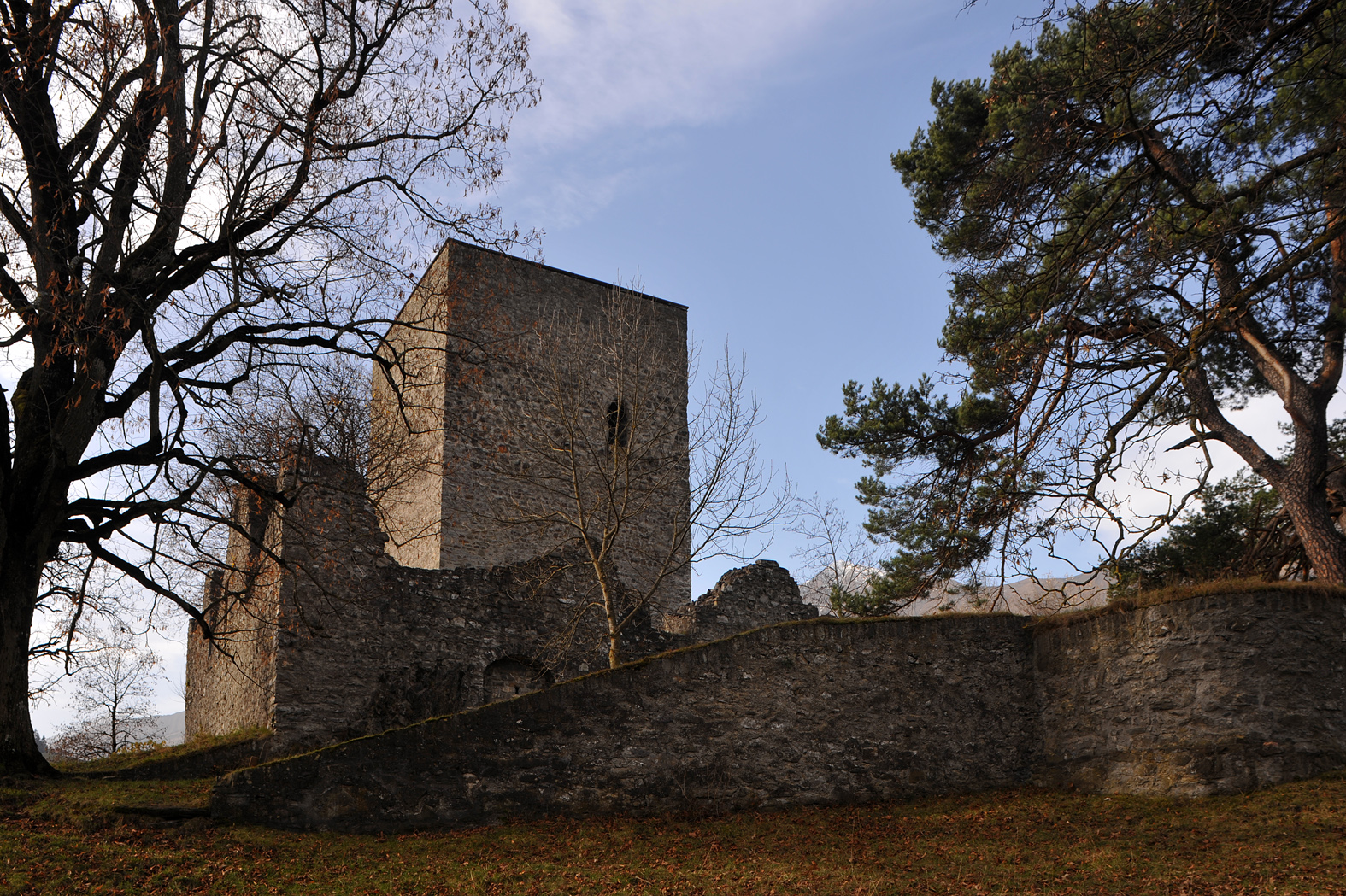
- Tellenburg Castle

Site information
- Type: Castle
- Owner: Canton of Bern
- Open to the public: yes
- Condition: ruined

Location
- Coordinates: 46.575884°N 7.652103°E

Site history
- Built: 1200
- Built by: Lords of Kien
- Materials: stone

Tellenburg Castle is a ruined castle in the municipality of Frutigen in the canton of Bern in Switzerland.

== History ==
The castle was built around 1200 by the Lords of Kien. After the Lords of Kien, the Lords of Wädenswil became the owners of the castle. They were followed by the Lords of Turn in 1312 and then later by the city of Bern. The original castle was expanded and repaired in the 13th or 14th centuries.

Under Bernese rule, the castle served as the administrative seat of the surrounding area until the creation of the Helvetic Republic in 1798. After 1798 it was used as a poor house. In 1885, the castle was gutted in a fire. It was never rebuilt and has slowly fallen into ruin.

== Origin of the name ==
Tellenburg Castle was built as an administrative center and toll station. Telle at beginning of the name likely comes from the German word for toll, Zoll, while burg simply means fortress.

== See also ==
- List of castles in Switzerland
