= Gehrihorn =

Mountain in Switzerland

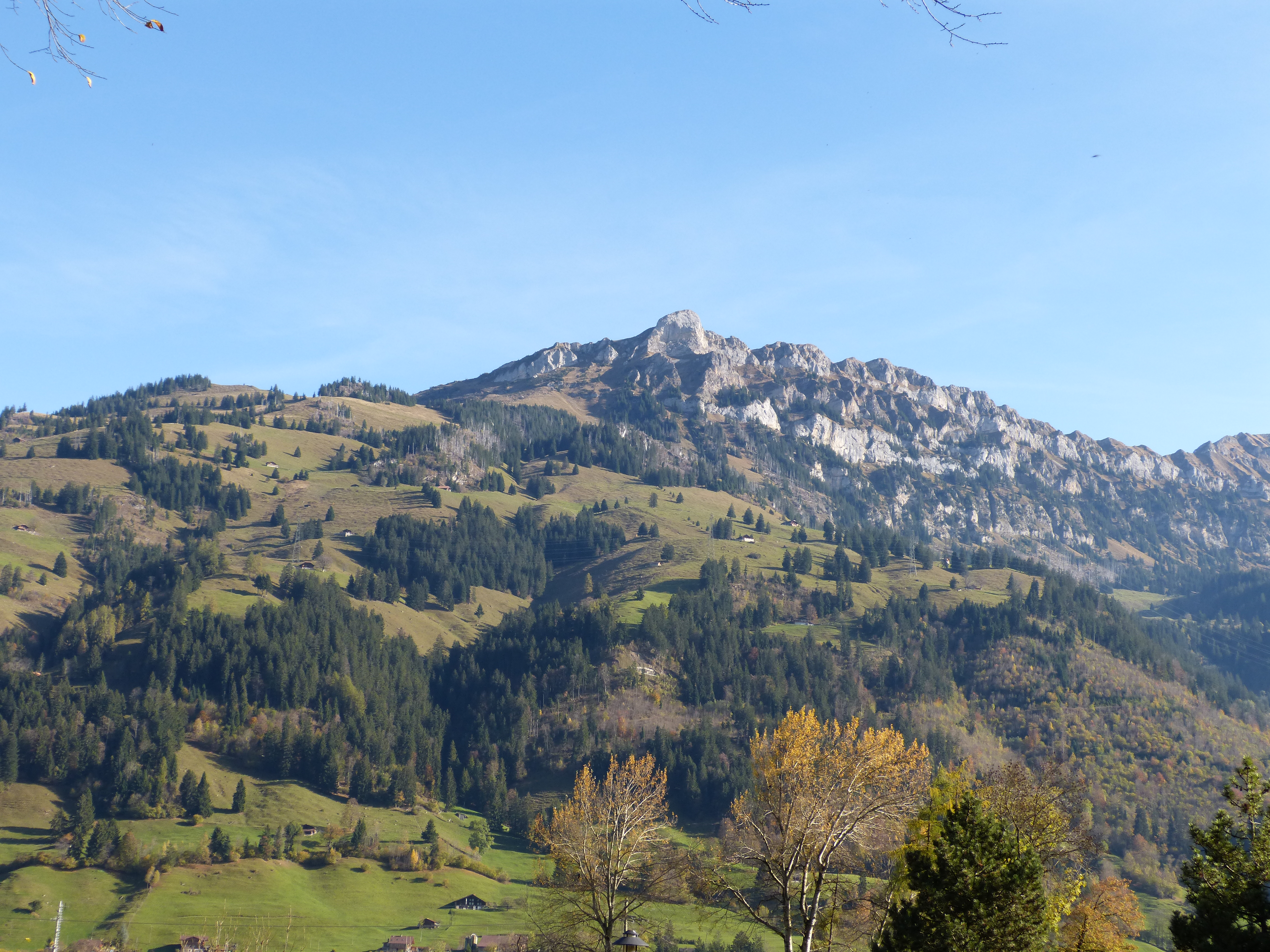
- Gehrihorn viewed from the village of Frutigen

Highest point
- Elevation: 2,130 m (6,990 ft)
- Prominence: 40 m (130 ft)
- Parent peak: Rüederigsgrat (2,142 m)
- Coordinates: 46°34′25.7″N 7°41′32″E

Geography
- Location within Switzerland
- Location: Bern, Switzerland
- Parent range: Bernese Alps

The Gehrihorn is a mountain of the Bernese Alps, overlooking Frutigen in the Bernese Oberland. It lies at the northern end of the range between the Kandertal and the Kiental.
