= Tropenhaus Frutigen =

Geothermal greenhouse in Switzerland

Coordinates: 46°35′36″N 7°39′22″E

Tropenhaus Frutigen AG
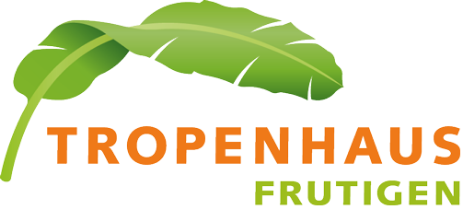
- Type: Private
- Industry: Tropical fruit, sturgeon meat, caviar, tourism
- Founded: 2003
- Headquarters: Frutigen, Switzerland
- Area served: Canton of Bern
- Key people: Marcel Baillods (CEO)
- Website: www.tropenhaus-frutigen.ch

The Tropenhaus (English: Tropic House) in Frutigen, Switzerland, is a commercial project using geothermal energy from hot water flowing out of the Lötschberg base tunnel for the production of sturgeon meat, and caviar and formerly exotic fruit in a tropical greenhouse in the Swiss Alps. In 2007, the project received the Prix Evenir, the Swiss petroleum industry's CHF 50,000 award for sustainable development.

The idea for the greenhouse began in 2002 when it became apparent that the water continuously flowing out of the Lötschberg Base Tunnel could not be directly diverted to the local river, the Kander, as its temperature of 20 °C (68 °F) would disrupt the biological rhythm of the endangered trout there. Rather than cooling the water artificially, wasting its thermal energy, tunnel engineers founded a start-up company to use the warm water to heat a greenhouse. The construction of the site began in May 2008 at 8 million CHF, and was completed by the end of 2009. Visitors were welcomed that same year.

Layout

A sturgeon farm, one of few in Europe, is the heart of the Tropenhaus. Some 60,000 fish are intended to be grown in 40 outdoor basins. The sturgeons thrive in permanent Siberian summer conditions and are intended to yield 20 tonnes of meat as well as two tonnes of caviar annually. The first sturgeon fillets were sold in local stores in November 2008. The rest of the greenhouses were initially dedicated to the production of tropical fruits, such as banana, papaya, mango and guava in an area of 2,000 m^{2} (21,500 sq ft).

The Tropenhaus was also conceived as a tourist destination, with a visitors' centre, a visitors' trail through the installation, a restaurant, and an exhibition room (paid for by a Bernese energy company) showcasing the project's use of renewable energy and sustainability.

In 2024, the Tropenhaus ended all touristical activities to focus on fish and caviar production.

== See also ==
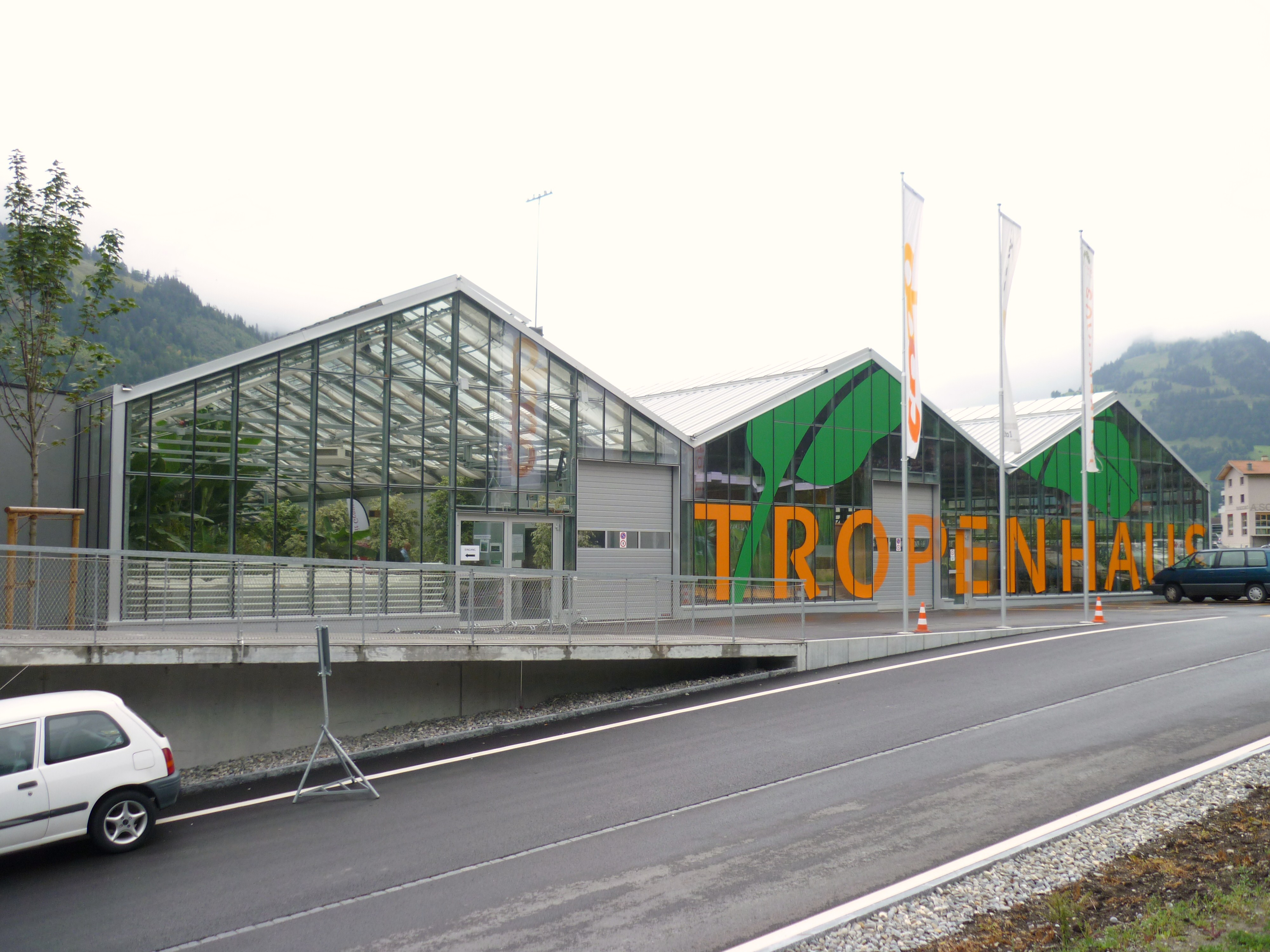
Exterior of the Tropenhaus

- Fishing industry in Switzerland
