= Blausee =

Lake in Bernese Oberland, Kandergrund, Switzerland

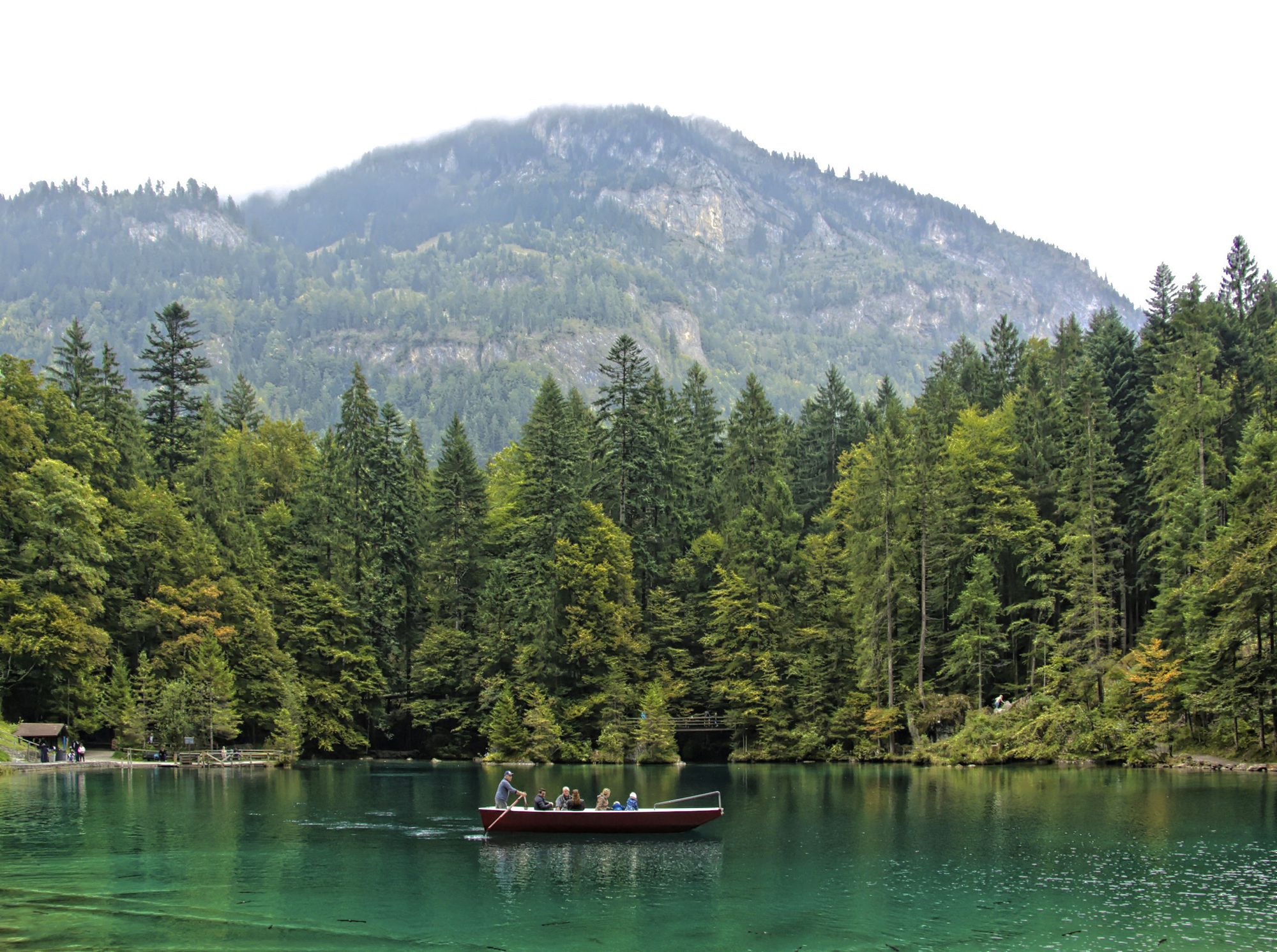

- Location within Canton of Bern Location within Switzerland Location within Alps
- Interactive map of Blausee
- Location: Bernese Oberland, Switzerland
- Coordinates: 46°31′57″N 7°39′53″E
- Basin countries: Switzerland
- Surface area: 0.64 ha (1.6 acres)
- Max. depth: 10 m (33 ft)
- Surface elevation: 887 m (2,910 ft)

Blausee (German pronunciation: [ˈblaʊˌzeː], lit. 'Blue Lake') is a lake in Bernese Oberland, Kandergrund, Switzerland. It is located near the Kander river. The lake has an elevation of 887 metres (2,910 ft) and an area of 0.64 hectares (1.6 acres).

== Gallery ==
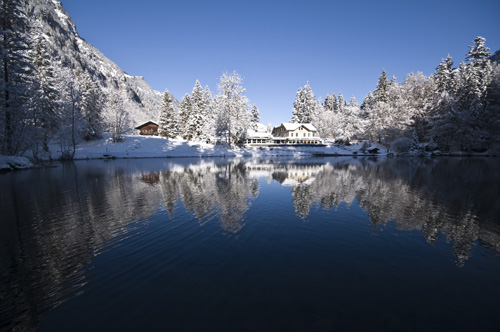

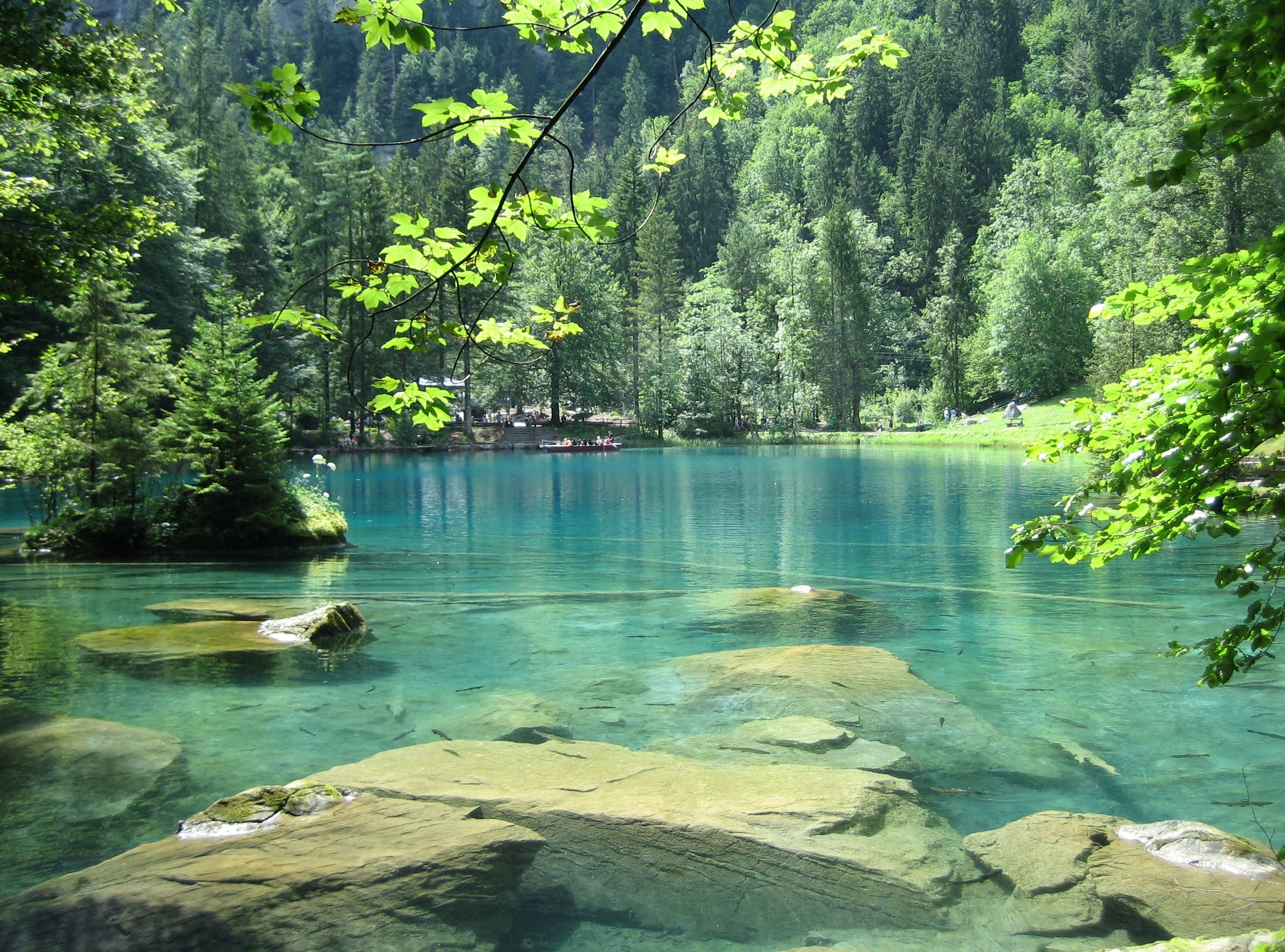

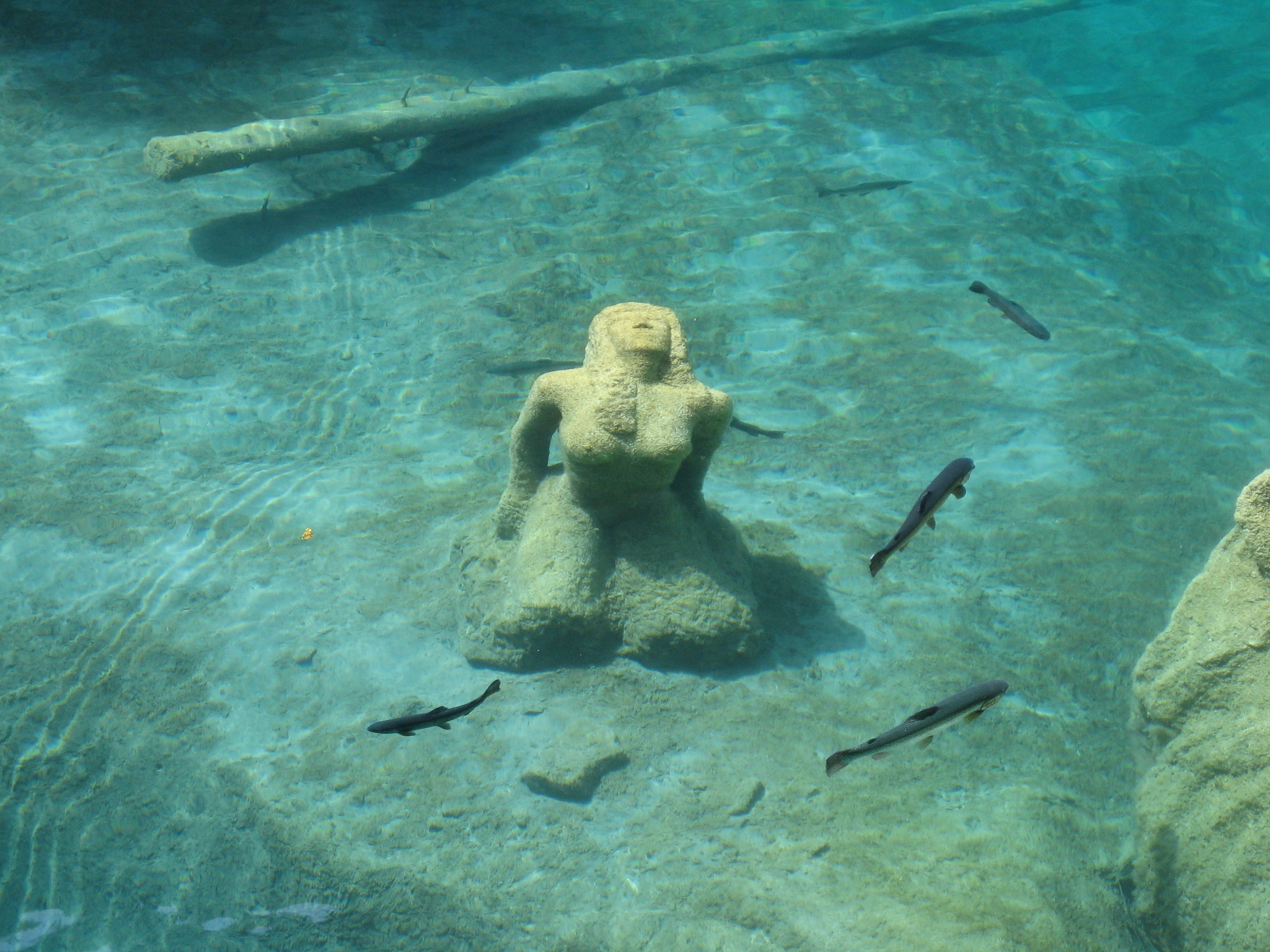
