= Mitholz =

Village in Kandergrund municipality

Coordinates: 46.5273°N 7.6746°E

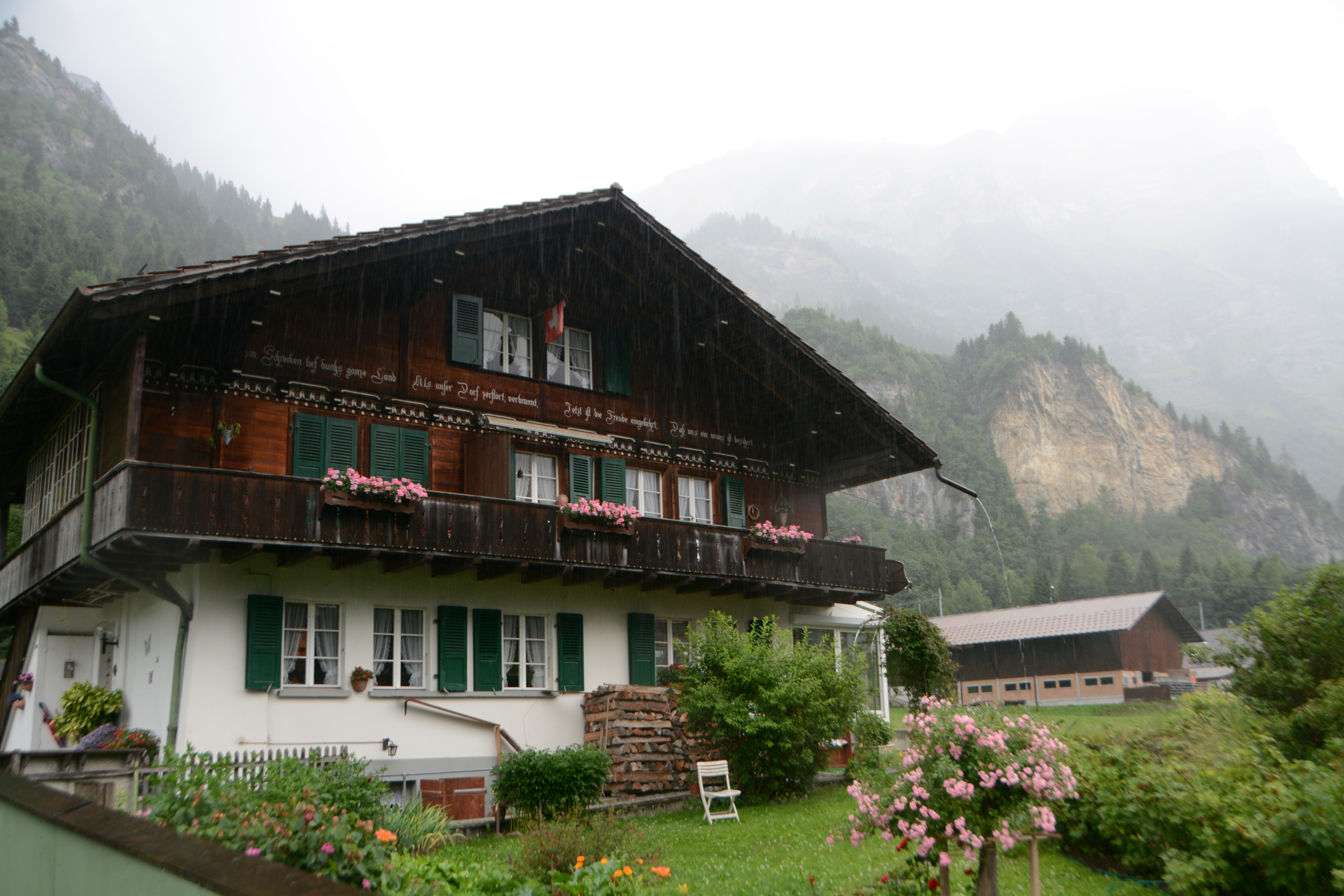
House in Mitholz with inscription referring to the 1947 explosion and fire

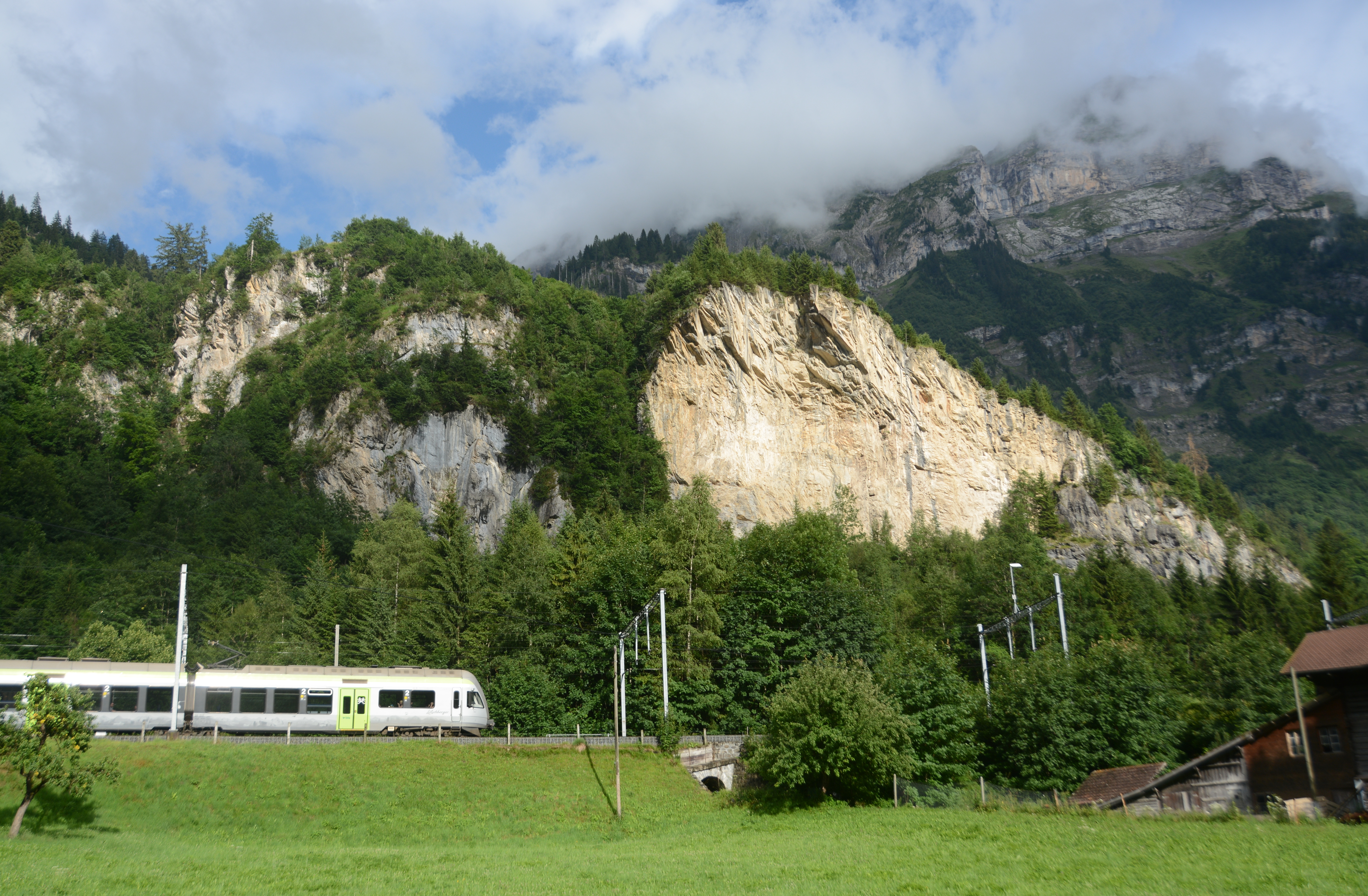
Scar left on the mountain by 1947 explosion

Mitholz or Blausee-Mitholz is a village in Kandergrund municipality in the canton of Bern in Switzerland, with 170 inhabitants as of 2020. Blausee-Mitholz is a station on the Lötschberg railway line. A munitions storage explosion in 1947 destroyed the village and killed nine people. A safety study commissioned in 2018 found that the site still contained munitions and was unsafe, and in 2020 the government announced that the village must be temporarily abandoned in 2030 for a clean-up that is projected to last 10 years.

== History ==
Mitholz was one of six populated places in the Kander Valley to make up the municipality of Kandergrund at its formation in 1850. After the development of the Lötschberg railway, the municipality was split in 1908 with effect in 1909; Kandersteg became a separate, larger municipality, and Mitholz is now one of three centres of population in Kandergrund. It had the first school in the valley, opened in 1740, and had a post office until 1998.

The steep topography of the Kander Valley has caused a series of natural disasters to affect the village. In August 1945, a landslide and ensuing flooding killed two people; in winter 1998–99, an avalanche caused damage; in 1987 and 2011, the village was flooded. The village was also one of the worst affected settlements in the region in Cyclone Lothar in December 1999.

=== 1947 munitions explosion ===
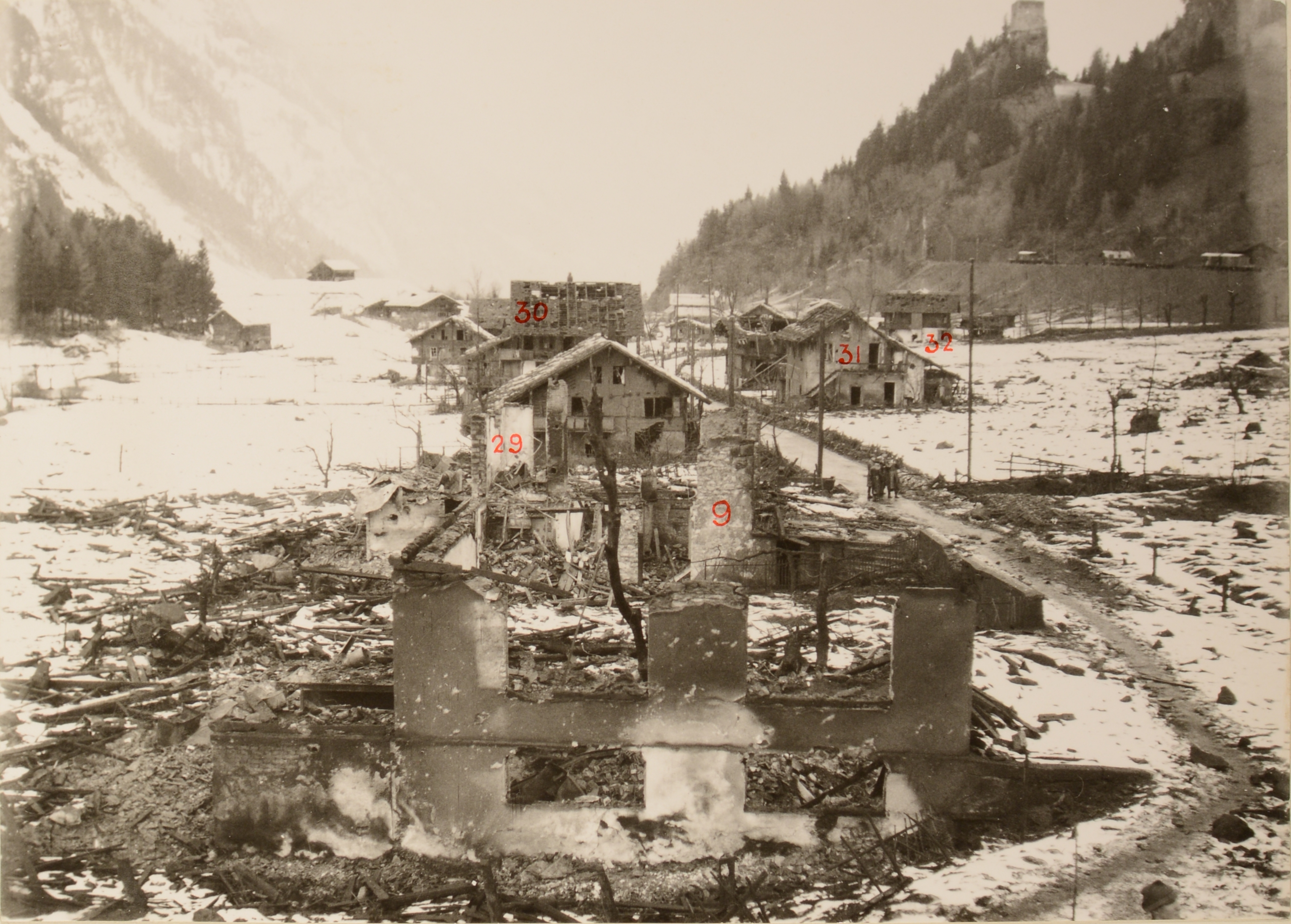
Destruction in December 1947: houses, post office and village shop

More than 7,000 tonnes of munitions, including aerial bombs, artillery rounds, land mines and hand grenades, were stored by the Swiss Armed Forces in a depot inside a mountain overlooking Mitholz. The depot, one of the largest in a system of underground weapons stores built during World War II as an expansion of the National Redoubt, consisted of 6 chambers 150 metres (490 ft) in length. Shortly before midnight on 19 December 1947, an explosion of unknown cause blew off part of the side of the mountain, one of the largest non-nuclear explosions up to that date. Forty buildings in the village, including the station and the school, were destroyed by flying rocks and fire from exploding ordnance; nine people were killed, four of them children, and 20 injured. Approximately 20 houses were rebuilt in traditional style by craftsmen from the neighbouring Frutig Valley; many have inscriptions commemorating the disaster. The munitions storage was partly rebuilt and was later used to store pharmaceuticals; in 2010 it was proposed as the site of a data centre.

In 2018, the Federal Department of Defence, Civil Protection and Sport announced that approximately half the munitions had not exploded, but remained inside the collapsed depot and under unstable rock, and a commissioned safety study found that there was a risk of another explosion. In February 2020, a further announcement was made that the village must be evacuated by 2030 in order for the Armed Forces to either remove or safely bury the remaining munitions, which is estimated to require ten years. Residents are to be compensated and offered housing to which to relocate.

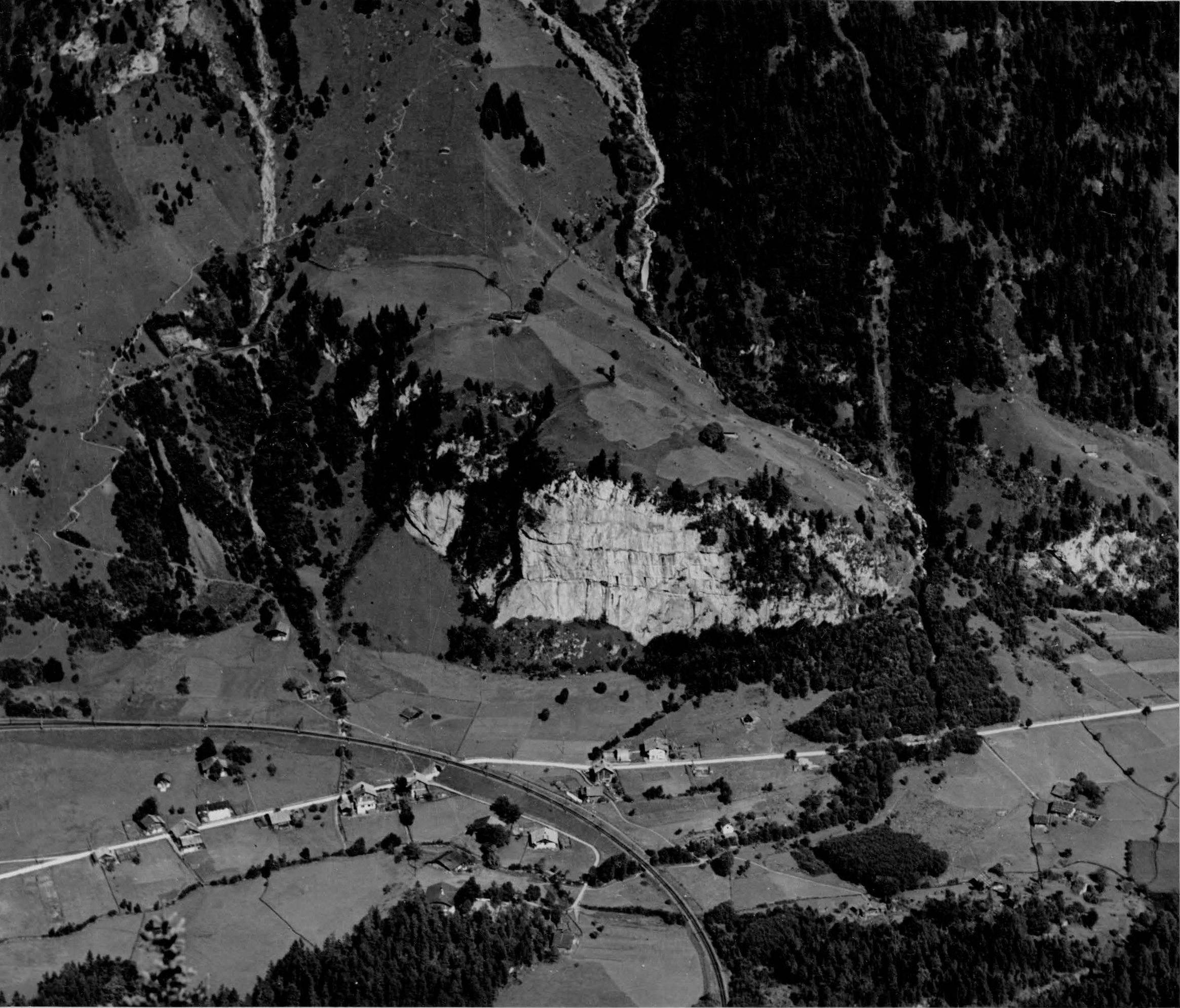
Aerial photograph of Mitholz, c. 1930, before construction of the munitions facility

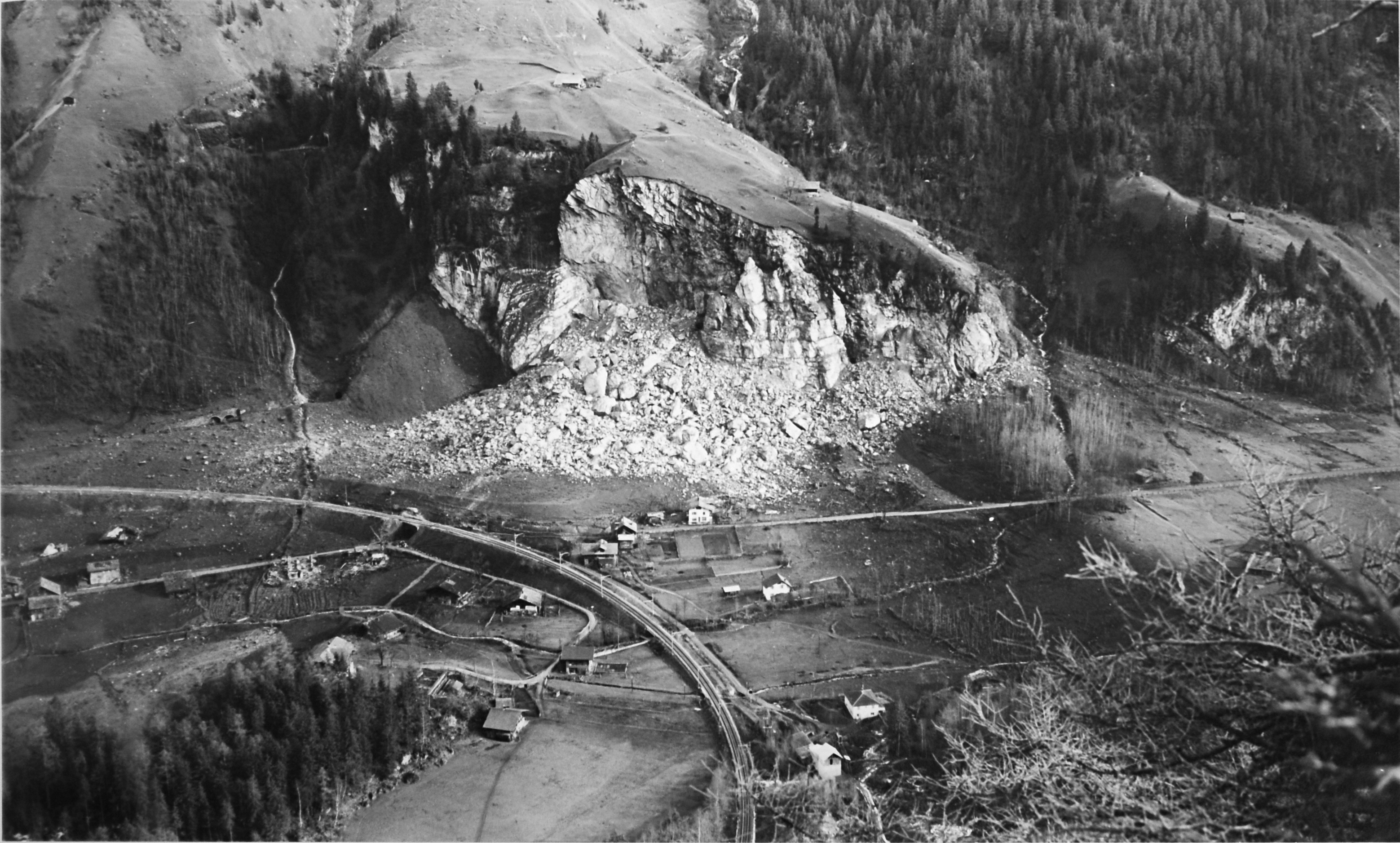
Elevated photograph January 1948

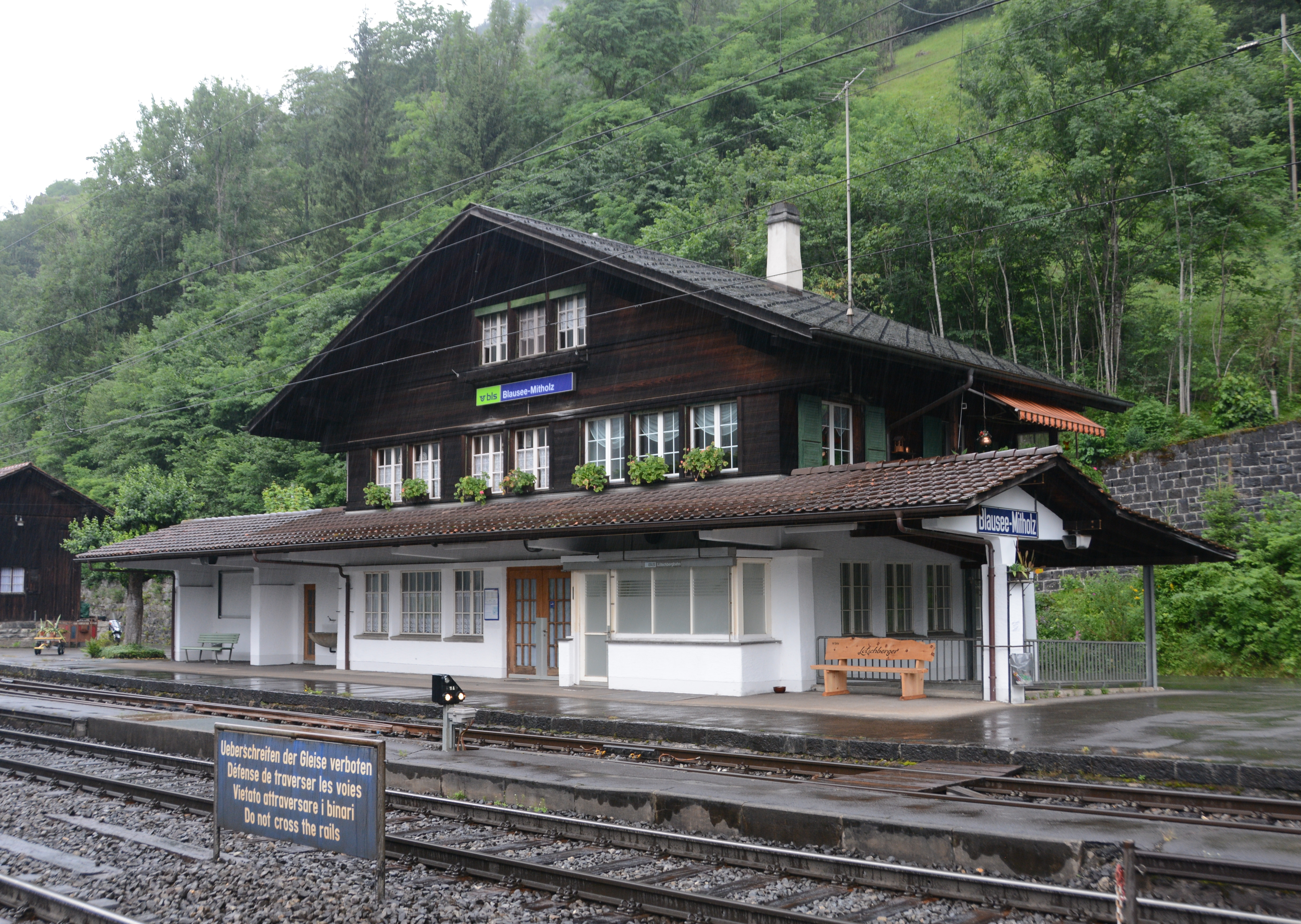
Blausee-Mitholz station

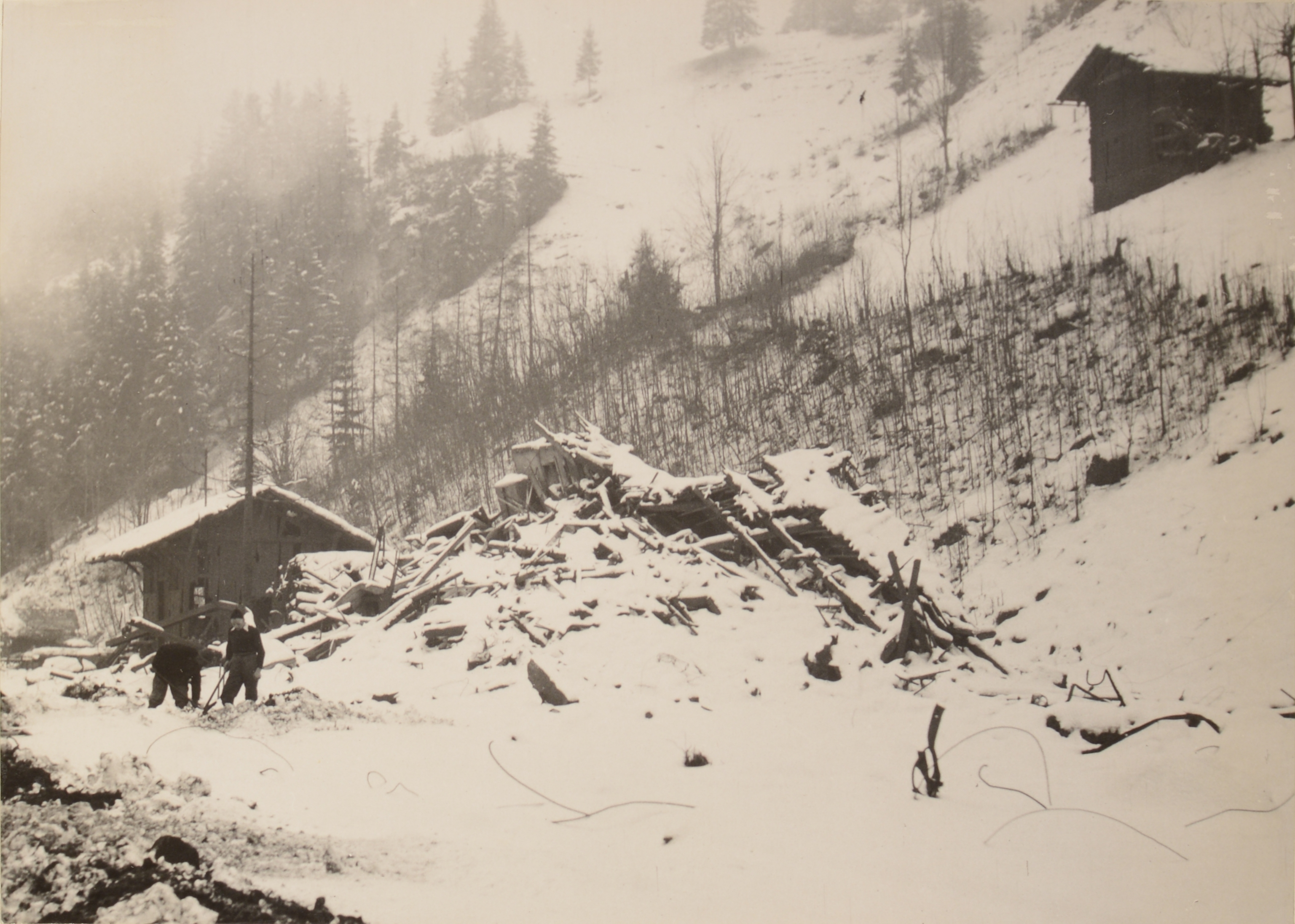
Wreckage of the station, 1947

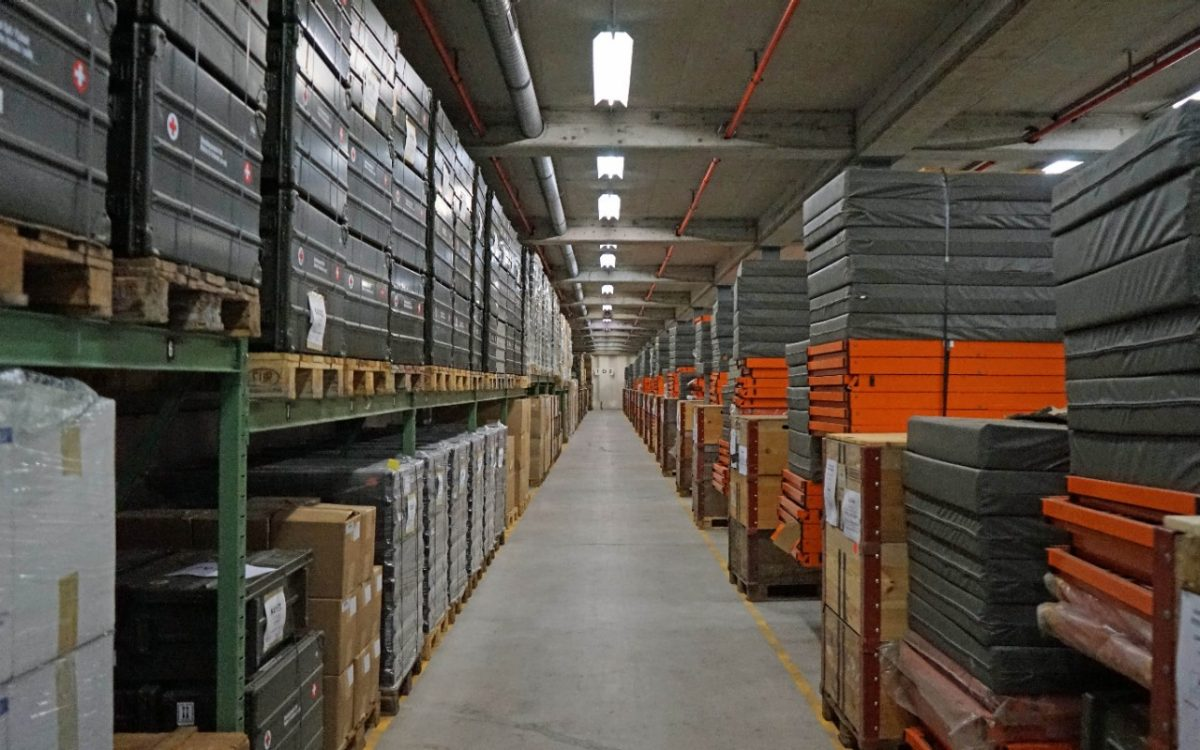
Swiss Armed Forces medical storage in former munitions dump, 2018

== See also ==
- Blausee, the nearby lake
- List of accidents and incidents involving transport or storage of ammunition
