= Kandergrund =

- Municipality
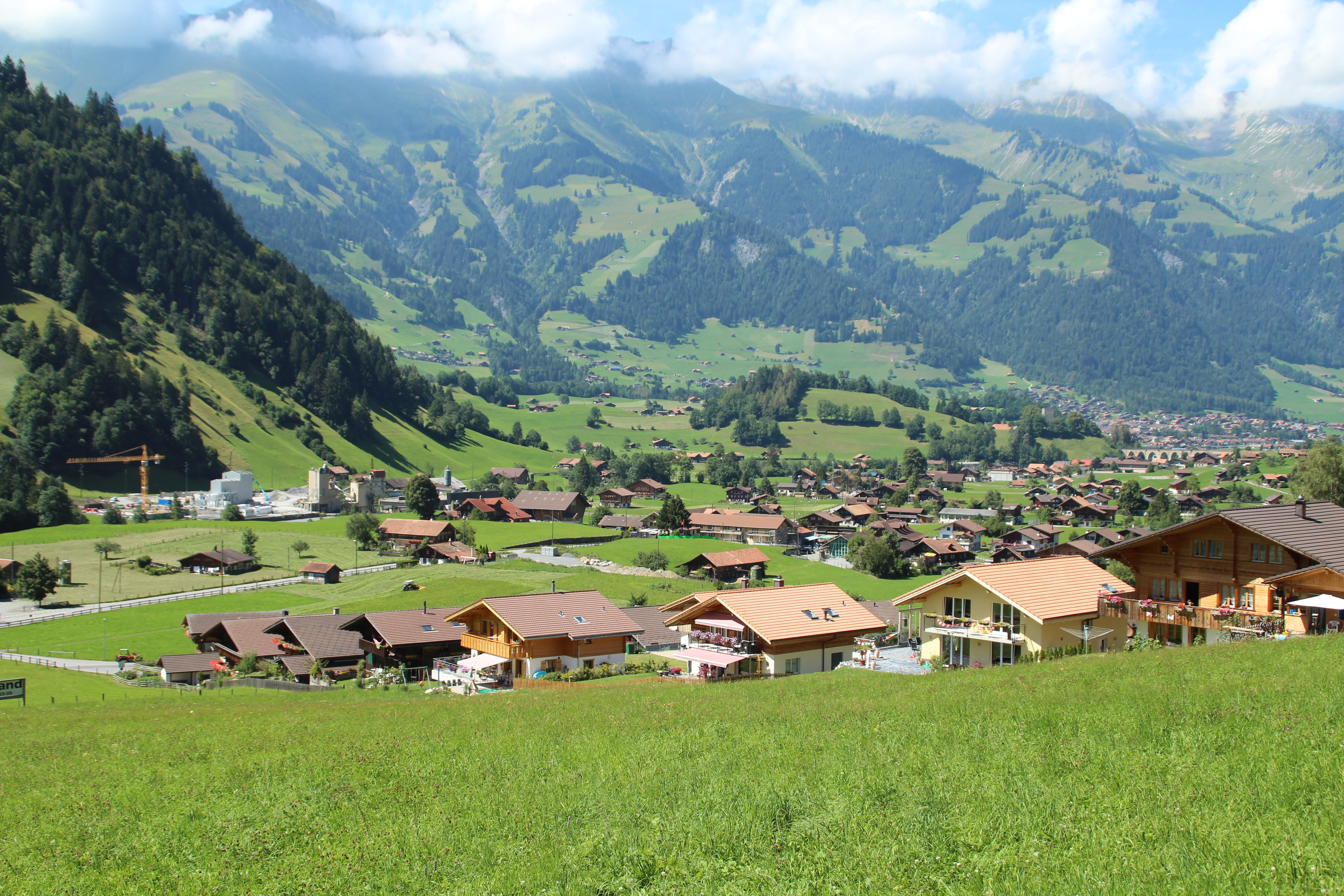
- Kandergrund village

- Flag Coat of arms
- Location of Kandergrund
- Location within Switzerland Location within Canton of Bern
- Coordinates: 46°33′N 7°40′E
- Country: Switzerland
- Canton: Bern
- District: Frutigen-Niedersimmental

Government
  - Executive: Gemeinderat with 5 members
  - Mayor: Gemeindepräsident(in); Roland Stoller (as of 2026)

Area
  - Total: 32.1 km^{2} (12.4 sq mi)
- Elevation: 800 m (2,600 ft)

Population (December 2020)
  - Total: 807
  - Density: 25.1/km^{2} (65.1/sq mi)
- Time zone: UTC+01:00 (CET)
  - Summer (DST): UTC+02:00 (CEST)
- Postal code: 3716
- SFOS number: 564
- ISO 3166 code: CH-BE
- Surrounded by: Frutigen, Kandersteg, Reichenbach im Kandertal
- Website: www.kandergrund.ch

Kandergrund (Swiss Standard German pronunciation: [ˈkandərˌɡrʊnd]) is a municipality in the Frutigen-Niedersimmental administrative district in the canton of Bern in Switzerland.

== History ==
The area may have been lightly inhabited during the Bronze Age, however the earliest documented settlement was around the Castle (now ruins) Felsenburg. Kandergrund, together with Kandersteg, is first mentioned in 1352 as der Kandergrund.

During the Middle Ages, Kandergrund was politically and religiously part of Frutigen. In 1850, it was separated and became an independent municipality, consisting of Ausserrüteni, Innerrüteni, Kandergrund, Mitholz, Kandersteg and Gastern. In 1850 a church was built in Bunderbach, and ten years later that church became the parish church of Kandergrund parish. In 1909 Kandersteg separated from Kandergrund. The population grew dramatically during construction of the Lötschberg Tunnel and the Lötschberg railway line between 1906 and 1913.

== Geography ==
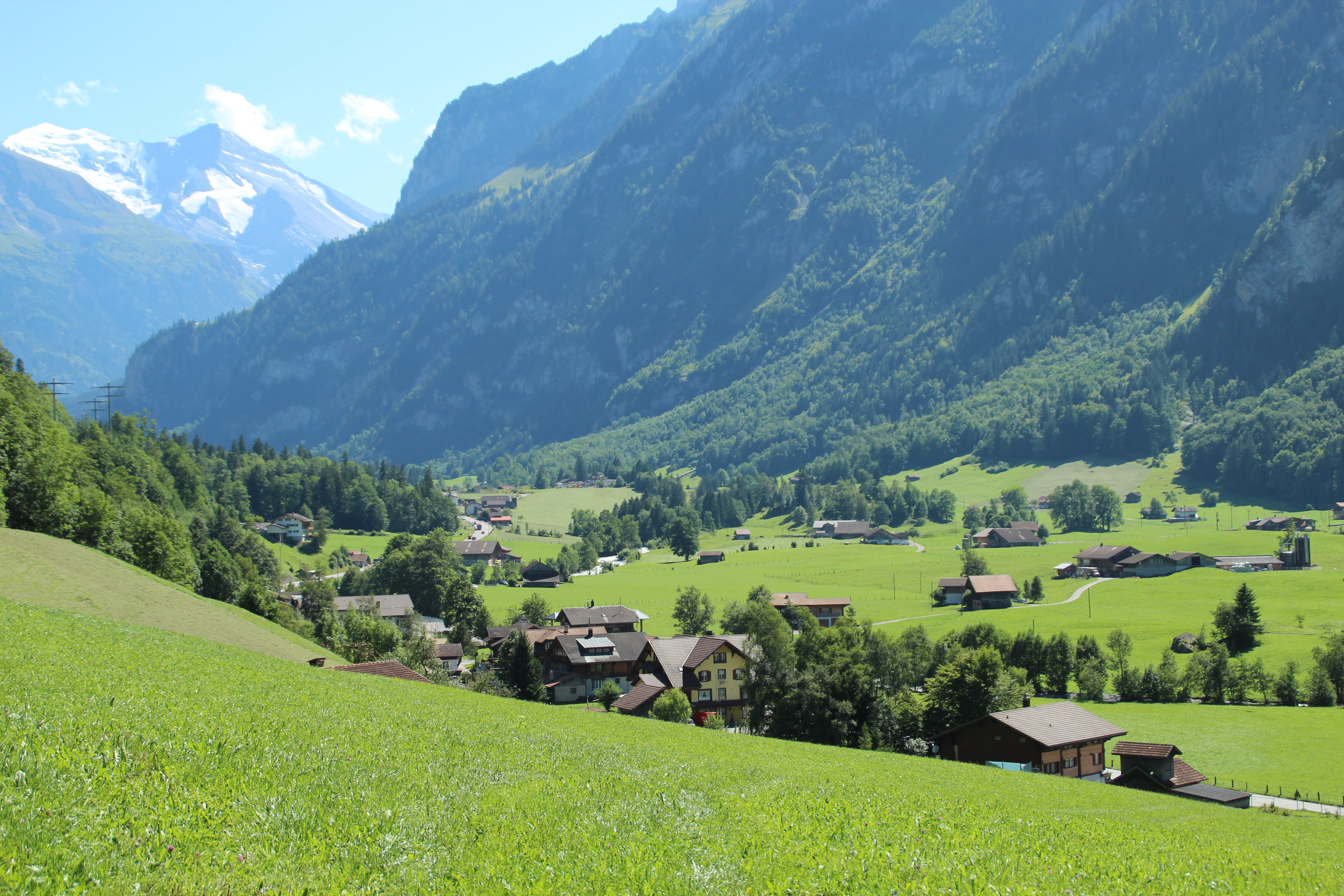
Kandergrund and the Kander valley

Kandergrund has an area of 32.09 km^{2} (12.39 sq mi). Of this area, 10.5 km^{2} (4.1 mi^{2}) or 32.8% is used for agricultural purposes, while 11.83 km^{2} (4.57 mi^{2}) or 36.9% is forested. Of the rest of the land, 1.37 km^{2} (0.53 mi^{2}) or 4.3% is settled (buildings or roads), 0.25 km^{2} (0.097 mi^{2}) or 0.8% is either rivers or lakes and 8.07 km^{2} (3.12 mi^{2}) or 25.2% is unproductive land.

Of the built up area, housing and buildings made up 1.0% and transportation infrastructure made up 1.8%. Power and water infrastructure as well as other special developed areas made up 1.2% of the area Out of the forested land, 32.4% of the total land area is heavily forested and 3.3% is covered with orchards or small clusters of trees. Of the agricultural land, 10.9% is pastures and 21.9% is used for alpine pastures. All the water in the municipality is flowing water. Of the unproductive areas, 11.1% is unproductive vegetation and 14.1% is too rocky for vegetation.

The municipality is located in the upper Kander river valley. It consists of the Bäuerten of Ausser Kandergrund, Inner-Kandergrund, Bunderbach, Mitholz, Reckental and Rüti.

On 31 December 2009 Amtsbezirk Frutigen, the municipality's former district, was dissolved. On the following day, 1 January 2010, it joined the newly created Verwaltungskreis Frutigen-Niedersimmental.

== Coat of arms ==
The blazon of the municipal coat of arms is Vert a triple Bend wavy Argent fimbriated Sable.

== Demographics ==
Kandergrund has a population (as of December 2020) of 807. As of 2010, 5.7% of the population are resident foreign nationals. Over the last 10 years (2000–2010) the population has changed at a rate of −14.1%. Migration accounted for −16.7%, while births and deaths accounted for 1.1%.

Most of the population (as of 2000) speaks German (868 or 91.9%) as their first language, Swedish is the second most common (31 or 3.3%) and Italian is the third (14 or 1.5%). There are 4 people who speak French.

As of 2008, the population was 51.9% male and 48.1% female. The population was made up of 390 Swiss men (48.2% of the population) and 30 (3.7%) non-Swiss men. There were 373 Swiss women (46.1%) and 16 (2.0%) non-Swiss women. Of the population in the municipality, 352 or about 37.2% were born in Kandergrund and lived there in 2000. There were 291 or 30.8% who were born in the same canton, while 54 or 5.7% were born somewhere else in Switzerland, and 229 or 24.2% were born outside of Switzerland.

As of 2010, children and teenagers (0–19 years old) make up 19.7% of the population, while adults (20–64 years old) make up 63% and seniors (over 64 years old) make up 17.3%.

As of 2000, there were 364 people who were single and never married in the municipality. There were 505 married individuals, 46 widows or widowers and 30 individuals who are divorced.

As of 2000, there were 85 households that consist of only one person and 26 households with five or more people. In 2000, a total of 285 apartments (79.6% of the total) were permanently occupied, while 45 apartments (12.6%) were seasonally occupied and 28 apartments (7.8%) were empty. The vacancy rate for the municipality, in 2011, was 1.54%.

The historical population is given in the following chart:

== Heritage sites of national significance ==
The ruin of Felsenburg Castle is listed as a Swiss heritage site of national significance.

The castle ruins of Felsenburg were built in the 12th century, but was abandoned by 1400 and fell into ruins. Currently, only the tower and sections of the walls are visible.

== Politics ==
In the 2011 federal election the most popular party was the Swiss People's Party (SVP) which received 65.9% of the vote. The next three most popular parties were the Conservative Democratic Party (BDP) (12.7%), the Social Democratic Party (SP) (4.8%) and the Green Liberal Party (GLP) (4.6%). In the federal election, a total of 360 votes were cast, and the voter turnout was 54.6%.

== Economy ==
As of 2011, Kandergrund had an unemployment rate of 0.65%. As of 2008, there were a total of 284 people employed in the municipality. Of these, there were 130 people employed in the primary economic sector and about 42 businesses involved in this sector. 59 people were employed in the secondary sector and there were 15 businesses in this sector. 95 people were employed in the tertiary sector, with 21 businesses in this sector. There were 577 residents of the municipality who were employed in some capacity, of which females made up 27.7% of the workforce.

In 2008 there were a total of 204 full-time equivalent jobs. The number of jobs in the primary sector was 76, of which 64 were in agriculture, 1 was in forestry or lumber production and 11 were in fishing or fisheries. The number of jobs in the secondary sector was 55 of which 25 or (45.5%) were in manufacturing and 30 (54.5%) were in construction. The number of jobs in the tertiary sector was 73. In the tertiary sector; 12 or 16.4% were in wholesale or retail sales or the repair of motor vehicles, 5 or 6.8% were in the movement and storage of goods, 41 or 56.2% were in a hotel or restaurant, 2 or 2.7% were technical professionals or scientists, 4 or 5.5% were in education.

In 2000, there were 100 workers who commuted into the municipality and 219 workers who commuted away. The municipality is a net exporter of workers, with about 2.2 workers leaving the municipality for every one entering. Of the working population, 39.7% used public transportation to get to work, and 37.8% used a private car.

== Transport ==
The municipality is transited by the Lötschberg railway line, but it does not include any railway stations. Instead the nearest railway access points are Kandersteg station, to the south, and Frutigen station, to the north. The municipality is served by a PostAuto bus service which links it to both those stations.

== Religion ==
From the 2000 census, 80 or 8.5% were Roman Catholic, while 613 or 64.9% belonged to the Swiss Reformed Church. Of the rest of the population, there were 3 members of an Orthodox church (or about 0.32% of the population), and there were 44 individuals (or about 4.66% of the population) who belonged to another Christian church. There were 21 (or about 2.22% of the population) who were Islamic. There was 1 person who was Buddhist. 171 (or about 18.10% of the population) belonged to no church, are agnostic or atheist, and 34 individuals (or about 3.60% of the population) did not answer the question.

== Education ==
In Kandergrund about 382 or (40.4%) of the population have completed non-mandatory upper secondary education, and 37 or (3.9%) have completed additional higher education (either university or a Fachhochschule). Of the 37 who completed tertiary schooling, 48.6% were Swiss men, 13.5% were Swiss women, 35.1% were non-Swiss men.

The Canton of Bern school system provides one year of non-obligatory Kindergarten, followed by six years of Primary school. This is followed by three years of obligatory lower Secondary school where the students are separated according to ability and aptitude. Following the lower Secondary students may attend additional schooling or they may enter an apprenticeship.

During the 2010–11 school year, there were a total of 79 students attending classes in Kandergrund. There was one kindergarten class with a total of 14 students in the municipality. The municipality had 2 primary classes and 46 students. During the same year, there was one lower secondary class with a total of 19 students. and 10.5% have a different mother language than the classroom language.

As of 2000, there were 31 students from Kandergrund who attended schools outside the municipality.
