= Mülenen railway station =

Railway station in Mülenen, Switzerland

Mülenen
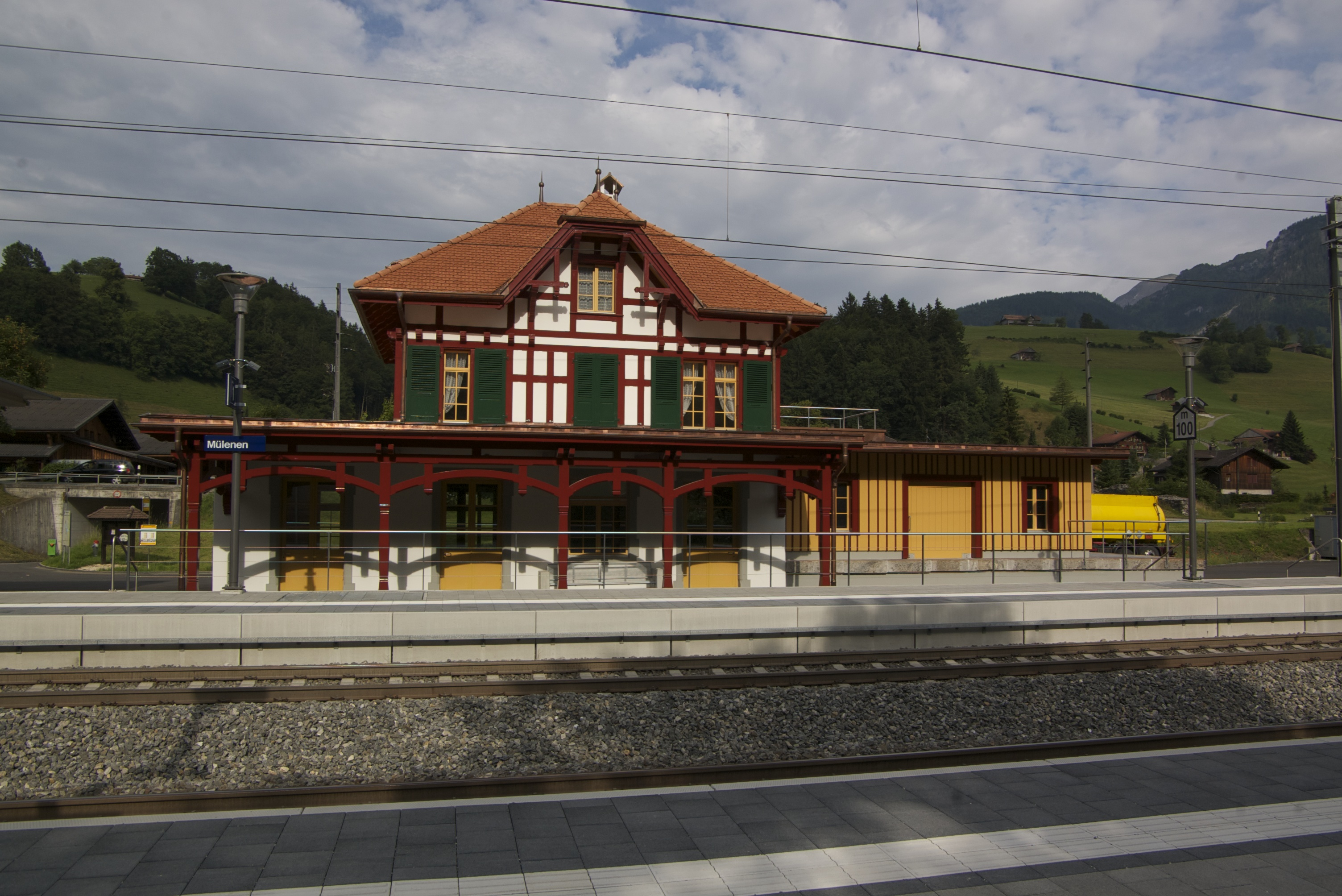
- The station building in 2013

General information
- Location: Stationstrasse; Mülenen; Switzerland
- Coordinates: 46°38′19″N 7°41′27″E
- Elevation: 692 m (2,270 ft)
- Owner: BLS AG
- Line: Lötschberg line
- Distance: 6.9 km (4.3 mi) from Spiez
- Platforms: 2 side platforms
- Tracks: 2
- Train operators: BLS AG
- Connections: Niesenbahn funicular; PostAuto AG buses

Construction
- Parking: Yes (17 spaces)
- Accessible: Yes

Other information
- Station code: 8507481 (MUE)
- Fare zone: 830 (Libero)

Passengers
- 2023: 280 per weekday (BLS)

Services
| Preceding station | BLS | Following station |
|---|---|---|
| Spiez towards Bern | RE1 | Reichenbach im Kandertal towards Brig or Domodossola |
| Spiez towards Biel/Bienne | RE11 Weekends only | Reichenbach im Kandertal towards Brig |
| Spiez Terminus | R12 | Reichenbach im Kandertal towards Frutigen |
Location

Mülenen is a railway station in the Swiss canton of Bern. The station is located on the Lötschberg line of the BLS AG, and is in the village of Mülenen. Both village and station are divided by the boundary between the municipalities of Reichenbach im Kandertal and Aeschi bei Spiez. The lower station of the Niesenbahn funicular, which provides a link to the summit of the Niesen mountain, is adjacent to the station.

== Services ==
As of the December 2024 timetable change, the following services stop at Mülenen:

- RegioExpress:
  - hourly service to Bern and Brig, with most trains continuing from Brig to Domodossola.
  - daily service on weekends during the high season to Biel/Bienne and Brig.
- Regio: rush hour service to Spiez and Frutigen.
