= Morgenberghorn =

Mountain in Switzerland

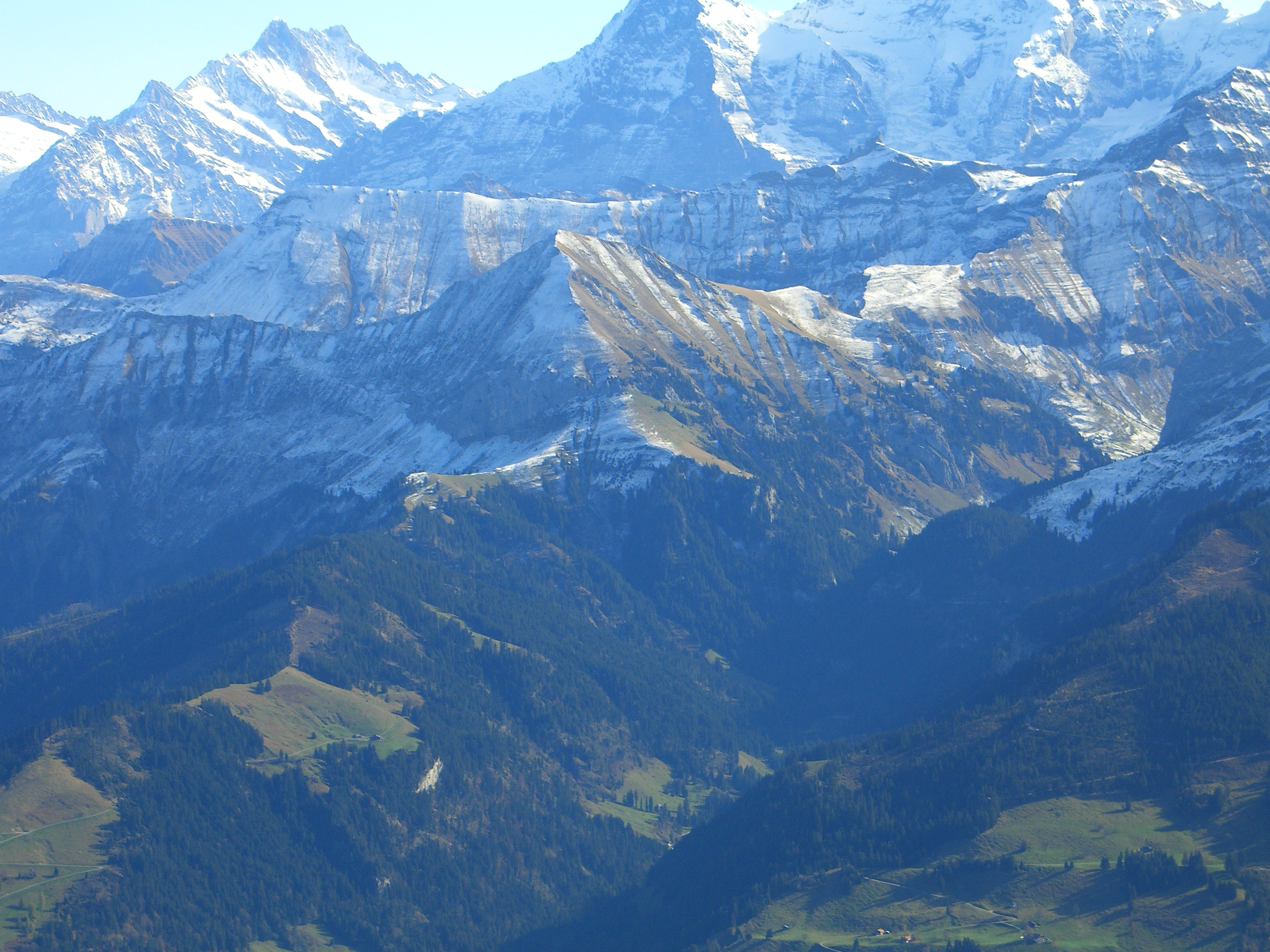
- The Morgenberghorn (middle) from the Niesen (west side)

Highest point
- Elevation: 2,249 m (7,379 ft)
- Prominence: 370 m (1,210 ft)
- Coordinates: 46°37′19.8″N 7°47′36.8″E

Geography
- Location within Switzerland
- Location: Bern, Switzerland
- Parent range: Bernese Alps

The Morgenberghorn is a mountain of the Bernese Alps, overlooking Lake Thun in the Bernese Oberland. It lies at the northern end of the chain between the valleys of Frutigen and Lauterbrunnen, north of the Schwalmere.
