= Fromberghorn =

Mountain of the Bernese Alps

- Fromberghore
- Location within Switzerland

Highest point
- Elevation: 2,394 m (7,854 ft)
- Prominence: 99 m (325 ft)
- Parent peak: Drunengalm
- Coordinates: 46°37′58.5″N 7°37′38.5″E

Geography
- Location: Switzerland
- Parent range: Bernese Alps

The Fromberghorn (or Fromberghore) is a mountain of the Bernese Alps, located between Diemtigen and Reichenbach im Kandertal in the Bernese Oberland. It lies just south of the Niesen.
