= Aris ob Kien Castle =

Castle in Reichenbach im Kandertal, Switzerland

- Burg Aris ob Kien (German)
- Location within Canton of Bern Location within Switzerland
- 46°36′31″N 7°41′44″E
- Location: Reichenbach im Kandertal, Canton of Bern, Switzerland

History
- Built: 12th century

Site notes
- Restored: 1934

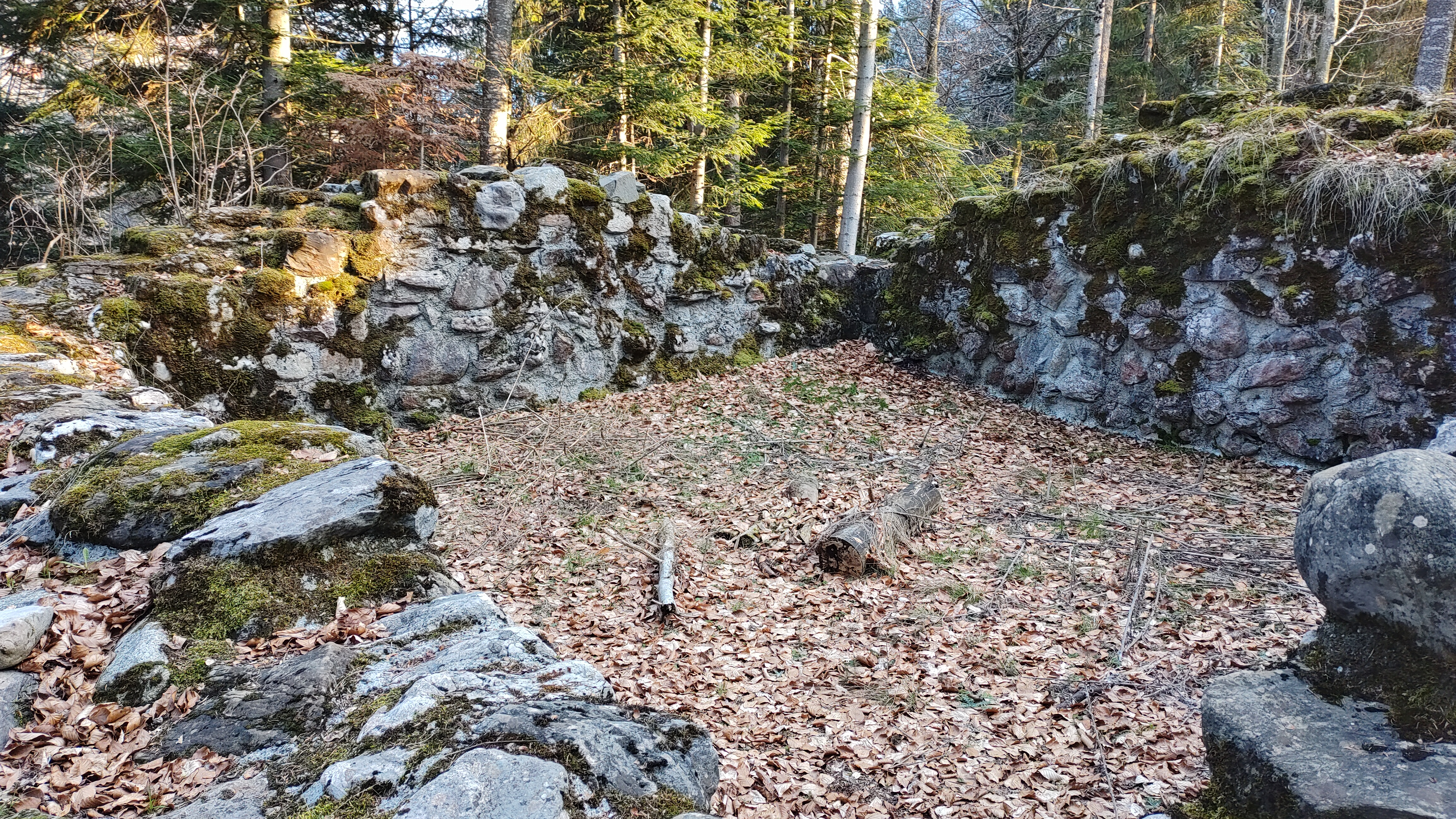

Aris ob Kien Castle (German: Burg Aris ob Kien) is a ruined medieval castle from the 12th Century. It is located in the municipality of Reichenbach im Kandertal in the Swiss canton of Bern.

== History ==
The castle was probably built in the 12th century as the family seat of the Freiherr von Kien. In the 13th century they abandoned the castle and moved to their second castle, the nearby Mülenen Castle. In 1934 the ruined castle was restored.

== Location and description ==
The castle is located near the Kiene stream, a tributary of the Kander river.

The 1934 renovation cleared and repaired the remaining castle. Today it is still well preserved, with parts of the castle tower, the moat, earthen walls and two ditches still visible. However, a third trench is no longer visible.
