= Reichenbach im Kandertal =

- Municipality
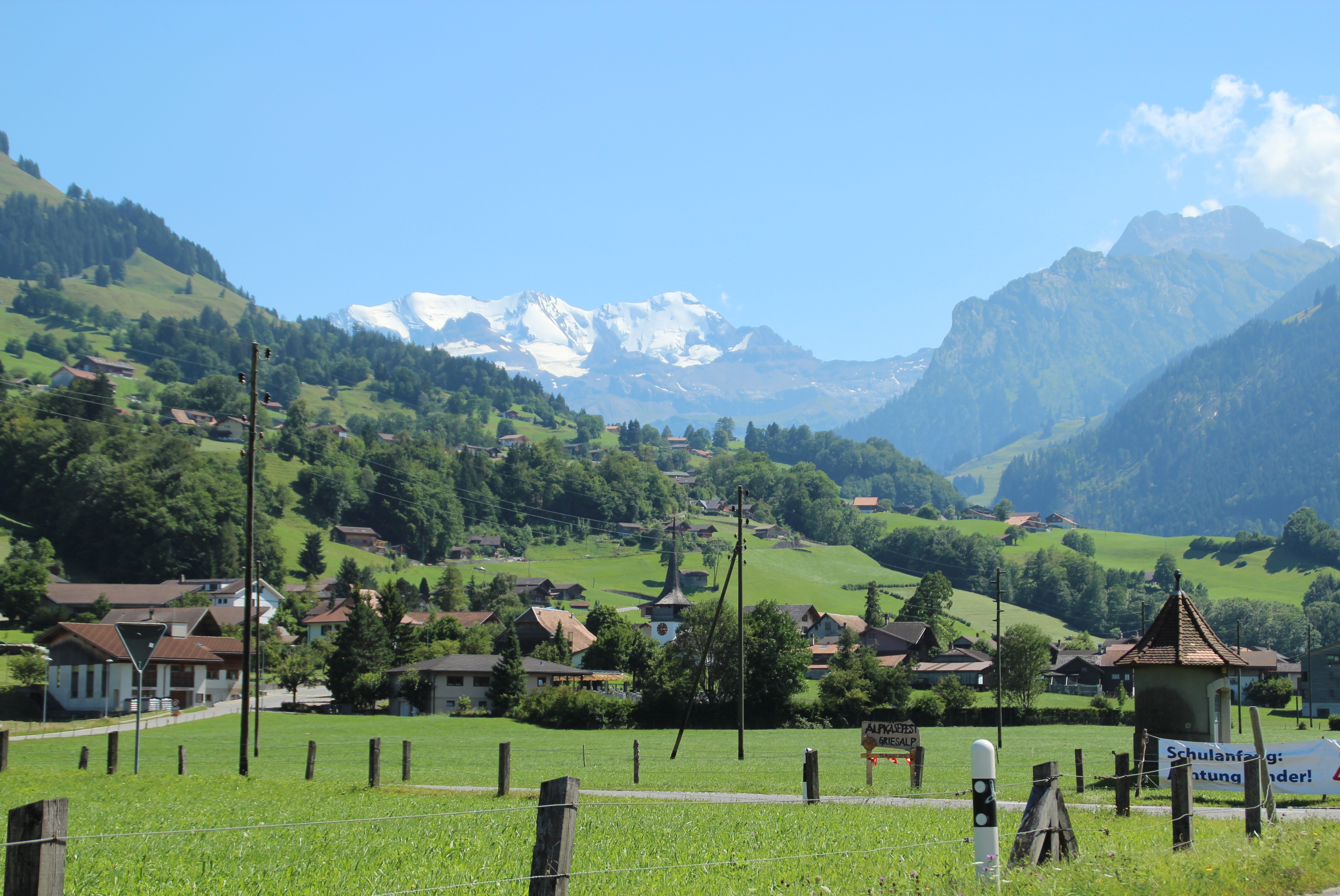
- Reichenbach im Kandertal village

- Flag Coat of arms
- Location of Reichenbach im Kandertal
- Location within Switzerland Location within Canton of Bern
- Coordinates: 46°35′N 7°39′E
- Country: Switzerland
- Canton: Bern
- District: Frutigen-Niedersimmental

Government
  - Executive: Gemeinderat with 7 members
  - Mayor: Gemeindepräsident(in)/Obmann; Martin Gerber-Müller (as of 2026)

Area
  - Total: 125.8 km^{2} (48.6 sq mi)
- Elevation: 700 m (2,300 ft)

Population (December 2020)
  - Total: 3,638
  - Density: 28.92/km^{2} (74.90/sq mi)
- Time zone: UTC+01:00 (CET)
  - Summer (DST): UTC+02:00 (CEST)
- Postal code: 3713
- SFOS number: 567
- ISO 3166 code: CH-BE
- Localities: Griesalp, Kiental, Reichenbach
- Surrounded by: Aeschi bei Spiez, Diemtigen, Frutigen, Kandergrund, Kandersteg, Lauterbrunnen, Wimmis
- Website: https://www.reichenbach.ch/

Reichenbach im Kandertal (lit. 'Reichenbach in the Kander valley') is a village and municipality in the Frutigen-Niedersimmental administrative district in the canton of Bern in Switzerland. Until 1957 it was known as Reichenbach bei Frutigen. Besides the village of Reichenbach, the municipality includes several other settlements, including Aris, Faltschen, Griesalp, Kien, Kiental, Ramslauenen, Reudlen, Scharnachtal, Schwandi and Wengi. Additionally, the village of Mülenen is shared between Reichenbach and Aeschi bei Spiez municipalities.

The area played a notable role in world history when the Kienthal Conference was held at Kiental (then known as Kienthal) in 1916.

The blazon of the municipal coat of arms is Argent a Bear Paw issuant from a Mount of 3 Coupeaux Vert.

== History ==
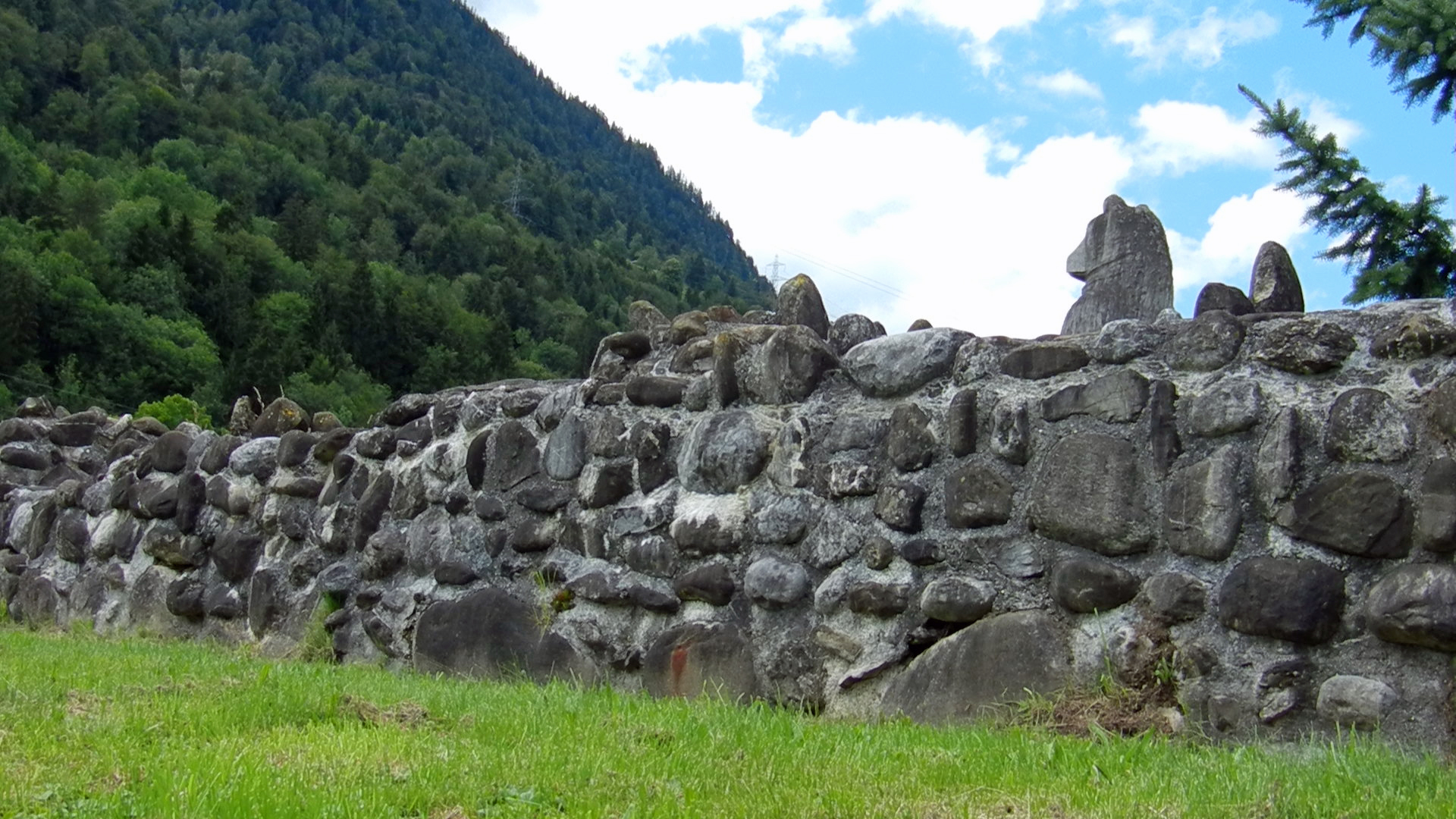
View of the Letzi Mülenen wall

Aerial view (1952)

Reichenbach im Kandertal is first mentioned about 1320 as Richenbach. During the Middle Ages, the village occupied a strategic location on the trade route into the Canton of Valais. Two castles, Mülenen Castle, with the Letzi Mülenen wall, and Aris ob Kien Castle, were built during the Middle Ages to guard the road. A third castle, Faltschen Castle, may also be medieval, but this is not definitively known. The village was part of the Herrschaft of Mülenen. In 1352, Bern acquired the Herrschaft and with it the village.

Originally Reichenbach was part of the parish of Aeschi bei Spiez. During the 15th century the chapel of St. Nicholas was built in the village. The chapel was first mentioned in 1453 and rebuilt in 1484. During the 18th and 19th centuries it was renovated and expanded. After Bern accepted the Protestant Reformation, Reichenbach converted to the new faith in 1529 and created its own parish. A filial church was established in the village of Kiental in 1929, while Wengi and Schwandi are still part of the Frutigen parish.

Traditionally the villages lived from farming and seasonal alpine herding as well as some trade over the mountain pass. Beginning in the 16th century, the local farmers began raising cattle for export. In 1865 a match stick factory opened in the area.

The post carriage began operating between Reichenbach and Thun in 1814. In 1901 a railroad was completed that linked the municipality with Spiez. This was followed by the Niesen train in 1910 and the Bern-Lötschberg-Simplon Railway in 1913. The new transportation links quickly changed Reichenbach into a tourist destination. The population grew and many vacation homes were built in the municipality. A military airport was built in the valley, but in 1994 it switched to a completely civilian airport. A secondary school was built in 1959–60.

The Kienthal Conference was held in Kiental between 24 and 30 April 1916. The conference was a follow-on from the Zimmerwald Conference of the previous year, which Vladimir Lenin described as the "first step" in the development of an international movement against World War I. The manifesto drawn up by the Kienthal Conference was an advance on the Zimmerwald Manifesto and helped to crystallize the internationalist elements of whom the Communist Third International was subsequently formed.

On 31 December 2009 Amtsbezirk Frutigen, the municipality's former district, was dissolved. On the following day, 1 January 2010, it joined the newly created Verwaltungskreis Frutigen-Niedersimmental.

== Geography ==
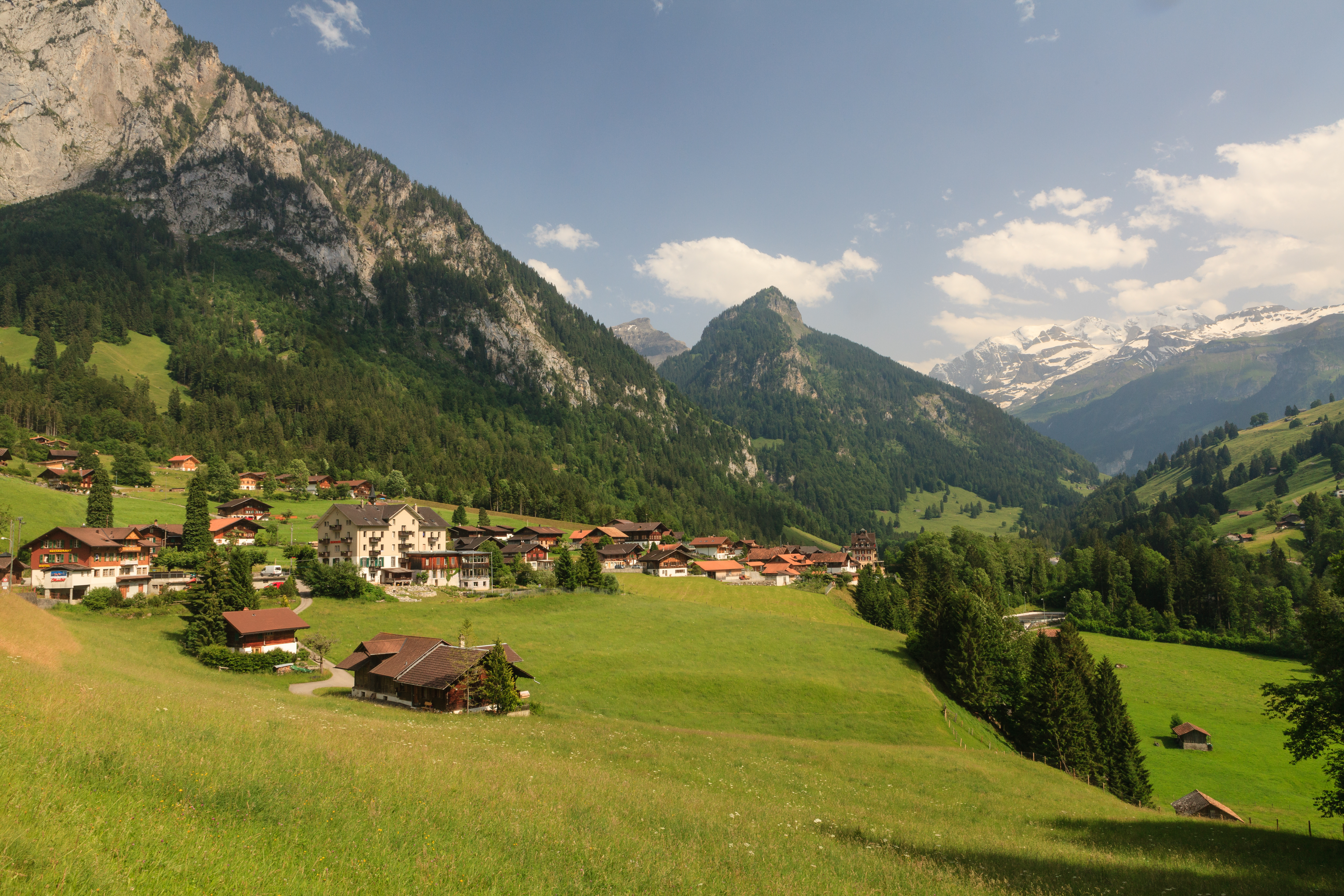
The village of Kiental and the valley of the Chiene river.

The village of Reichenbach im Kandertal lies in the valley of the Kander river, and the municipality includes a 4.5 km (2.8 mi) long section of this valley and the slopes on either side. However it also extends some 16.5 km (10.3 mi) up the valley of the Chiene river, from its confluence with the Kander to its source below the Schilthorn and the Blüemlisalp massif. From the upper part of the Chiene valley, rough tracks cross the Sefinafurgga and Hohtürli passes towards Lauterbrunnen and Kandersteg respectively, forming part of the Alpine Pass Route, a long-distance hiking trail across Switzerland between Sargans and Montreux.

The settlements of Aris, Faltsche, Mülenen, Reichenbach, Reudlen, Schwandi and Wengi all lie in or on the slopes of the Kander valley, whilst Griesalp, Kien, Kiental, Ramslauenen and Scharnachtal lie in the Chiene valley. The peaks of the Ärmighorn, Bütlasse, Drättehorn, Dreispitz, Drunengalm, Dündenhorn, Fromberghorn, Gspaltenhorn, Hundshorn, Morgenhorn, Niesen, Schwalmere, Wätterlatte and Wildi Frau are all within, or on, the municipal boundary.

The municipality has an area of 125.77 km^{2} (48.56 sq mi). Of this area, 49.41 km^{2} (19.08 mi^{2}) or 39.3% is used for agricultural purposes, while 30.83 km^{2} (11.90 mi^{2}) or 24.5% is forested. Of the rest of the land, 2.84 km^{2} (1.10 mi^{2}) or 2.3% is settled (buildings or roads), 1.42 km^{2} (0.55 mi^{2}) or 1.1% is either rivers or lakes and 41.25 km^{2} (15.93 mi^{2}) or 32.8% is unproductive land.

Of the built up area, housing and buildings made up 1.0% and transportation infrastructure made up 1.0%. Out of the forested land, 20.8% of the total land area is heavily forested and 2.7% is covered with orchards or small clusters of trees. Of the agricultural land, 9.6% is pastures and 29.4% is used for alpine pastures. All the water in the municipality is flowing water. Of the unproductive areas, 8.9% is unproductive vegetation, 21.7% is too rocky for vegetation and 2.3% of the land is covered by glaciers.

== Demographics ==
Reichenbach im Kandertal has a population (as of December 2020) of 3,638. As of 2010, 3.9% of the population are resident foreign nationals. Between 2000 and 2010, the population increased at a rate of 6.3%. Migration accounted for 2.7%, while births and deaths accounted for 1.4%.

Most of the population (as of 2000) speaks German (3,230 or 97.1%) as their first language, Albanian is the second most common (26 or 0.8%) and French is the third (17 or 0.5%). There are 6 people who speak Italian and 1 person who speaks Romansh.

As of 2008, the population was 49.1% male and 50.9% female. The population was made up of 1,621 Swiss men (47.2% of the population) and 65 (1.9%) non-Swiss men. There were 1,677 Swiss women (48.8%) and 70 (2.0%) non-Swiss women. Of the population in the municipality, 1,690 or about 50.8% were born in Reichenbach im Kandertal and lived there in 2000. There were 1,089 or 32.8% who were born in the same canton, while 257 or 7.7% were born somewhere else in Switzerland, and 140 or 4.2% were born outside of Switzerland.

As of 2010, children and teenagers (0–19 years old) make up 22.2% of the population, while adults (20–64 years old) make up 58.1% and seniors (over 64 years old) make up 19.7%.

As of 2000, there were 1,377 people who were single and never married in the municipality. There were 1,642 married individuals, 222 widows or widowers and 84 individuals who are divorced.

As of 2000, there were 359 households that consist of only one person and 136 households with five or more people. In 2000, a total of 1,221 apartments (71.9% of the total) were permanently occupied, while 351 apartments (20.7%) were seasonally occupied and 126 apartments (7.4%) were empty. As of 2010, the construction rate of new housing units was 7.9 new units per 1000 residents. The vacancy rate for the municipality, in 2011, was 0.6%.

The historical population is given in the following chart:

== Sights ==
Since 1910, the nearby mountain of Niesen (altitude 2,362 m [7,749 ft]) can be ascended at gradients of up to 68% via the Niesenbahn, which with a length of 3,499 m (11,480 ft) is the longest funicular railway in Europe.

In summer, Griesalp and the Kiental valley is known for its mountain hikes and high altitude treks, with some 250 kilometres (160 mi) of hiking trails, flower meadows, forests, streams and waterfalls. In winter, the same area becomes a skiing area. The upper stretch of the valley is part of the Jungfrau-Aletsch World Heritage Site.

== Heritage sites of national significance ==
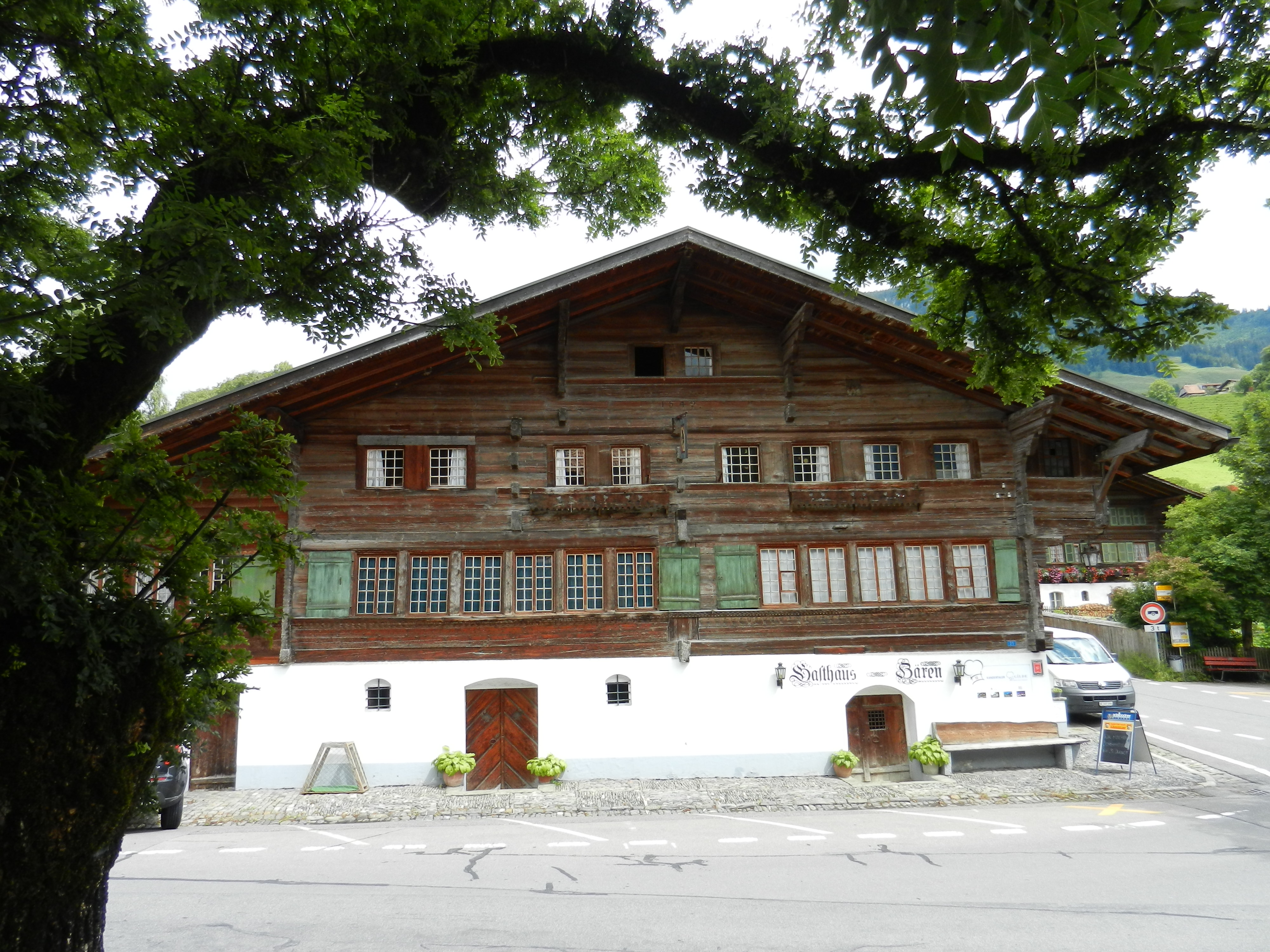
Gasthof Bären

The Gasthof Bären, the Letzi Mülenen (a medieval fortified wall) and the Notar-Sieber-House are listed as Swiss heritage site of national significance.

The Letzi Mülenen was a castle and wall built in the 12th and 13th century by the Freiherr von Kien to control access to the alpine pass into the Canton of Valais. The castle passed to the Freiherr von Wädenswil and the Lord of Turn who became indebted fighting against Bern. After passing through several other owners, it was sold in 1352 to Bern. Under Bernese rule it was the home of a castellan who managed the military and the high and low courts. However, by about 1400, the castellan moved to Frutigen and abandoned Mülenen. The castle and wall were demolished and used as a source of construction materials.

== Politics ==
In the 2011 federal election the most popular party was the Swiss People's Party (SVP) which received 48.7% of the vote. The next three most popular parties were the Conservative Democratic Party (BDP) (14.8%), the Social Democratic Party (SP) (8.9%) and the Federal Democratic Union of Switzerland (EDU) (7%). In the federal election, a total of 1,411 votes were cast, and the voter turnout was 52.4%.

== Economy ==
As of 2011, Reichenbach im Kandertal had an unemployment rate of 0.75%. As of 2008, there were a total of 1,290 people employed in the municipality. Of these, there were 361 people employed in the primary economic sector and about 136 businesses involved in this sector. 421 people were employed in the secondary sector and there were 64 businesses in this sector. 508 people were employed in the tertiary sector, with 89 businesses in this sector. There were 1,659 residents of the municipality who were employed in some capacity, of which females made up 41.5% of the workforce.

In 2008 there were a total of 943 full-time equivalent jobs. The number of jobs in the primary sector was 200, all of which were in agriculture. The number of jobs in the secondary sector was 378 of which 201 or (53.2%) were in manufacturing, 1 was in mining and 176 (46.6%) were in construction. The number of jobs in the tertiary sector was 365. In the tertiary sector; 120 or 32.9% were in wholesale or retail sales or the repair of motor vehicles, 19 or 5.2% were in the movement and storage of goods, 101 or 27.7% were in a hotel or restaurant, 11 or 3.0% were technical professionals or scientists, 32 or 8.8% were in education and 54 or 14.8% were in health care.

In 2000, there were 321 workers who commuted into the municipality and 877 workers who commuted away. The municipality is a net exporter of workers, with about 2.7 workers leaving the municipality for every one entering. Of the working population, 12.9% used public transportation to get to work, and 57.6% used a private car.

== Transport ==
The municipality of Reichenbach im Kandertal is served by two railway stations, Reichenbach im Kandertal station and Mülenen station. Both of these are on the Lötschberg line and are served by hourly RegioExpress Lötschberger trains to Bern, Thun, Spiez and Brig.

The municipality is also served by PostAuto bus services from the Reichenbach railway station up the valley of the Kander river to Reudlen, Wengi and Frutigen, and up the valley of the Chiene river to Scharnachtal, Kiental and Griesalp. The latter service is advertised by PostAuto as the steepest post bus service in Europe.

The Niesenbahn funicular links Mülenen station with the summit of the Niesen, and a chair lift links Kiental with Ramslauenen.

== Religion ==
From the 2000 census, 129 or 3.9% were Roman Catholic, while 2,710 or 81.5% belonged to the Swiss Reformed Church. Of the rest of the population, there were 8 members of an Orthodox church (or about 0.24% of the population), and there were 332 individuals (or about 9.98% of the population) who belonged to another Christian church. There was 1 individual who was Jewish, and 20 (or about 0.60% of the population) who were Islamic. There were 3 individuals who were Buddhist, 5 individuals who were Hindu and 5 individuals who belonged to another church. 117 (or about 3.52% of the population) belonged to no church, are agnostic or atheist, and 159 individuals (or about 4.78% of the population) did not answer the question.

== Education ==
In Reichenbach im Kandertal about 1,291 or (38.8%) of the population have completed non-mandatory upper secondary education, and 211 or (6.3%) have completed additional higher education (either university or a Fachhochschule). Of the 211 who completed tertiary schooling, 76.8% were Swiss men, 15.2% were Swiss women, 4.7% were non-Swiss men and 3.3% were non-Swiss women.

The Canton of Bern school system provides one year of non-obligatory Kindergarten, followed by six years of Primary school. This is followed by three years of obligatory lower Secondary school where the students are separated according to ability and aptitude. Following the lower Secondary students may attend additional schooling or they may enter an apprenticeship.

During the 2010–11 school year, there were a total of 382 students attending classes in Reichenbach im Kandertal. There were 4 kindergarten classes with a total of 62 students in the municipality. Of the kindergarten students, 3.2% were permanent or temporary residents of Switzerland (not citizens) and 3.2% have a different mother language than the classroom language. The municipality had 12 primary classes and 211 students. Of the primary students, 5.2% were permanent or temporary residents of Switzerland (not citizens) and 5.7% have a different mother language than the classroom language. During the same year, there were 6 lower secondary classes with a total of 109 students. There were 1.8% who were permanent or temporary residents of Switzerland (not citizens) and 2.8% have a different mother language than the classroom language.

As of 2000, there were 18 students in Reichenbach im Kandertal who came from another municipality, while 93 residents attended schools outside the municipality.

Reichenbach im Kandertal is home to the Dorfbibliothek Reichenbach library. The library has (as of 2008) 7,898 books or other media, and loaned out 13,817 items in the same year. It was open a total of 300 days with average of 14 hours per week during that year.
