= Krattigen =

- Municipality
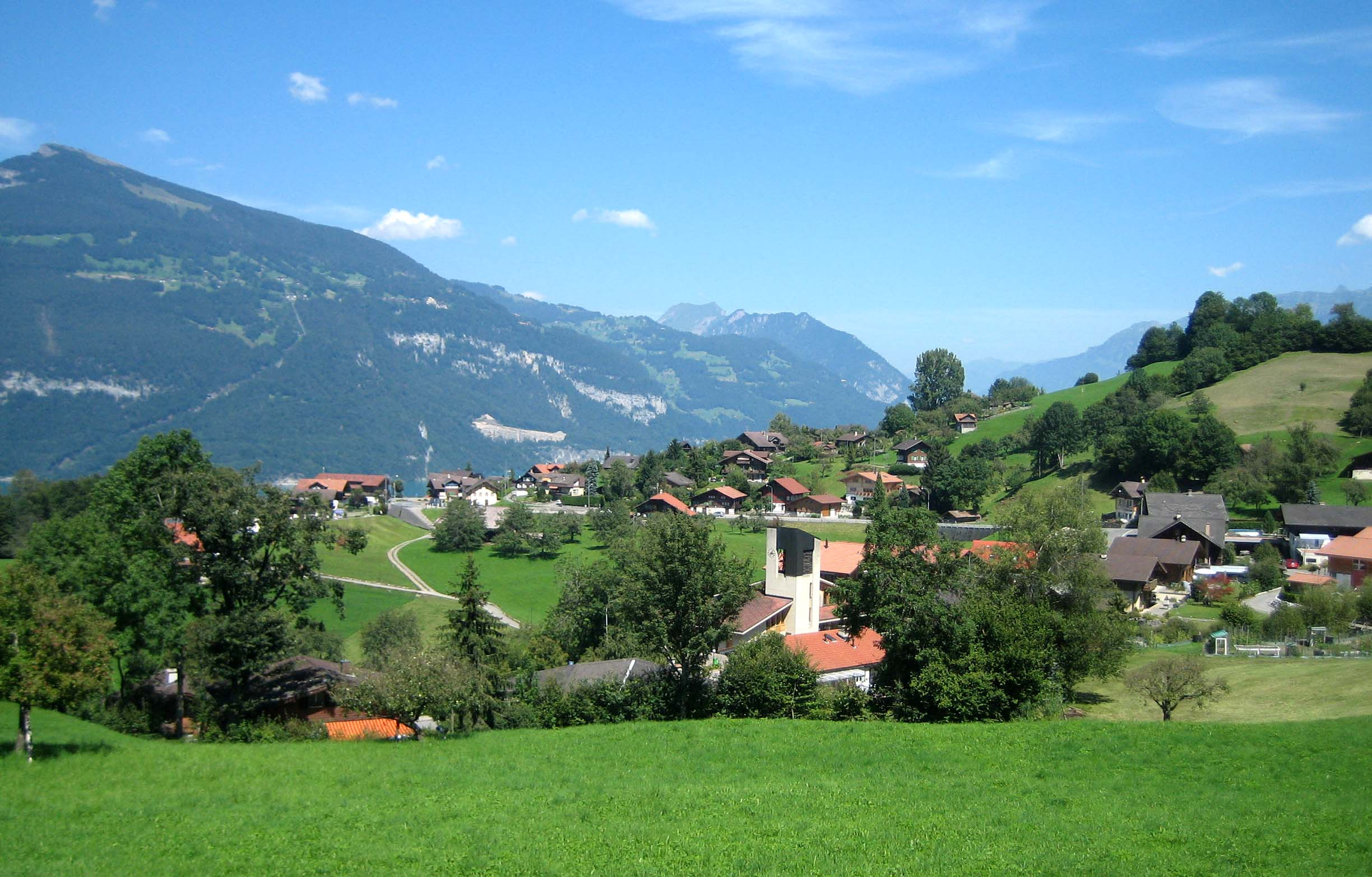

- Flag Coat of arms
- Location of Krattigen
- Location within Switzerland Location within Canton of Bern
- Coordinates: 46°39′N 7°43′E
- Country: Switzerland
- Canton: Bern
- District: Frutigen-Niedersimmental

Government
  - Executive: Gemeinderat with 5 members
  - Mayor: Gemeindepräsident(in); Daniel Kummer (as of 2026)

Area
  - Total: 6.0 km^{2} (2.3 sq mi)
- Elevation: 712 m (2,336 ft)

Population (December 2020)
  - Total: 1,130
  - Density: 190/km^{2} (490/sq mi)
- Time zone: UTC+01:00 (CET)
  - Summer (DST): UTC+02:00 (CEST)
- Postal code: 3704
- SFOS number: 566
- ISO 3166 code: CH-BE
- Surrounded by: Aeschi bei Spiez, Beatenberg, Leissigen, Sigriswil, Spiez
- Website: www.krattigen.ch

Krattigen is a municipality in the Frutigen-Niedersimmental administrative district in the canton of Bern in Switzerland.

It is located on a hill overlooking Lake Thun.

== History ==
Aerial view (1952)

Krattigen is first mentioned around 1300 as Krattingen.

The earliest trace of a settlement in the area is a Late Bronze Age axe which was discovered at Krattigengraben. During the Middle Ages, Rotenbühl Castle was built near the village. The castle does not appear in any contemporary record and only the moat is still visible today. The village was first mentioned as a part of the Herrschaft of the Freiherr of Eschenbach. By 1300 it was a fief of the Lords of Corbières. Soon thereafter it became a fief of the Bernese Schultheiss Kuno Muenzer. After the regicide of King Albert I of Germany by his nephew John Parricida in 1308, the Austrian Habsburgs advanced a claim on Krattigen. The Bernese Scharnachtal family began buying the rights to the area in 1366 and in 1483 they finally owned the entire village. However, in 1513, Bern acquired the village and placed it under their representative at Mülenen. Later Bern placed the village under Frutigen.

Historically the village was part of the large parish of Aeschi. A filial church was eventually built in Krattigen.

Traditionally the local economy was based on agriculture and seasonal alpine herding. In the 18th century a gypsum mine opened near the village. Today the mine is part of the Leissigen gypsum factory. Small businesses and tourism began to make inroads into the village during the 20th century. While the municipality lacks a connection to the Swiss Federal Railways network, almost three-quarters of the working population commute to jobs outside the municipality.

== Geography ==
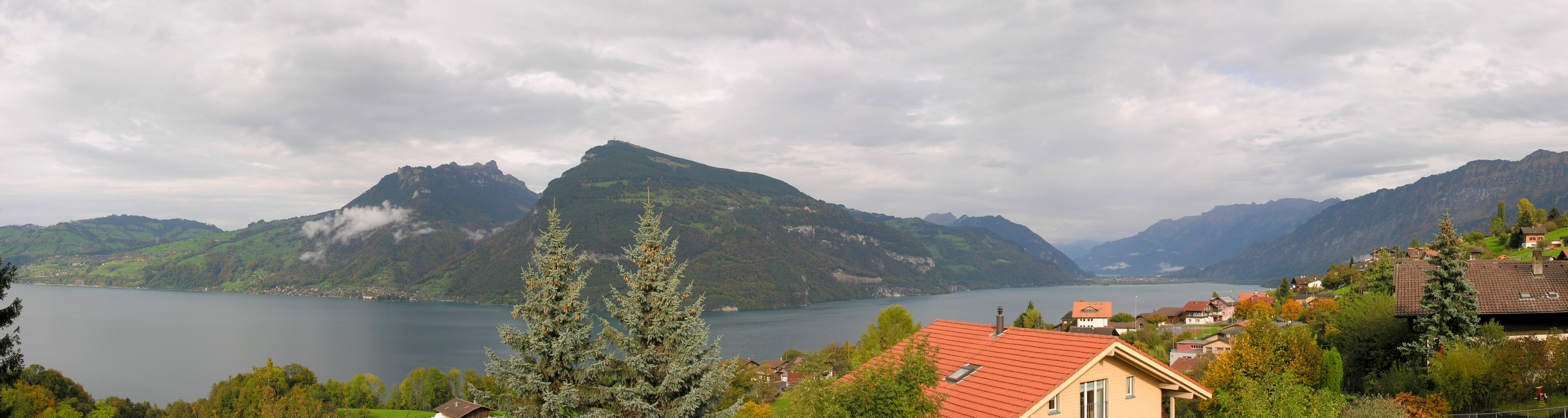
View of Lake Thun from Krattigen

Krattigen has an area of 6 km^{2} (2.32 sq mi). Of this area, 2.25 km^{2} (0.87 mi^{2}) or 37.3% is used for agricultural purposes, while 3.06 km^{2} (1.18 mi^{2}) or 50.7% is forested. Of the rest of the land, 0.64 km^{2} (0.25 mi^{2}) or 10.6% is settled (buildings or roads), 0.02 km^{2} (4.9 acres) or 0.3% is either rivers or lakes and 0.06 km^{2} (15 acres) or 1.0% is unproductive land.

Of the built up area, housing and buildings made up 5.8% and transportation infrastructure made up 1.8%. Power and water infrastructure as well as other special developed areas made up 2.5% of the area Out of the forested land, 45.9% of the total land area is heavily forested and 4.8% is covered with orchards or small clusters of trees. Of the agricultural land, 26.7% is pastures, while 1.3% is used for orchards or vine crops and 9.3% is used for alpine pastures. All the water in the municipality is in lakes.

Krattigen is located on the left shore of Lake Thun. It includes the villages of Krattigen, Stuhlegg, Örtlimatt and scattered individual farms.

On 31 December 2009 Amtsbezirk Frutigen, the municipality's former district, was dissolved. On the following day, 1 January 2010, it joined the newly created Verwaltungskreis Frutigen-Niedersimmental.

== Coat of arms ==
The blazon of the municipal coat of arms is Or on a Bend Sable three Bezants.

== Demographics ==
Krattigen has a population (as of December 2020) of 1,130. As of 2010, 5.5% of the population are resident foreign nationals. Over the last 10 years (2000-2010) the population has changed at a rate of 14.8%. Migration accounted for 16.9%, while births and deaths accounted for -8.7%.

Most of the population (as of 2000) speaks German (838 or 95.0%) as their first language, French is the second most common (16 or 1.8%) and Serbo-Croatian is the third (8 or 0.9%). There are 3 people who speak Italian.

As of 2008, the population was 48.5% male and 51.5% female. The population was made up of 446 Swiss men (45.6% of the population) and 28 (2.9%) non-Swiss men. There were 478 Swiss women (48.9%) and 26 (2.7%) non-Swiss women. Of the population in the municipality, 246 or about 27.9% were born in Krattigen and lived there in 2000. There were 373 or 42.3% who were born in the same canton, while 146 or 16.6% were born somewhere else in Switzerland, and 86 or 9.8% were born outside of Switzerland.

As of 2010, children and teenagers (0–19 years old) make up 17.1% of the population, while adults (20–64 years old) make up 54.5% and seniors (over 64 years old) make up 28.4%.

As of 2000, there were 313 people who were single and never married in the municipality. There were 446 married individuals, 90 widows or widowers and 33 individuals who are divorced.

As of 2000, there were 115 households that consist of only one person and 25 households with five or more people. In 2000, a total of 347 apartments (65.6% of the total) were permanently occupied, while 135 apartments (25.5%) were seasonally occupied and 47 apartments (8.9%) were empty. As of 2010, the construction rate of new housing units was 6.1 new units per 1000 residents. The vacancy rate for the municipality, in 2011, was 0.16%.

The historical population is given in the following chart:

== Politics ==
In the 2011 federal election the most popular party was the Conservative Democratic Party (BDP) which received 33.3% of the vote. The next three most popular parties were the Swiss People's Party (SVP) (30.8%), the Social Democratic Party (SP) (11.2%) and the Green Party (6.5%). In the federal election, a total of 442 votes were cast, and the voter turnout was 55.4%.

== Economy ==
As of 2011, Krattigen had an unemployment rate of 1.95%. As of 2008, there were a total of 246 people employed in the municipality. Of these, there were 37 people employed in the primary economic sector and about 14 businesses involved in this sector. 30 people were employed in the secondary sector and there were 9 businesses in this sector. 179 people were employed in the tertiary sector, with 19 businesses in this sector. There were 396 residents of the municipality who were employed in some capacity, of which females made up 41.7% of the workforce.

In 2008 there were a total of 180 full-time equivalent jobs. The number of jobs in the primary sector was 22, of which 18 were in agriculture and 4 were in forestry or lumber production. The number of jobs in the secondary sector was 26 of which 17 or (65.4%) were in manufacturing and 9 (34.6%) were in construction. The number of jobs in the tertiary sector was 132. In the tertiary sector; 5 or 3.8% were in wholesale or retail sales or the repair of motor vehicles, 52 or 39.4% were in a hotel or restaurant, 20 or 15.2% were in the information industry, 5 or 3.8% were technical professionals or scientists, 5 or 3.8% were in education and 37 or 28.0% were in health care.

In 2000, there were 113 workers who commuted into the municipality and 257 workers who commuted away. The municipality is a net exporter of workers, with about 2.3 workers leaving the municipality for every one entering. Of the working population, 14.9% used public transportation to get to work, and 53.3% used a private car.

== Religion ==
From the 2000 census, 76 or 8.6% were Roman Catholic, while 605 or 68.6% belonged to the Swiss Reformed Church. Of the rest of the population, there were 15 members of an Orthodox church (or about 1.70% of the population), and there were 163 individuals (or about 18.48% of the population) who belonged to another Christian church. There were 6 individuals (or about 0.68% of the population) who were Jewish, and 6 (or about 0.68% of the population) who were Islamic. 62 (or about 7.03% of the population) belonged to no church, are agnostic or atheist, and 30 individuals (or about 3.40% of the population) did not answer the question.

== Education ==
In Krattigen about 387 or (43.9%) of the population have completed non-mandatory upper secondary education, and 92 or (10.4%) have completed additional higher education (either university or a Fachhochschule). Of the 92 who completed tertiary schooling, 64.1% were Swiss men, 23.9% were Swiss women, 7.6% were non-Swiss men.

The Canton of Bern school system provides one year of non-obligatory Kindergarten, followed by six years of Primary school. This is followed by three years of obligatory lower Secondary school where the students are separated according to ability and aptitude. Following the lower Secondary students may attend additional schooling or they may enter an apprenticeship.

During the 2010-11 school year, there were a total of 64 students attending classes in Krattigen. There was one kindergarten class with a total of 15 students in the municipality. Of the kindergarten students, and 13.3% have a different mother language than the classroom language. The municipality had 3 primary classes and 49 students. Of the primary students, 2.0% were permanent or temporary residents of Switzerland (not citizens) and 4.1% have a different mother language than the classroom language.

As of 2000, there were 2 students in Krattigen who came from another municipality, while 47 residents attended schools outside the municipality.
