= Wätterlatte =

Mountain of the Bernese Alps

- Location within Switzerland

Highest point
- Elevation: 2,007 m (6,585 ft)
- Prominence: 208 m (682 ft)
- Coordinates: 46°36′27.8″N 7°44′36.8″E

Geography
- Location: Bern, Switzerland
- Parent range: Bernese Alps

The Wätterlatte is a mountain of the Bernese Alps, located east of Reichenbach im Kandertal in the Bernese Oberland. It lies on the range west of the Schwalmere, that separates the Suldtal from the Kiental.
