= Reichenbach im Kandertal railway station =

Railway station in Reichenbach im Kandertal, Switzerland

Reichenbach im Kandertal
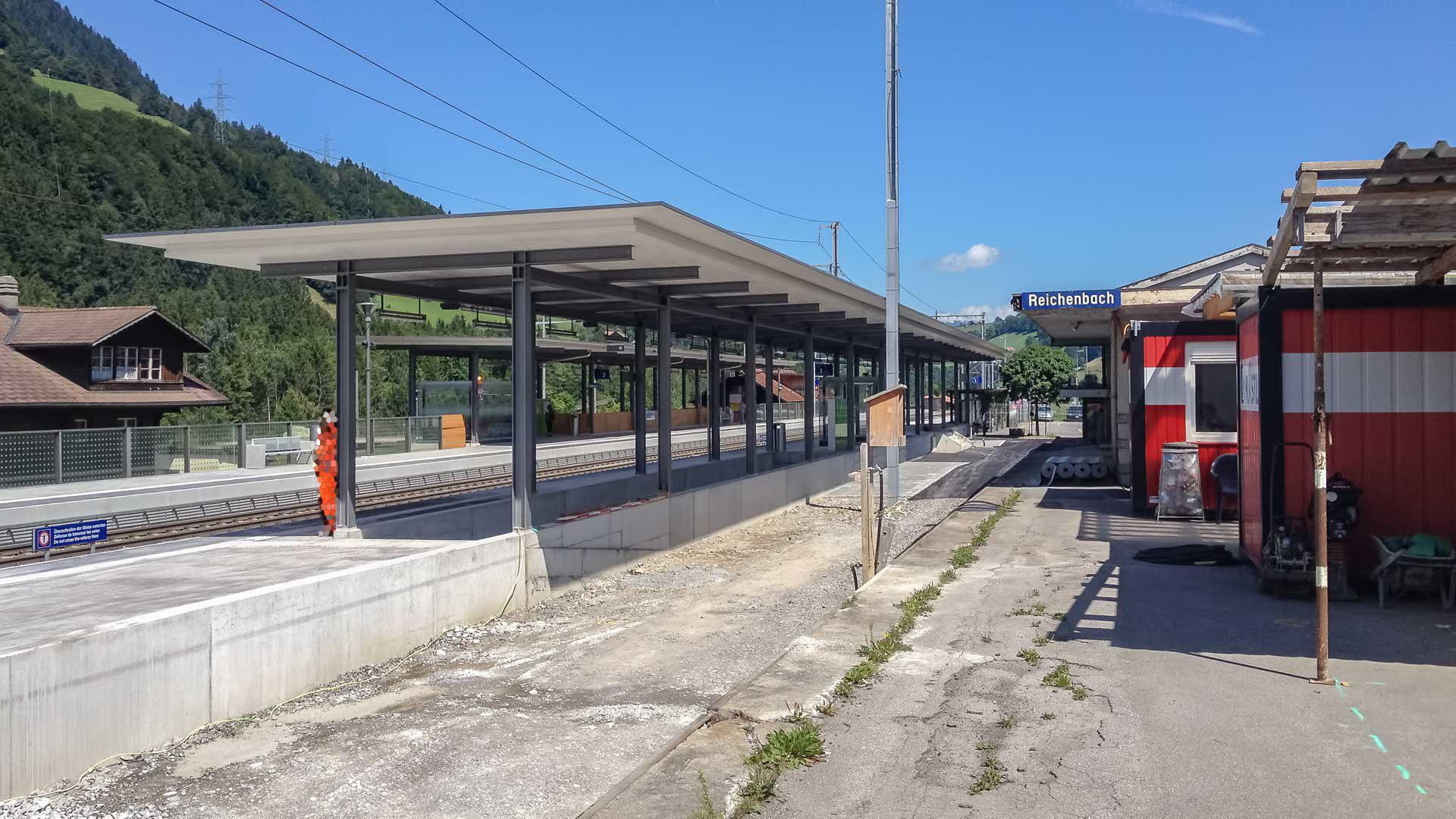
- The station in 2017

General information
- Location: Bahnhofstrasse; Reichenbach im Kandertal; Switzerland
- Coordinates: 46°37′30″N 7°41′27″E
- Elevation: 706 m (2,316 ft)
- Owner: BLS AG
- Line: Lötschberg line
- Distance: 8.3 km (5.2 mi) from Spiez
- Platforms: 2 side platforms
- Tracks: 2
- Train operators: BLS AG
- Connections: PostAuto AG bus services

Construction
- Parking: Yes (35 spaces)
- Accessible: Yes

Other information
- Station code: 8507480 (REIK)
- Fare zone: 830 (Libero)

Passengers
- 2023: 610 per weekday (BLS)

Services
| Preceding station | BLS | Following station |
|---|---|---|
| Mülenen towards Bern | RE1 | Frutigen towards Brig or Domodossola |
| Mülenen towards Biel/Bienne | RE11 Weekends only | Frutigen towards Brig |
| Mülenen towards Spiez | R12 | Frutigen Terminus |
Location

Reichenbach im Kandertal is a railway station in the municipality of Reichenbach im Kandertal in the Swiss canton of Bern. The station is located on the Lötschberg line of the BLS AG, and is adjacent to the village of Reichenbach.

== Services ==
As of the December 2024 timetable change, the following services stop at Reichenbach im Kandertal:

- RegioExpress:
  - hourly service to Bern and Brig, with most trains continuing from Brig to Domodossola.
  - daily service on weekends during the high season to Biel/Bienne and Brig.
- Regio: rush hour service to Spiez and Frutigen.

The station is also served by PostAuto bus services up the valley of the Kander river to Frutigen, and up the valley of the Chiene river to Kiental and Griesalp.
