= Ärmighorn =

Mountain in Switzerland

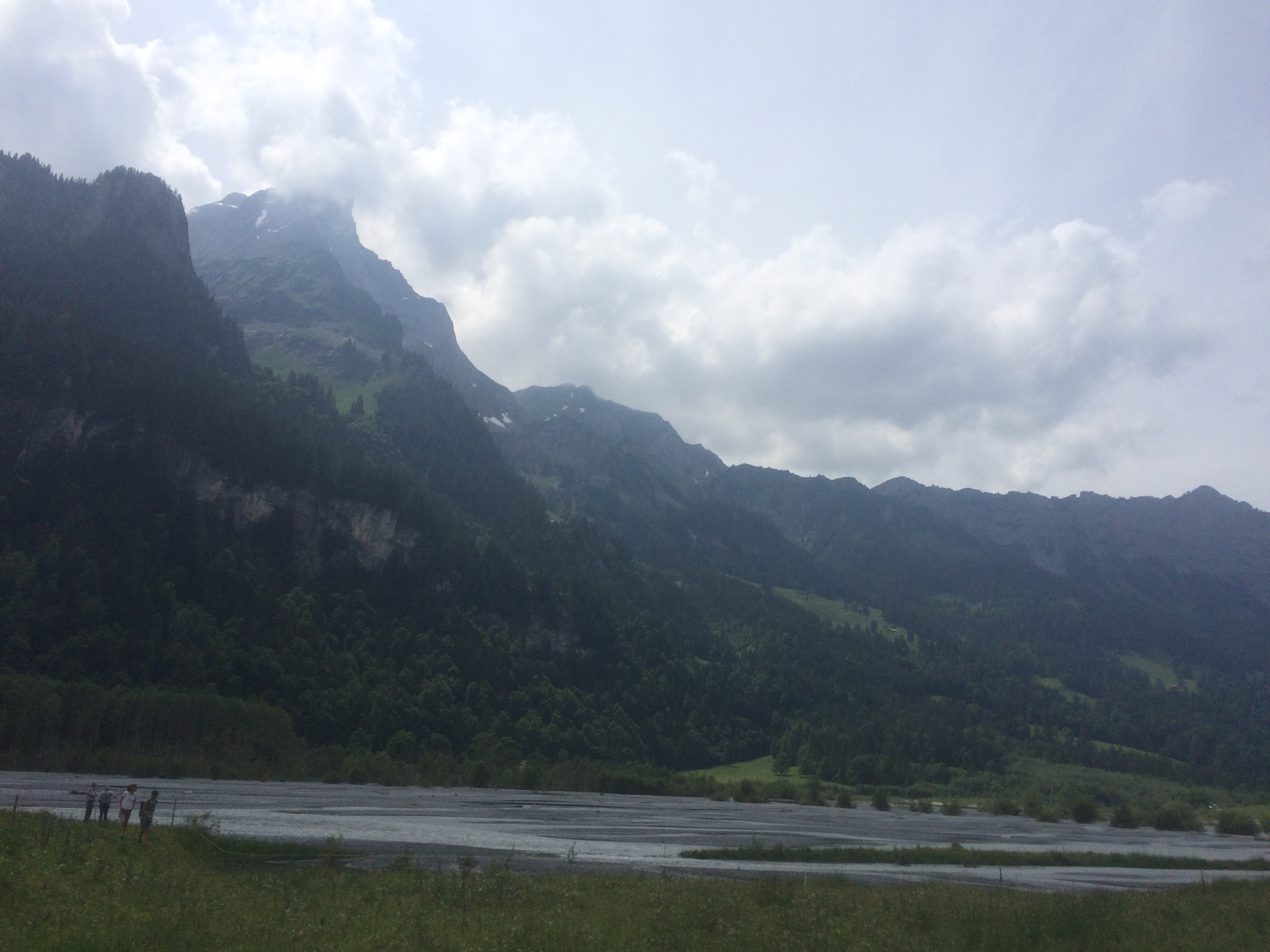
- Armighorn on left under the clouds.

Highest point
- Elevation: 2,742 m (8,996 ft)
- Prominence: 332 m (1,089 ft)
- Listing: Alpine mountains 2500-2999 m
- Coordinates: 46°32′30.1″N 7°42′49.6″E

Geography
- Location within Switzerland
- Location: Bern, Switzerland
- Parent range: Bernese Alps

The Ärmighorn (also spelled Ärmighore) is a mountain of the Bernese Alps, located east of Kandergrund in the Bernese Oberland. It lies north of the Dündenhorn, on the range between the Kandertal and the Kiental.
