= Mülenen =

Village in the canton of Bern, Switzerland

Coordinates: 46.638506°N 7.690773°E

Mülenen is a village in the Frutigen-Niedersimmental administrative district of the Swiss canton of Bern. The village is divided between the municipalities of Reichenbach im Kandertal and Aeschi bei Spiez.

Mülenen station, on the Lötschberg railway line, and the lower station of the Niesenbahn funicular, are both in the village.

Mülenen Castle and the Letzi Mülenen wall are a ruined medieval fortification and heritage site of national significance located in the village.
