= Hundshorn =

Mountain of the Bernese Alps

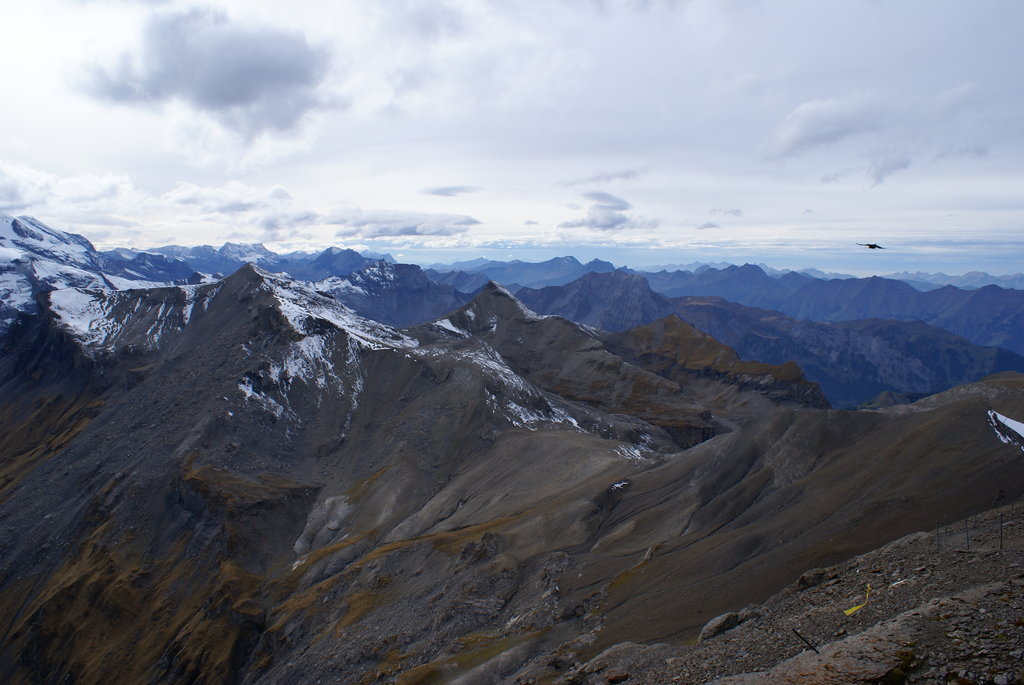
- The Hundshorn (centre left) from the Schilthorn

Highest point
- Elevation: 2,929 m (9,610 ft)
- Prominence: 284 m (932 ft)
- Parent peak: Schilthorn
- Coordinates: 46°32′34″N 07°48′22.9″E

Geography
- Location within Switzerland
- Location: Bern, Switzerland
- Parent range: Bernese Alps

The Hundshorn is a mountain of the Bernese Alps, located between the valleys of Kiental and Lauterbrunnen, in the Bernese Oberland. It lies just north of the Sefinenfurgge Pass and near the Schilthorn.
