= Frutigen railway station =

Railway station in Frutigen, Switzerland

Frutigen
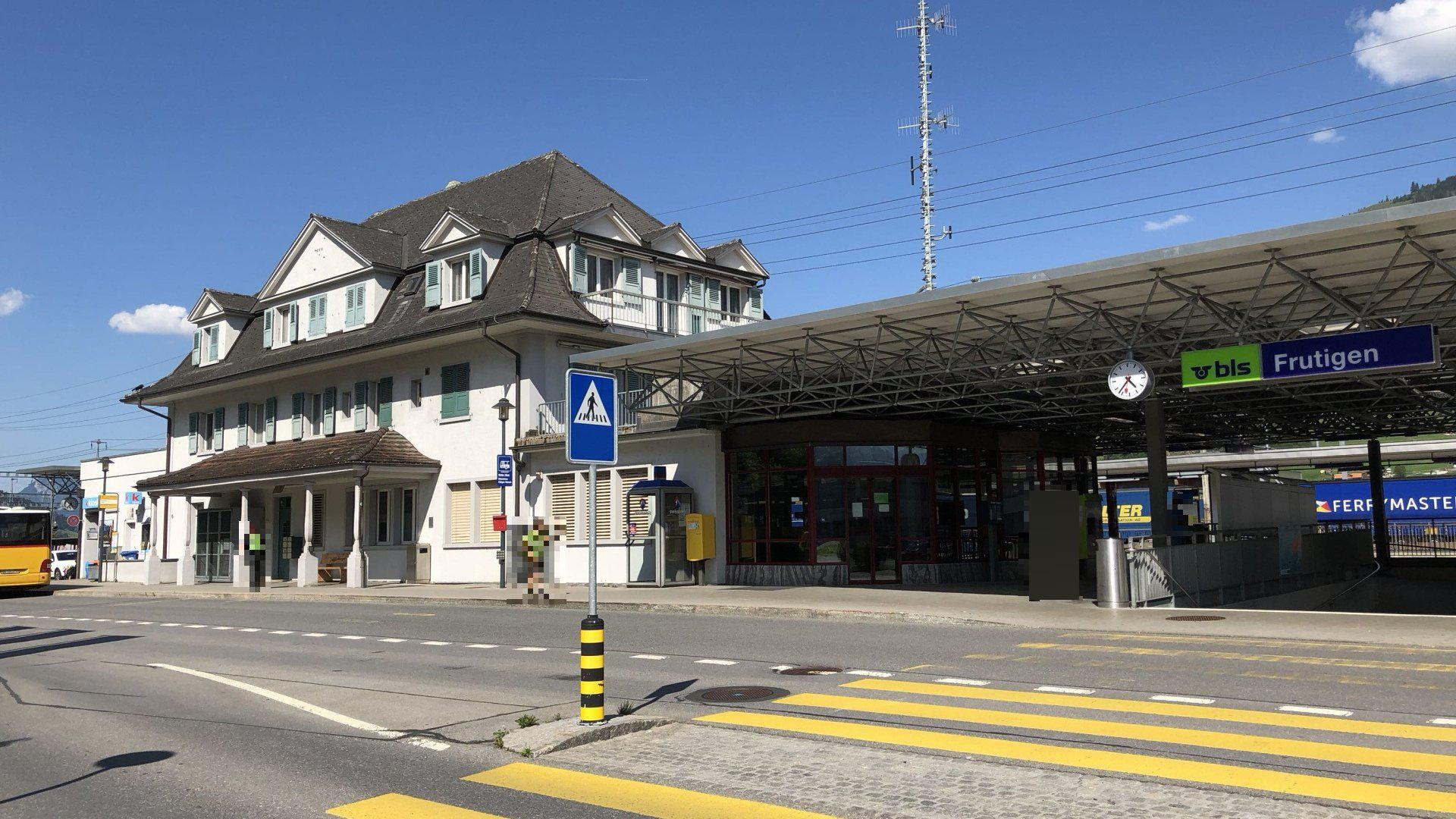
- The station building in 2018

General information
- Location: Bahnhofstrasse; Frutigen; Switzerland
- Coordinates: 46°35′20″N 7°39′07″E
- Elevation: 779 m (2,556 ft)
- Owner: BLS AG
- Line: Lötschberg line
- Distance: 13.5 km (8.4 mi) from Spiez
- Platforms: 3: 1 side platform; 1 island platform
- Tracks: 3
- Train operators: BLS AG; Swiss Federal Railways
- Connections: PostAuto AG bus service; Automobilverkehr Frutigen-Adelboden bus services

Construction
- Parking: Yes (74 spaces)
- Accessible: Yes

Other information
- Station code: 8507478 (FR)
- Fare zone: 831 (Libero)

Passengers
- 2023: 2'600 per weekday (BLS, SBB)

Services
Preceding station	BLS	Following station
Reichenbach im Kandertal towards Bern	RE1	Kandersteg towards Brig or Domodossola
Reichenbach im Kandertal towards Biel/Bienne	RE11 Weekends only	Kandersteg towards Brig
Reichenbach im Kandertal towards Spiez	R12	Terminus
Location

Frutigen is a railway station in the Swiss canton of Bern and municipality of Frutigen. The station is located on the Lötschberg line of the BLS AG, and is the junction point where the routes via the older Lötschberg tunnel and the more recent Lötschberg base tunnel diverge.

== Services ==
As of the December 2024 timetable change, the following services stop at Frutigen:

- RegioExpress:
  - hourly service to Bern and Brig, with most trains continuing from Brig to Domodossola.
  - daily service on weekends during the high season to Biel/Bienne and Brig.
- Regio: rush hour service to Spiez.

The station is also served by PostAuto bus service to Wengi, Reudlen and Reichenbach im Kandertal, Automobilverkehr Frutigen-Adelboden bus service to Kandergrund, Blausee, Mitholz and Kandersteg, and to Achseten and Adelboden.

The northern portal of the Lötschberg base tunnel lies immediately to the south of the station. Trains passing through the station are able to use either Lötschberg route, thanks to a grade-separated junction between the station and tunnel mouth. This junction also allows trains on the base tunnel route to bypass Frutigen station, using the Engstlige tunnel.

Whilst passenger trains on the base tunnel route can serve Frutigen station, only a few trains per day do so, with most stopping services operating via the old line.
