= Sefinenfurgge Pass =

Mountain pass in the Swiss canton of Bern

Sefinafurgga
- Germanized: Sefinenfurgge
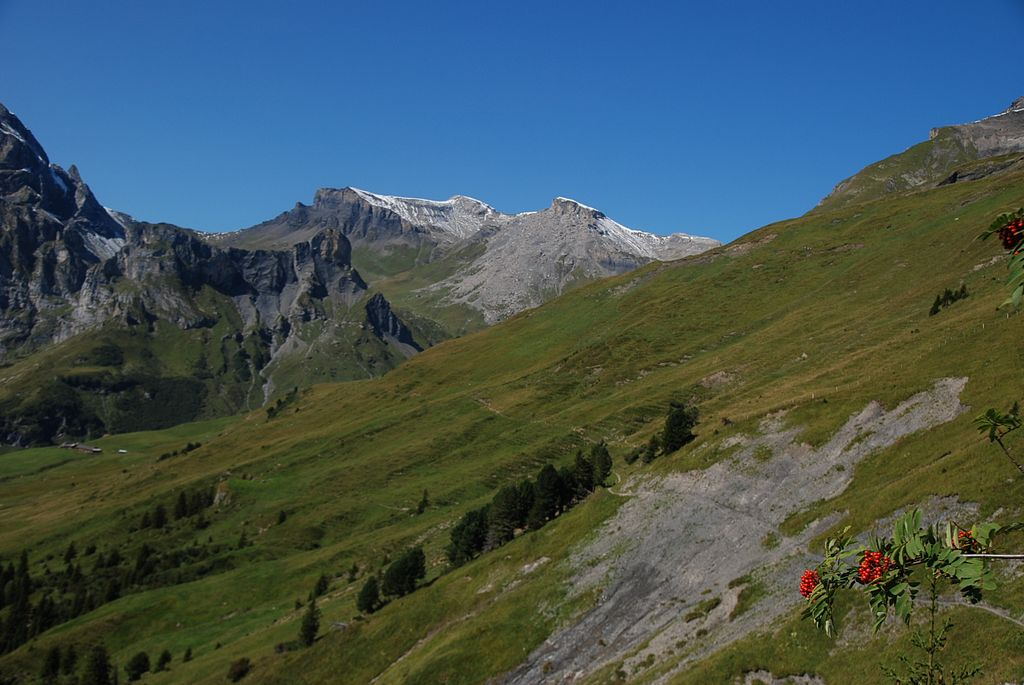
- The path to the Sefinenfurgge

- Location within Switzerland
- Elevation: 2,612 metres (8,570 ft)
- Traversed by: Track or trail

Third Approach
- Location: Canton of Bern
- Range: Bernese Alps
- Coordinates: 46°31′54″N 07°48′47″E

The Sefinafurgga (Swiss German, Germanized: Sefinenfurgge) is a mountain pass of the Bernese Alps. The pass crosses the col between the peaks of Hundshore and Bütlasse, at an elevation of 2,612 m (8,570 ft).

The pass is traversed by a hiking track, which connects the village of Lauterbrunnen, at an elevation of 795 m (2,608 ft), and the Alpine hamlet of Griesalp, at an elevation of 1,408 m (4,619 ft) in the upper Kiental south of Reichenbach im Kandertal at the entrance of the Kiental. The track forms part of the Alpine Pass Route, a long-distance hiking trail across Switzerland between Sargans and Montreux.

== See also ==
- List of mountain passes in Switzerland
