= Drunengalm =

Mountain of the Bernese Alps

- Drunegalm
- Location within Switzerland

Highest point
- Elevation: 2,408 m (7,900 ft)
- Prominence: 286 m (938 ft)
- Parent peak: Hohniesen
- Coordinates: 46°37′33″N 7°37′9″E

Geography
- Location: Bern, Switzerland
- Parent range: Bernese Alps

The Drunengalm (or Drunegalm) is a mountain of the Bernese Alps, located between Diemtigen and Reichenbach im Kandertal in the Bernese Oberland.
