= Dreispitz =

Mountain of the Bernese Alps

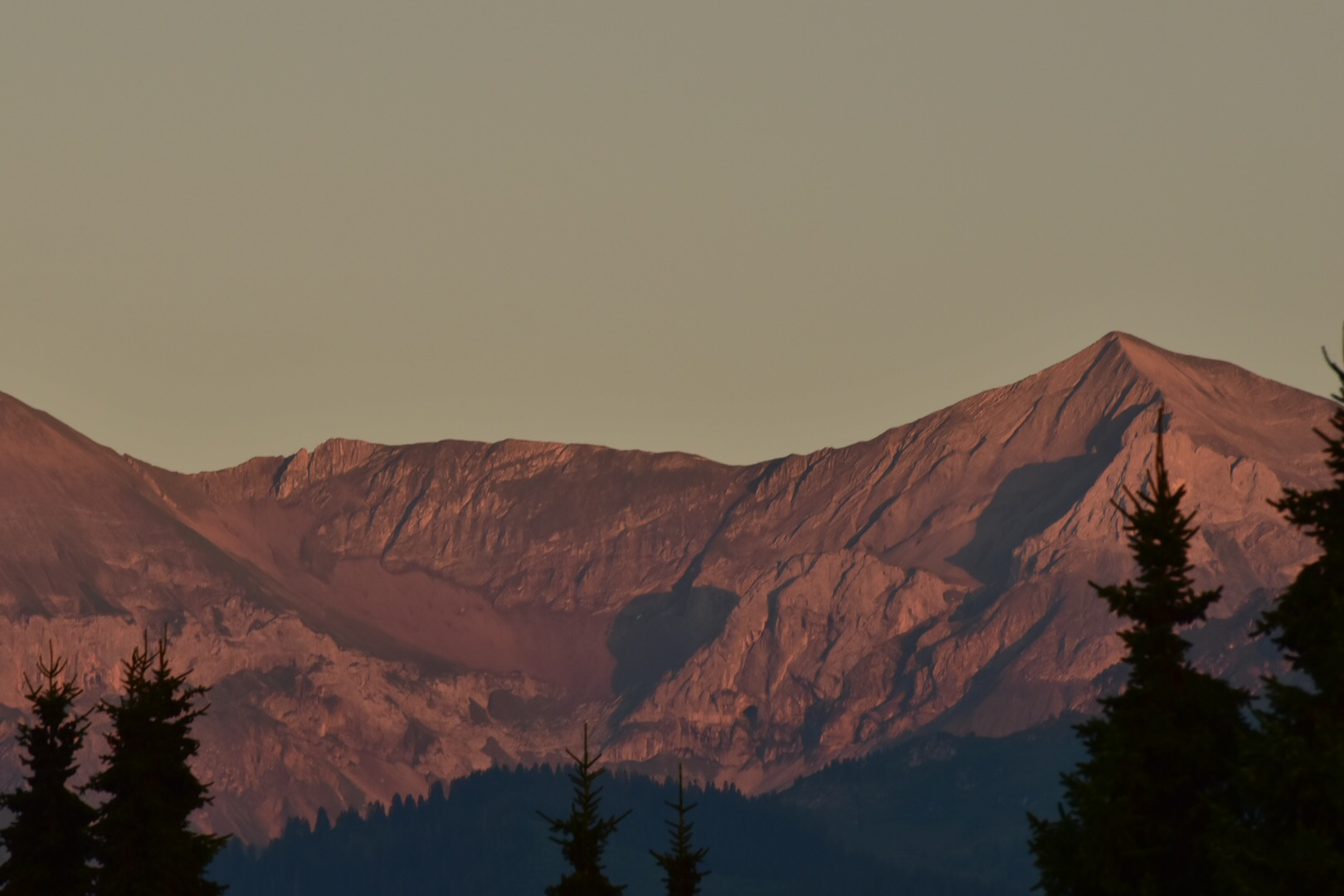

Highest point
- Elevation: 2,520 m (8,270 ft)
- Prominence: 526 m (1,726 ft)
- Parent peak: Finsteraarhorn
- Coordinates: 46°35′33.9″N 7°45′34.5″E

Geography
- Location within Switzerland
- Location: Bern, Switzerland
- Parent range: Bernese Alps

The Dreispitz is a mountain of the Bernese Alps, overlooking Kiental in the Bernese Oberland. The summit can be reached by a trail from the Renggpass.
