= Frutigen-Niedersimmental (administrative district) =

Coordinates: 46°04′N 7°03′E

Frutigen-Niedersimmental District Verwaltungskreis Frutigen-Niedersimmental
- District
- Country: Switzerland
- Canton: Bern
- Capital: Frutigen

Area
  - Total: 773.93 km^{2} (298.82 sq mi)

Population (2020)
  - Total: 40,607
  - Density: 52.469/km^{2} (135.89/sq mi)
- Time zone: UTC+1 (CET)
  - Summer (DST): UTC+2 (CEST)
- Municipalities: 13

Frutigen-Niedersimmental District in the Canton of Bern was created on 1 January 2010. It is part of the Oberland administrative region. It contains 13 municipalities with an area of 773.93 km^{2} (298.82 sq mi) and a population (as of December 2008) of 38,871.

Arms	Name	Population (31 December 2020)	Area in km^{2}
Adelboden	Adelboden	3,343	88.20
Aeschi bei Spiez	Aeschi bei Spiez	2,256	30.88
Därstetten	Därstetten	862	32.80
Diemtigen	Diemtigen	2,253	129.94
Erlenbach im Simmental	Erlenbach im Simmental	1,724	36.73
Frutigen	Frutigen	6,967	71.74
Kandergrund	Kandergrund	807	32.07
Kandersteg	Kandersteg	1,288	134.58
Krattigen	Krattigen	1,130	6.11
Oberwil im Simmental	Oberwil im Simmental	804	46.09
Reichenbach im Kandertal	Reichenbach im Kandertal	3,638	125.70
Spiez	Spiez	12,926	16.75
Wimmis	Wimmis	2,609	22.34
	Total (13)	40,607	773.93
