= Niesenbahn =

Funicular railway in the canton of Bern

Coordinates: 46.639356°N 7.69021°E

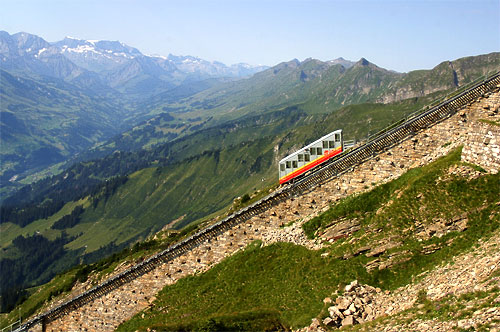

Overview
- Status: in operation
- Owner: Niesenbahn AG (since 2011); Niesen-Bahn-Gesellschaft (‥–2011, name change)
- Locale: Canton of Bern; Switzerland
- Termini: "Mülenen (Niesenbahn)"; "Niesen Kulm"
- Stations: 3 (including "Schwandegg")
- Website: niesen.ch

Service
- Type: funicular with 2 sections
- Route number: 2405
- Operator(s): Niesenbahn AG
- Rolling stock: 4 (2 per section, for 60 passengers each)

History
- Opened: 15 July 1910 (115 years ago)

Technical
- Line length: 3.5 km (2.2 mi)
- Number of tracks: 1 (each section with a passing loop)
- Track gauge: 1,000 mm (3 ft 3 3/8 in)
- Electrification: from opening
- Highest elevation: 2,336 m (7,664 ft)
- Maximum incline: 68%

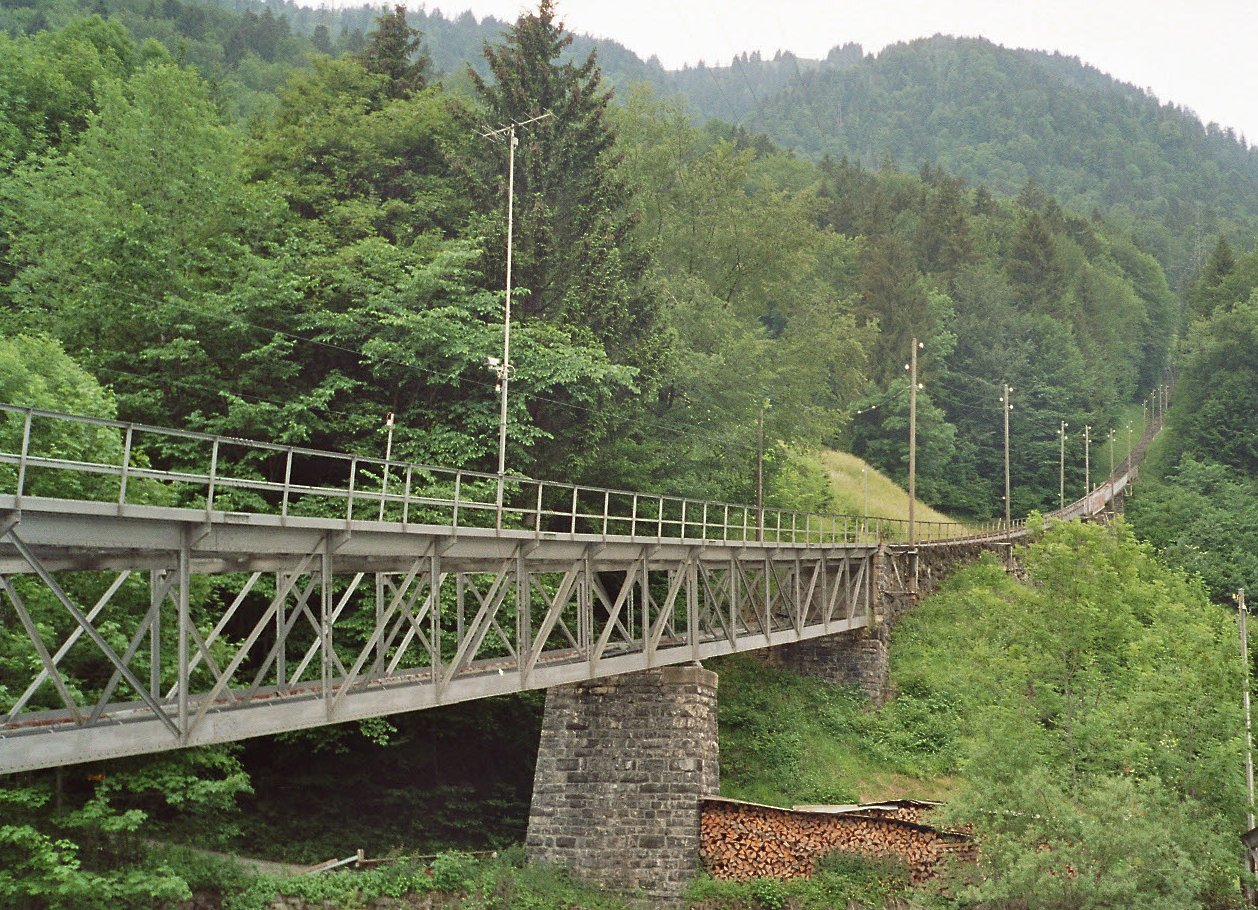
The funicular above Mülenen station

The Niesenbahn is a funicular railway above Lake Thun in the canton of Bern, Switzerland. It links a lower terminus, in the village of Mülenen at 693 m (2,274 ft) and adjacent to Mülenen station on the Lötschberg railway line, with an upper terminus at 2,336 m (7,664 ft) near the summit of Niesen, a viewpoint above the lake and Bernese Oberland. The funicular is divided into two portions with a total length of 3.5 kilometres (2.2 mi), an elevation difference of 1,643 metres (5,390 ft), and a maximum slope of 68%.

Construction of the line commenced in 1906, and it opened in 1910.

The service stairway for the Niesenbahn funicular is listed by Guinness Book of Records as the longest stairway, with 11,674 steps and a height of 1,669 m (5,476 ft). The stairs are usually employee-only, but there is a public run called "Niesenlauf" once a year.

The line is owned and operated by the Niesenbahn AG.

== Operation ==
The line operates from late April to mid November, with cars operating every 30 minutes between 08:00 and 17:00. A 15-minute interval service is provided at busy periods, and evening services are operated on some days.

The line comprises two sections, with an interchange station at Schwandegg, and has the following parameters:

Feature	Lower section	Upper section
Number of cars	2	2
Number of stops	2	2
Configuration	Single track with passing loop	Single track with passing loop
Track length	2,112 m (6,929 ft)	1,388 m (4,554 ft)
Rise	975 m (3,199 ft)	667 m (2,188 ft)
Maximum gradient	66%	68%
Track gauge	1,000 mm (3 ft 3 3/8 in) metre gauge	1,000 mm (3 ft 3 3/8 in) metre gauge
Speed	2.9 m/s (9.5 ft/s)	2.0 m/s (6.6 ft/s)
Journey time	13 mins	12.5 mins
Capacity	60 passengers per car; 120 persons in each direction per hour	60 passengers per car; 120 persons in each direction per hour

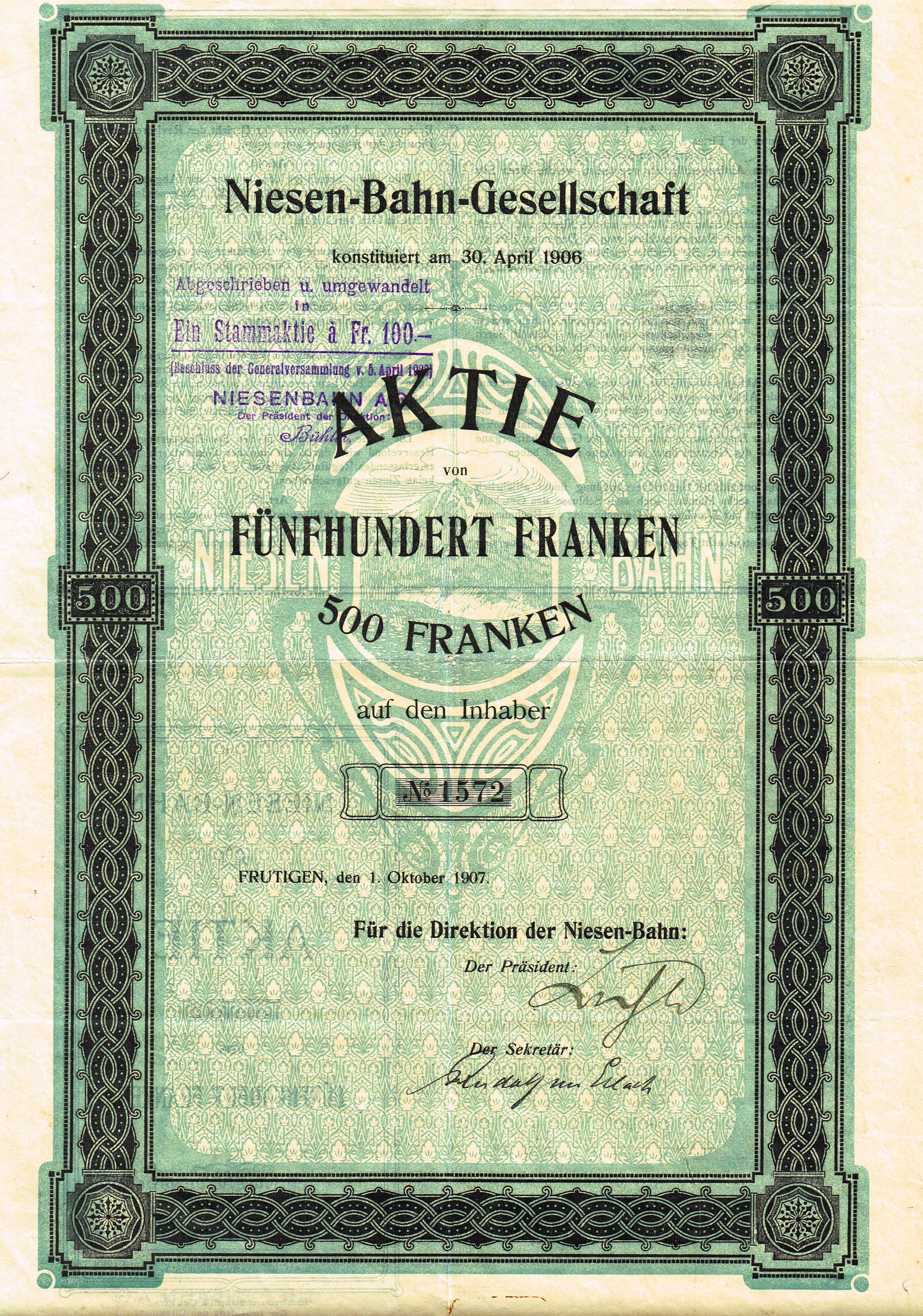
Share of the Niesen-Bahn-Gesellschaft, issued 1. October 1907
