= Niesen =

Mountain peak in the Swiss Alps

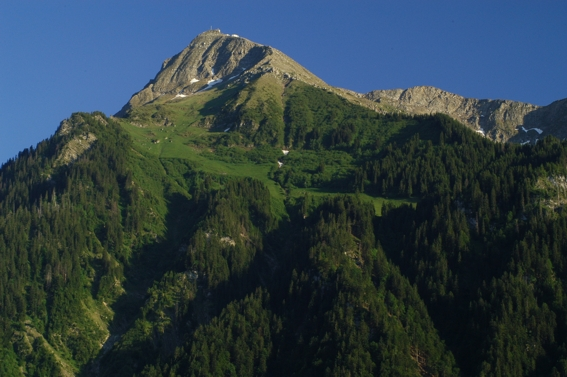
- The Niesen from Wimmis

Highest point
- Elevation: 2,362 m (7,749 ft)
- Prominence: 407 m (1,335 ft)
- Parent peak: Albristhorn
- Isolation: 2.3 km (1.4 mi)
- Coordinates: 46°38′46″N 7°39′09″E

Geography
- Location within Switzerland
- Location: Canton of Bern, Switzerland
- Parent range: Bernese Alps

Climbing
- Easiest route: Niesenbahn

The Niesen is a mountain peak of the Bernese Alps in the Canton of Bern, Switzerland. The summit of the mountain is 2,362 metres (7,749 ft) in elevation.

It overlooks Lake Thun, in the Bernese Oberland region, and forms the northern end of a ridge that stretches north from the Albristhorn and Mannliflue, separating the Simmental and Kandertal valleys.

== Geography ==
Administratively, the summit is shared between the municipalities of Reichenbach im Kandertal to the southeast, and Wimmis to the west and north. Both municipalities are in the canton of Bern.

The summit can be reached easily by using the Niesenbahn funicular from Mülenen (near Reichenbach). The construction of the funicular was completed in 1910.

Alongside the funicular is the longest stairway in the world, with 11,674 steps. It is only open to the public once a year for a stair run event.

Originally the mountain's name was Yesen. «An Yesen» transformed to Niesen. Yesen is yellow gentian and still flowers on the Niesen to this day. Because of its shape, the Niesen is often called the Swiss Pyramid. The Niesen may have influenced some modernist paintings by Paul Klee, in which an abstracted pyramidal form is seen.

== Gallery ==
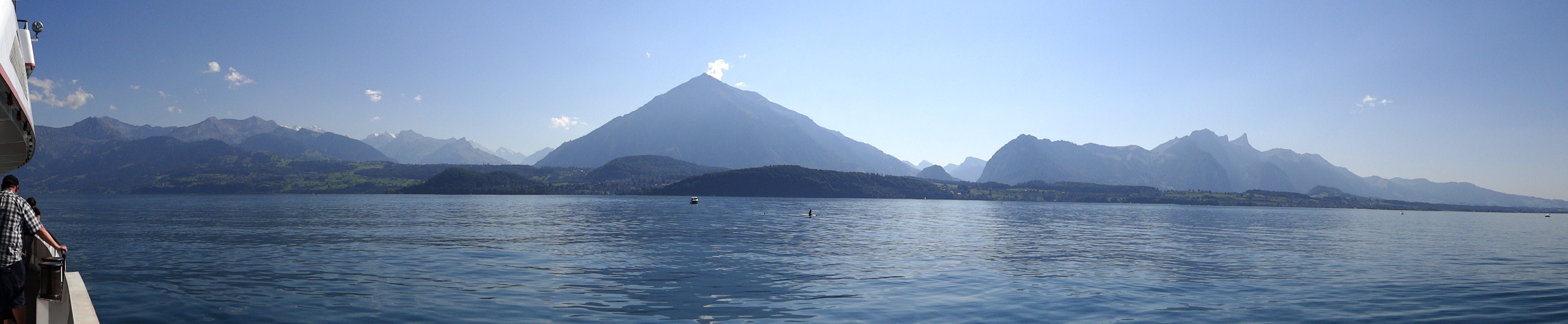
View of the pyramidal Niesen and the Bernese Alps from Lake Thun

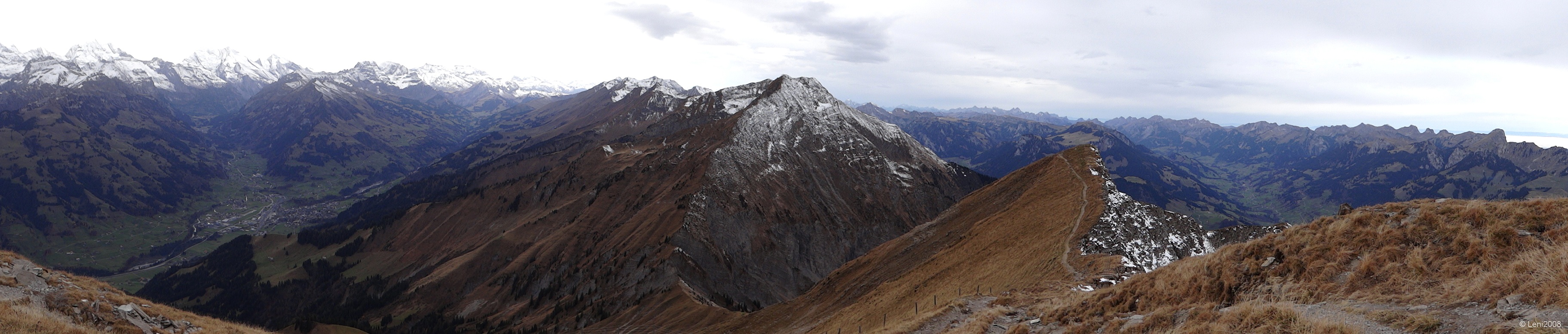
View of the Niesen from the Fromberghore, with the Kandertal, Engstligental and Simmental valleys

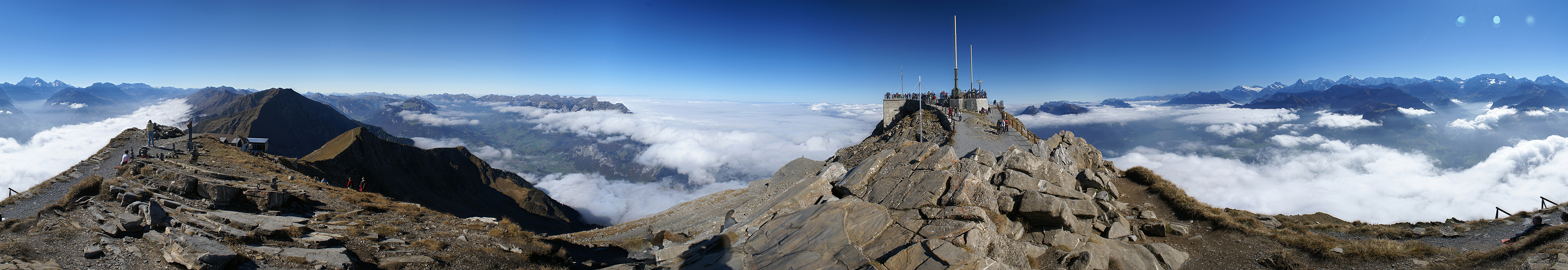
360° degree panoramic view from the Niesen's summit

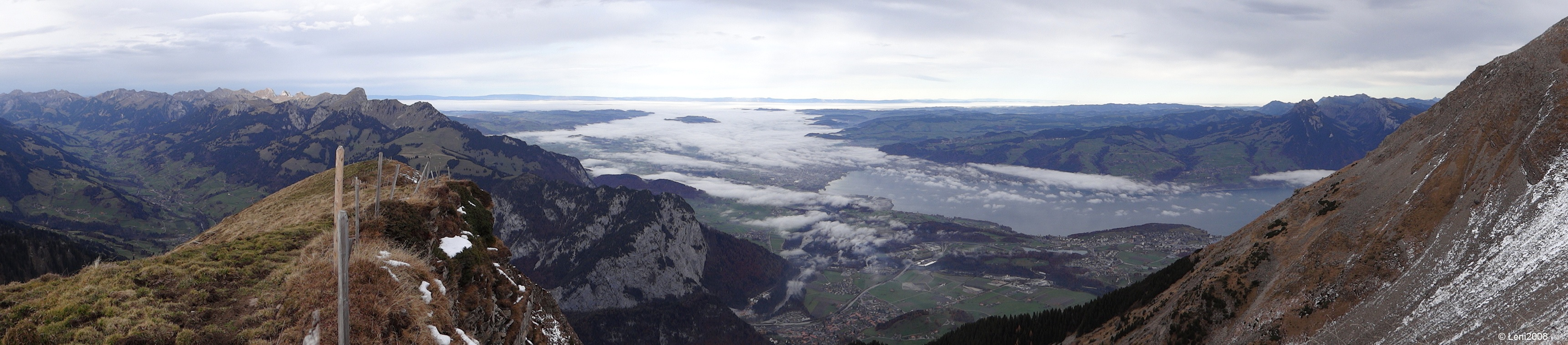
View from the Niesen's summit of the Stockhorn, Lake Thun and the Jura Mountains

== See also ==
- Bernese Alps topics
- List of mountains of Switzerland accessible by public transport
- Mountains and peaks of the Alps
- Two-thousanders of Switzerland
