= Mülenen Castle =

Ruined medieval castle in Bern, Switzerland

Mülenen Castle/Letzi Mülenen
- Letzi Mülenen
- Reichenbach im Kandertal
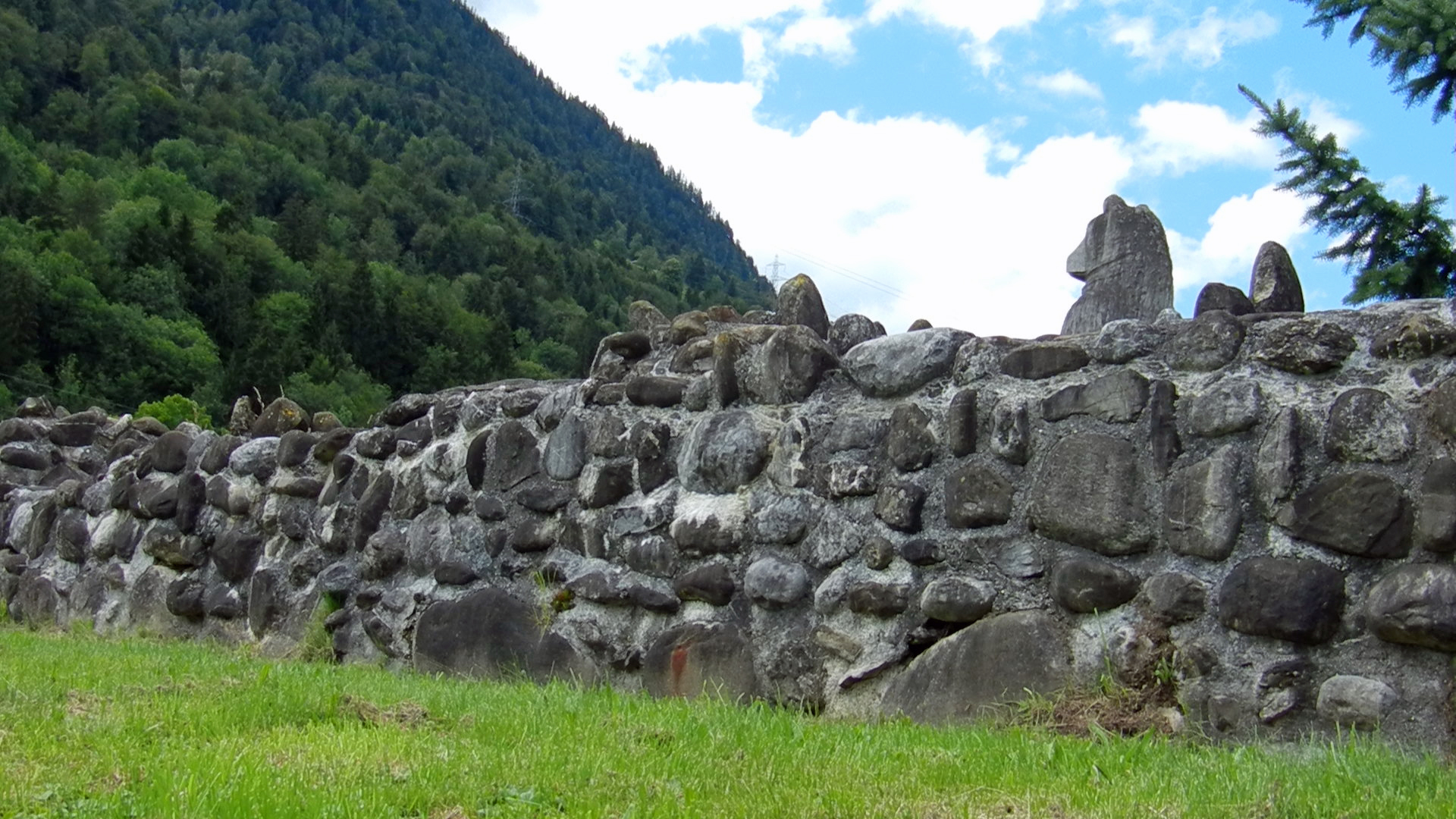
- Ruins of the Letzi Mülenen wall

Site information
- Open to the public: yes

Location
- Coordinates: 46.63776°N 7.692°E

Site history
- Built: 12th century
- Built by: Freiherr of Kien

Mülenen Castle and the attached Letzi Mülenen wall are a ruined medieval fortification in the village of Mülenen and municipality of Reichenbach im Kandertal, in the Swiss canton of Bern. The Letzi Mülenen is a Swiss heritage site of national significance.

== Name ==
Letzi comes from Middle High German and means a hindrance, obstacle, bulwark or frontier fortifications. The Letzi Mülenen was built at Mülenen to protect and control access to the alpine pass into the Canton of Valais.

== History ==
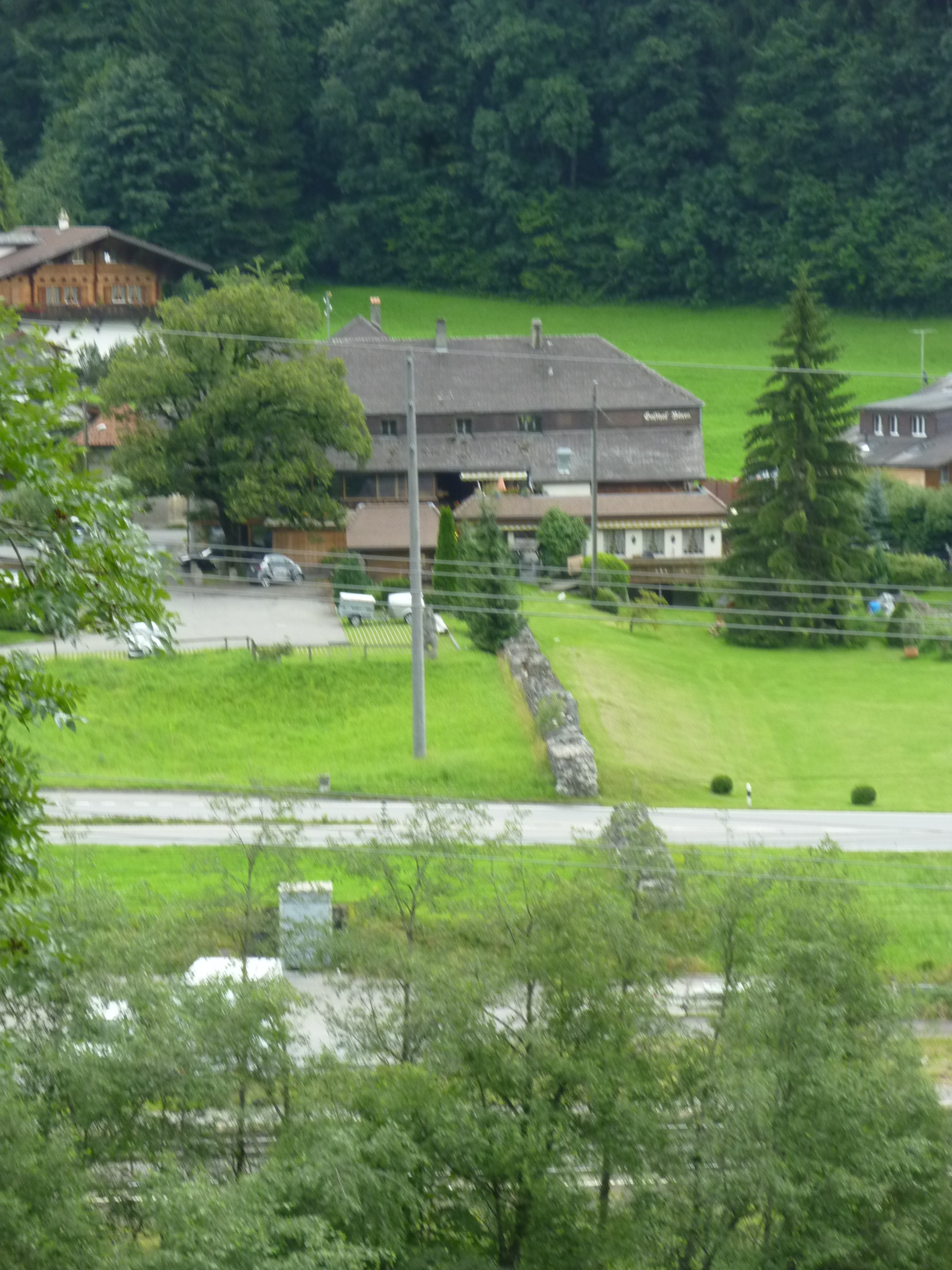
View of the Letzi Mülenen wall after it was excavated.

Mülenen Castle was the second castle of the Freiherr von Kien in Reichenbach. It was first mentioned in 1269 as Mulinon. The first Letzi or wall was built in the 12th century on the northern end of the valley. A second wall was built over the first in the 13th century. In 1331 Konrad Justinger called it stetli Mülenen which implies that a settlement had grown up around the castle and wall. However, there are no other documents that mention the settlement.

By 1290 the castle and settlement were acquired by the Freiherr von Wädenswil. It was inherited by the Lords of Turn, who were the heirs to the Wädenswil family. The Wädenswil and Turn families joined a coalition of nobles that attempted to fight against the growing power of the city of Bern. In 1294, they fought against a Bernese army at the Letzi. However, this and later attempts to fight Bern left the nobles deep in debt. They had to pawn the castle and fortifications. After passing through several owners, in 1352 Bern bought the castle and the rest of the Herrschaft of Mülenen. A Bernese castellan was appointed who managed the military and the high and low courts. However, by about 1400, the castellan moved to Frutigen and abandoned Mülenen. The castle and wall were demolished and used as a source of construction materials.

== Castle site ==
The Letzi was rediscovered in 1990 during construction of a ring road around the village of Mülenen. It was excavated in 1990 to 1996 and conserved. The first wall was probably wooden. The second, from the 13th century, was stone. The stone wall was about 1.45 meters (4.8 ft) wide and probably between 3–5 m (9.8–16.4 ft) tall, but only 1.5 m (4.9 ft) of the wall remains. The castle was located in the center of the wall and was built in four stages. It consisted of a 10 m × 19 m (33 ft × 62 ft) rectangular tower surrounded by an unwalled square courtyard which was about 24 m (79 ft) on each side.

== See also ==
- List of castles in Switzerland
