= Schwalmere =

Mountain of the Bernese Alps

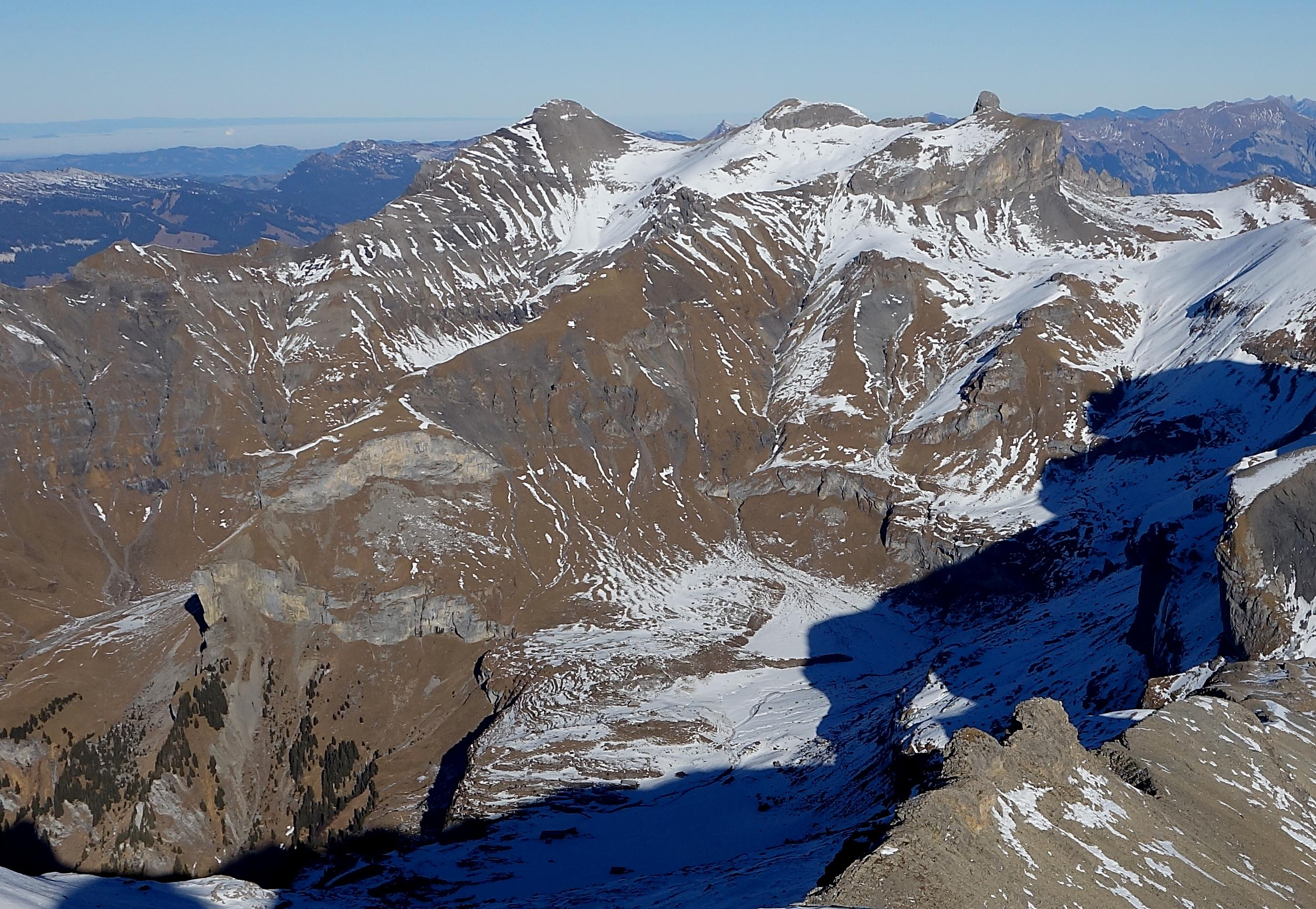
- Schwalmere from SW (from Wild Andrist), v. l. n. r. Schwalmere, Hohganthorn, Drattehorn. Below is the Alp Hohkien (snow-covered plain)

Highest point
- Elevation: 2,777 m (9,111 ft)
- Prominence: 103 m (338 ft)
- Parent peak: Drättehorn
- Coordinates: 46°35′34.5″N 7°49′0.8″E

Geography
- Location within Switzerland
- Location: Bern, Switzerland
- Parent range: Bernese Alps

The Schwalmere is a mountain of the Bernese Alps, located between Kiental and Lauterbrunnen in the Bernese Oberland. It lies on the range north of the Schilthorn.
