= Hohniesen =

Mountain in Switzerland

- Bündihorn
- Location within Switzerland

Highest point
- Elevation: 2,454 m (8,051 ft)
- Prominence: 371 m (1,217 ft)
- Parent peak: Albristhorn
- Coordinates: 46°34′38.1″N 7°34′59.5″E

Geography
- Location: Bern, Switzerland
- Parent range: Bernese Alps

The Hohniesen (also known as Bündihorn) is a mountain in the Bernese Alps, located near Frutigen in the Bernese Oberland. It lies between the Diemtigtal and the Frutigtal.
