= Aeschi bei Spiez =

- Municipality
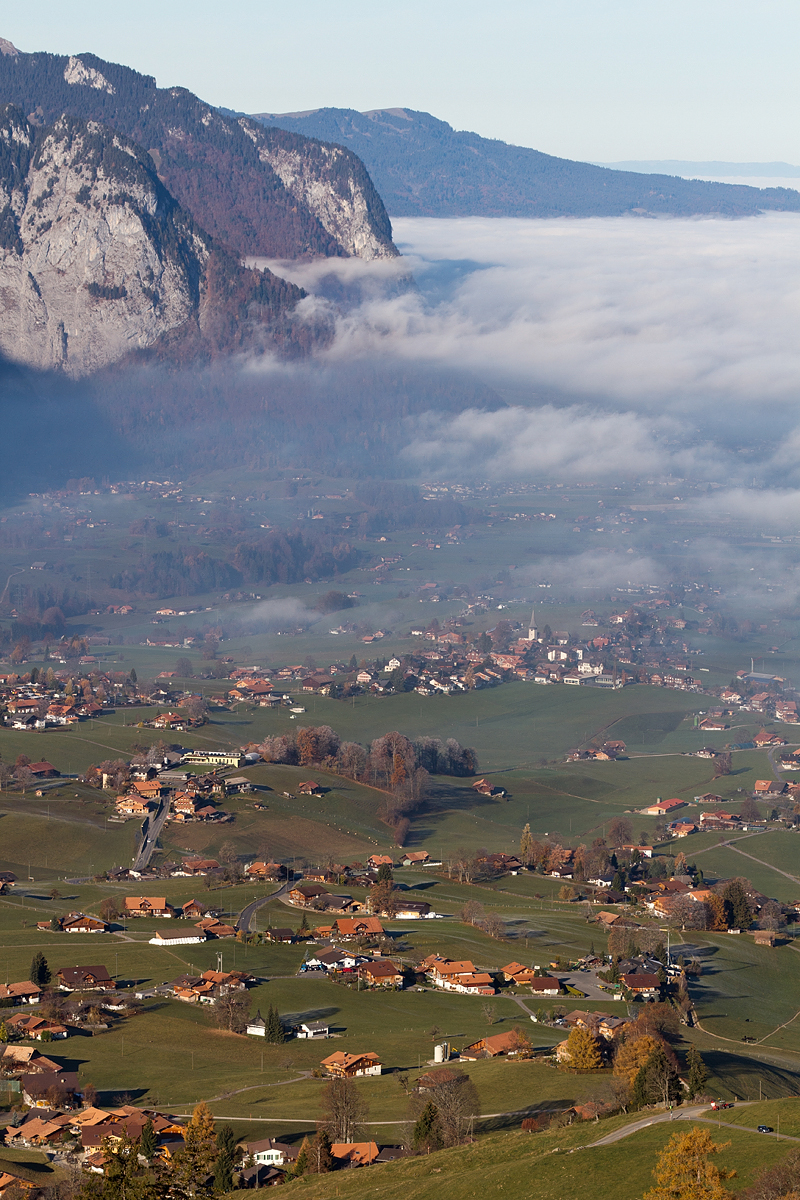
- Aeschi bei Spiez village

- Flag Coat of arms
- Location of Aeschi bei Spiez
- Location within Switzerland Location within Canton of Bern
- Coordinates: 46°39′N 7°41′E
- Country: Switzerland
- Canton: Bern
- District: Frutigen-Niedersimmental

Government
  - Executive: Gemeinderat with 7 members
  - Mayor: Gemeindepräsident(in); Christian Däpp SVP/UDC (as of 2026)

Area
  - Total: 30.9 km^{2} (11.9 sq mi)
- Elevation: 860 m (2,820 ft)
- Highest elevation: 1,400 m (4,600 ft)
- Lowest elevation: 850 m (2,790 ft)

Population (December 2020)
  - Total: 2,256
  - Density: 73.0/km^{2} (189/sq mi)
- Time zone: UTC+01:00 (CET)
  - Summer (DST): UTC+02:00 (CEST)
- Postal code: 3703
- SFOS number: 562
- ISO 3166 code: CH-BE
- Surrounded by: Krattigen, Lauterbrunnen, Leissigen, Reichenbach im Kandertal, Saxeten, Spiez, Wimmis
- Website: www.aeschi.ch

Aeschi bei Spiez is a municipality in the Frutigen-Niedersimmental administrative district in the canton of Bern in Switzerland.

== History ==
Aeschi bei Spiez is first mentioned in 1228 as Asshes. In 1269 it was mentioned as (villa) Esche..

The earliest traces of settlements in the area include scattered La Tene era graves and individual prehistoric tools. During the Middle Ages, it was part of the Herrschaft of Mülenen, under the Lords of Kien. The Herrschaft then passed through several other nobles, including the Wädenswil and Turn families. By the 13th century, Aeschi was the center of a large parish. The Romanesque parish church of St. Peter was first mentioned in 1228. The frescoes in the church were painted in the 14th century. In 1352, the city of Bern acquired the village land, while the low court rights remained with other noble families. Under Bernese rule, the village was initially part of the district of Mülenen. In the 15th and 16th centuries, it became part of Frutigen. The town charter was first documented in 1469.

In 1528, Bern forced the villagers to adopt the Protestant Reformation. In the following year, the parish was split and the village of Reichenbach became an independent parish.

During the 19th century the economy stagnated and the village population began to decrease. The rise of tourism the late 19th century allowed the population to begin to grow once again. In 1855, the Bad Heustrich medical spa opened in Aeschi. It soon grew into a well known resort and tourist destination. In 1901 the Lötschberg railroad allowed an increasing number of tourists to visit the village. A rail station opened in Mülenen in 1906. In the late 1960s the municipality experienced a building boom as the population grew and as demand for vacation homes rose. By 1990 almost two-thirds of the population worked in the services industry.

== Geography ==
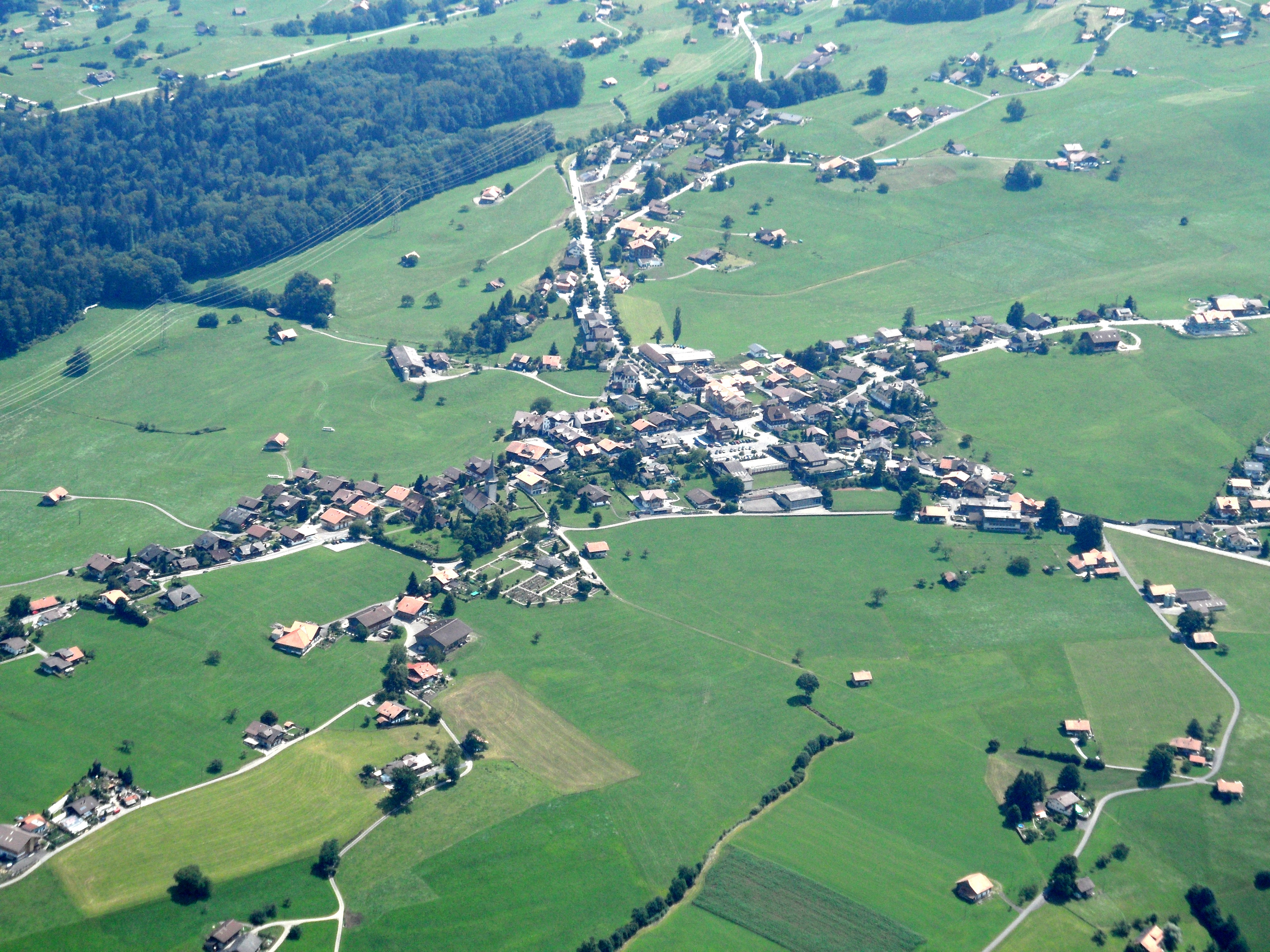
Aeschi bei Spiez

Aerial view (1956)

Aeschi bei Spiez has an area of 30.99 km^{2} (11.97 sq mi). Of this area, 14.35 km^{2} (5.54 mi^{2}) or 46.3% is used for agricultural purposes, while 8.5 km^{2} (3.3 mi^{2}) or 27.4% is forested. Of the rest of the land, 1.58 km^{2} (0.61 mi^{2}) or 5.1% is settled (buildings or roads), 0.38 km^{2} (0.15 mi^{2}) or 1.2% is either rivers or lakes and 6.11 km^{2} (2.36 mi^{2}) or 19.7% is unproductive land.

Of the built up area, housing and buildings made up 2.6% and transportation infrastructure made up 2.0%. Out of the forested land, 22.6% of the total land area is heavily forested and 2.4% is covered with orchards or small clusters of trees. Of the agricultural land, 20.6% is pastures and 25.2% is used for alpine pastures. All the water in the municipality is flowing water. Of the unproductive areas, 7.6% is unproductive vegetation and 12.1% is too rocky for vegetation.

Aeschi bei Spiez is located along a ridge between the Kander valley and Lake Thun. The municipality includes Aeschi bei Spiez and Aeschiried, Heustrich-Emdtal, Mülenen and Alpen im hinteren Suldtal. The parish church serves both Aeschi and Krattigen.

On 31 December 2009 Amtsbezirk Frutigen, the municipality's former district, was dissolved. On the following day, 1 January 2010, it joined the newly created Verwaltungskreis Frutigen-Niedersimmental.

== Coat of arms ==
The blazon of the municipal coat of arms is Argent a Bear paw Sable issuant from chief sinister.

== Demographics ==
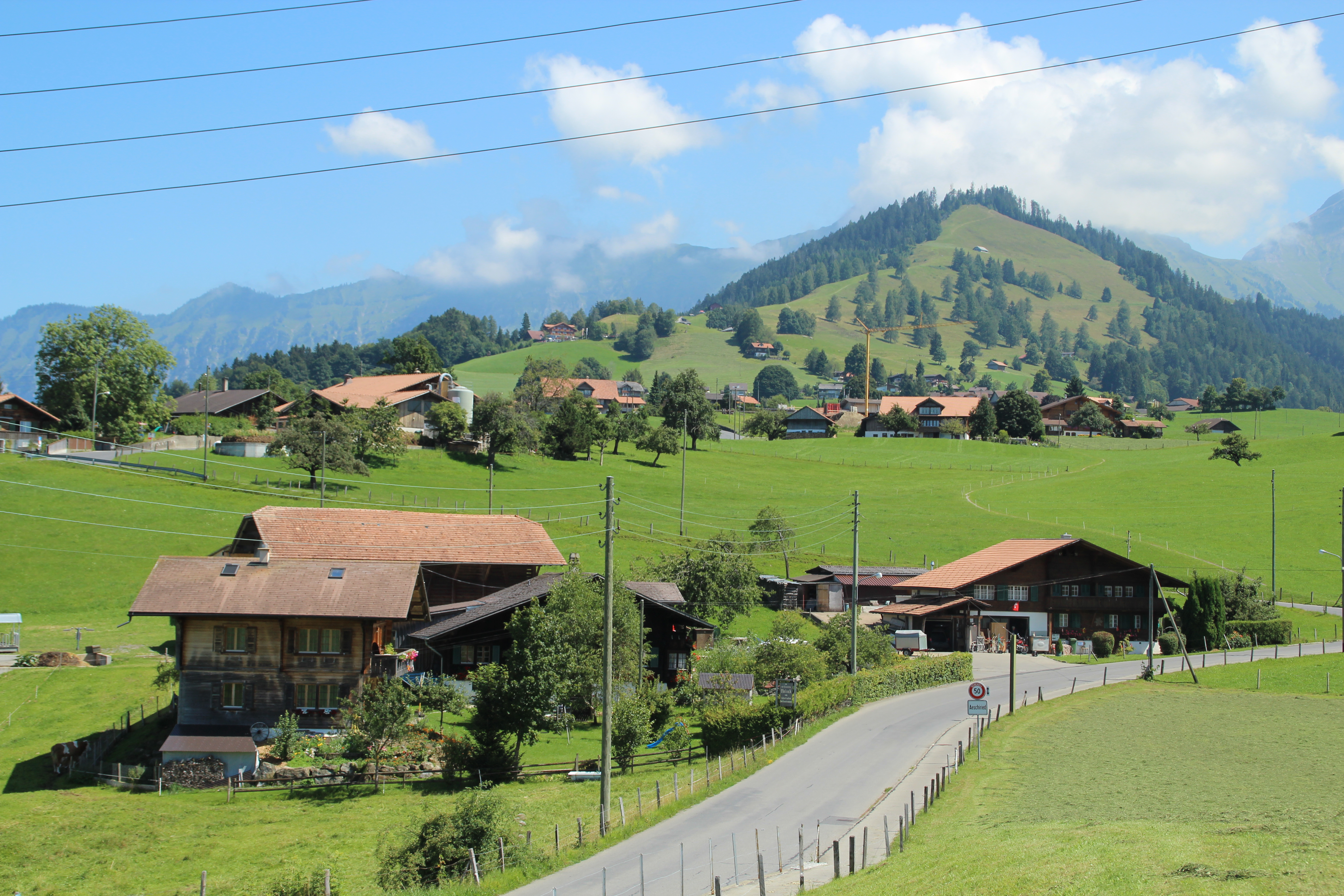
Farm houses and vacation houses in Aeschiried

Aeschi bei Spiez has a population (as of December 2020) of 2,256. As of 2010, 4.9% of the population are resident foreign nationals. Over the last 10 years (2000-2010) the population has changed at a rate of 8.4%. Migration accounted for 9.6%, while births and deaths accounted for -0.1%.

Most of the population (as of 2000) speaks German (1,927 or 95.2%) as their first language, Serbo-Croatian is the second most common (25 or 1.2%) and Albanian is the third (19 or 0.9%). There are 10 people who speak French, 3 people who speak Italian.

As of 2008, the population was 50.2% male and 49.8% female. The population was made up of 977 Swiss men (47.4% of the population) and 57 (2.8%) non-Swiss men. There were 984 Swiss women (47.7%) and 43 (2.1%) non-Swiss women. Of the population in the municipality, 738 or about 36.4% were born in Aeschi bei Spiez and lived there in 2000. There were 803 or 39.7% who were born in the same canton, while 252 or 12.4% were born somewhere else in Switzerland, and 158 or 7.8% were born outside of Switzerland.

As of 2010, children and teenagers (0–19 years old) make up 23.4% of the population, while adults (20–64 years old) make up 60.2% and seniors (over 64 years old) make up 16.4%.

As of 2000, there were 924 people who were single and never married in the municipality. There were 902 married individuals, 116 widows or widowers and 83 individuals who are divorced.

As of 2000, there were 223 households that consist of only one person and 95 households with five or more people. In 2000, a total of 709 apartments (71.9% of the total) were permanently occupied, while 239 apartments (24.2%) were seasonally occupied and 38 apartments (3.9%) were empty. As of 2010, the construction rate of new housing units was 3.4 new units per 1000 residents. The vacancy rate for the municipality, in 2011, was 0.08%.

The historical population is given in the following chart:

== Politics ==
In the 2011 federal election the most popular party was the Swiss People's Party (SVP) which received 42.2% of the vote. The next three most popular parties were the Conservative Democratic Party (BDP) (15.1%), the Social Democratic Party (SP) (9.8%) and the Evangelical People's Party (EVP) (6.7%). In the federal election, a total of 928 votes were cast, and the voter turnout was 57.9%.

== Economy ==
As of 2011, Aeschi bei Spiez had an unemployment rate of 0.66%. As of 2008, there were a total of 871 people employed in the municipality. Of these, there were 177 people employed in the primary economic sector and about 71 businesses involved in this sector. 123 people were employed in the secondary sector and there were 20 businesses in this sector. 571 people were employed in the tertiary sector, with 75 businesses in this sector. There were 970 residents of the municipality who were employed in some capacity, of which females made up 42.0% of the workforce.

In 2008 there were a total of 625 full-time equivalent jobs. The number of jobs in the primary sector was 103, of which 101 were in agriculture and 1 was in forestry or lumber production. The number of jobs in the secondary sector was 113 of which 24 or (21.2%) were in manufacturing and 89 (78.8%) were in construction. The number of jobs in the tertiary sector was 409. In the tertiary sector; 48 or 11.7% were in wholesale or retail sales or the repair of motor vehicles, 55 or 13.4% were in the movement and storage of goods, 108 or 26.4% were in a hotel or restaurant, 12 or 2.9% were technical professionals or scientists, 32 or 7.8% were in education and 120 or 29.3% were in health care.

In 2000, there were 298 workers who commuted into the municipality and 497 workers who commuted away. The municipality is a net exporter of workers, with about 1.7 workers leaving the municipality for every one entering. Of the working population, 10.6% used public transportation to get to work, and 52.4% used a private car.

== Religion ==
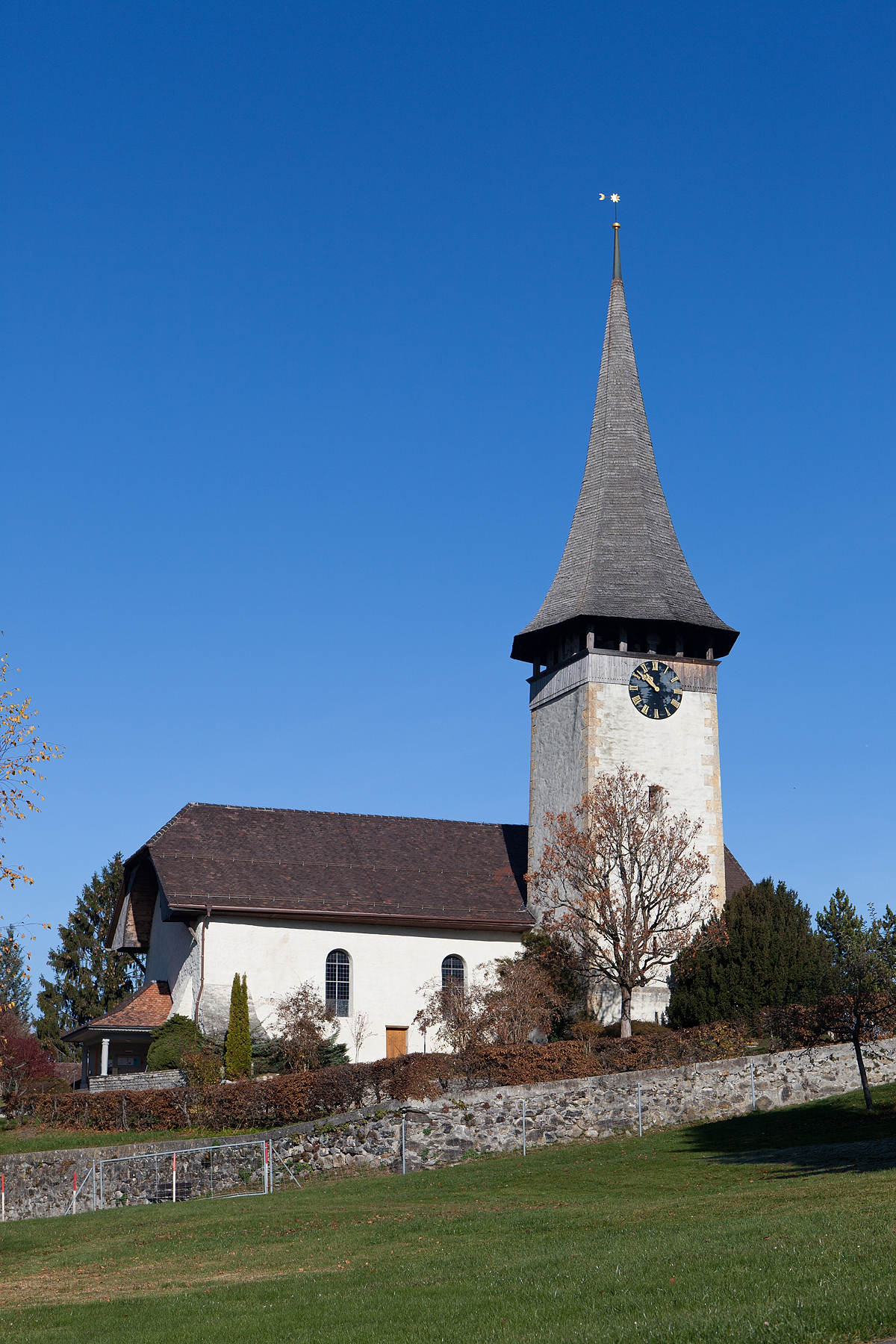
Aeschi bei Spiez Swiss Reformed church

From the 2000 census, 150 or 7.4% were Roman Catholic, while 1,560 or 77.0% belonged to the Swiss Reformed Church. Of the rest of the population, there were 28 members of an Orthodox church (or about 1.38% of the population), and there were 236 individuals (or about 11.65% of the population) who belonged to another Christian church. There was 1 individual who was Jewish, and 21 (or about 1.04% of the population) who were Islamic. There were 2 individuals who were Buddhist. 89 (or about 4.40% of the population) belonged to no church, are agnostic or atheist, and 55 individuals (or about 2.72% of the population) did not answer the question.

== Education ==
In Aeschi bei Spiez about 760 or (37.5%) of the population have completed non-mandatory upper secondary education, and 195 or (9.6%) have completed additional higher education (either university or a Fachhochschule). Of the 195 who completed tertiary schooling, 72.8% were Swiss men, 18.5% were Swiss women, 5.1% were non-Swiss men and 3.6% were non-Swiss women.

The Canton of Bern school system provides one year of non-obligatory Kindergarten, followed by six years of Primary school. This is followed by three years of obligatory lower Secondary school where the students are separated according to ability and aptitude. Following the lower Secondary students may attend additional schooling or they may enter an apprenticeship.

During the 2010-11 school year, there were a total of 283 students attending classes in Aeschi bei Spiez. There were 2 kindergarten classes with a total of 37 students in the municipality. Of the kindergarten students, 2.7% were permanent or temporary residents of Switzerland (not citizens). The municipality had 7 primary classes and 121 students. Of the primary students, 4.1% were permanent or temporary residents of Switzerland (not citizens) and 4.1% have a different mother language than the classroom language. During the same year, there were 5 lower secondary classes with a total of 103 students. and 2.9% have a different mother language than the classroom language.

As of 2000, there were 64 students in Aeschi bei Spiez who came from another municipality, while 52 residents attended schools outside the municipality.

Aeschi bei Spiez is home to the Bibliothek Aeschi library. The library has (as of 2008) 1,800 books or other media, and loaned out 750 items in the same year. It was open a total of 260 days with average of 39 hours per week during that year.
