= Drättehorn =

Mountain of the Bernese Alps

- Drettenhorn
- Location within Switzerland

Highest point
- Elevation: 2,794 m (9,167 ft)
- Prominence: 340 m (1,120 ft)
- Listing: Alpine mountains 2500-2999 m
- Coordinates: 46°34′56.5″N 7°49′25.9″E

Geography
- Location: Bern, Switzerland
- Parent range: Bernese Alps

The Drättehorn (also known as Drettenhorn) is a mountain of the Bernese Alps, located north of the Schilthorn in the Bernese Oberland.
