= National Register of Historic Places listings in Laurel County, Kentucky =

Location of Laurel County in Kentucky

This is a list of the National Register of Historic Places listings in Laurel County, Kentucky.

It is intended to be a complete list of the properties on the National Register of Historic Places in Laurel County, Kentucky, United States. The locations of National Register properties for which the latitude and longitude coordinates are included below, may be seen in a map.

There are 9 properties listed on the National Register in the county.

This National Park Service list is complete through NPS recent listings posted March 21, 2025.

== Current listings ==
	Name on the Register	Image	Date listed	Location	City or town	Description
1	Sue Bennett Memorial School Building	Sue Bennett Memorial School Building	September 11, 1979 (#79001017)	College St. 37°07′30″N 84°05′20″W	London	
2	Federal Building-Courthouse	Federal Building-Courthouse	August 19, 1974 (#74000889)	Main and 3rd Sts. 37°07′39″N 84°04′57″W	London	
3	First Evangelical Reformed Church	First Evangelical Reformed Church	April 22, 1980 (#80001648)	Kentucky Route 80; 37°09′25″N 84°11′38″W	Bernstadt	
4	London Downtown Historic District	London Downtown Historic District	November 10, 2011 (#11000793)	Main St. between W. 6th and W. 5th Sts. 37°07′45″N 84°05′02″W	London	
5	London Tuberculosis Hospital	London Tuberculosis Hospital	August 4, 2016 (#16000503)	85 State Police Rd. 37°08′43″N 84°06′19″W	London	
6	Pennington Infirmary	Pennington Infirmary	June 11, 1987 (#87000900)	411 Main St. 37°07′50″N 84°05′08″W	London	
7	Poynter Building	Poynter Building	August 8, 1985 (#85001745)	Main St. 37°07′44″N 84°05′04″W	London	
8	Harland Sanders Café	Harland Sanders Café	August 7, 1990 (#90001169)	Junction of W. Dixie Highway and E. Dixie Ave. 36°57′35″N 84°05′39″W	North Corbin	
9	Wildcat Battlefield Site		June 28, 1979 (#79001018)	13.4 miles north of London off U.S. Route 25; 37°15′43″N 84°12′01″W	London	Marks the site of the Battle of Camp Wildcat

== See also ==
- List of National Historic Landmarks in Kentucky
- National Register of Historic Places listings in Kentucky
