= Oberer Mannenberg Castle =

Castle in Zweisimmen Bern, Switzerland

- Burgruine Oberer Mannenberg
- Zweisimmen
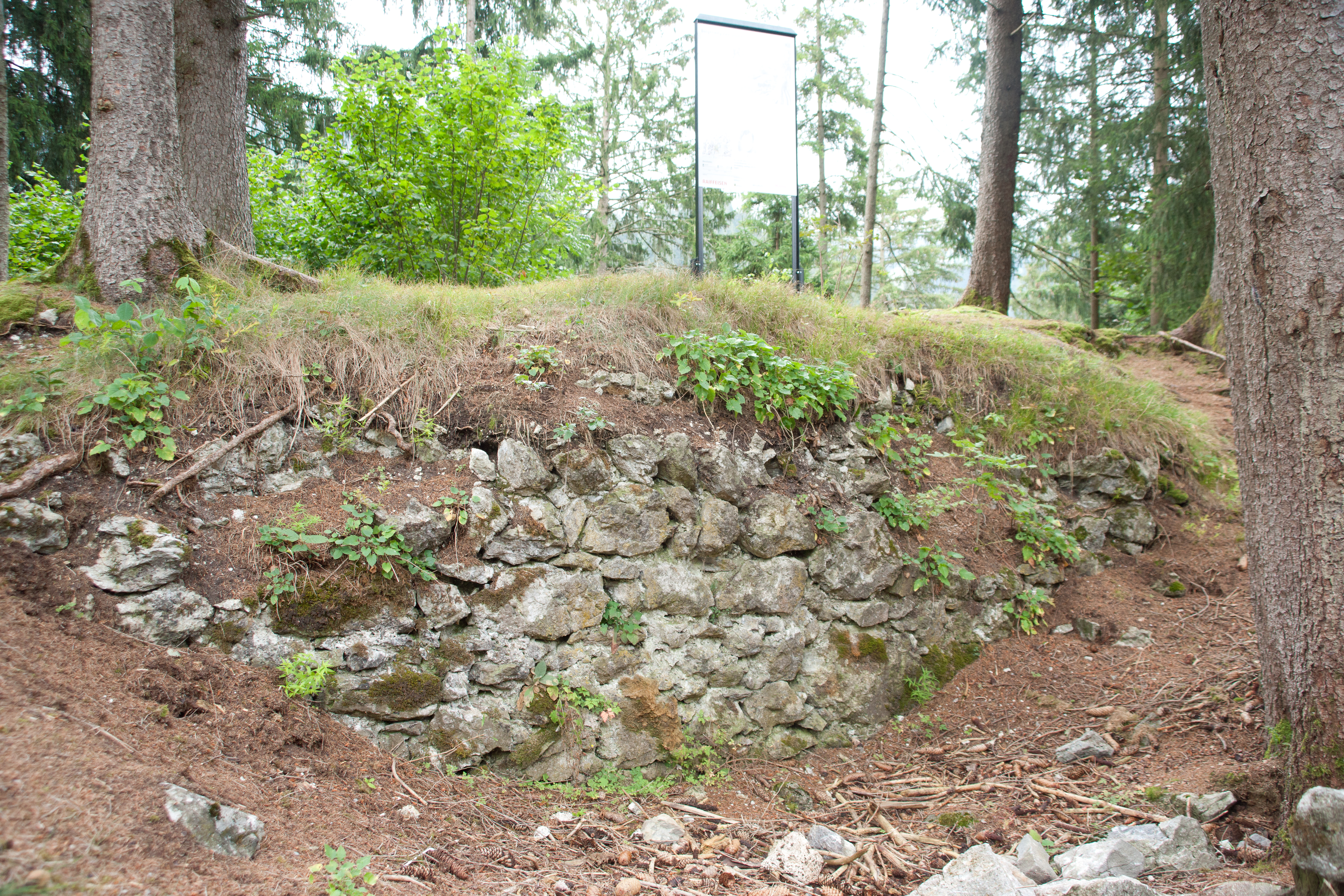
- Ruins of Oberer Mannenberg Castle

Site information
- Owner: Burg Mannenberg foundation
- Open to the public: yes

Location
- Coordinates: 46.5717°N 7.3820°E

Site history
- Materials: stone
- Battles/wars: Destroyed in Bernese attack, 1350

Oberer Mannenberg Castle (German: Oberer Mannenberg) is a ruined castle in the municipality of Zweisimmen of the canton of Bern in Switzerland. It is a Swiss heritage site of national significance.

== History ==
Nothing is known about the original builder of the castle, but in 1190 the Herren von Siebenthal may have lived in Mannenberg. In 1270 the castle Mamerberg was owned by the knight Peter von Raron. Under the von Raron family the estate was divided into the Mannenberg Castle and the Herrschaft of Mannenberg-Reichenstein. The castle is first mentioned in 1304 as castrum de Mannenberg and around that time Peter von Raron sold it to Heinrich IV von Strättlingen. The castle was sold to the Counts of Gruyères in 1336 while the estate passed to the heirs of the von Raron family following their extinction. In 1456 the Freiherr von Bubenberg acquired the Herrschaft and in 1494 sold it to the city of Bern.

The castle was held by the Counts who attempted to expand their power in the Simmental (Simme valley). At some point, probably in the 14th century, they built Unterer Mannenberg Castle as an expansion of the Oberer castle. In 1339 the Counts of Gruyères supported the city of Fribourg against Bern in the Battle of Laupen. The Bernese victory and their expanding power in the Simmental created tension between the Counts and the surrounding farmers. In 1350 Bernese troops attacked and partially destroyed Oberer Mannenberg Castle. It was apparently rebuilt, because in 1356 the Counts of Gruyères sold the castles to the Fribourg supporting Düdingen family. The Düdingens already held nearby Blankenburg Castle, so Mannenberg reinforced their power in the area. However, their hold was short lived. In 1376 the villagers of the surrounding communities rose up against the Fribourg nobility, forcing the Düdingens to sell Mannenberg and Blankenburg to the city of Fribourg.

Tensions continued to rise between Bern and Fribourg leading to the Battle of Sempach in 1386. Following the Bernese victory in the Battle, Fribourg lost their holdings in the Simmental. Bern combined the Herrschaft of Mannenberg-Reichenstein with the castles and appointed a vogt to oversee the lands. The vogt settled in Blankenburg Castle and made it into the center of government. Both Mannenberg castles were allowed to fall into ruin.

During the 20th century several archeological expeditions explored portions of the ruins, but they remained generally covered in brush. In 2007 the Burg Mannerberg Foundation was established to restore and maintain the ruins. The project was initially projected to cost about 770,000 CHF with the Swiss Federal government and the Canton of Bern providing the majority of the funds, while the Foundation provided about 194,000 CHF. The project was completed in 2011 at a total cost of about 880,000 CHF. Today several walls and parts of a round tower are free of the earth and stand in a clearing. The ruins of the castle are topped with a sight-seeing platform.

== See also ==
- List of castles in Switzerland
