= Blankenburg Castle =

Blankenburg Castle might refer to:

- Blankenburg Castle (Bern), a castle and administrative center in the municipality of Zweisimmen in the canton of Bern, Switzerland
- Blankenburg Castle (Essel), a former castle in the village of Engehausen in the municipality of Essel, Lower Saxony, Germany
- Blankenburg Castle (Harz), a castle in the town of Blankenburg in the district of Harz, Saxony-Anhalt, Germany
- Blankenburg Castle (Uckerland), a castle in Wolfhagen in the district of Uckermark, Brandenburg, Germany
