= Bernstadt =

Bernstadt may refer to:

- Bernstadt auf dem Eigen, a town in Saxony, Germany
- Bernstadt (Alb), a municipality in Baden-Württemberg, Germany
- Bernstadt, Kentucky, an unincorporated community in Laurel County, Kentucky, United States
- East Bernstadt, Kentucky, a census-designated place in Laurel County, Kentucky, United States
- Bernstadt an der Weide, older German name of Bierutów, Poland
- Duchy of Bernstadt, a Silesian duchy centred on the city of Bernstadt an der Weide
