= Carl Im Obersteg =

Swiss politician and businessman (1849–1926)

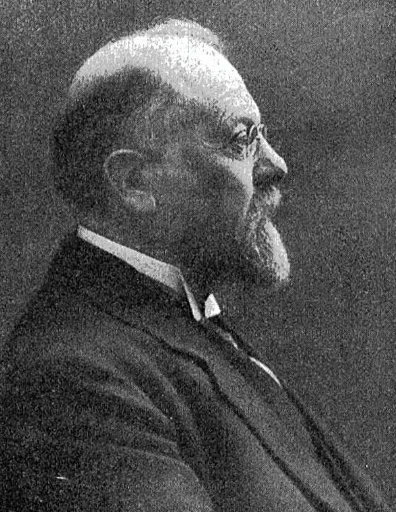
- Carl Im Obersteg (circa 1905)

Member of the Grand Council of Basel
- In office 1893–1902

Personal details
- Born: Karl Johann Im Obersteg; October 9, 1849 Boltigen, Switzerland
- Died: December 31, 1926 (aged 77) Basel, Basel-Stadt, Switzerland
- Spouse: Elisabeth Friedli (m. 1880; died 1926)
- Children: 2

Carl Johann Im Obersteg, also spelled Karl Johann Im Obersteg (October 9, 1849 – December 31, 1926), was a Swiss businessman, collector, and politician. He was a member of the Grand Council of Basel from 1893 to 1902 and from 1892 to 1919 representative of the city council for the Basel Historical Museum. He was primarily known for founding Im Obersteg & Cie. in Basel, a forwarding company and emigration agency. His son Carl Im Obersteg Jr. (1883–1969) and grandson (1914–1983) were industrialists and art patrons. Several pieces of the Im Obersteg Collection are on exhibition at the Kunstmuseum Basel.

== Early life and education ==
The Im Obersteg family originally hailed from Boltigen, Canton of Berne, Switzerland. Carl was born on October 9, 1849, as the eldest son to Johannes Im Obersteg (1809–1872), who was a physician, collector and aficionado of music and literature, and Margarita (née Hänseler). He initially began studying Jurisprudence at the University of Bern, however after the sudden death of his father, he had to return home to help his mother. He continued to study at the University of Zurich and the Université de Strasbourg but did not graduate and ultimately decided to start an apprenticeship instead with a London-based export company.

== Career ==
He launched his career while working in London, before entering the Zwilchenbart Company of Andreas Zwilchenbart (1786–1866) in Basel. The company was leading in organization of emigration into the New World at the time, which included booking of tickets, visas as well as financial services. In that period he undertook several voyages to the United States and Canada. In 1885, he participated in the founding of the Swiss colony of Bernstadt, Kentucky and has been a partner and representative in South Eastern and Chatham Railway, which operated between London and south-east England and the insurance company L'Urbaine Incendie et Vie in Paris, France.

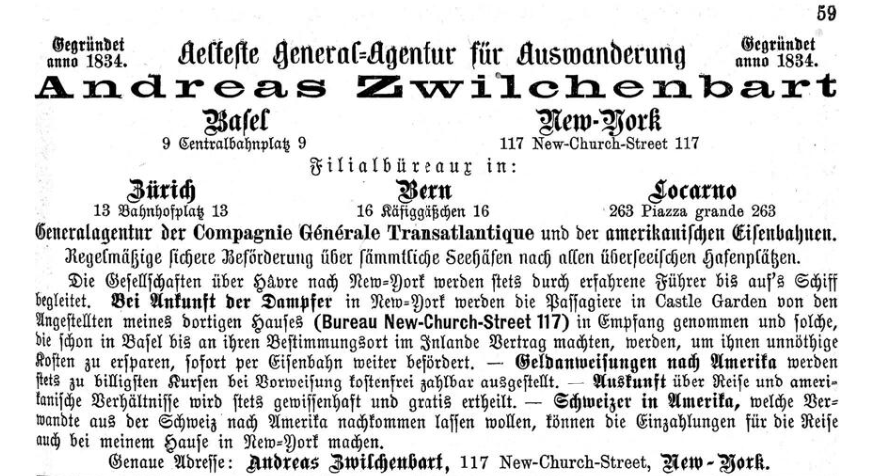
Advertising of Zwilchenbart Company

In 1887, he and his brother, founded a second company, in real estate he already acquired in 1878 from Matthias Oswald-Hintermann. In 1890, Obersteg took municipal citizenship (place of origin) in Basel and subsequently became a member of the city guild Geltenzunft. His emigration agency boomed until the end of World War I, after that the emigration policies became more strict, and fewer people emigrated from Switzerland. The Zwilchenbart Company focussed on leisure and business travelers and became market leader in this field. There were several joint-ventures with railway companies including investments and the foundation of the Aviation Society of Basel, which would later turn into the regional airline Balair. Zwilchenbart remained in family hands until it was sold to travel agency Bronner+Cie in 1952.

== Politics ==
Im Obersteg served as a member of the Grand Council of Basel from 1893 to 1902, where he commissioned the city council of the Historical Museum Basel from 1892 to 1919.

== Personal life ==
In 1874, Im Obersteg married the daughter of his former business partner Andreas Zwilchenbart (1786–1866), however this marriage was not happy, did not lead to any children and ended in divorce around 1878. In 1880, he married Elisabeth (née Friedlin; 1861–1937), originally of Steinen, Baden-Württemberg, German Empire. They had two sons;

- Carl Im Obersteg-Buess (1883–1969), industrialist, art collector and founder of the Im Obersteg Collection
- Armin Im Obersteg (1881–1969), lawyer

They resided at Främel Estate which was located at Bundesstrasse 19 in Basel.

== Literature ==
- Henrietta Mentha, Michael Baumgartner; Die Sammlung Im Obersteg im Kunstmuseum Basel; Stiftung Im Obersteg 2004
