= Boltigen =

- Municipality
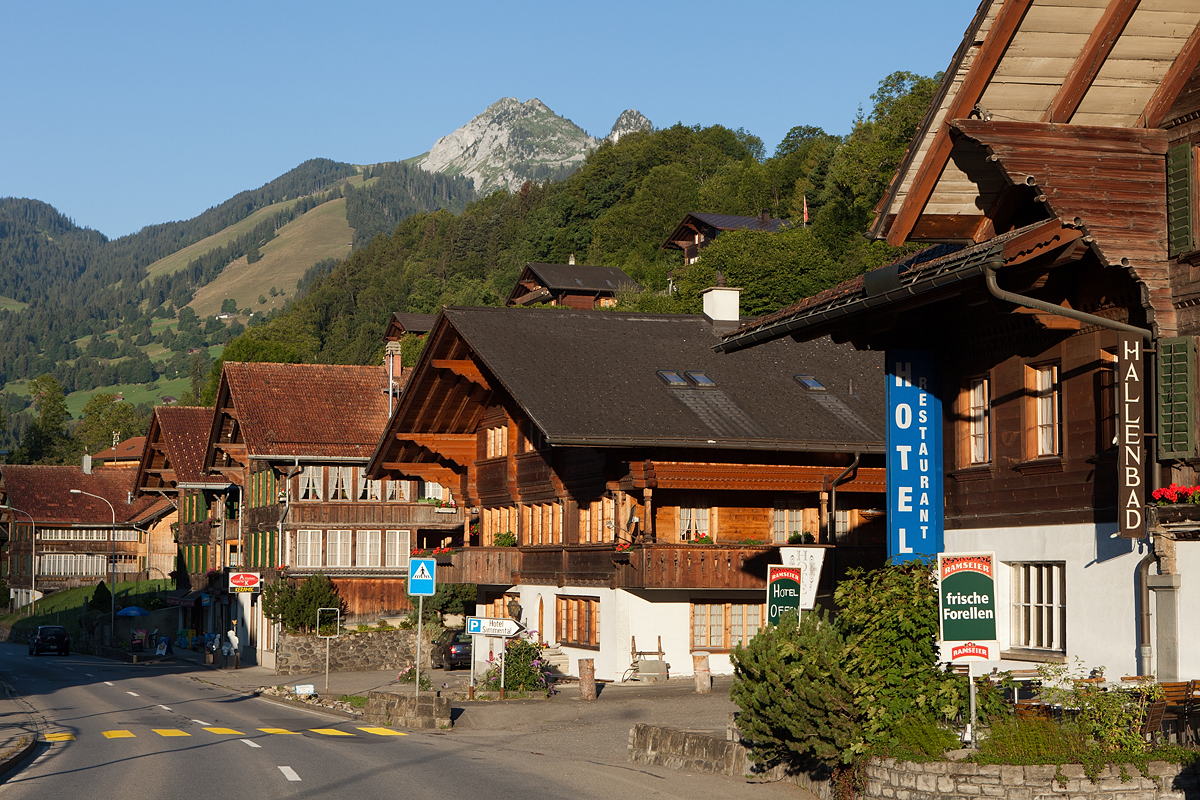
- Boltigen village

- Flag Coat of arms
- Location of Boltigen
- Location within Switzerland Location within Canton of Bern
- Coordinates: 46°37′N 7°23′E
- Country: Switzerland
- Canton: Bern
- District: Obersimmental-Saanen

Government
  - Mayor: Gemeindepräsident; Klaus Meinen-Roschi (as of 2008)

Area
  - Total: 77 km^{2} (30 sq mi)
- Elevation: 814 m (2,671 ft)

Population (Dec 2011)
  - Total: 1,367
  - Density: 18/km^{2} (46/sq mi)
- Time zone: UTC+01:00 (CET)
  - Summer (DST): UTC+02:00 (CEST)
- Postal code: 3766
- SFOS number: 791
- ISO 3166 code: CH-BE
- Surrounded by: Diemtigen, Jaun (FR), Oberwil im Simmental, Plaffeien (FR), Saanen, Zweisimmen
- Website: www.boltigen.ch

Boltigen (German pronunciation: [ˈbɔltɪɡn̩]) is a municipality in the Obersimmental-Saanen administrative district in the canton of Bern in Switzerland.

Boltigen is a mixed community, with traits both of a burgess community and a village community. Beside it, there is also a reformed evangelical Church community. The history of the community goes back to 1386 and the so-called Freiheitsbrief von 1386.

The community president is Hermann Maurer, since 1 January 2005.

== History ==
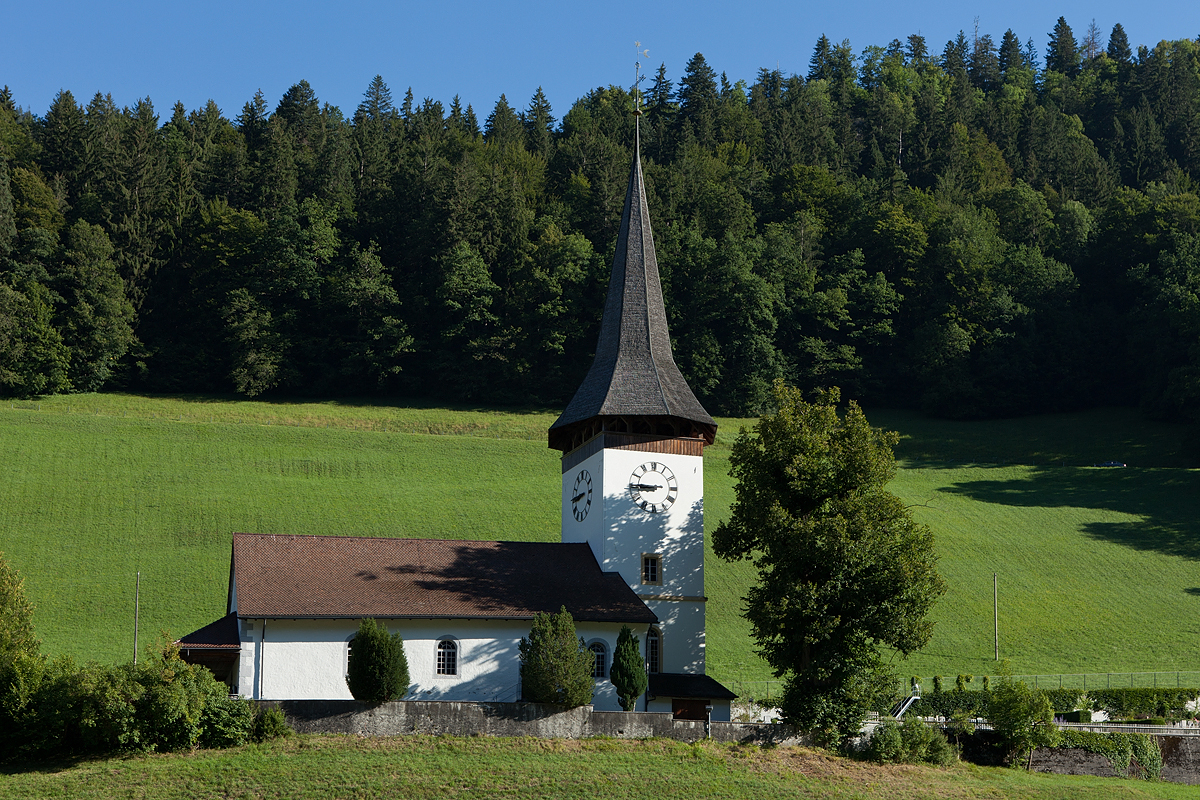
Boltigen village church

Boltigen is first mentioned in 1276.

The oldest trace of a settlement in the area is the Mesolithic shelter in the Ranggiloch cave. A few Bronze Age artifacts have also been found. During the Middle Ages there were forts or castles at Simmenegg, Eichstalden and Laubegg though all three have fallen into ruin. Many of the villages and Bäuerten were founded in the Early Middle Ages and grew slowly over the following centuries. The villages and farmlands came under Bernese control partly in 1386 and completely in 1391. When Bern acquired the lands, Adlemsried, Boltigen, Eschi, Schwarzenmatt and Weissenbach were all listed as villages. Until the 15th century, Pfaffenried village (now part of Oberwil im Simmental) was part of Boltigen. In 1502 Littisbach and Unterbächen were transferred from Zweisimmen to the municipality.

The local church of St. Mauritius was first mentioned in 1228. The town of Boltigen experienced the trial of a man named Stedelen, who confessed under torture, the charges of summoning the devil between 1397 and 1406. In 1528, Bern accepted the new faith of the Protestant Reformation, however the Bernese Oberland resisted the new faith and the church at Boltigen was part of the resistance. When Bern forced the Oberland to accept the Reformation, Boltigen also converted. The church was destroyed in a fire in 1840 and rebuilt shortly thereafter.

Traditionally, the villagers imported grain from Bern and raised cattle on the valley floor and in seasonal alpine herding camps. Beginning in the 18th century, they began breeding and milking Simmental cattle, which became major exports from the municipality. During the 18th and 19th century coal mines at Walopalp provided another source of income. There was also some trade over the Jaun Pass. The construction of the Simmental road in 1815-28 and the Jaun Pass road in 1872-75 expanded trade in the village and allowed it to grow. The construction of the Erlenbach-Zweisimmen railway in 1902 made it easier to reach villages and allowed them to grow further. Unlike some communities in the Oberland, tourism never developed into a major industry. In 1990 about one-third of the jobs in the services sector, while 44% of the jobs are in agriculture.

== Geography ==
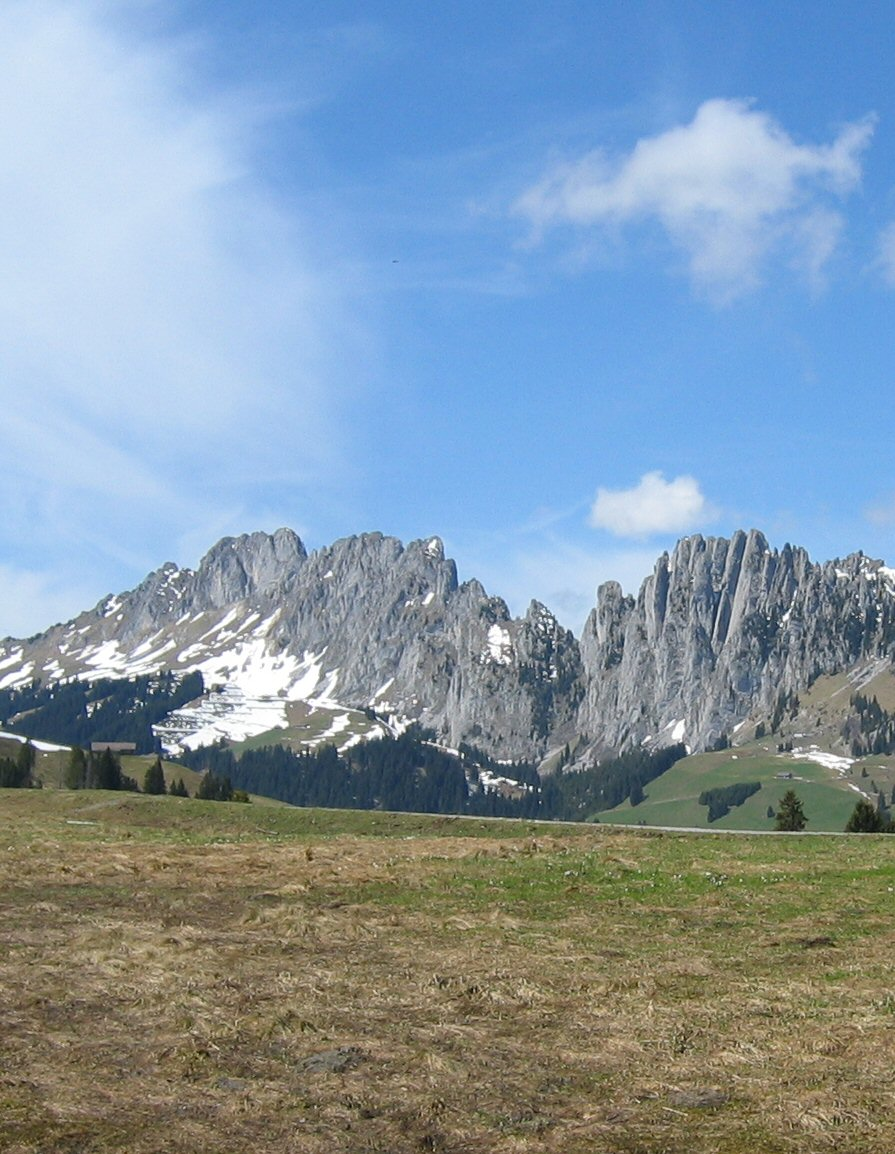
Jaun Pass near Boltigen

Boltigen has an area of 77.07 km^{2} (29.76 sq mi). As of 2012, a total of 40.82 km^{2} (15.76 mi^{2}) or 53.0% is used for agricultural purposes, while 27.22 km^{2} (10.51 mi^{2}) or 35.3% is forested. The rest of the municipality is 1.85 km^{2} (0.71 mi^{2}) or 2.4% is settled (buildings or roads), 0.42 km^{2} (0.16 mi^{2}) or 0.5% is either rivers or lakes and 6.65 km^{2} (2.57 mi^{2}) or 8.6% is unproductive land.

During the same year, housing and buildings made up 1.0% and transportation infrastructure made up 1.2%. A total of 29.7% of the total land area is heavily forested and 4.6% is covered with orchards or small clusters of trees. Of the agricultural land, 12.6% is pasturage and 40.3% is used for alpine pastures. All the water in the municipality is flowing water. Of the unproductive areas, 5.8% is unproductive vegetation and 2.8% is too rocky for vegetation.

Boltigen lies in the Bernese Oberland in Obersimmental beneath Zweisimmen. The Jaunpass lies in the community's area. The neighboring communities to the North are, clockwise, Oberwil im Simmental, Diemtigen, Zweisimmen, Saanen, Jaun and Plaffeien.

The municipality includes the cooperative farms (Bäuerten) of Boltigen, Adlemsried, Eschi, Oberbäuert (which includes Littisbach and Unterbächen), Reidenbach, Schwarzenmatt, Simmenegg and Weissenbach. The area includes the valley floor around the Simme River, both sides of the valley and the surrounding mountains up to an altitude of 2,235 m (7,333 ft).

On 31 December 2009 Amtsbezirk Obersimmental, the municipality's former district, was dissolved. On the following day, 1 January 2010, it joined the newly created Verwaltungskreis Obersimmental-Saanen.

== Coat of arms ==
The blazon of the municipal coat of arms is Argent a Semi Bear Sable langued Gules issuant from a Mount of 3 Coupeaux of the last.

== Demographics ==
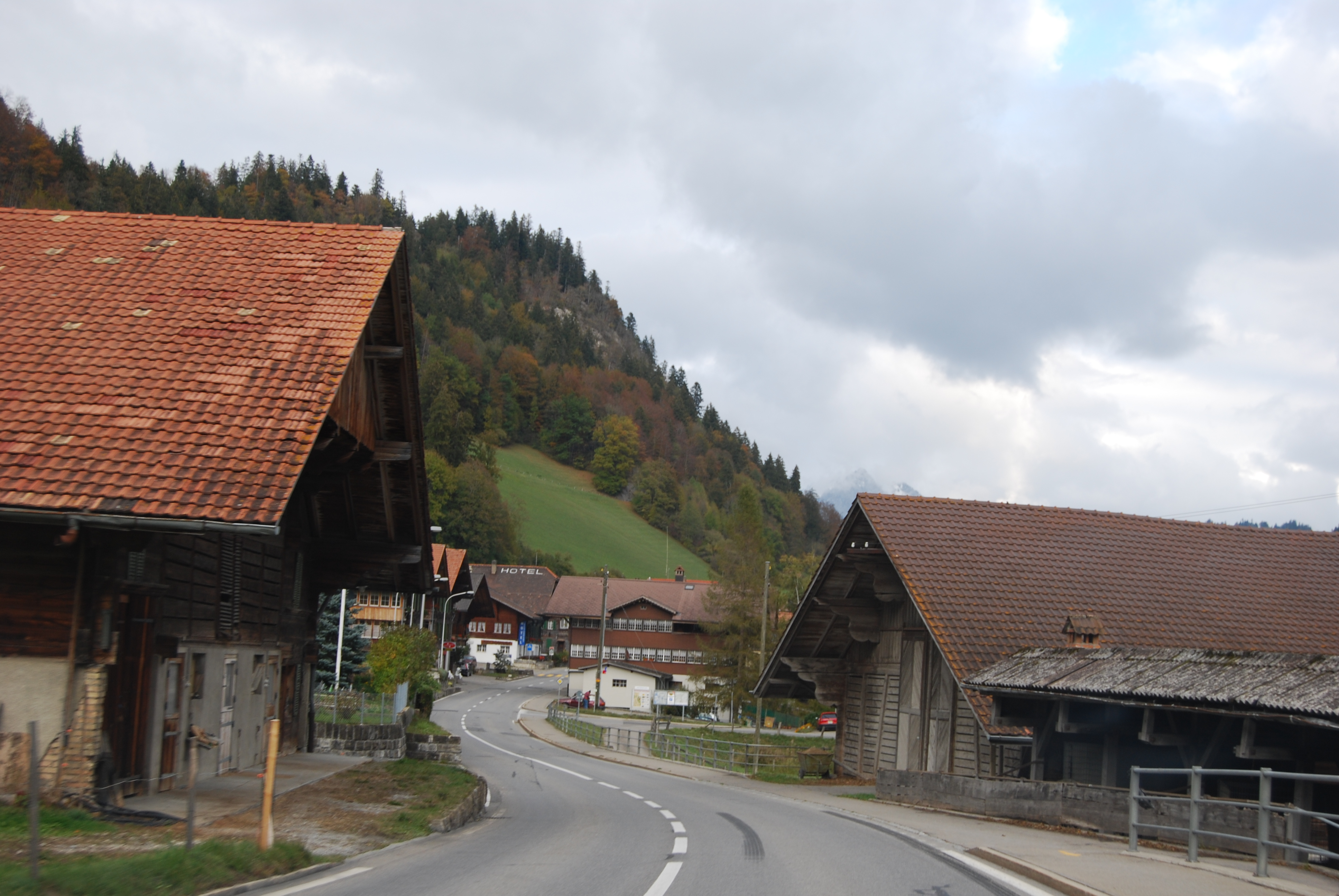
Boltigen village

Boltigen has a population (as of December 2020) of 1,249. As of 2011, 3.7% of the population are resident foreign nationals. Over the last year (2010–2011) the population has changed at a rate of -0.7%. Migration accounted for -0.1%, while births and deaths accounted for -0.6%.

Most of the population (as of 2000) speaks German (1,392 or 96.9%) as their first language, Albanian is the second most common (18 or 1.3%) and French is the third (7 or 0.5%). There are 2 people who speak Italian.

As of 2008, the population was 51.7% male and 48.3% female. The population was made up of 682 Swiss men (49.6% of the population) and 29 (2.1%) non-Swiss men. There were 639 Swiss women (46.4%) and 26 (1.9%) non-Swiss women. Of the population in the municipality, 870 or about 60.6% were born in Boltigen and lived there in 2000. There were 363 or 25.3% who were born in the same canton, while 104 or 7.2% were born somewhere else in Switzerland, and 65 or 4.5% were born outside of Switzerland.

As of 2011, children and teenagers (0–19 years old) make up 20% of the population, while adults (20–64 years old) make up 58.4% and seniors (over 64 years old) make up 21.6%.

As of 2000, there were 573 people who were single and never married in the municipality. There were 723 married individuals, 100 widows or widowers and 40 individuals who are divorced.

As of 2010, there were 180 households that consist of only one person and 49 households with five or more people. In 2000, a total of 518 apartments (70.0% of the total) were permanently occupied, while 163 apartments (22.0%) were seasonally occupied and 59 apartments (8.0%) were empty. The vacancy rate for the municipality, in 2010, was 0.72%. In 2011, single family homes made up 44.0% of the total housing in the municipality.

The historical population is given in the following chart:

== Heritage sites of national significance ==
The farm house at Adlemsried 85, the farm house at Weissenbach 543 and the Ranggiloch mesolithic shelter are listed as Swiss heritage site of national significance. The entire village of Boltigen and the hamlet of Adlemsried are part of the Inventory of Swiss Heritage Sites.

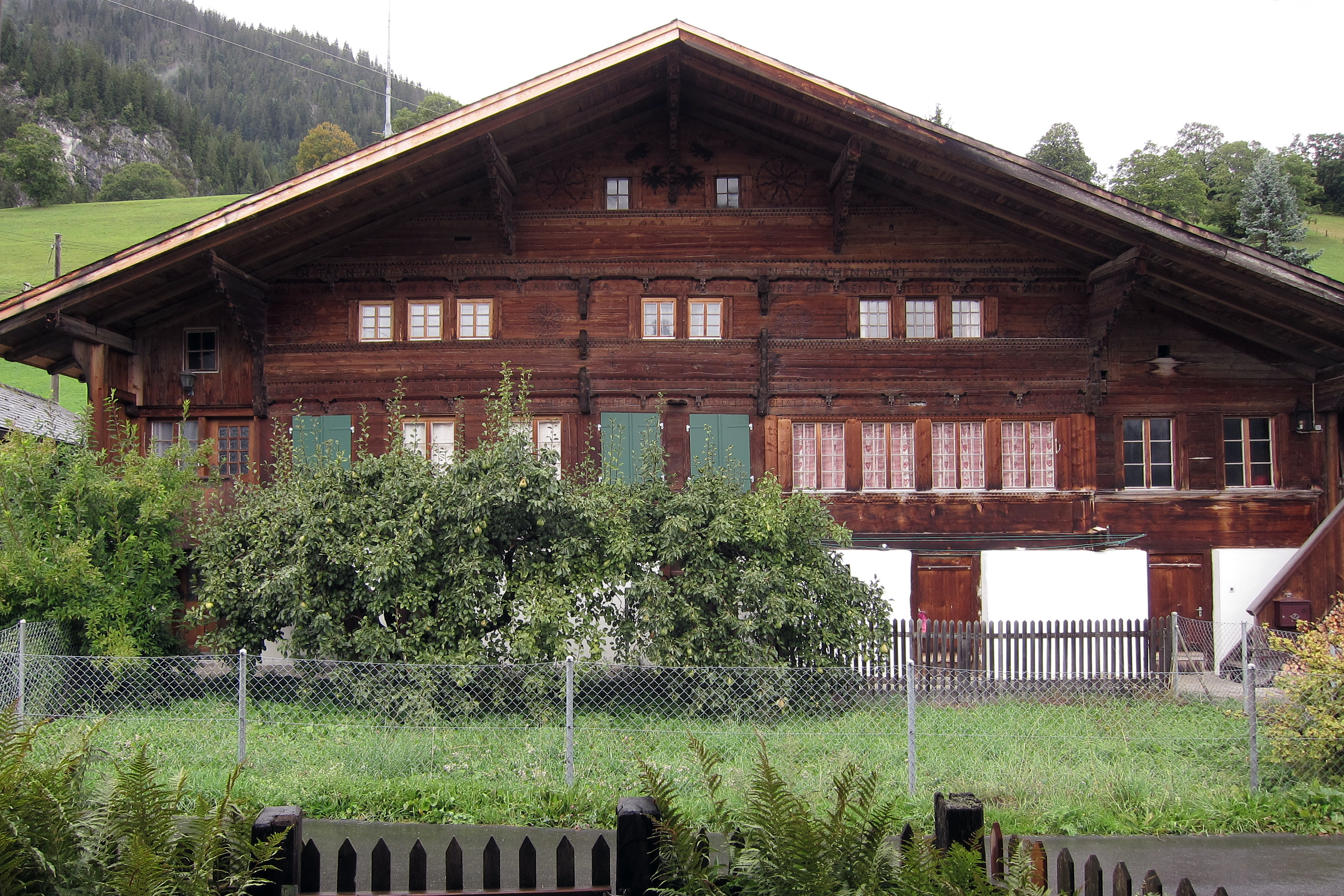
Farm House at Adlemsried 85

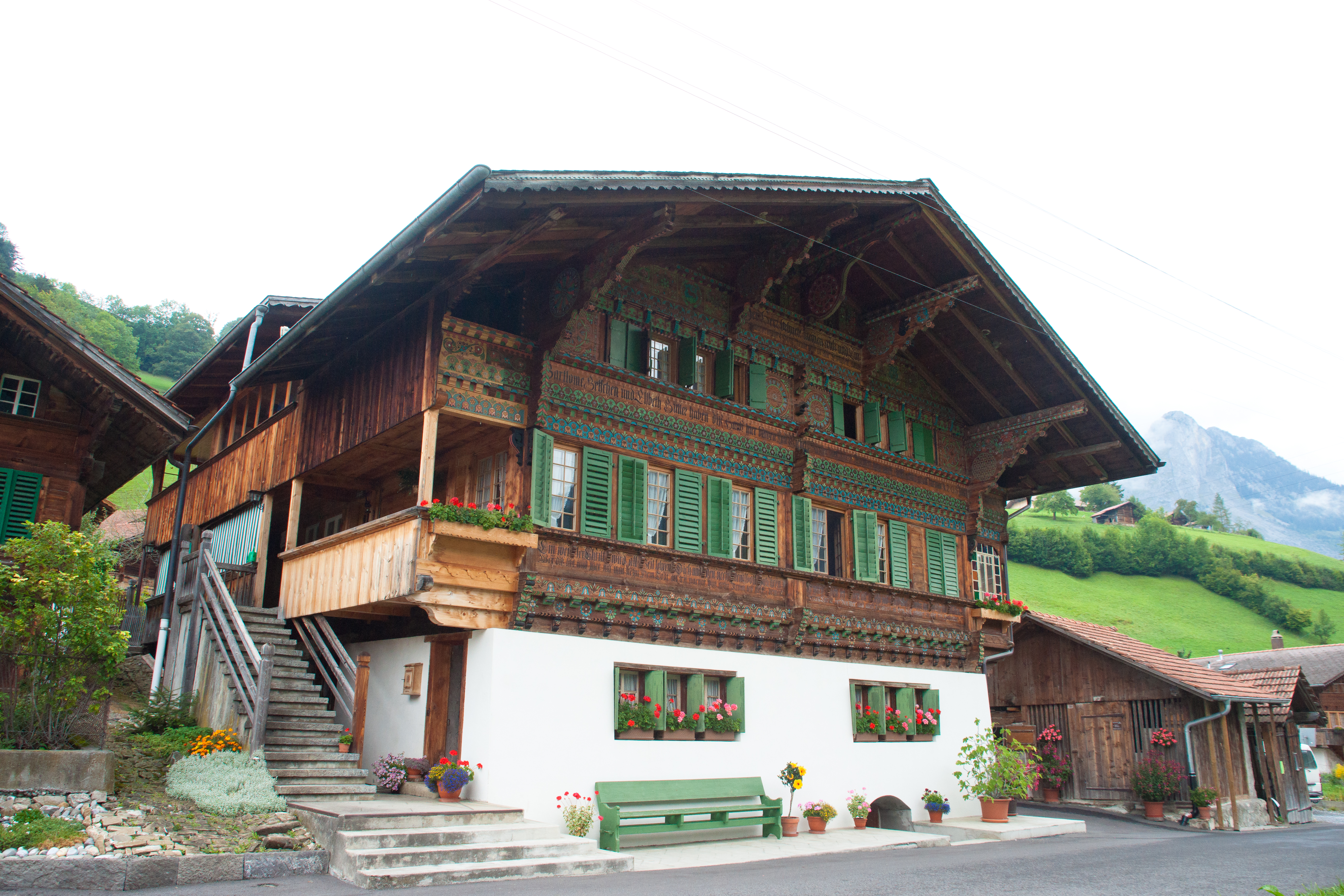
Farm House at Weissenbach 543

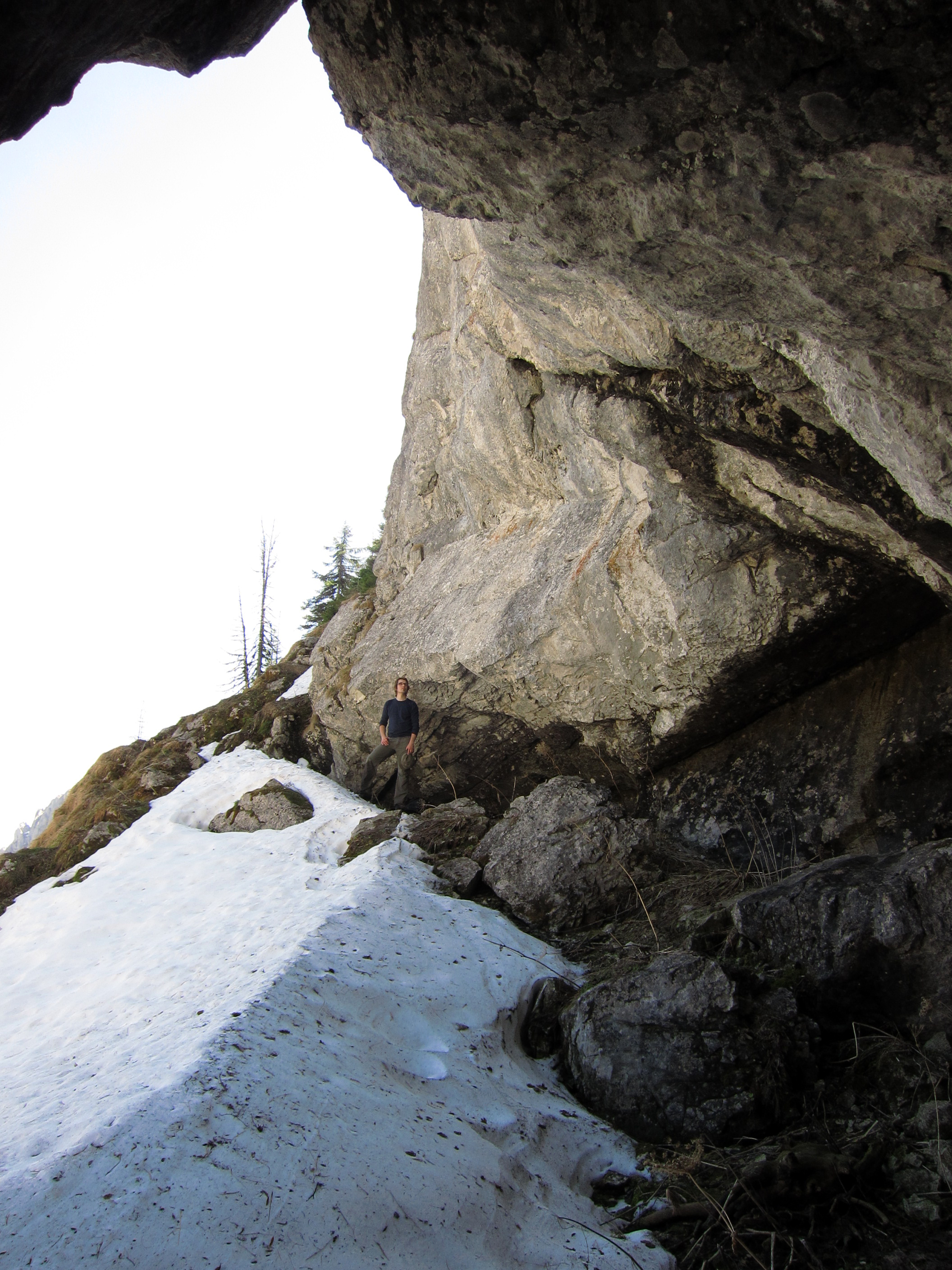
Ranggiloch mesolithic shelter

== Politics ==
In the 2011 federal election the most popular party was the Swiss People's Party (SVP) which received 58.3% of the vote. The next three most popular parties were the Conservative Democratic Party (BDP) (16.2%), the Social Democratic Party (SP) (8.2%) and the Green Party (4.4%). In the federal election, a total of 542 votes were cast, and the voter turnout was 48.6%.

== Economy ==
As of 2011, Boltigen had an unemployment rate of 0.8%. As of 2008, there were a total of 486 people employed in the municipality. Of these, there were 282 people employed in the primary economic sector and about 102 businesses involved in this sector. 67 people were employed in the secondary sector and there were 16 businesses in this sector. 137 people were employed in the tertiary sector, with 43 businesses in this sector. There were 645 residents of the municipality who were employed in some capacity, of which females made up 38.0% of the workforce.

In 2008 there were a total of 350 full-time equivalent jobs. The number of jobs in the primary sector was 178, of which 174 were in agriculture and 3 were in forestry or lumber production. The number of jobs in the secondary sector was 61 of which 23 or (37.7%) were in manufacturing and 37 (60.7%) were in construction. The number of jobs in the tertiary sector was 111. In the tertiary sector; 26 or 23.4% were in wholesale or retail sales or the repair of motor vehicles, 21 or 18.9% were in the movement and storage of goods, 31 or 27.9% were in a hotel or restaurant, 2 or 1.8% were the insurance or financial industry, 3 or 2.7% were technical professionals or scientists, 15 or 13.5% were in education and 3 or 2.7% were in health care.

In 2000, there were 60 workers who commuted into the municipality and 261 workers who commuted away. The municipality is a net exporter of workers, with about 4.4 workers leaving the municipality for every one entering. A total of 384 workers (86.5% of the 444 total workers in the municipality) both lived and worked in Boltigen. Of the working population, 11.5% used public transportation to get to work, and 46.8% used a private car.

In 2011 the average local and cantonal tax rate on a married resident, with two children, of Boltigen making 150,000 CHF was 12.6%, while an unmarried resident's rate was 18.5%. For comparison, the average rate for the entire canton in the same year, was 14.2% and 22.0%, while the nationwide average was 12.3% and 21.1% respectively.

In 2009 there were a total of 517 tax payers in the municipality. Of that total, 98 made over 75,000 CHF per year. There were 5 people who made between 15,000 and 20,000 per year. The greatest number of workers, 133, made between 50,000 and 75,000 CHF per year. The average income of the over 75,000 CHF group in Boltigen was 100,235 CHF, while the average across all of Switzerland was 130,478 CHF.

In 2011 a total of 2.0% of the population received direct financial assistance from the government.

== Religion ==
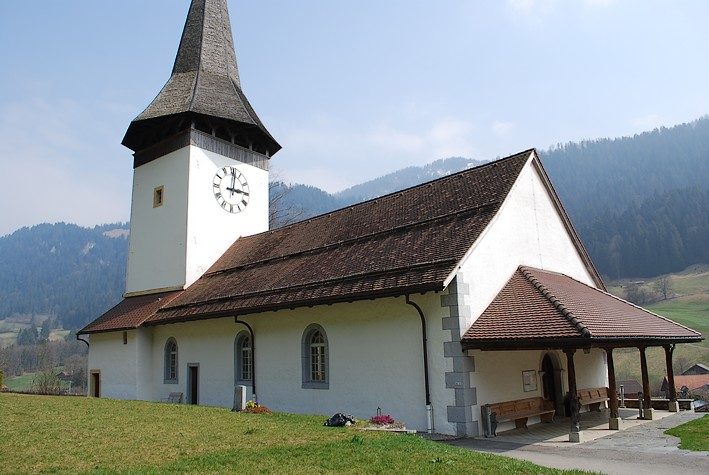
Boltigen village church

From the 2000 census, 1,276 or 88.9% belonged to the Swiss Reformed Church, while 39 or 2.7% were Roman Catholic. Of the rest of the population, there were 5 members of an Orthodox church (or about 0.35% of the population), and there were 23 individuals (or about 1.60% of the population) who belonged to another Christian church. There were 33 (or about 2.30% of the population) who were Muslim. There were 3 individuals who were Buddhist. 26 (or about 1.81% of the population) belonged to no church, are agnostic or atheist, and 31 individuals (or about 2.16% of the population) did not answer the question.

== Transport ==
Boltigen sits on the Spiez–Zweisimmen line and is served by trains at the Boltigen and Weissenbach railway stations.

== Climate ==
Between 1981 and 2010 Boltigen had an average of 142.2 days of rain or snow per year and on average received 1,404 mm (55.3 in) of precipitation. The wettest month was July during which time Boltigen received an average of 154 mm (6.1 in) of rain or snow. During this month there was precipitation for an average of 13.3 days. The month with the most days of precipitation was May, with an average of 14.2, but with only 130 mm (5.1 in) of rain or snow. The driest month of the year was April with an average of 91 mm (3.6 in) of precipitation over 12 days.

== Education ==
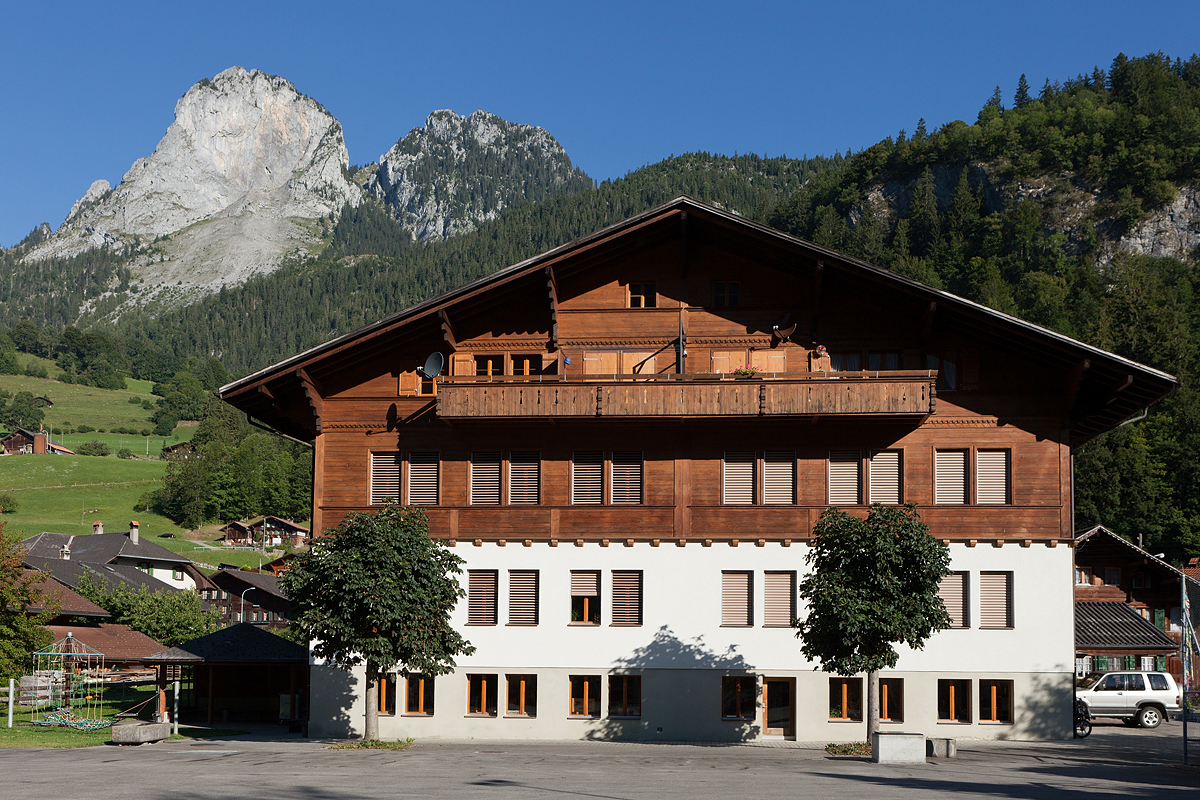
Boltigen village school house

In Boltigen about 48.2% of the population have completed non-mandatory upper secondary education, and 7.8% have completed additional higher education (either university or a Fachhochschule). Of the 67 who had completed some form of tertiary schooling listed in the census, 73.1% were Swiss men, 20.9% were Swiss women.

The Canton of Bern school system provides one year of non-obligatory Kindergarten, followed by six years of Primary school. This is followed by three years of obligatory lower Secondary school where the students are separated according to ability and aptitude. Following the lower Secondary students may attend additional schooling or they may enter an apprenticeship.

During the 2011–12 school year, there were a total of 128 students attending classes in Boltigen. There was one kindergarten class with a total of 20 students in the municipality. The municipality had 4 primary classes and 64 students. Of the primary students, 1.6% were permanent or temporary residents of Switzerland (not citizens) and 1.6% have a different mother language than the classroom language. During the same year, there were 2 lower secondary classes with a total of 44 students. There were 2.3% who were permanent or temporary residents of Switzerland (not citizens) and 2.3% have a different mother language than the classroom language.

As of 2000, there were a total of 299 students attending any school in the municipality. Of those, 231 both lived and attended school in the municipality, while 68 students came from another municipality. During the same year, 24 residents attended schools outside the municipality.

== Notable people ==
- Franjo von Allmen (born 2001), alpine ski racer
- Carl Im Obersteg (1849–1926), businessman and politician
- Hansruedi Schafroth (born 1934), sports shooter
