= Hansruedi Schafroth =

Swiss sports shooter (born 1934)

Personal information
- Born: 9 September 1934 (age 91) Boltigen, Switzerland

Sport
- Sport: Sports shooting

Hansruedi Schafroth (born 9 September 1934) is a Swiss former sports shooter. He competed in the 50 metre rifle, prone event at the 1968 Summer Olympics.
