= Zweisimmen =

- Municipality
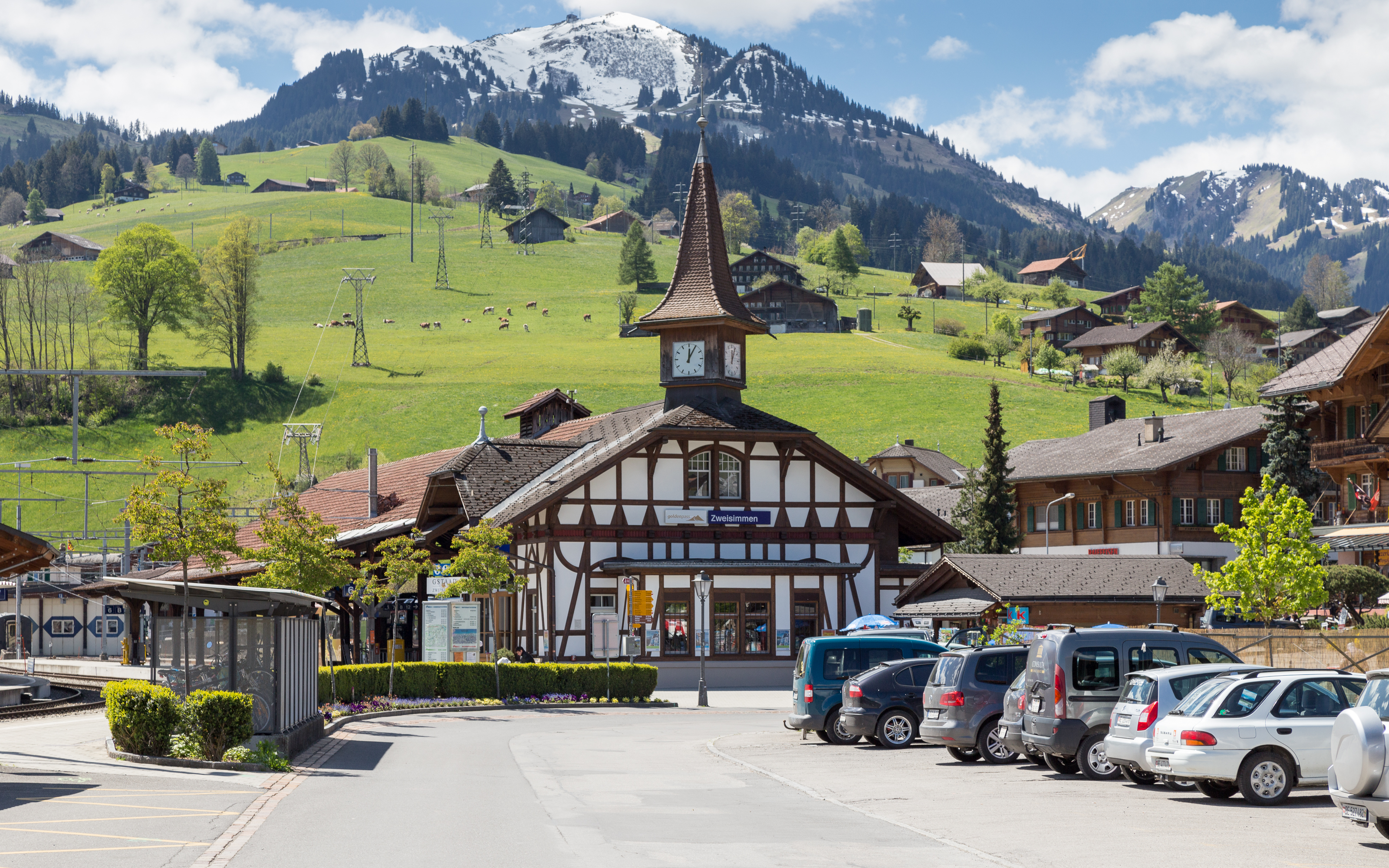
- The railway station with the Rinderberg in background, 2014

- Flag Coat of arms
- Location of Zweisimmen
- Location within Switzerland Location within Canton of Bern
- Coordinates: 46°33′N 7°22′E
- Country: Switzerland
- Canton: Bern
- District: Obersimmental-Saanen

Area
  - Total: 73.1 km^{2} (28.2 sq mi)
- Elevation: 947 m (3,107 ft)
- Highest elevation: 2,476 m (8,123 ft)
- Lowest elevation: 880 m (2,890 ft)

Population (Dec 2011)
  - Total: 2,947
  - Density: 40.3/km^{2} (104/sq mi)
- Time zone: UTC+01:00 (CET)
  - Summer (DST): UTC+02:00 (CEST)
- Postal code: 3770
- SFOS number: 794
- ISO 3166 code: CH-BE
- Surrounded by: Boltigen, Diemtigen, Saanen, Sankt Stephan
- Twin towns: Oberrot (Germany)
- Website: www.zweisimmen.ch

Zweisimmen (Highest Alemannic: Zwüüsimme) is a municipality in the Obersimmental-Saanen administrative district in the canton of Bern in Switzerland.

== History ==
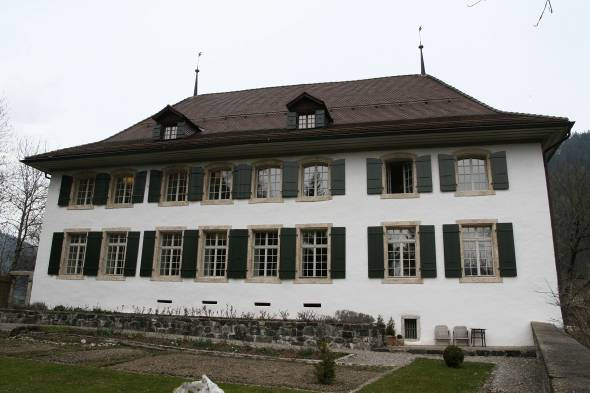
Blankenburg Castle, seat of the Bernese administrator 1386-1798, 2007

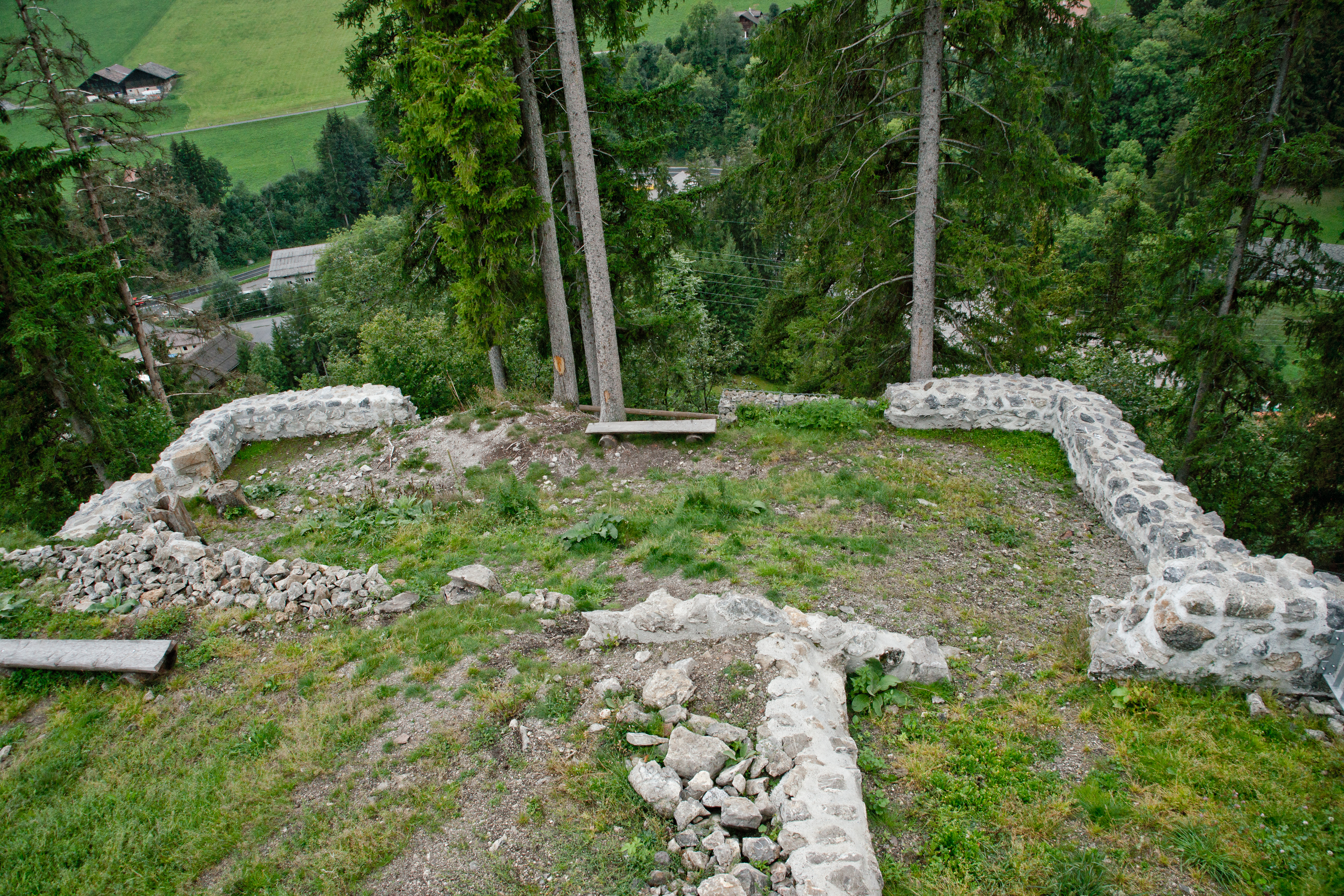
Ruins of the Lower Mannenberg Castle, 2011

Zweisimmen is first mentioned in 1228 as Duessimenes. In 1257, it was mentioned as Zweinlixhenun.

The oldest trace of a settlement in the area are some scattered mesolithic artifacts from Mannenberg-Riedli. The remains of a Roman era settlement were found at Mannried.

During the Middle Ages, a significant trade route over the Alps to Valais and Lake Geneva passed through the Zweisimmen region. A number of farming villages probably existed in the area during that time. In the 13th and 14th centuries, local nobles built several castles, Upper Mannenberg and Lower Mannenberg, Reichenstein-Terenstein, Blankenburg and Steinegg Castles, to protect and collect taxes from the roads.

The villages and castles passed through several noble families until 1378 when the Lord of Düdingen sold the lands to Fribourg following an uprising. After the Battle of Sempach in 1386, Bern conquered the Simmen river valley (Simmental) and acquired Zweisimmen. The Bernese administrator over the upper Simmen valley was installed at Blankenburg Castle. Reichenstein-Terenstein Castle and estates were acquired by the Bubenberg family in 1456, and sold to Bern in 1493. Blankenburg village remained the political center of the Obersimmental district through the 1798 French invasion and the Act of Mediation in 1803. It remained the capital until the district was dissolved in 2009.

The village St. Mary's Church was probably built in the Early or High Middle Ages. It first appears in the historical record in 1228. It was rebuilt and expanded several times in the 13th to 15th centuries. The murals and stained glass date from the same period. The carved wooden ceiling was added around 1456. An ossuary was built under the church in 1481. In 1528, Bern adopted the new faith of the Protestant Reformation and spread it throughout its territory. Zweisimmen, along with much of the Bernese Oberland, initially resisted the new faith, but were forced to convert in the same year. The church was secularized and used for storage and meetings. In 1866 it became the Blankenburg village school.

During the Middle Ages, Zweisimmen grew into a local center for trade and government. In 1644, the annual fair was moved to Zweisimmen and brought cattle and cheese buyers from Italy and Germany to the municipality. In the 1750s, a trade route from Thun to Montreux was built into Zweisimmen. The Simmental road was built from Saanen into the Simmen valley in 1816–45. The new road brought additional trade and eventually tourists to the municipality. A hotel was built in 1881. The completion of the Spiez-Zweisimmen-Montreux railroad in 1905 opened the villages up to many additional tourists. The hotel became a spa and resort in 1912 and included winter sports in 1920. The municipal tourism industry was devastated by the Great Depression and World War II. However, it began to recover in the 1950s with many new cable cars and ski lifts. Zweisimmen cooperated with the neighboring tourist municipalities of Gstaad, Lenk im Simmental and Adelboden to build extensive ski resorts along with an airfield.

A regional hospital opened in 1908 and today provides a number of jobs. A federal armory operated in the village until 2002. One of the major employers in the municipality is the Center Air Defence facility of RUAG Aviation which maintains and develops air defense systems for the Swiss military.

== Geography ==
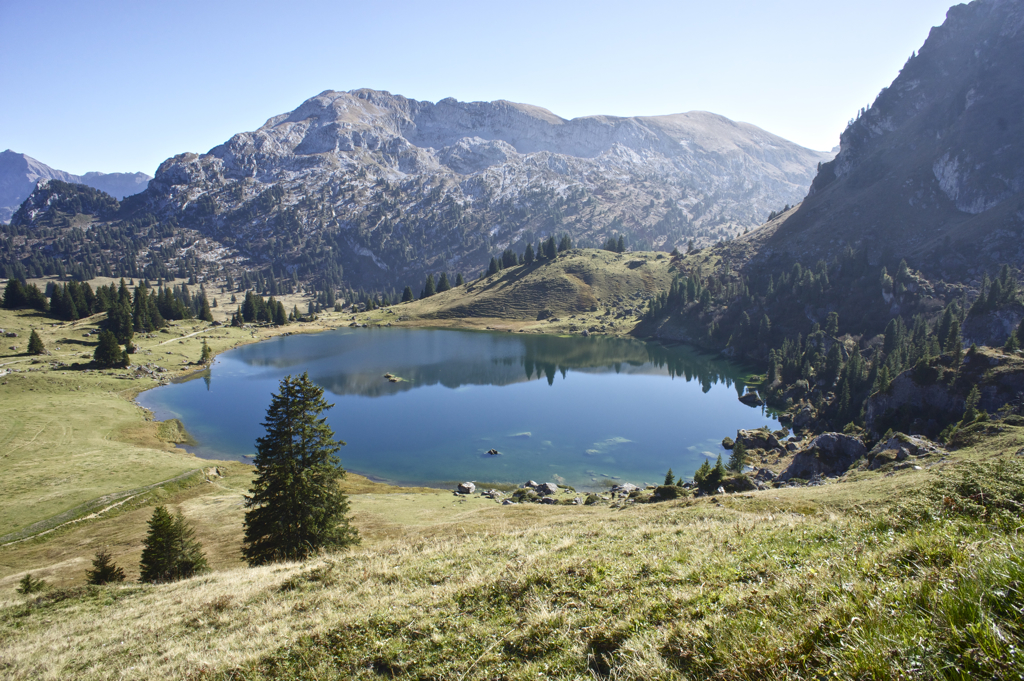
Seehorn Mountain and Seeberg Lake in the eastern side of the municipality, 2010

Aerial view (1957)

Zweisimmen has an area of 73 km^{2} (28.19 sq mi). As of 2012, a total of 40.15 km^{2} (15.50 mi^{2}) or 55.0% is used for agricultural purposes, while 24.64 km^{2} (9.51 mi^{2}) or 33.7% is forested. The rest of the municipality is 2.48 km^{2} (0.96 mi^{2}) or 3.4% is settled (buildings or roads), 0.56 km^{2} (0.22 mi^{2}) or 0.8% is either rivers or lakes and 5.33 km^{2} (2.06 mi^{2}) or 7.3% is unproductive land.

During the same year, housing and buildings made up 1.5% and transportation infrastructure made up 1.4%. A total of 27.8% of the total land area is heavily forested and 5.3% is covered with orchards or small clusters of trees. Of the agricultural land, 12.8% is pasturage and 42.2% is used for alpine pastures. All the water in the municipality is flowing water. Of the unproductive areas, 4.5% is unproductive vegetation and 2.8% is too rocky for vegetation.

It is formed from the smaller communities of Blankenburg, Mannried and Oeschseite. Blankenburg with its castle (Blankenburg Castle) is the principal community of Zweisimmen. It is located at the confluence of the Gross and Klein Simme rivers.

On 31 December 2009, Amtsbezirk Obersimmental, of which it was the capital, was dissolved. On the following day, 1 January 2010, it joined the newly created Verwaltungskreis Obersimmental-Saanen.

== Coat of arms ==
The blazon of the municipal coat of arms is Or a Semi Bear rampant couped Sable langued Gules.

== Demographics ==
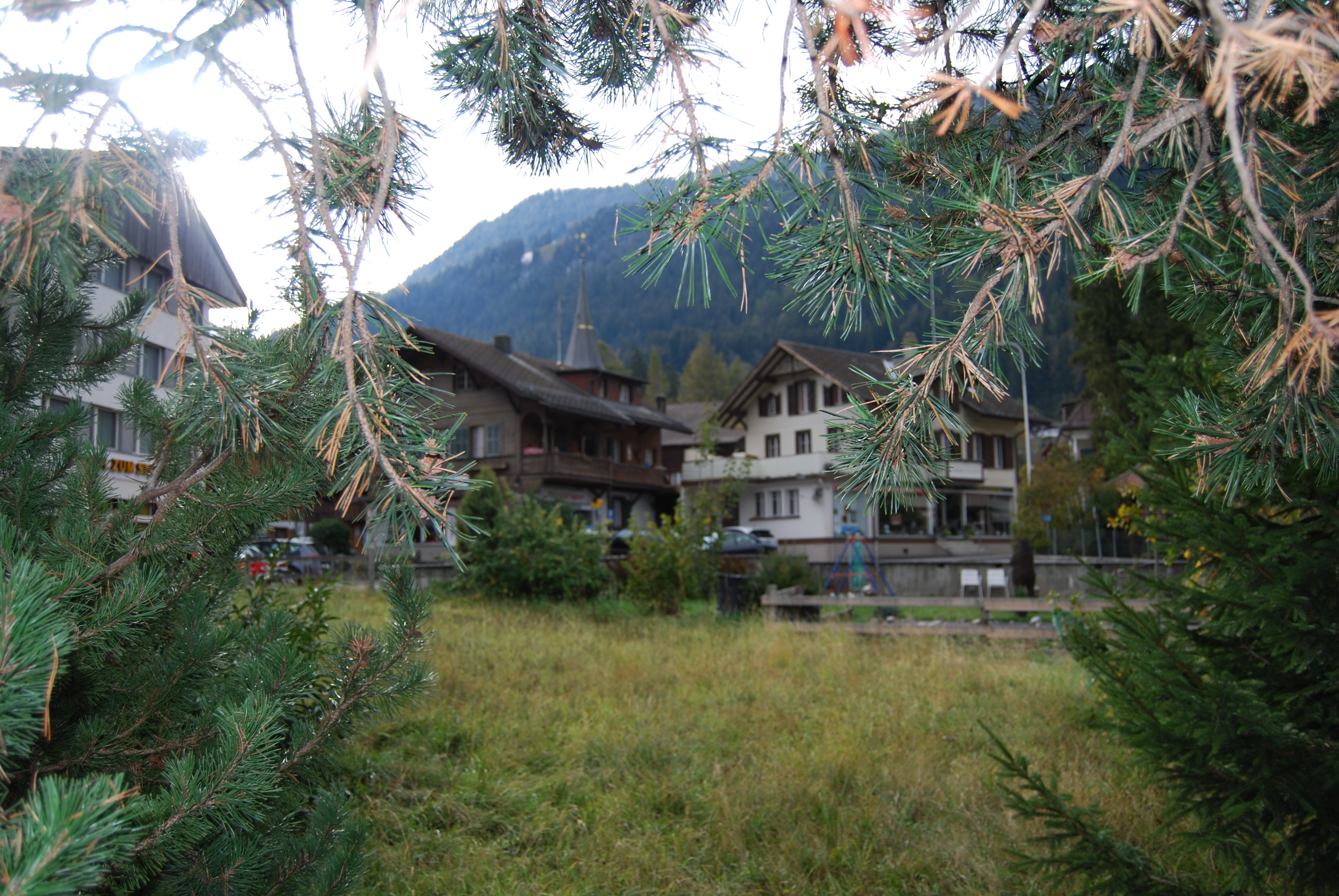
A village in Zweisimmen, 2009

Zweisimmen has a population (as of December 2020) of 3,032. As of 2011, 9.6% of the population are resident foreign nationals. Over the last year (2010–2011) the population has changed at a rate of 0.9%. Migration accounted for 1.6%, while births and deaths accounted for -0.4%.

Most of the population (as of 2000) speaks German (2,813 or 94.7%) as their first language, Albanian is the second most common (36 or 1.2%) and Serbo-Croatian is the third (35 or 1.2%). There are 29 people who speak French, 4 people who speak Italian and 1 person who speaks Romansh.

As of 2008, the population was 48.8% male and 51.2% female. The population was made up of 1,294 Swiss men (44.3% of the population) and 131 (4.5%) non-Swiss men. There were 1,357 Swiss women (46.4%) and 140 (4.8%) non-Swiss women. Of the population in the municipality, 1,139 or about 38.4% were born in Zweisimmen and lived there in 2000. There were 1,099 or 37.0% who were born in the same canton, while 359 or 12.1% were born somewhere else in Switzerland, and 256 or 8.6% were born outside of Switzerland.

As of 2011, children and teenagers (0–19 years old) make up 18.1% of the population, while adults (20–64 years old) make up 58.1% and seniors (over 64 years old) make up 23.8%.

As of 2000, there were 1,112 people who were single and never married in the municipality. There were 1,521 married individuals, 233 widows or widowers and 104 individuals who are divorced.

As of 2010, there were 404 households that consist of only one person and 81 households with five or more people. In 2000, a total of 1,225 apartments (63.8% of the total) were permanently occupied, while 622 apartments (32.4%) were seasonally occupied and 74 apartments (3.9%) were empty. As of 2010, the construction rate of new housing units was 16.4 new units per 1000 residents. In 2011, single family homes made up 37.5% of the total housing in the municipality.

The historical population is given in the following chart:

== Heritage sites of national significance ==
The village church and its rectory, the ruins of Oberer Mannenberg Castle and the ruins of Unterer Mannenberg Castle are listed as Swiss heritage site of national significance.

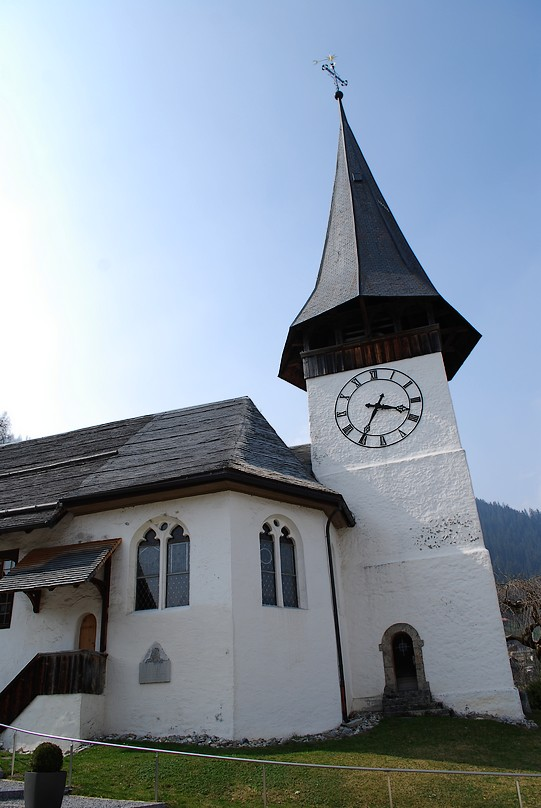
Swiss Reformed Church and Rectory, 2010

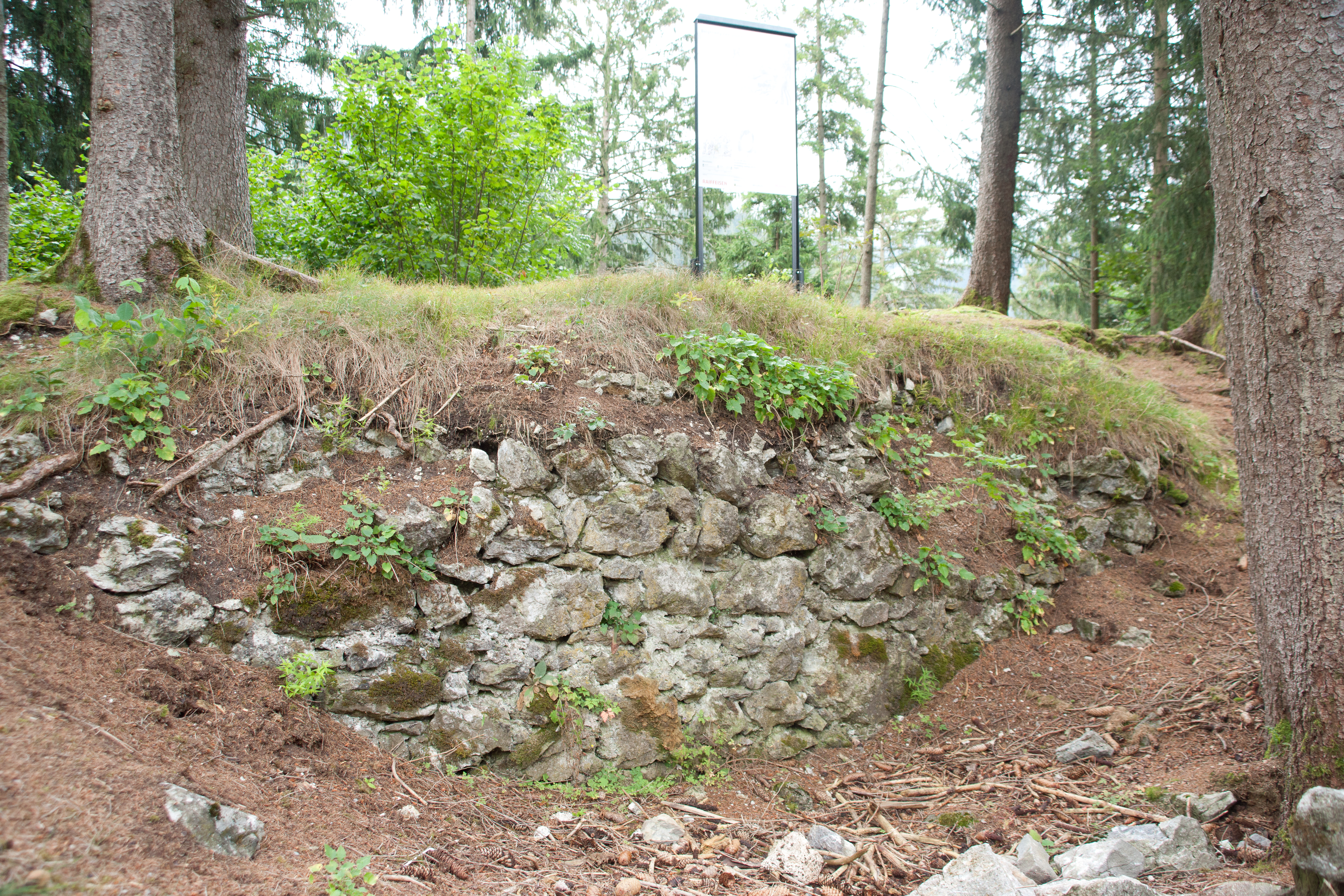
Ruins of Oberer Mannenberg Castle, 2011

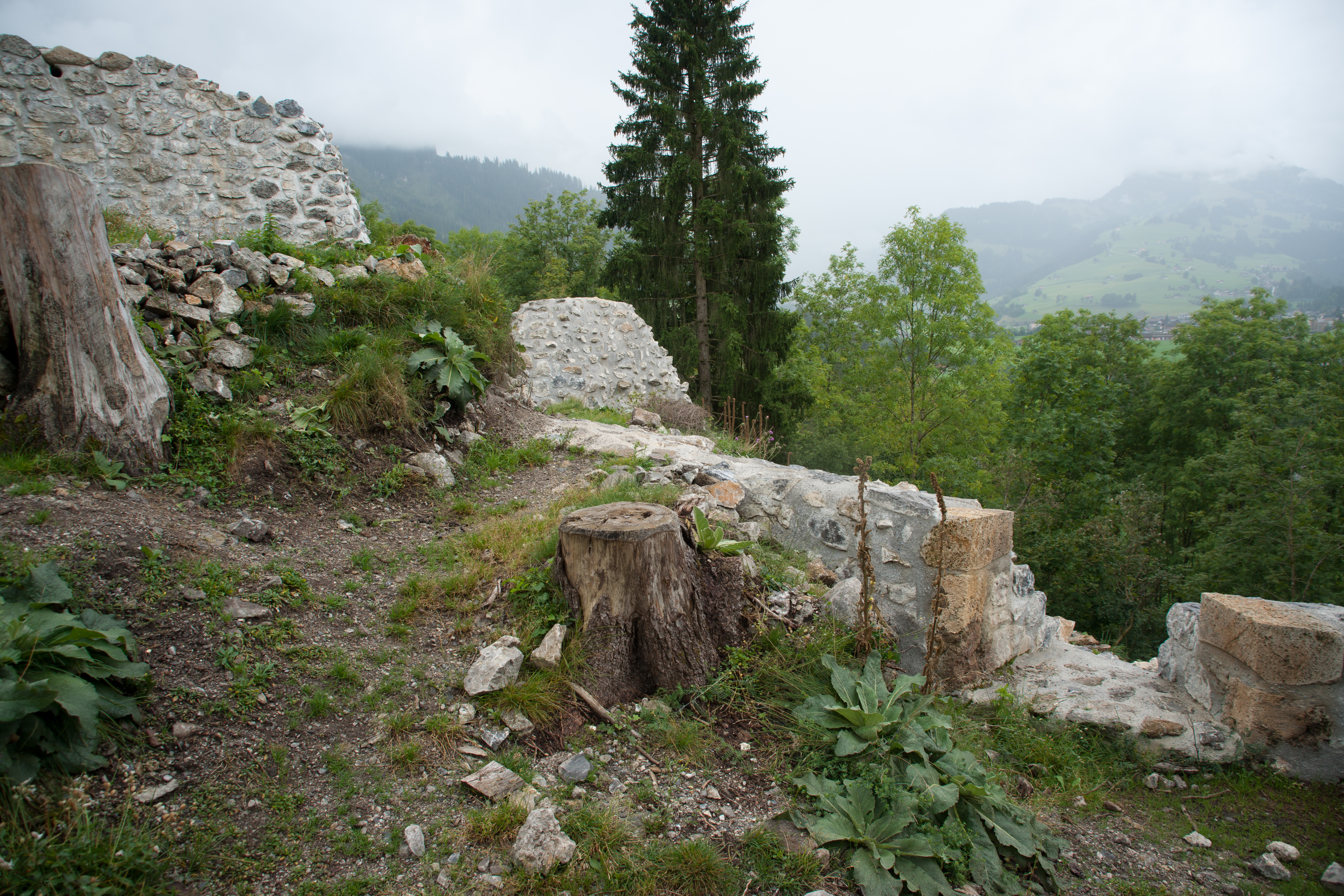
Ruins of Unterer Mannenberg Castle, 2011

== Politics ==
In the 2011 federal election, the most popular party was the Swiss People's Party (SVP) which received 47.7% of the vote. The next three most popular parties were the Conservative Democratic Party (BDP) (18%), the Social Democratic Party (SP) (10.2%) and the FDP.The Liberals (7.6%). In the federal election, a total of 1,269 votes were cast, and the voter turnout was 55.5%.

== Economy ==
As of 2011, Zweisimmen had an unemployment rate of 1.12%. As of 2008, there were a total of 1,558 people employed in the municipality. Of these, there were 255 people employed in the primary economic sector and about 102 businesses involved in this sector. 262 people were employed in the secondary sector and there were 36 businesses in this sector. 1,041 people were employed in the tertiary sector, with 132 businesses in this sector. There were 1,530 residents of the municipality who were employed in some capacity, of which females made up 43.9% of the workforce.

In 2008, there were a total of 1,227 full-time equivalent jobs. The number of jobs in the primary sector was 168, of which 161 were in agriculture, 6 were in forestry or lumber production and 1 was in fishing or fisheries. The number of jobs in the secondary sector was 244 of which 121 or (49.6%) were in manufacturing, 1 was in mining and 111 (45.5%) were in construction. The number of jobs in the tertiary sector was 815. In the tertiary sector; 190 or 23.3% were in wholesale or retail sales or the repair of motor vehicles, 136 or 16.7% were in the movement and storage of goods, 89 or 10.9% were in a hotel or restaurant, 37 or 4.5% were the insurance or financial industry, 43 or 5.3% were technical professionals or scientists, 23 or 2.8% were in education and 219 or 26.9% were in health care.

In 2000, there were 466 workers who commuted into the municipality and 420 workers who commuted away. The municipality is a net importer of workers, with about 1.1 workers entering the municipality for every one leaving. A total of 1,110 workers (70.4% of the 1,576 total workers in the municipality) both lived and worked in Zweisimmen. Of the working population, 8.3% used public transportation to get to work, and 47.3% used a private car.

In 2011, the average local and cantonal tax rate on a married resident, with two children, of Zweisimmen making 150,000 CHF was 13.1%, while an unmarried resident's rate was 19.3%. For comparison, the average rate for the entire canton in the same year, was 14.2% and 22.0%, while the nationwide average was 12.3% and 21.1% respectively.

In 2009, there were a total of 1,295 tax payers in the municipality. Of that total, 334 made over 75,000 CHF per year. There were 17 people who made between 15,000 and 20,000 per year. The greatest number of workers, 373, made between 50,000 and 75,000 CHF per year. The average income of the over 75,000 CHF group in Zweisimmen was 116,602 CHF, while the average across all of Switzerland was 130,478 CHF.

In 2011, a total of 1.5% of the population received direct financial assistance from the government.

== Transport ==
Zweisimmen is at the junction of the narrow gauge Montreux–Lenk im Simmental line and standard gauge BLS railway. There is a rail change of gauge facility, made by Stadler Rail. Passenger carriages have variable gauge bogies, which are altered as they slowly pass over a gauge-adapting ramp, but the locomotives do not and have to be replaced.

== Religion ==
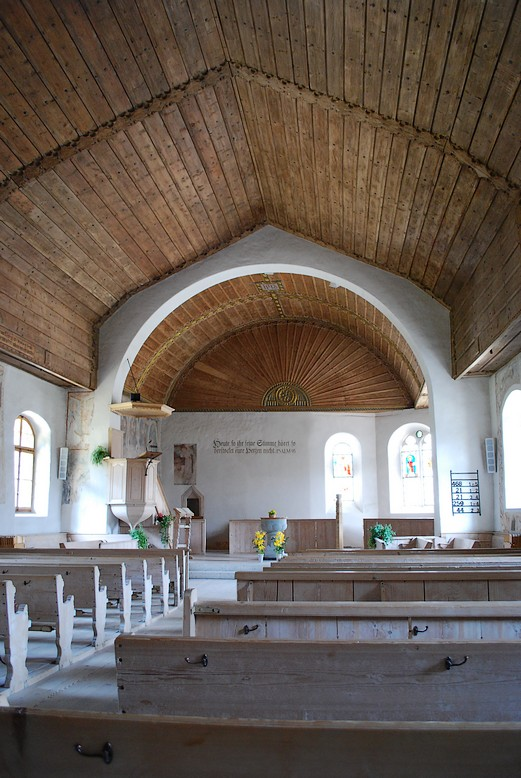
Interior of the Swiss Reformed church in Zweisimmen, 2010

From the 2000 census, 2,354 or 79.3% belonged to the Swiss Reformed Church, while 263 or 8.9% were Roman Catholic. Of the rest of the population, there were 32 members of an Orthodox church (or about 1.08% of the population), there were 6 individuals (or about 0.20% of the population) who belonged to the Christian Catholic Church, and there were 105 individuals (or about 3.54% of the population) who belonged to another Christian church. There were 2 individuals (or about 0.07% of the population) who were Jewish, and 35 (or about 1.18% of the population) who were Muslim. There was 1 person who was Buddhist, 1 person who was Hindu and 1 individual who belonged to another church. 69 (or about 2.32% of the population) belonged to no church, are agnostic or atheist, and 101 individuals (or about 3.40% of the population) did not answer the question.

== Climate ==
Between 1981 and 2010, Zweisimmen had an average of 139.4 days of rain or snow per year and on average received 1,352 mm (53.2 in) of precipitation. The wettest month was July during which time Zweisimmen received an average of 153 mm (6.0 in) of rain or snow. During this month there was precipitation for an average of 13.1 days. The month with the most days of precipitation was June, with an average of 14.3, but with only 140 mm (5.5 in) of rain or snow. The driest month of the year was April with an average of 88 mm (3.5 in) of precipitation over 11.3 days.

== Education ==
In Zweisimmen about 56.9% of the population have completed non-mandatory upper secondary education, and 11.9% have completed additional higher education (either university or a Fachhochschule). Of the 236 who had completed some form of tertiary schooling listed in the census, 62.7% were Swiss men, 23.3% were Swiss women, 6.4% were non-Swiss men and 7.6% were non-Swiss women.

The Canton of Bern school system provides one year of non-obligatory Kindergarten, followed by six years of Primary school. This is followed by three years of obligatory lower Secondary school where the students are separated according to ability and aptitude. Following the lower Secondary students may attend additional schooling or they may enter an apprenticeship.

During the 2011–12 school year, there were a total of 307 students attending classes in Zweisimmen. There were 2 kindergarten classes with a total of 44 students in the municipality. Of the kindergarten students, 13.6% were permanent or temporary residents of Switzerland (not citizens) and 18.2% have a different mother language than the classroom language. The municipality had 8 primary classes and 139 students. Of the primary students, 5.0% were permanent or temporary residents of Switzerland (not citizens) and 3.6% have a different mother language than the classroom language. During the same year, there were 6 lower secondary classes with a total of 124 students. There were 7.3% who were permanent or temporary residents of Switzerland (not citizens) and 1.6% have a different mother language than the classroom language.

As of 2000, there were a total of 385 students attending any school in the municipality. Of those, 322 both lived and attended school in the municipality, while 63 students came from another municipality. During the same year, 34 residents attended schools outside the municipality.

Zweisimmen is home to the Schul- und Gemeindebibliothek Zweisimmen (municipal library of Zweisimmen). The library has (as of 2008) 9,805 books or other media, and loaned out 32,361 items in the same year. It was open a total of 312 days with average of 12 hours per week during that year.
