= First Evangelical Reformed Church =

Historic church in Kentucky, United States

- U.S. National Register of Historic Places
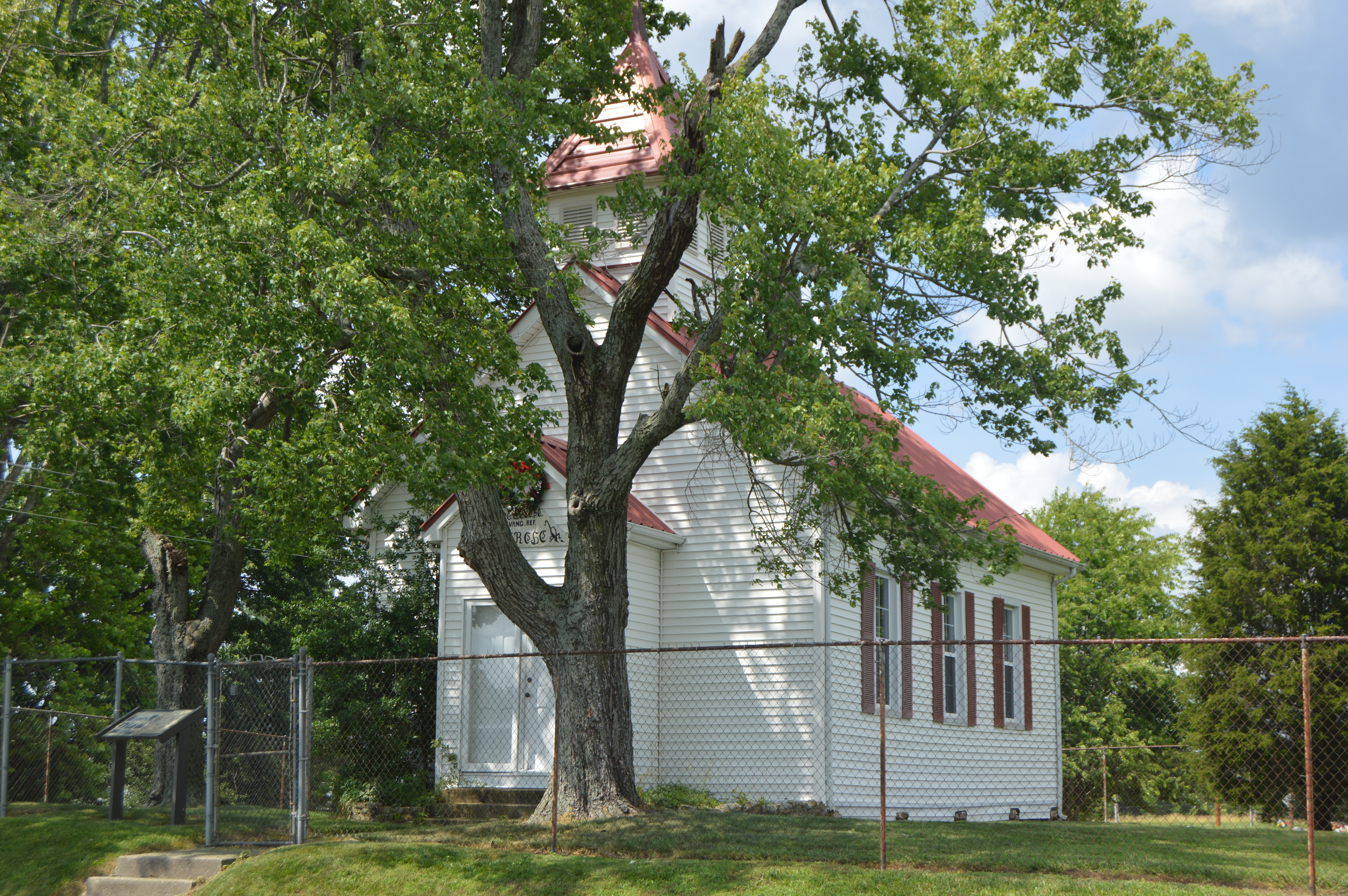
- Front and eastern side

- Location within Kentucky Location within the United States
- Location: KY 80, Bernstadt, Kentucky
- Coordinates: 37°9′25″N 84°11′38″W
- Area: 0.1 acres (0.040 ha)
- Built: 1884
- NRHP reference No.: 80001648
- Added to NRHP: April 22, 1980

The First Evangelical Reformed Church on Kentucky Route 80 in the small community of Bernstadt, Kentucky, is a historic church built in 1884. It has also been known as Swiss Colony Church. It was added to the National Register of Historic Places in 1980.

It was built by Swiss immigrants who were recruited to move from Switzerland to Laurel County, Kentucky, in the late 1800s.

== See also ==
- National Register of Historic Places listings in Kentucky
