= Poynter Building =

- U.S. National Register of Historic Places
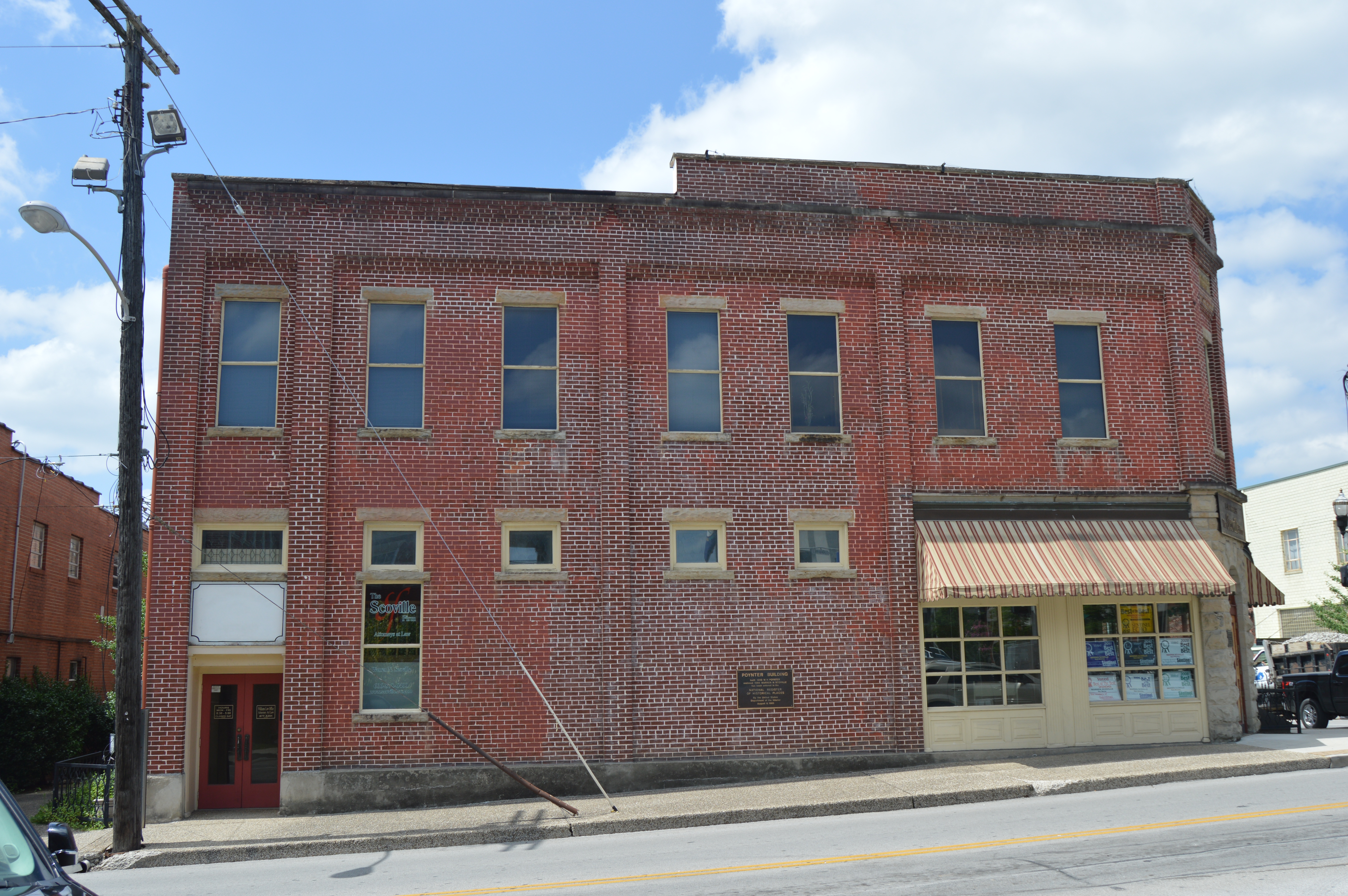
- Location: Main St., London, Kentucky
- Coordinates: 37°07′44″N 84°05′03″W
- Area: less than one acre
- Built: 1910
- NRHP reference No.: 85001745
- Added to NRHP: August 8, 1985

The Poynter Building, on Main St. in London, Kentucky, was built in 1910. It was listed on the National Register of Historic Places in 1985.

It is a two-story common bond brick commercial building placed prominently on a corner in downtown London. It held the first drugstore in London. It was deemed "significant as the best example of turn of the century commercial architecture in London and because of its association with the development of significant modern commercial and communication facilities in London."
