= Blankenburg Castle (Bern) =

Castle in Blankenburg, Switzerland

- Schloss Blankenburg
- Zweisimmen
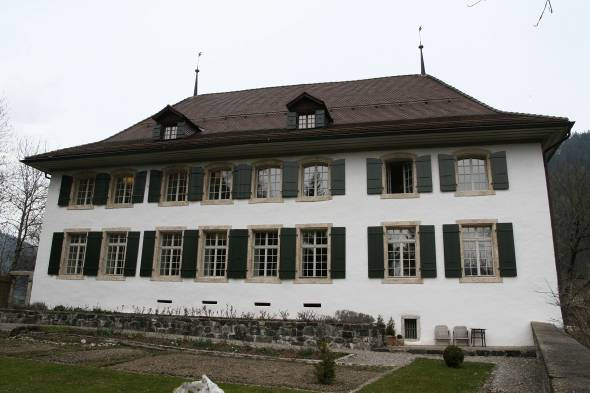
- South side of Blankenburg Castle

Site information
- Owner: Interessengemeinschaft Schloss Blankenburg
- Open to the public: yes

Location
- Coordinates: 46.5397781°N 7.3867936°E

Site history
- Built: c. 1329

Blankenburg Castle (German: Schloss Blankenburg) is a castle and administrative center in the municipality of Zweisimmen in the canton of Bern in Switzerland.

== History ==
Almost nothing is known about who built the castle or when it was originally built. It first appears in the historical record in 1329 in the possession of the Freiherren von Weissenburg. It was then acquired by the Lords of Tüdingen (Duedingen) and in 1356 became the center of their Herrschaft of Mannenberg-Laubegg. In 1378 the Lord of Düdingen sold the lands and castles to Fribourg following an uprising. After the Battle of Sempach in 1386, Bern conquered the Simmen river valley (Simmental) and acquired Zweisimmen. The Bernese bailiff over the upper Simmen valley was installed at Blankenburg Castle. Blankenburg Castle remained the political center of the Obersimmental district through the 1798 French invasion and the Act of Mediation in 1803. It remained the capital until the district was dissolved in 2009.

In 1767 most of the medieval castle burned to the ground. Niklaus Hebler was appointed to rebuild the historic castle. He used the medieval foundation but built an entirely new building. It now forms an L-shaped building with a two-story corps-de-logis or main building, flanked by a single one-story wing. The front of the building is dominated by a double, covered staircase which is similar to the staircase at the Town Hall of Bern. The front of the building has a raised courtyard with a nearby horse barn. The south side of the castle is raised over the surrounding gardens.

Until 1984, the prison cells of Blankenburg Castle also housed inmates convicted of crimes. In 1919, Blankenburg gained national recognition through the prominent inmate Robert Grimm.

Following the administrative reforms in the Canton of Bern at the end of 2009, the castle was no longer needed by the cantonal government or courts. In December 2010 it was announced that the Canton would sell the castle to the Interessengemeinschaft Schloss Blankenburg for 1.25 million CHF. The association converted it into a meeting and reception center and planned to convert the prison cells into a small kitchen and restaurant. The association took over the building from the Canton on 1 January 2012.

== See also ==
- List of castles in Switzerland
