= Bernstadt, Kentucky =

Unincorporated community in Kentucky, United States

- Unincorporated community
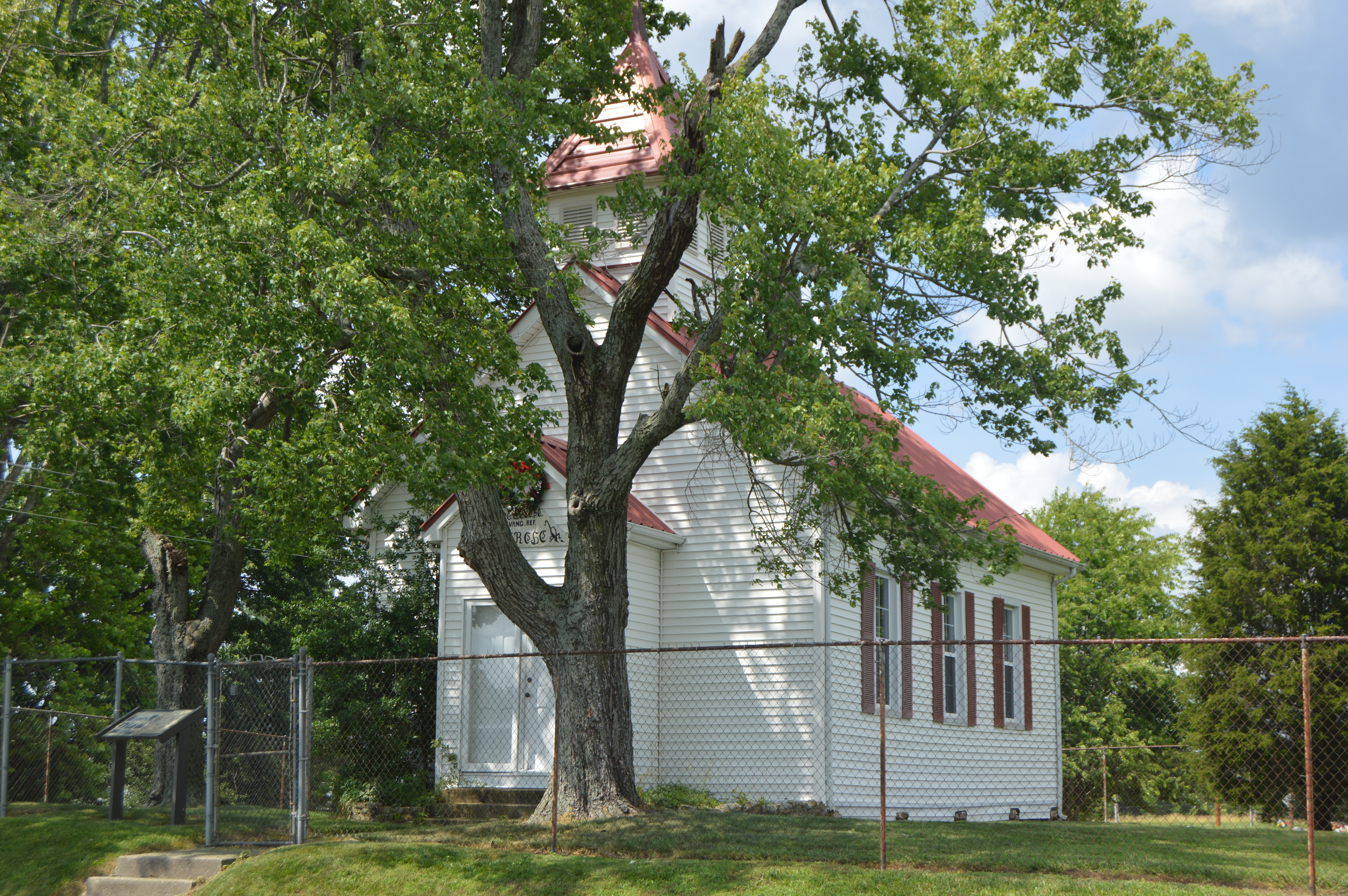
- Former Swiss Colony Church

- Location in Kentucky Location in the United States
- Coordinates: 37°9′22″N 84°11′41″W
- Country: United States
- State: Kentucky
- County: Laurel
- Elevation: 1,280 ft (390 m)
- Time zone: UTC-5 (Eastern (EST))
  - Summer (DST): UTC-4 (EST)
- GNIS feature ID: 510562

Bernstadt is an unincorporated community located in Laurel County, Kentucky, located about 6 miles (9.7 km) west of London, Kentucky, the county seat. It is on Kentucky Route 1956, which exits the national forest here.

== History ==
Its population was estimated to be 400 in 1997 and is the location of the First Evangelical Reformed Church, listed on the National Register of Historic Places.

The community is known for its Swiss population.

On November 14, 2007, an EF0 tornado struck Bernstadt, traveling southwest of Pittsburg.

== Media ==
The Omni Broadcasting Network hosted the OBN affiliate WBON-LD in the community in December 2003.

== Notable person ==
- Carl Im Obersteg, Swiss politician, who founded the community.
