= Matten railway station =

Train station in Switzerland

Matten
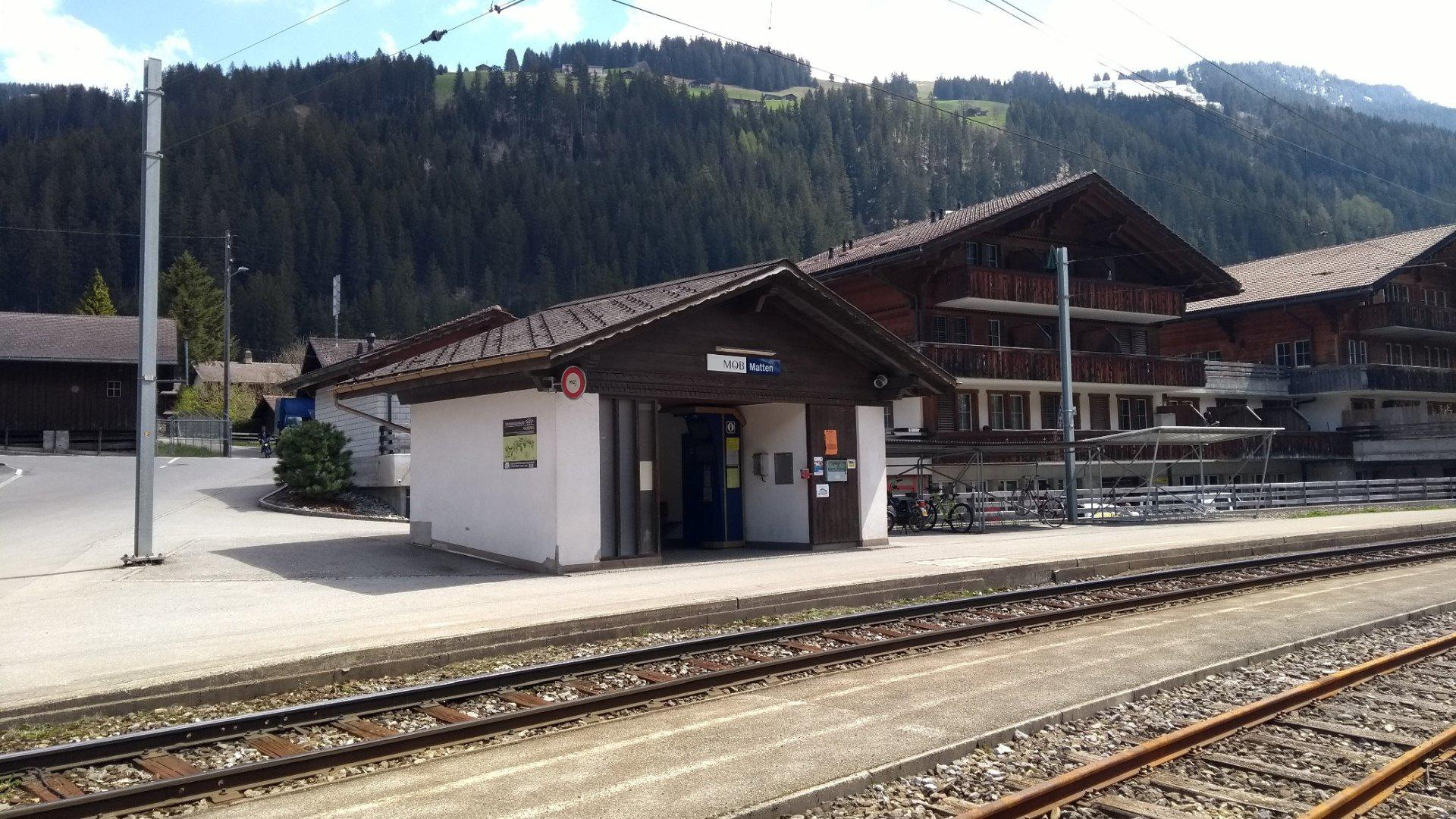
- The station in 2019

General information
- Location: St. Stephan; Switzerland
- Coordinates: 46°29′37″N 7°25′18″E
- Elevation: 1,023 m (3,356 ft)
- Owner: Montreux Oberland Bernois Railway
- Line: Montreux–Lenk im Simmental line
- Distance: 70.9 km (44.1 mi) from Montreux
- Train operators: Montreux Oberland Bernois Railway

Other information
- Fare zone: 844 (Libero)

Services
Preceding station	Montreux Oberland Bernois Railway	Following station
St. Stephan towards Zweisimmen	R31	Boden towards Lenk im Simmental
St. Stephan towards Zweisimmen or Gstaad	R32	Boden towards Lenk im Simmental
Location
- Location within Switzerland Location within Canton of Bern

Matten railway station (German: Bahnhof Matten) is a railway station in the municipality of St. Stephan, in the Swiss canton of Bern. It is an intermediate stop on the 1,000 mm (3 ft 3 3/8 in) Montreux–Lenk im Simmental line of the Montreux Oberland Bernois Railway.

== Services ==
The following services stop at Matten:

- Regio: hourly service between Zweisimmen and Lenk im Simmental.
