= St. Stephan railway station =

Train station in Switzerland

St. Stephan
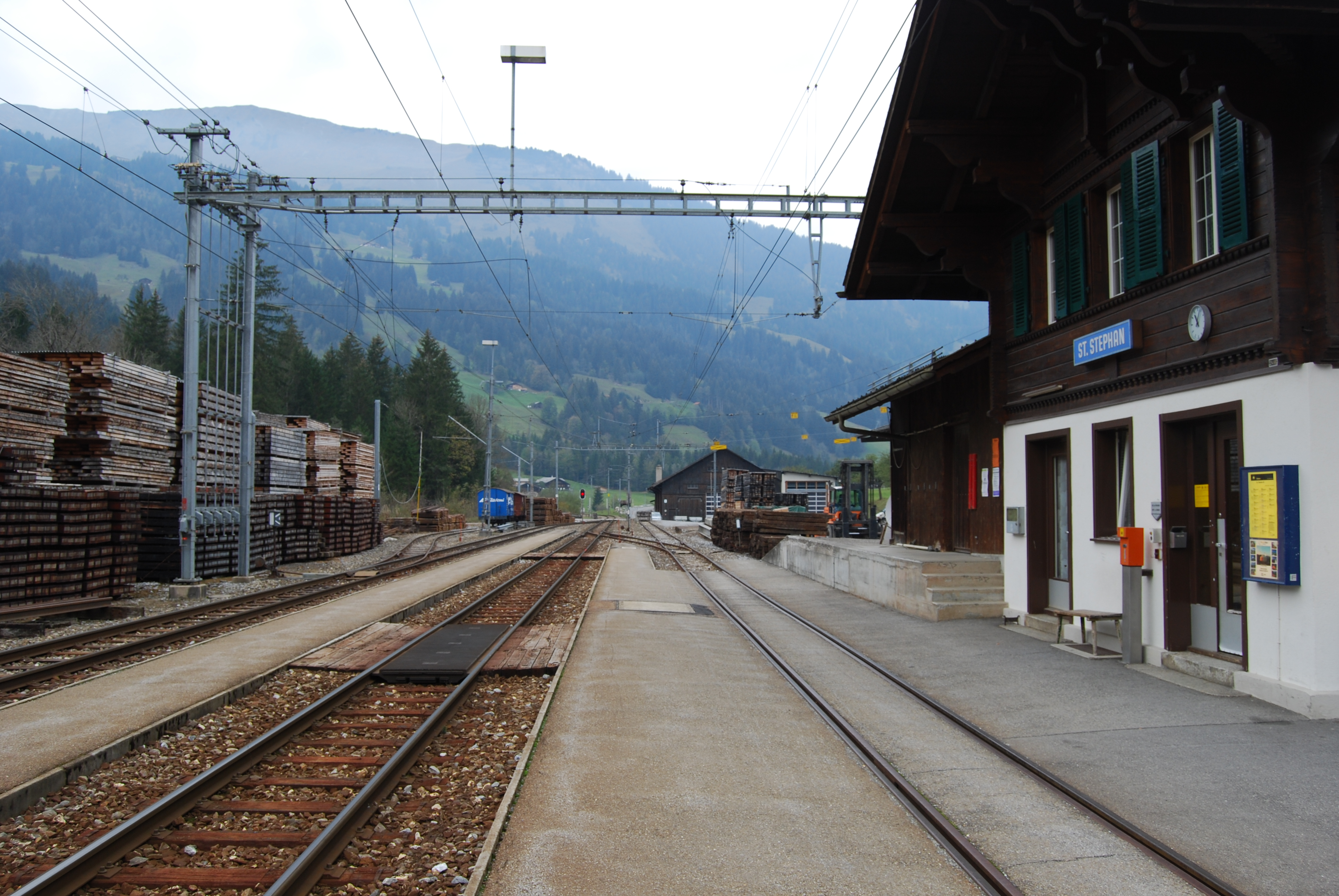
- The station in 2009

General information
- Location: St. Stephan; Switzerland
- Coordinates: 46°30′18″N 7°24′02″E
- Elevation: 993 m (3,258 ft)
- Owner: Montreux Oberland Bernois Railway
- Line: Montreux–Lenk im Simmental line
- Distance: 68.8 km (42.8 mi) from Montreux
- Train operators: Montreux Oberland Bernois Railway
- Connections: Seasonal Autoverkehr Frutigen-Adelboden buses

Other information
- Fare zone: 844 (Libero)

Services
Preceding station	Montreux Oberland Bernois Railway	Following station
Stöckli towards Zweisimmen	R31	Matten towards Lenk im Simmental
Stöckli towards Zweisimmen or Gstaad	R32	Matten towards Lenk im Simmental
Location
- Location within Switzerland Location within Canton of Bern

St. Stephan railway station (German: Bahnhof St. Stephan) is a railway station in the municipality of St. Stephan, in the Swiss canton of Bern. It is an intermediate stop on the 1,000 mm (3 ft 3 3/8 in) Montreux–Lenk im Simmental line of the Montreux Oberland Bernois Railway.

== Services ==
The following services stop at St. Stephan:

- Regio: hourly service between Zweisimmen and Lenk im Simmental.

During the ski season there is a connecting bus to the Lengebrand–Parwengesattel chairlift to the Rinderberg.
