= Stöckli railway station =

Train station in Switzerland

Stöckli
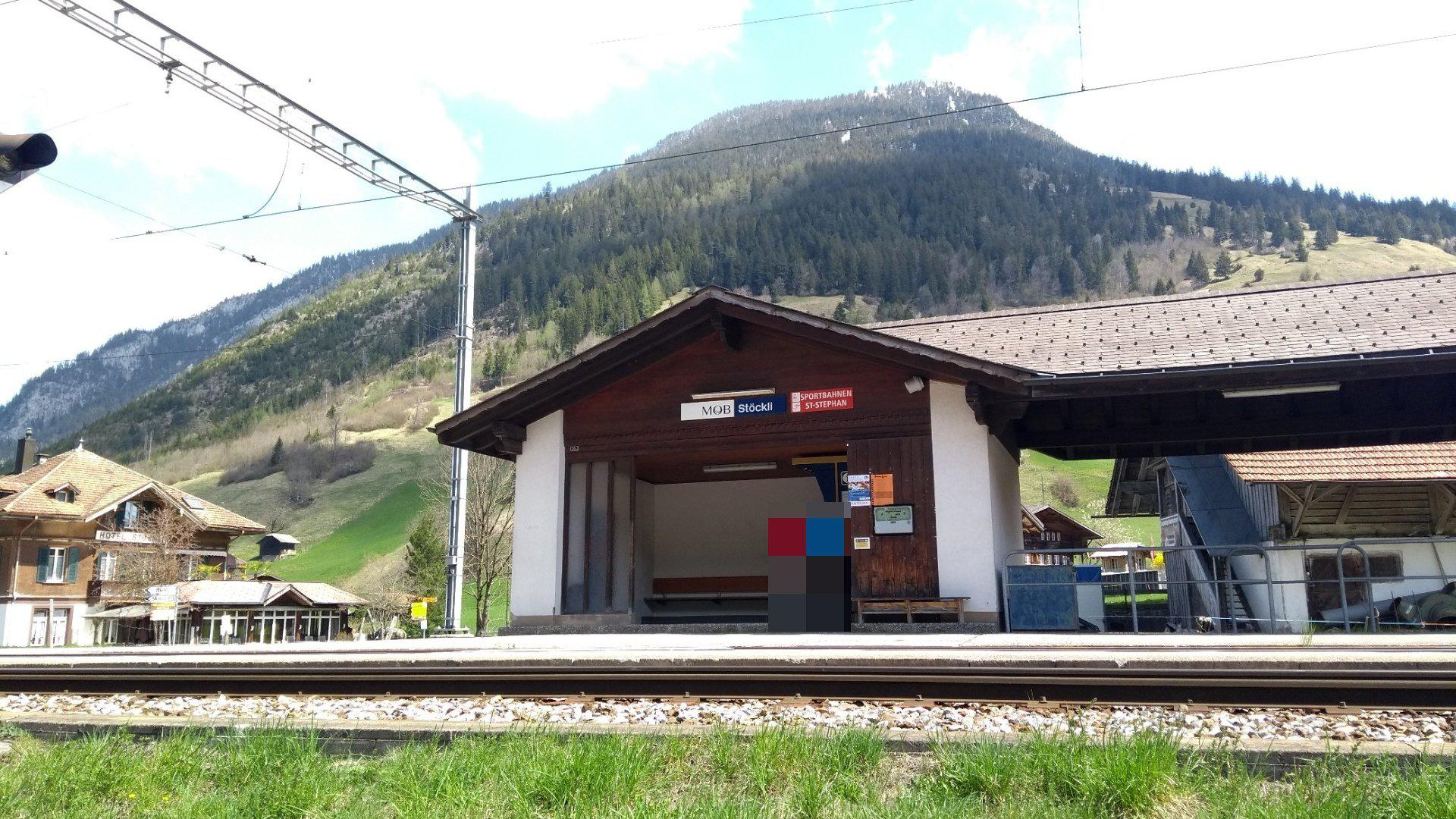
- The station platform in 2019

General information
- Location: St. Stephan; Switzerland
- Coordinates: 46°31′01″N 7°23′18″E
- Elevation: 967 m (3,173 ft)
- Owner: Montreux Oberland Bernois Railway
- Line: Montreux–Lenk im Simmental line
- Distance: 67.0 km (41.6 mi) from Montreux
- Train operators: Montreux Oberland Bernois Railway

Other information
- Fare zone: 844 (Libero)

Services
Preceding station	Montreux Oberland Bernois Railway	Following station
Blankenburg towards Zweisimmen	R31	St. Stephan towards Lenk im Simmental
Blankenburg towards Zweisimmen or Gstaad	R32	St. Stephan towards Lenk im Simmental
Location
- Location within Switzerland Location within Canton of Bern

Stöckli railway station (German: Bahnhof Stöckli) is a railway station in St. Stephan, Switzerland. It is an intermediate stop on the 1,000 mm (3 ft 3 3/8 in) Montreux–Lenk im Simmental line of the Montreux Oberland Bernois Railway.

== Services ==
The following services stop at Stöckli:

- Regio: hourly service between Zweisimmen and Lenk im Simmental.
