= Saanenmöser railway station =

Railway station in Saanen, Switzerland

Saanenmöser
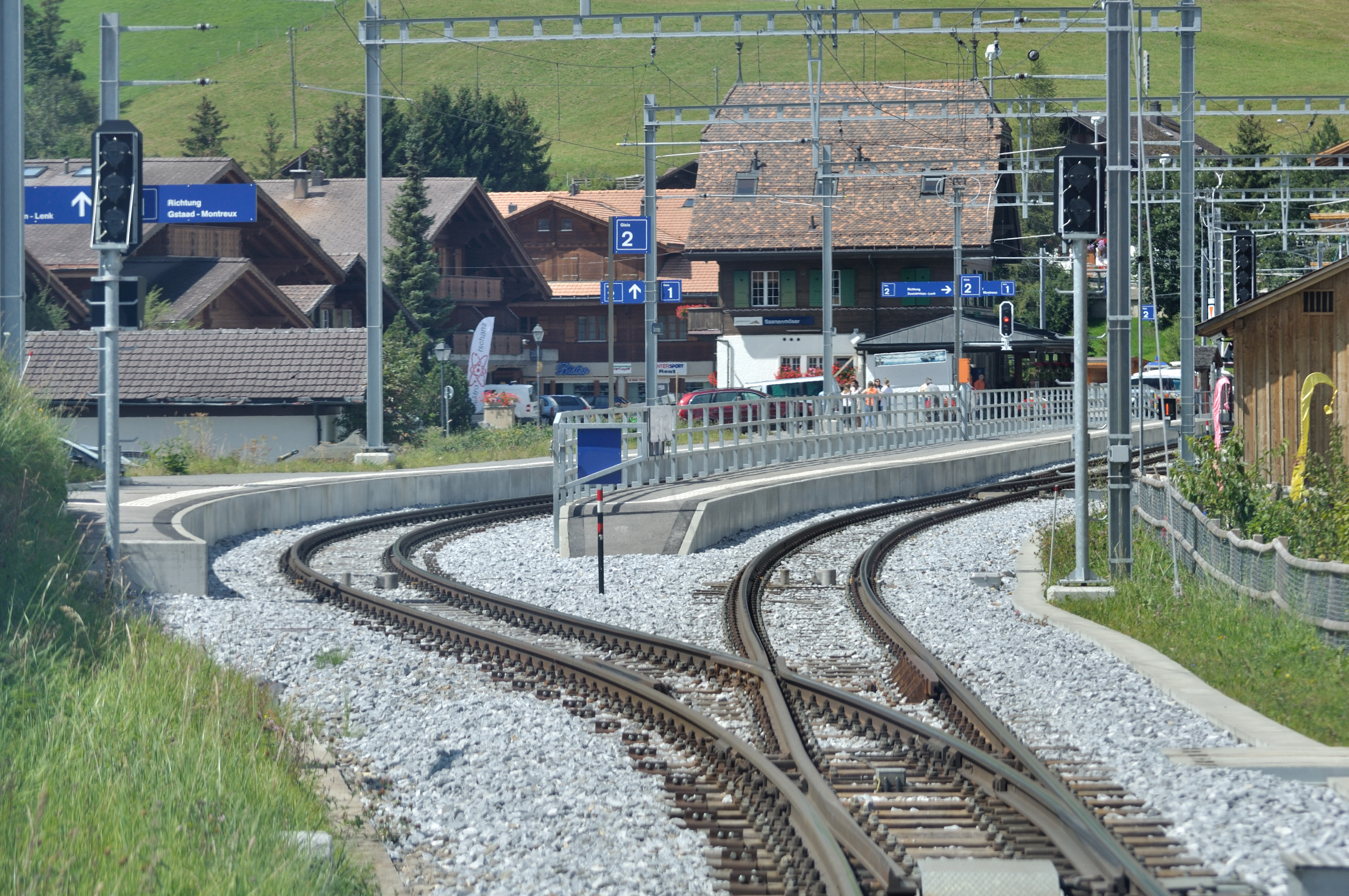
- The station in 2012

General information
- Location: Bahnhofstrasse, Saanenmöser; Saanen; Switzerland
- Coordinates: 46°31′03″N 7°18′42″E
- Elevation: 1,271 m (4,170 ft)
- Owner: Montreux Oberland Bernois Railway
- Line: Montreux–Lenk im Simmental line
- Distance: 53.1 km (33.0 mi) from Montreux
- Platforms: 2 side platforms
- Tracks: 3
- Train operators: MOB
- Connections: PostAuto AG bus service

Construction
- Accessible: Yes

Other information
- Station code: 8507272 (SAMO)
- Fare zone: 845 (Libero)

History
- Opened: 6 July 1905

Passengers
- 2024: 440 per weekday (MOB)

Services
Preceding station	Montreux Oberland Bernois Railway	Following station
Schönried towards Montreux	GoldenPass Express	Zweisimmen towards Interlaken Ost
Schönried towards Montreux	PE30	Oeschseite towards Zweisimmen
Schönried towards Gstaad	R32	Zweisimmen towards Lenk im Simmental
Schönried towards Gstaad	R32	Zweisimmen Terminus
Location

Saanenmöser railway station (German: Bahnhof Saanenmöser) is a railway station in the municipality of Saanen at the Saanenmöser Pass in the Swiss canton of Bern. It is an intermediate stop on the 1,000 mm (3 ft 3 3/8 in) metre gauge Montreux–Lenk im Simmental line of Montreux Oberland Bernois Railway. At 1,271 m (4,170 ft), it is the highest station on the line. An aerial cablecar at the station leads to Saanenwald-Saanerslochgrat.

== Services ==
As of the December 2024 timetable change, the following services stop at Saanenmöser:

- GoldenPass Express: 4 daily round-trips between Montreux and Interlaken Ost.
- Panorama Express: hourly service between Montreux and Zweisimmen.
- Regio: service between Gstaad and Zweisimmen or Lenk im Simmental.

== Gallery ==
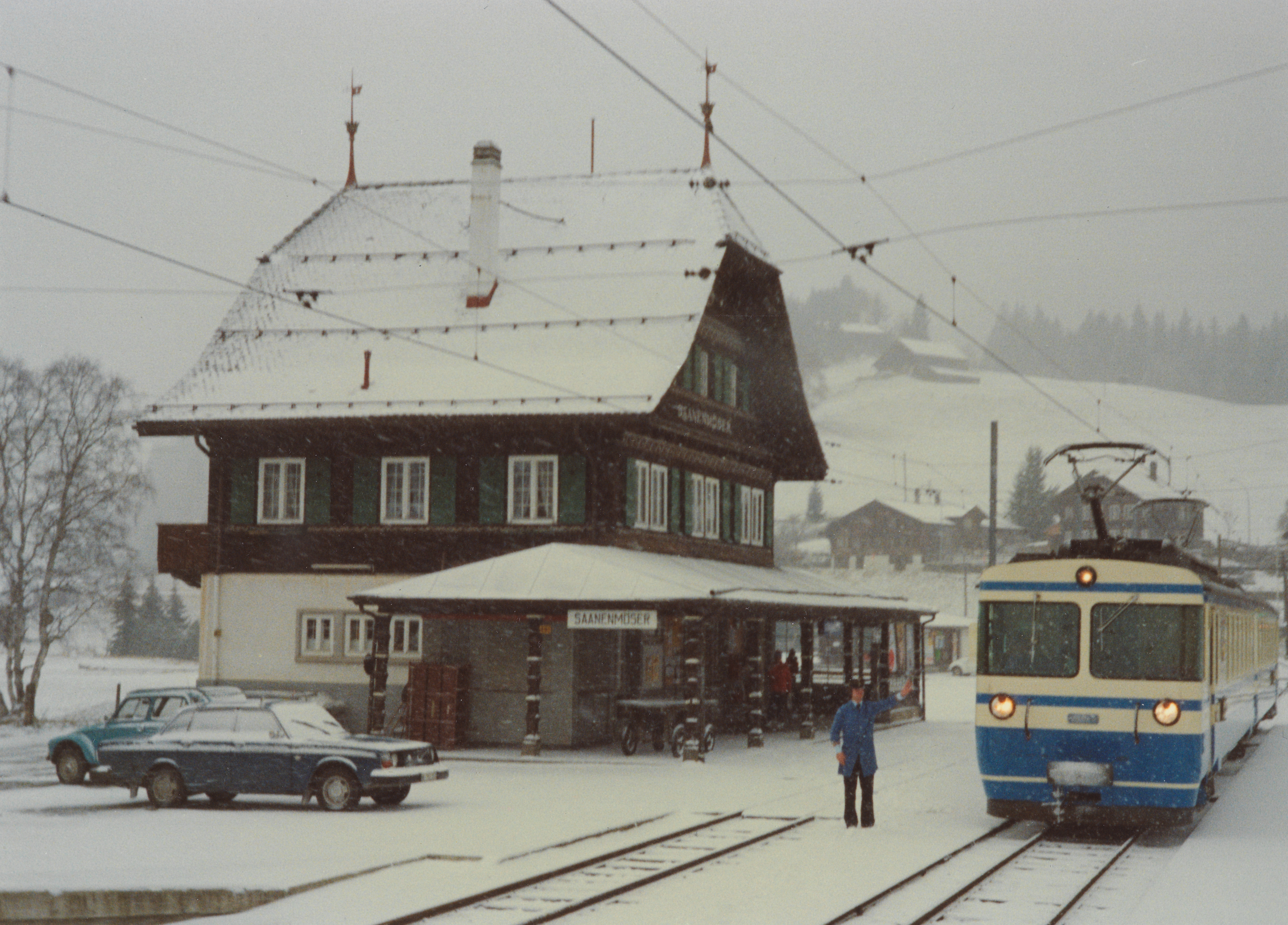
station in winter (ca. 1980)

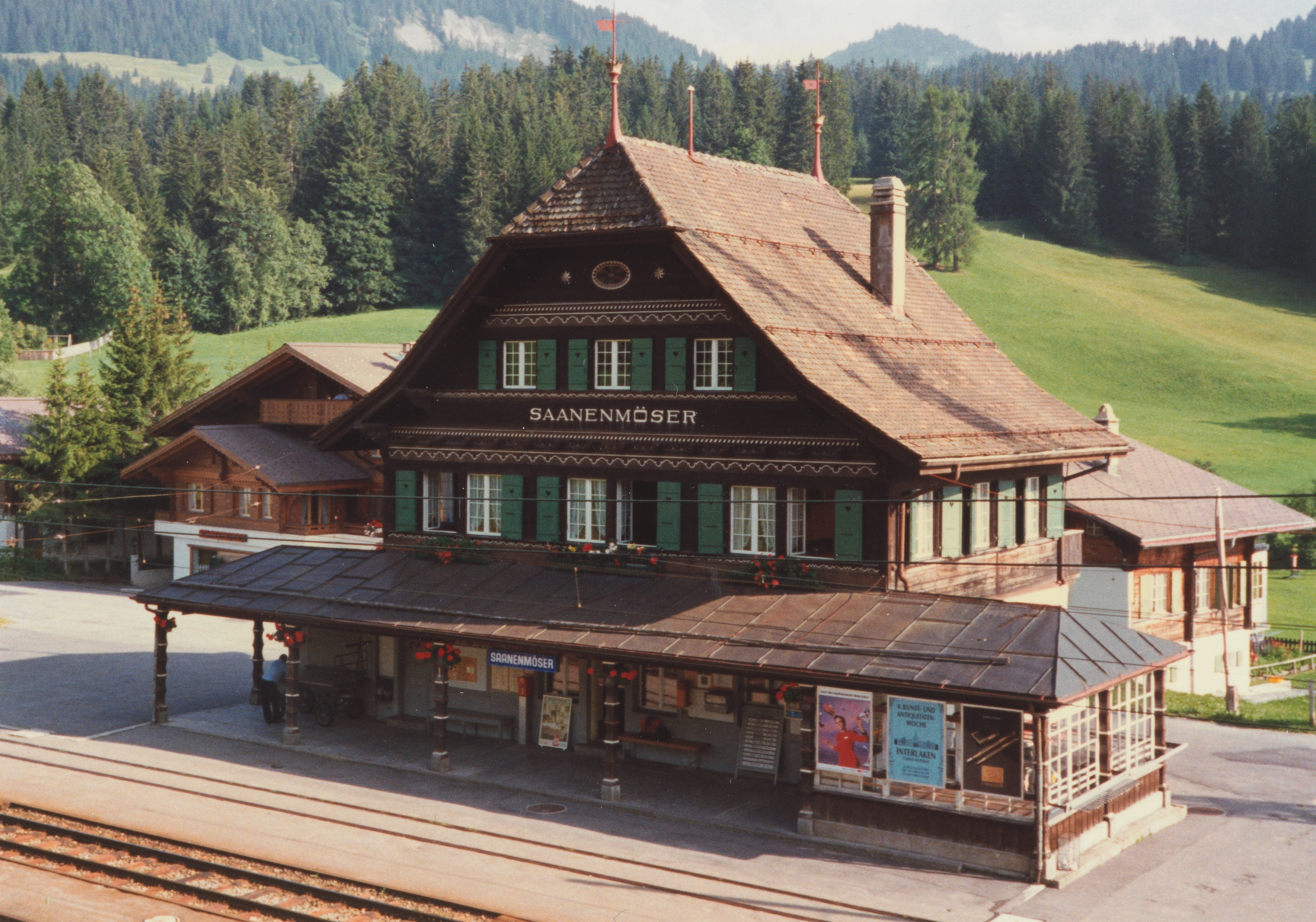
station building (1988)
