= Boden railway station =

Train station in Switzerland

Boden
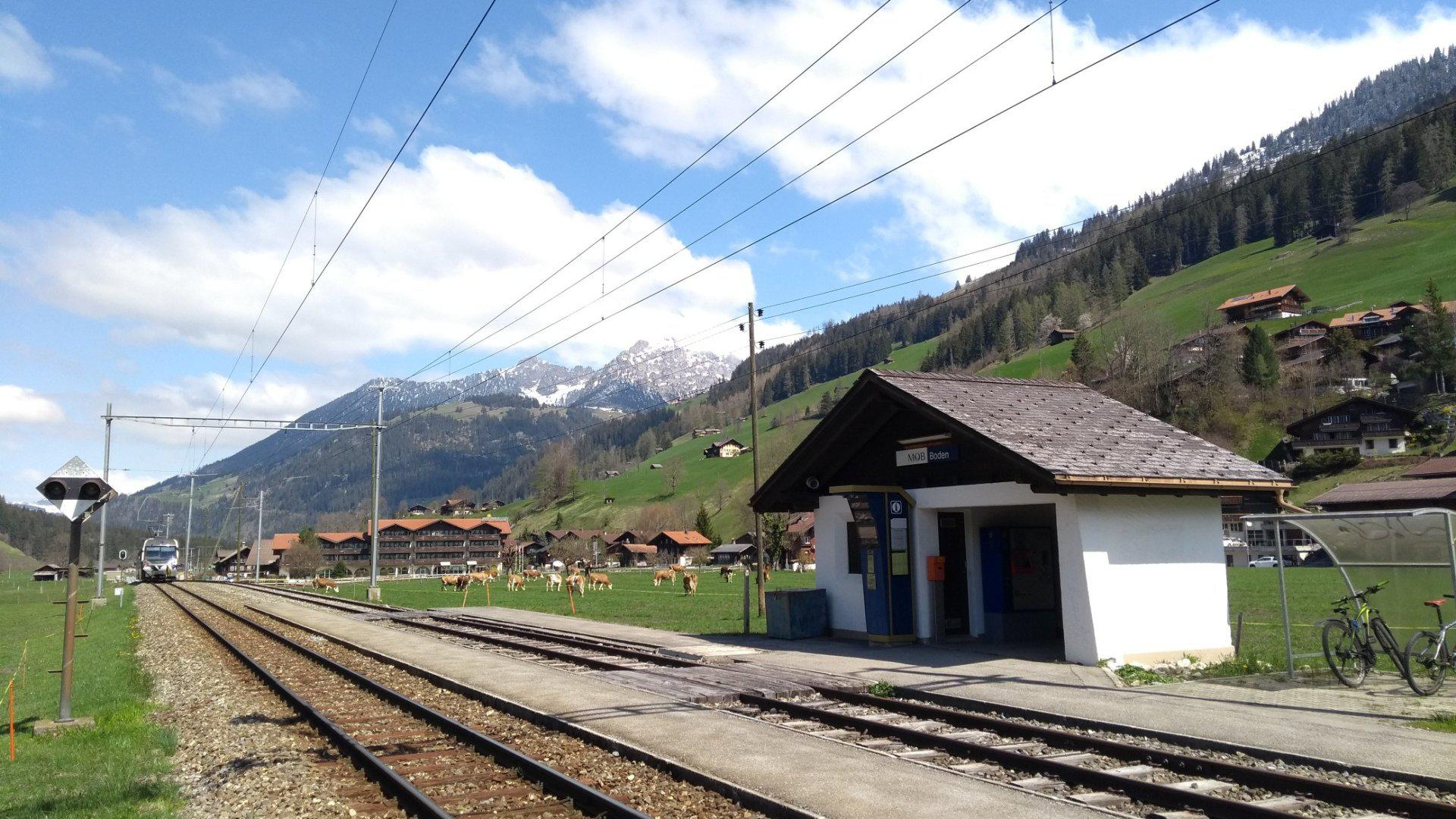
- The station in 2019

General information
- Location: Lenk im Simmental; Switzerland
- Coordinates: 46°28′15″N 7°26′07″E
- Elevation: 1,036 m (3,399 ft)
- Owner: Montreux Oberland Bernois Railway
- Line: Montreux–Lenk im Simmental line
- Distance: 73.7 km (45.8 mi) from Montreux
- Train operators: Montreux Oberland Bernois Railway

Other information
- Fare zone: 844 (Libero)

Services
Preceding station	Montreux Oberland Bernois Railway	Following station
Matten towards Zweisimmen	R31	Lenk im Simmental Terminus
Matten towards Zweisimmen or Gstaad	R32	Lenk im Simmental Terminus
Location
- Location within Switzerland Location within Canton of Bern

Boden railway station (German: Bahnhof Boden) is a railway station in the municipality of Lenk im Simmental, in the Swiss canton of Bern. It is an intermediate stop on the 1,000 mm (3 ft 3 3/8 in) Montreux–Lenk im Simmental line of the Montreux Oberland Bernois Railway.

== Services ==
The following services stop at Boden:

- Regio: hourly service between Zweisimmen and Lenk im Simmental.
