= Saanenmöser Pass =

Mountain pass in the Bernese Oberland

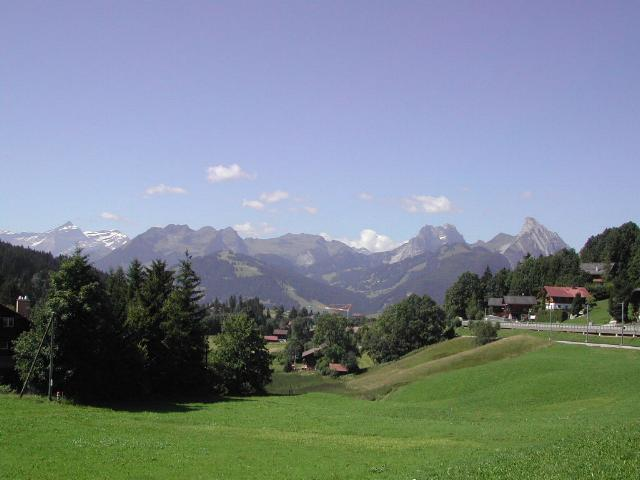
- Saanenmöser Pass

- Location within Switzerland
- Elevation: 1,279 metres (4,196 ft)
- Traversed by: Road, rail

Third Approach
- Location: Bern, Switzerland
- Range: Alps
- Coordinates: 46°30′45″N 07°16′08″E

Saanenmöser (el. 1279 m.) is a high mountain pass in the Bernese Oberland in the Alps in Switzerland.

It connects Zweisimmen and Saanen.

The Montreux–Lenk im Simmental line also crosses the pass. It is the highest point on the line. Saanenmöser railway station is nearby.

== See also ==
- List of highest paved roads in Europe
- List of mountain passes
- List of the highest Swiss passes
