= Lenk im Simmental railway station =

Train station in Switzerland

Lenk im Simmental
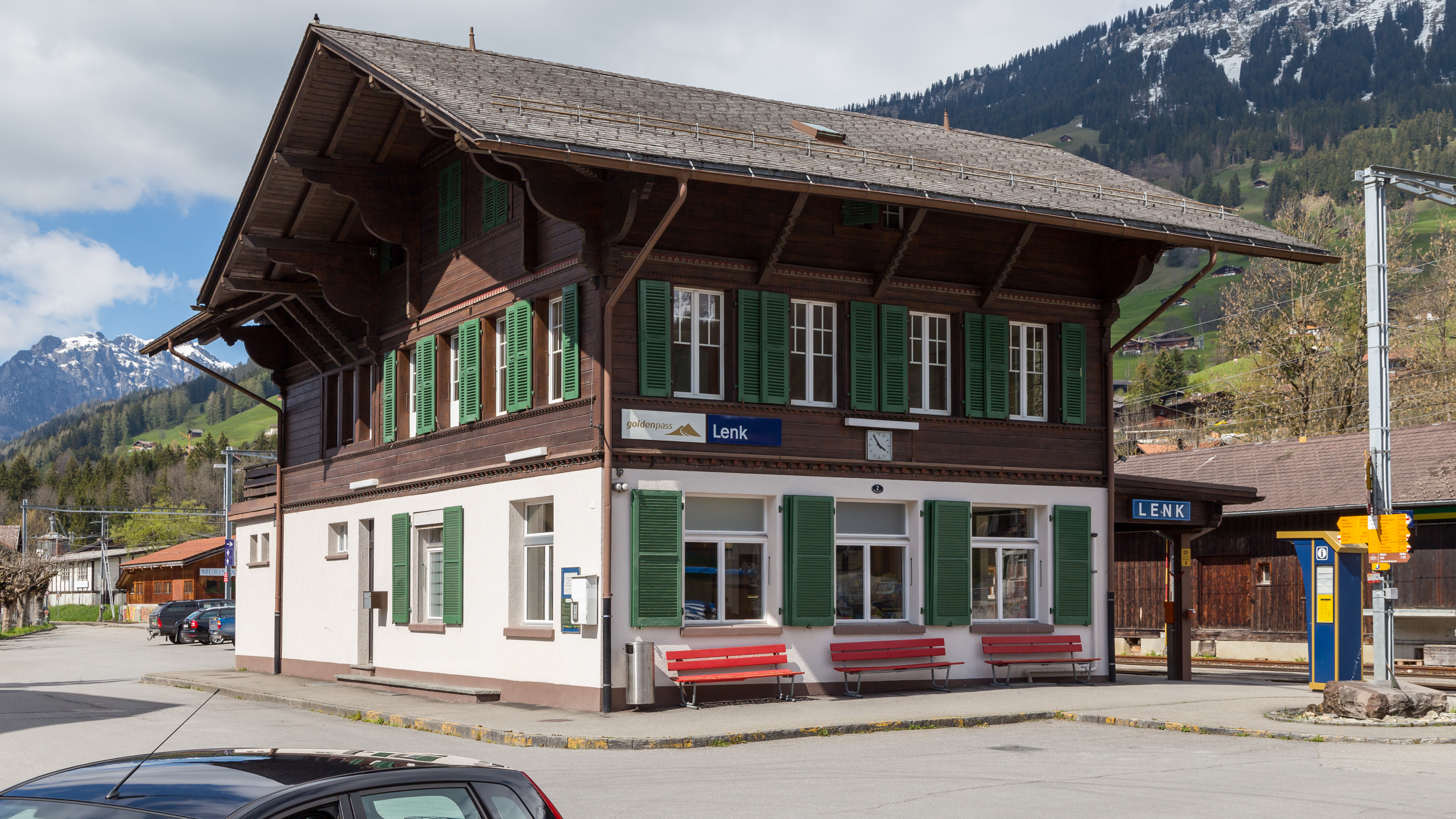
- The station building in 2014

General information
- Location: Lenk im Simmental; Switzerland
- Coordinates: 46°27′31″N 7°26′37″E
- Elevation: 1,068 m (3,504 ft)
- Owner: Montreux Oberland Bernois Railway
- Line: Montreux–Lenk im Simmental line
- Distance: 75.3 km (46.8 mi) from Montreux
- Train operators: Montreux Oberland Bernois Railway
- Connections: Autoverkehr Frutigen-Adelboden buses

Other information
- Fare zone: 844 (Libero)

Services
Preceding station	Montreux Oberland Bernois Railway	Following station
Boden towards Zweisimmen	R31	Terminus
Boden towards Zweisimmen or Gstaad	R32	Terminus
Location
- Location within Switzerland Location within Canton of Bern

Lenk im Simmental railway station (German: Bahnhof Lenk im Simmental) is a railway station in the municipality of Lenk im Simmental, in the Swiss canton of Bern. It is the eastern terminus of the 1,000 mm (3 ft 3 3/8 in) Montreux–Lenk im Simmental line of the Montreux Oberland Bernois Railway.

== Services ==
The following services stop at Lenk im Simmental:

- Regio: hourly service to Zweisimmen.
