= Montreux Oberland Bernois Railway =

Railway company in Switzerland

Coordinates: 46°26′8″N 6°54′40″E

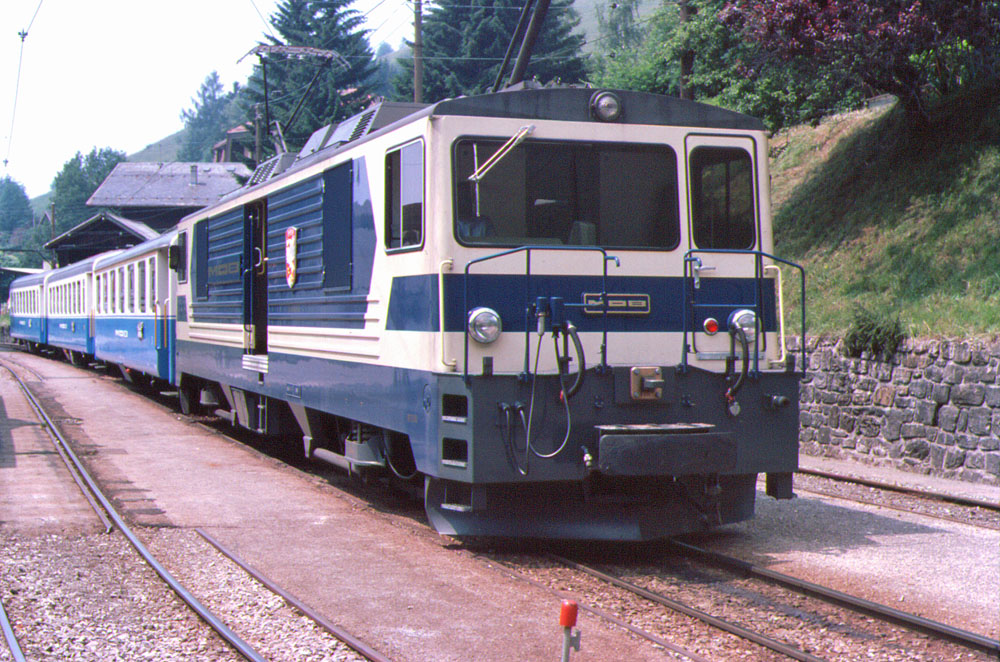
- MOB train at Les Avants on 11 July 1985.

Overview
- Native name: Chemin de fer Montreux Oberland Bernois
- Status: operating hourly services
- Locale: Vaud, Bernese Highlands
- Termini: Montreux; Lenk i.S.
- Stations: 36
- Website: www.mob.ch

Service
- Services: 1

History
- Opened: 1899; 127 years ago

Technical
- Line length: 75.03 km (46.62 mi)
- Number of tracks: 1
- Character: commuter and touristic services
- Rack system: None
- Track gauge: 1,000 mm (3 ft 3 3/8 in) metre gauge
- Electrification: 900 V DC Overhead line
- Highest elevation: 1,275 m (4,183 ft)
- Maximum incline: 73‰

The Montreux Oberland Bernois Railway (French: Chemin de fer Montreux Oberland Bernois, German: Montreux Berner Oberland Bahn, abbreviated MOB) is a company that operates an electrified railway line, the Montreux–Lenk im Simmental line, in southwest Switzerland, one of the oldest electric railways in the country. Its main line, 62.4 km (38.8 mi) in length, is built to the 1,000 mm (3 ft 3 3/8 in) gauge. It connects Montreux, Gstaad, and Zweisimmen. At Zweisimmen, passengers may transfer to the Zweisimmen to Spiez line — a standard gauge line owned by BLS AG. A 12.9 km (8.0 mi) branch-line also connects Zweisimmen to Lenk.

== History and route ==
The main line of the MOB was opened in stages, the first, from Montreux to Les Avants (10.9 km or 6.8 mi) on 17 December 1901, followed by the Les Avants to Montbovon (11.2 km or 7.0 mi) section on 1 October 1903. The next stages from Montbovon to Château-d'Œx (10.6 km or 6.6 mi) and then Gstaad (13.1 km or 8.1 mi) followed on 19 August 1904 and 20 December 1904 respectively, the final 16.6 km (10.3 mi) of the line reaching Zweisimmen on 6 July 1905. The spur line to Lenk was opened in 1912.

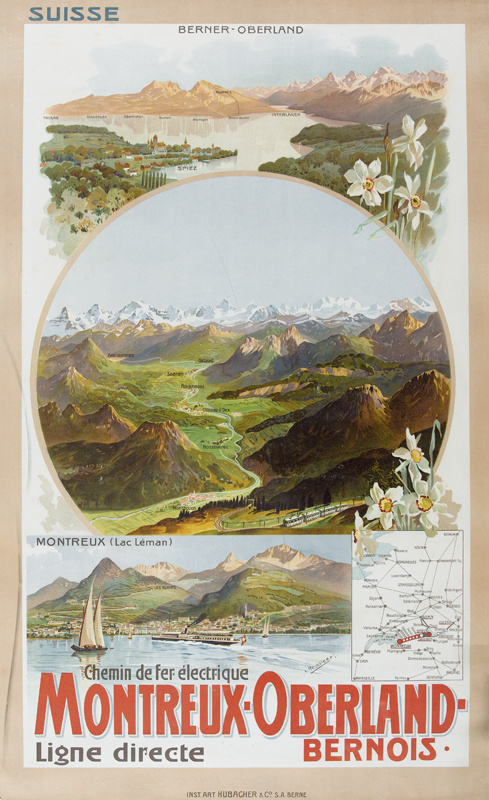
1930s poster

From the very start, the MOB had the character of a mainline railway and, at an early stage, through trains with dining and saloon coaches were introduced. The creation of the Golden Mountain Pullman Express in 1931 was unfortunately at a time of world economic crisis and this accounted for its lack of success. The saloon coaches 103–106 built for this train by Compagnie Internationale des Wagons-Lits (CIWL) were sold to the Rhaetian Railway in 1939, where they are still in use (As 1141–44). Two of the original (1913–14 built) coaches have been restored by the MOB and are used for Chocolate train services in the summer months, but still regularly find work on the main line "Classic train" services on Sundays throughout the year. The modern successor of this luxury train is the Golden Pass Panoramic Express, which for the past few years has aroused growing enthusiasm.

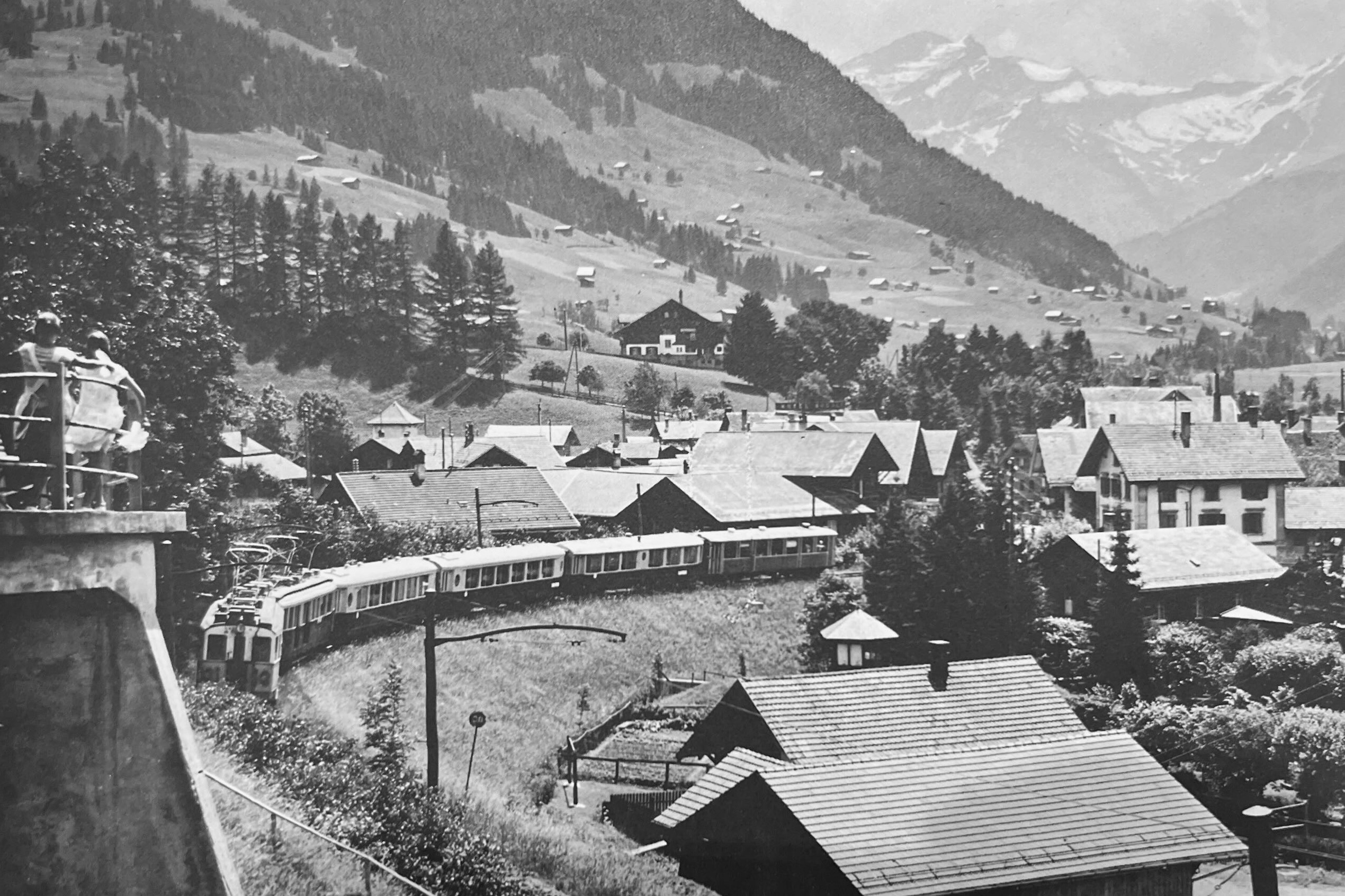
"Golden Mountain Pullman Express", operating from 15 June 1931 to 3 October 1931.

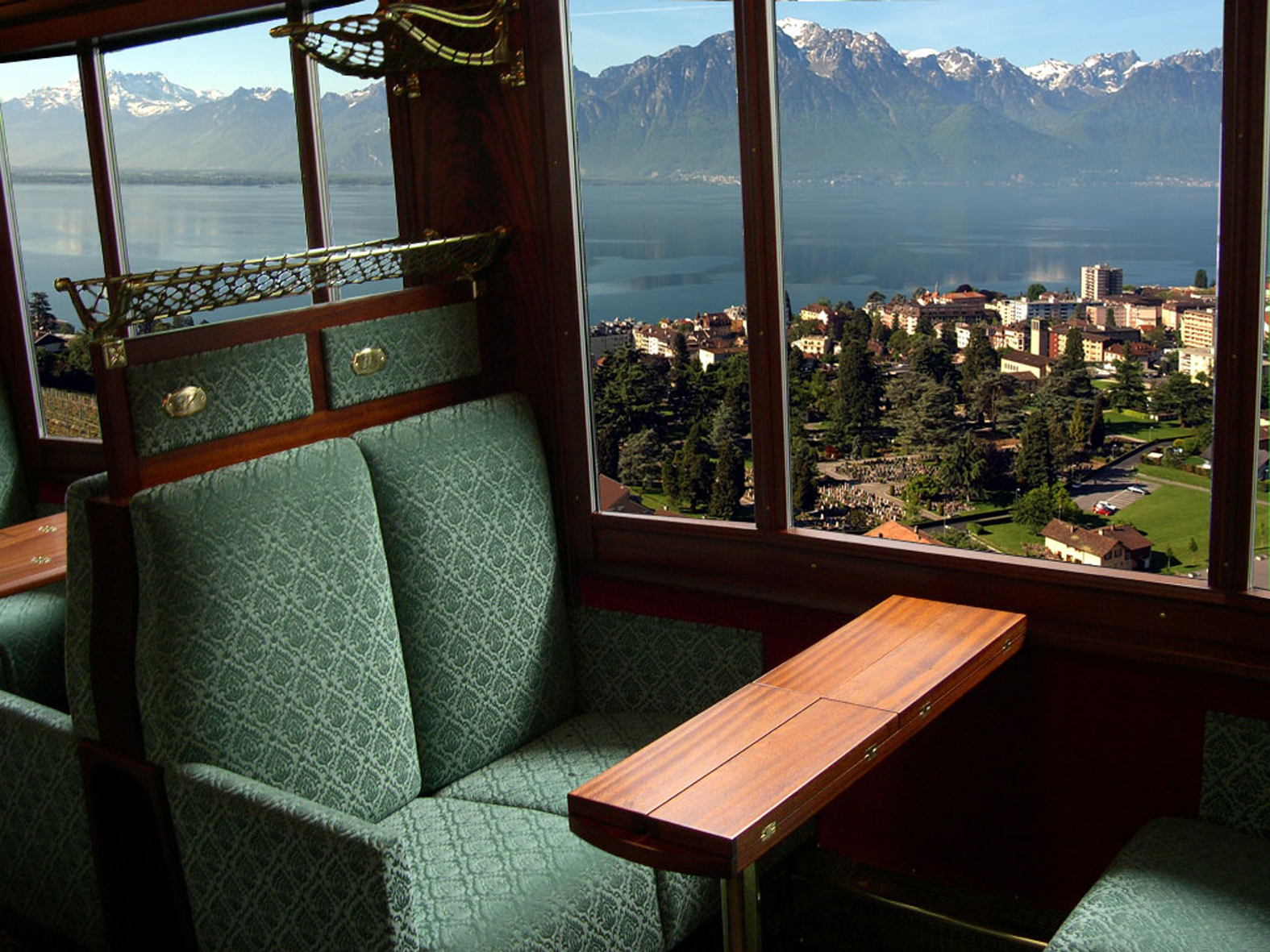
View from inside of the "GoldenPass Classic" also named as "GoldenPass Belle Époque", 2009.

The MOB begins its journey in Montreux, departing trains normally making use of platform 5 and arrivals platform 6, between the Swiss Federal Railway platforms and those of the rack and pinion railway to the Rochers de Naye. Winding its way up through the vineyards above Lake Geneva via Chamby, as far as Les Avants, the line passes through the crown tunnel under the Col de Jaman to reach the Saane Valley. In Montbovon there is a connection to the Transports Publics Fribourgeois (TPF; previously GFM) network. Following the Saane upstream, passing the famous hot-air ballooning centre of Château-d'Oex, it leaves the French-speaking canton of Vaud near Rougemont and enters the German-speaking canton of Bern. After Saanen the planners would have liked a direct ascent of the Saanenmöser Pass but without the aid of a rack and pinion system this was impossible and the line was diverted to loop around the village of Gstaad, adding greatly to the development and prosperity of the community. Beyond Gstaad railway station it begins the climb to the head of Saanenmöser Pass, the highest point on the line at 1,270 m (3,937 ft). On the other side it descends the Simmen Valley to Zweisimmen, where there is a connection to the standard gauge line of the BLS to Spiez.

Over the years, while passenger traffic boomed, freight traffic diminished with 2006 seeing the end of cement transport between Montreux and Saanen and the transport of standard gauge wagons on transporter bogies between Zweisimmen and stations to Rougemont and Lenk. By the end of the year the MOB was a passenger only operation, however in Spring 2007 the company purchased nine gravel (hopper) wagons and two surplus locomotives from the TPF. The MOB now operates this transport from Grandvillard (on the TPF line) to Saanen.

The Lenk branch retraces this route for a very short distance before continuing on its own trackbed. Because of its poor state of repair, this line was closed on 14 June 1975, however, it was fully modernized between 1977 and 1979, having new tracks and overhead lines, reopening on 27 September 1979. New rolling stock was purchased (* in the list below) to operate this line together with the weekdays school service between Zweisimmen and Saanen. Since reopening it has been included in the regular operating schedule of the MOB with timetabled connections to the main line services. To celebrate the centenary of the opening of the Lenk line (June 2012), the MOB arranged a week of festivities with a dinner, special fares and operation and display of rolling stock usually to be found on museum lines, particularly that at Blonay–Chamby Museum Railway.

- (Source: Journal du Pays d'Enhaut, published 24 May 2012)

== Modernisation program ==
In spring 2008, the MOB announced a four-year plan to modernise the railway infrastructure and rebuild stations to bring them all into the 21st century. This programme began with the demolition of little-used facilities: the goods shed in Gstaad and the shed in Château-d'Œx, this latter structure being replaced by a free-standing shelter, for example. During 2008, much work took place on the overhead line equipment, with replacement supports being positioned along the line. Although not brought into use, they stand ready for the new wiring. It is expected that this work will continue up to four nights per week through to December 2009, subject to weather conditions. New deeper ballasting has taken place along many sections of the line and this will be continued until the line has all been done.

The work at Gstaad consisted of a complete rebuilding of the platforms to full height and simplification of the track layout. After almost 100 years the station received platform canopies and passenger-operated lifts linked by a pedestrian underpass. During this rebuilding the station was reduced to a single line. The canopy is of wooden construction supported on metal uprights. The new layout gives the original platform as No.1 with the new island platform being Nos. 2 and 3. This work was officially opened, if not fully finished, on 13 June 2009.

At Saanenmöser station, a straightforward relaying and alignment took place through late 2008 to early 2009, which maintained the passing and siding facility at that location.

During the early part of 2010, by the end of May, the stations underwent a rebranding along with those of other lines which come under the "Golden Pass" banner. All were fitted with signs bearing the new "Golden Pass" logo and name alongside the station nameboards, which were retained in their original colours.

One of the smallest stations and halts (Les Combes, between Château-d'Œx and Rougemont) was given a new raised platform during Autumn 2011, leaving only the waiting shelter as original.

Work commenced on the rebuilding of Château-d'Œx station in mid–September 2013 and plans were published in the local newspaper with details of the work, which was carried out in three phases and completed by the end of 2014. Throughout the work, the passing-loop facility was maintained and raised platforms constructed, reached by subways from the station front. Construction work was delayed and the station officially reopened on 28 November 2015.

- (Source : 24 heures, Vaud edition, various dates in April/May 2009)
- (Source : Journal du Pays d'Enhaut, 1 October 2009)
- (Source : Journal du Pays d'Enhaut, 12 September 2013)
- (Source : Journal du Pays d'Enhaut, 26 November 2015)

== Timetables and train formations ==
From the beginning of the 2011 timetable, there are two Golden Pass Panoramic services with VIP domed observation cars, departing Montreux at 9:45 (Train 3118) and 15:45,(Train Nos 2128); the Lenk branch ceases to be served, the "through" working only lasting one year (2010). It is normally made up in the following formation and operate in the "push–pull" mode:

- Ast / Brs / As / Locomotive / BDs / Bs* / Arst* : This is the length limit of the train due to platform lengths. Trains may be shorter off-season.

In the reverse direction, the Golden Pass trains with VIP seating are the 12:26 (Train 2119) and 18:20 from Zweisimmen (Train 2131).

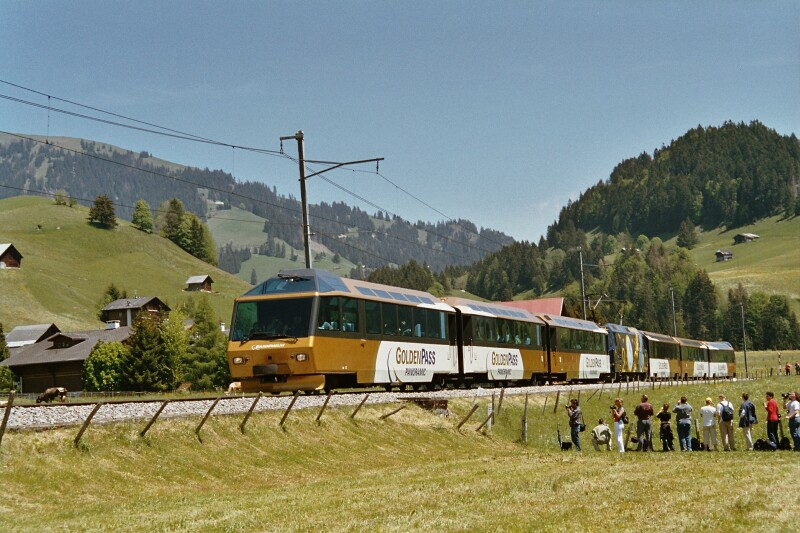
Golden Pass Panoramic passing near Rougemont during centennial celebration on 29 May 2004

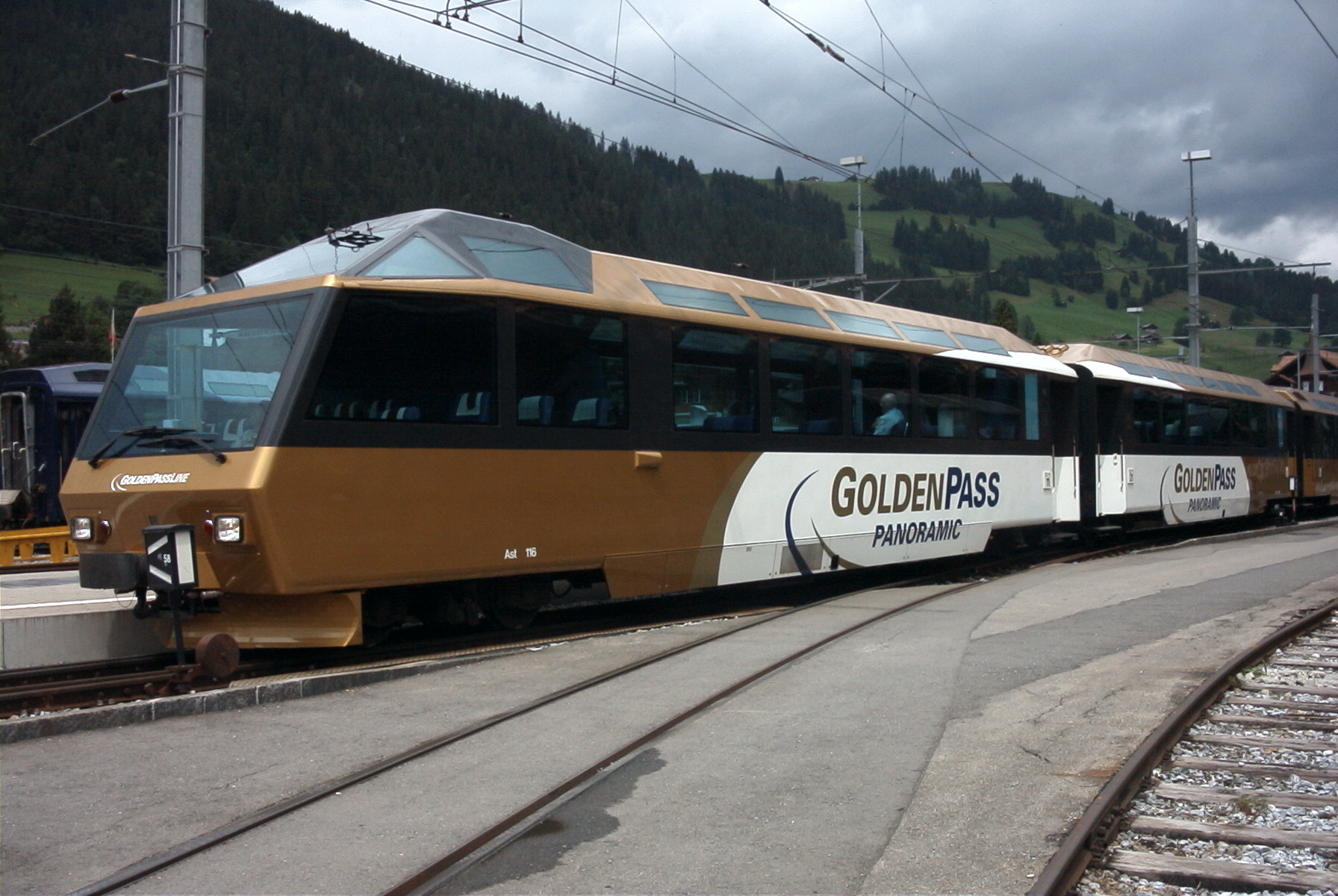
Ast 116 and Brs 228 at the head of a Montreux-bound train in Zweisimmen on 23 June 2004

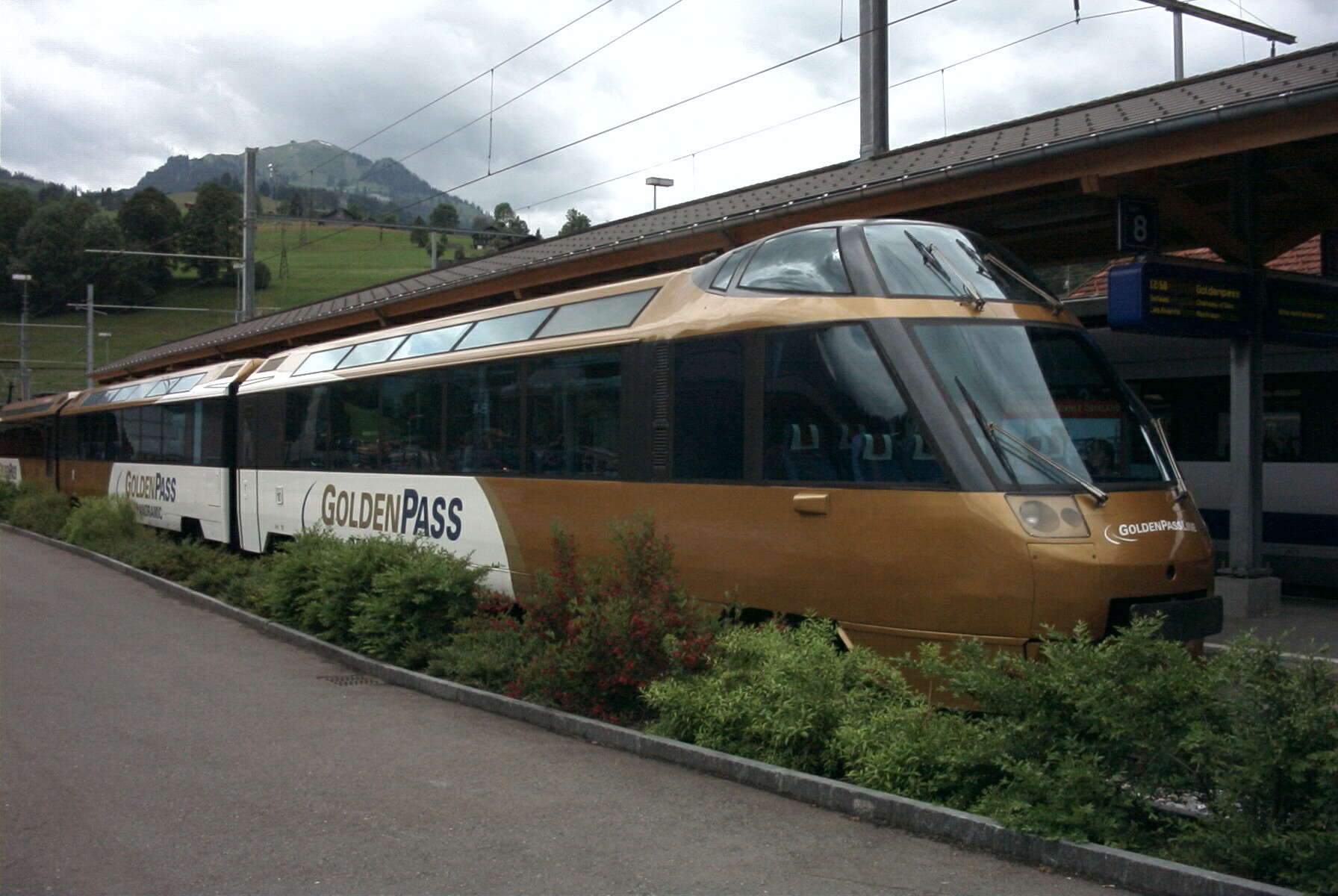
Arst 152 at the end of the same train

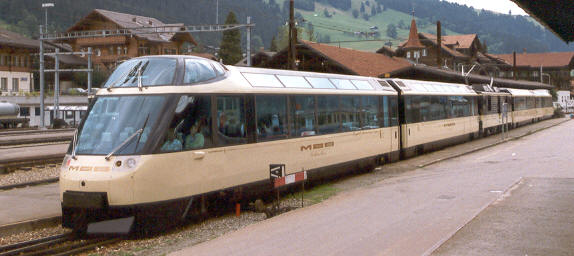
Original Crystal Panoramic livery of Arst 151–152 and As 153–154, now Bs 251–252. Zweisimmen, 17 July 1993

There are other Golden Pass trains without VIP seating (dome end cars) and these depart Montreux at 7:h45, 11:49, 14:47 and 17:45 (Trains 2112, 2124, 2228 and 2134) and from Zweisimmen at 8:26, 10:26, 14:26 and 17:05 (Trains 2111, 3115, 3123 and 2229). These trains are locomotive hauled and use stock not required for the trains with VIP seating. The formation, which is flexible, is usually as follows:

- Locomotive / As / As / BDs / Bs / Bs

This leaves a surplus of one domed observation car (two in use on the Golden Pass panorama and one on the "Chocolate Train")

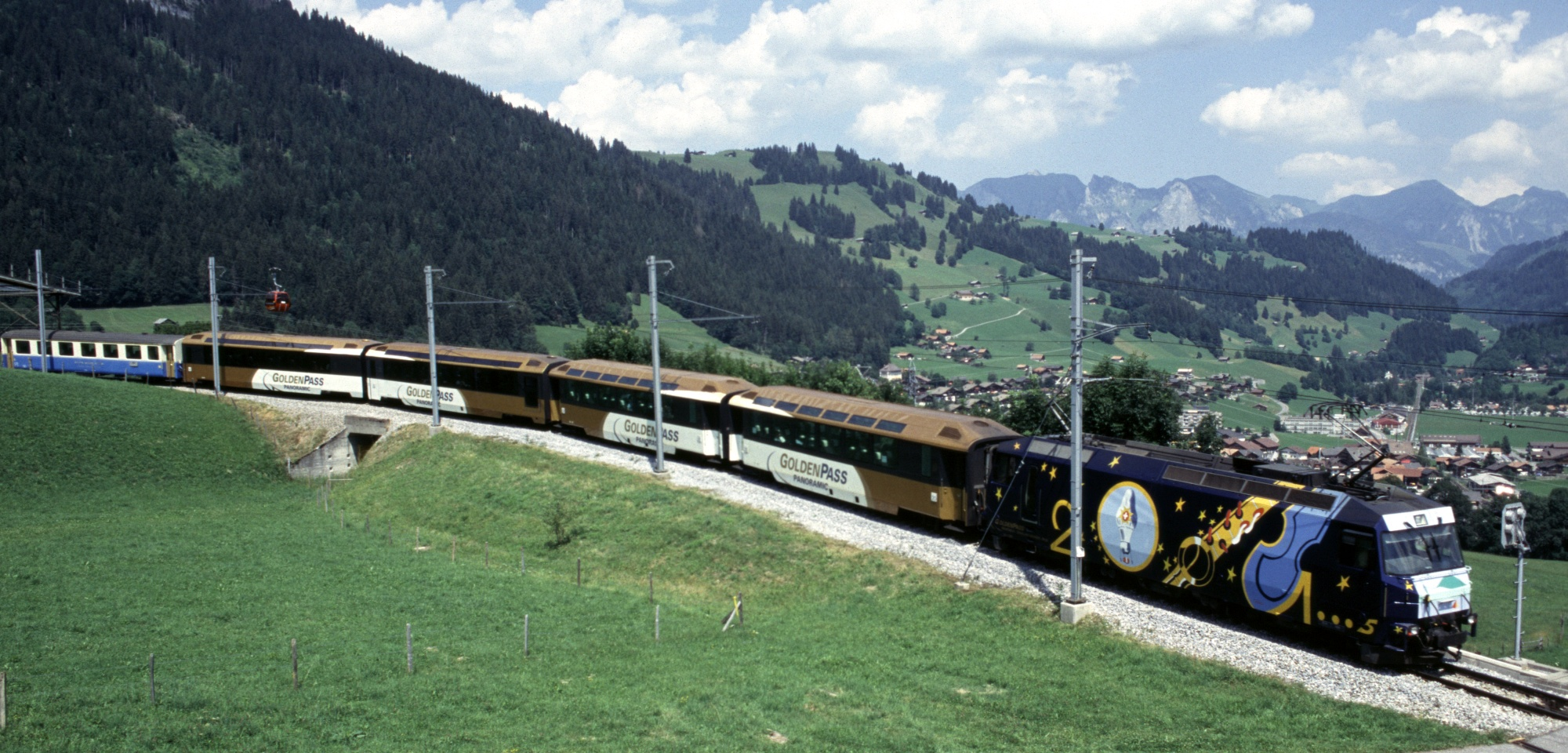
Golden Pass Panoramic with a blue/cream coach replacing a panoramic coach, 27 July 2006 above Zweisimmen

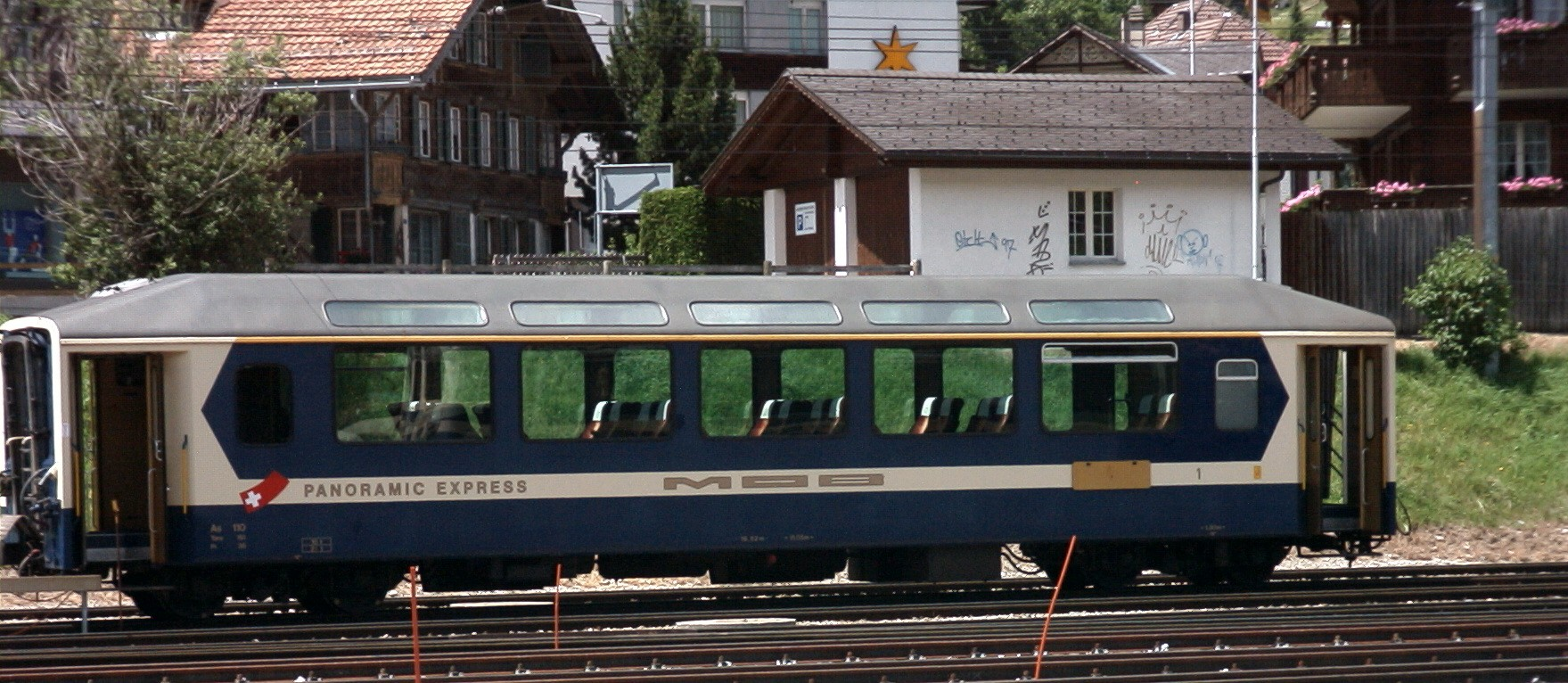
The very first panoramic coach, As 110 of 1976, still in its original livery which it maintained until May 2008 photographed on 25 June 2004 in Zweisimmen

Golden Pass Classic trains operate daily departing Montreux at 8:47 and 13:45 (Trains 2216 and 3126), returning from Zweisimmen at 11:09 and 16:26 (Trains 2217 and 2127) and are made up in the following formation:

- Locomotive / As / As / Brs / Bs / Non-Classic Type BD (to provide cycle / luggage space)

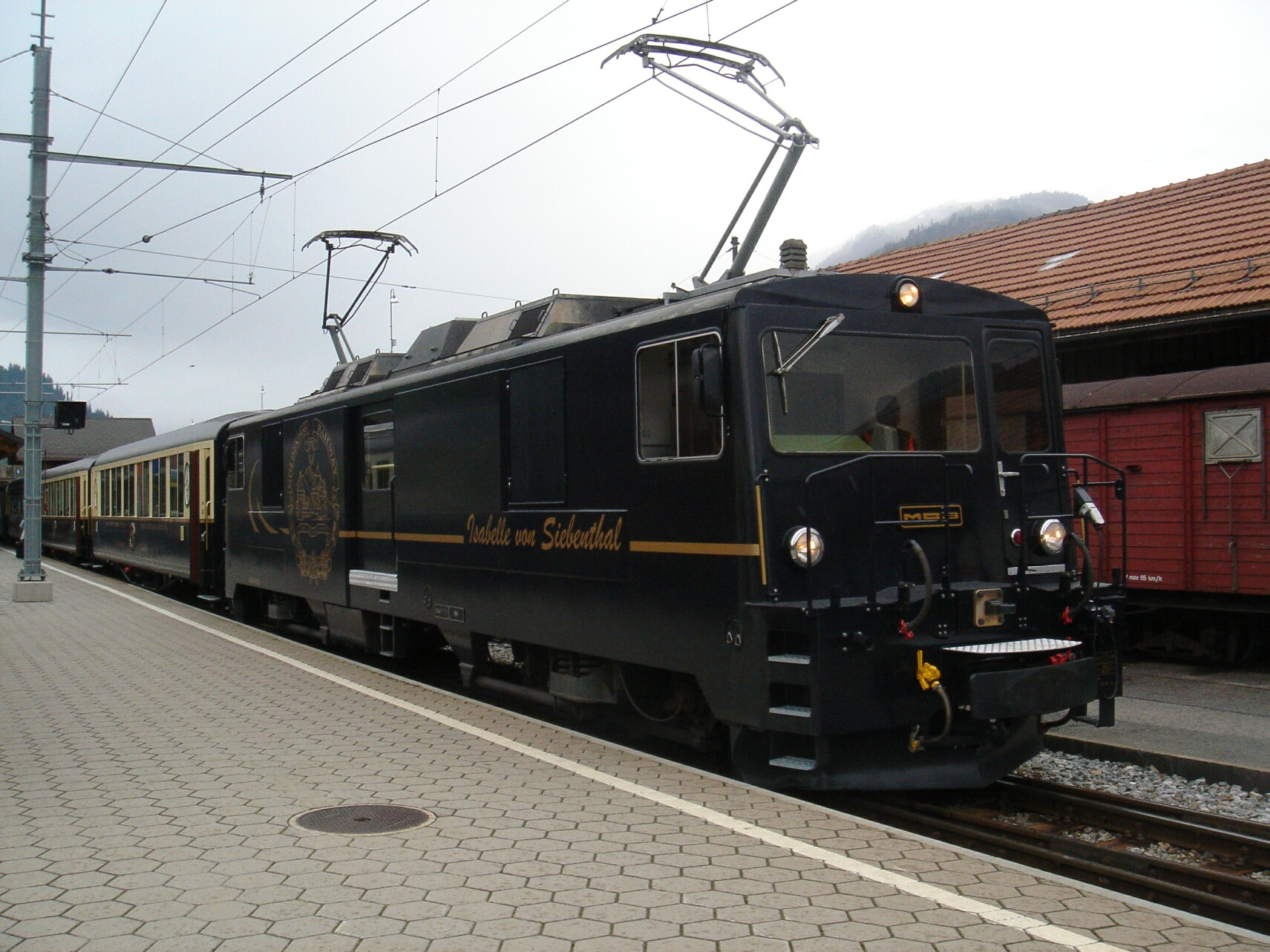
MOB GDe 4/4 6002 with Golden Pass Classic in Zweisimmen, 2005-05-06

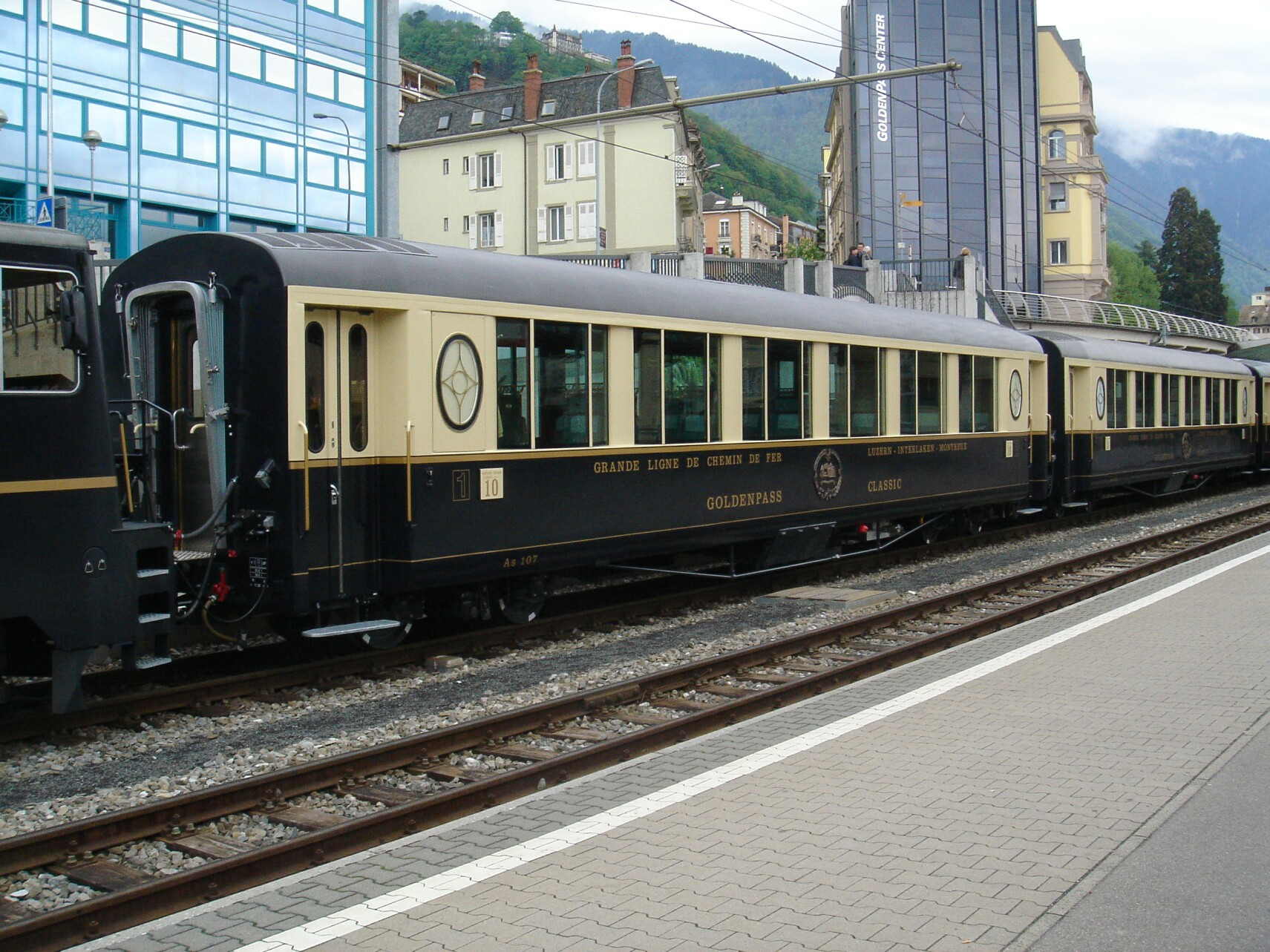
MOB As 107 and 103 after arrival of the Golden Pass Classic in Montreux

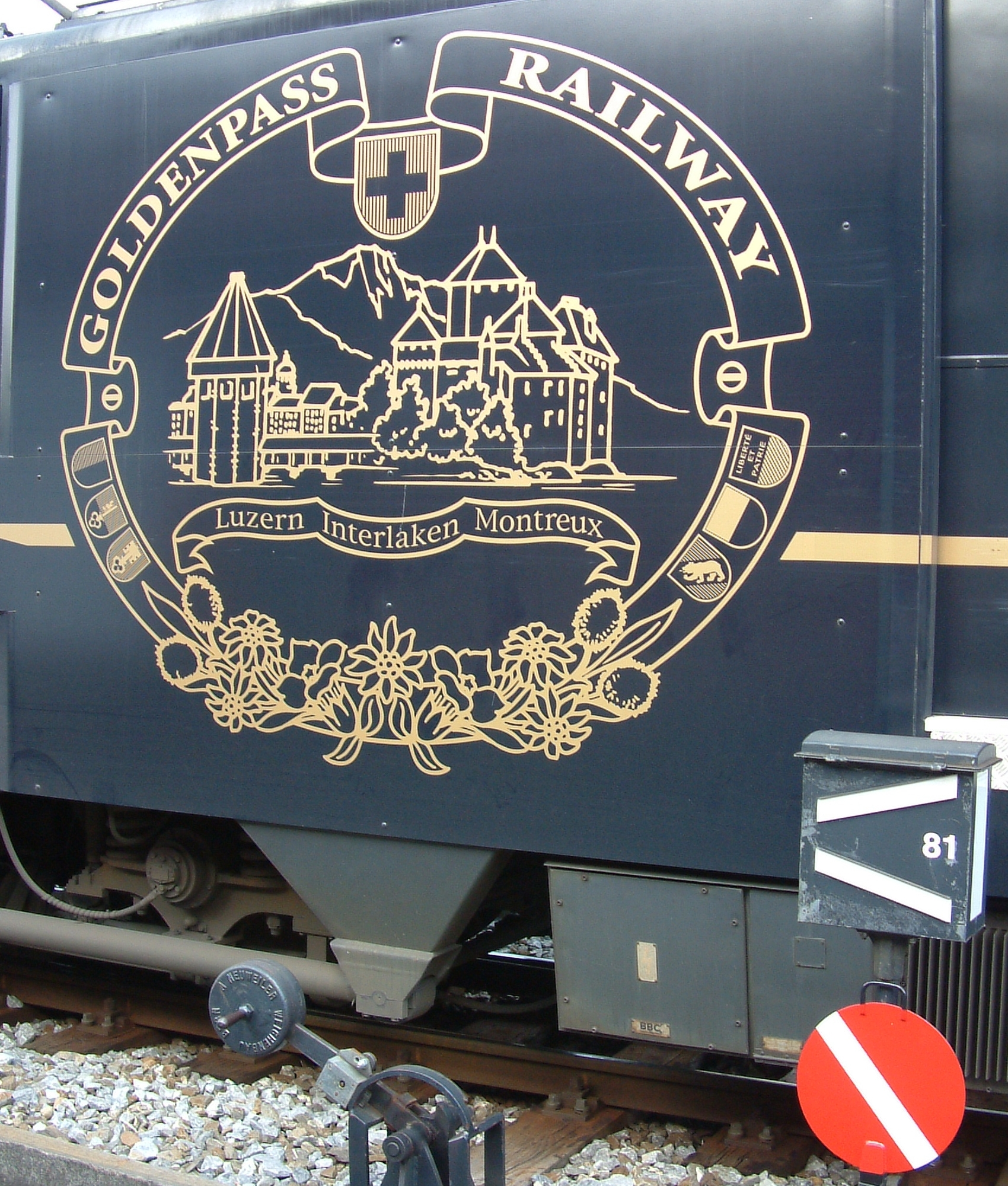
Detail of GDe 4/4 6002

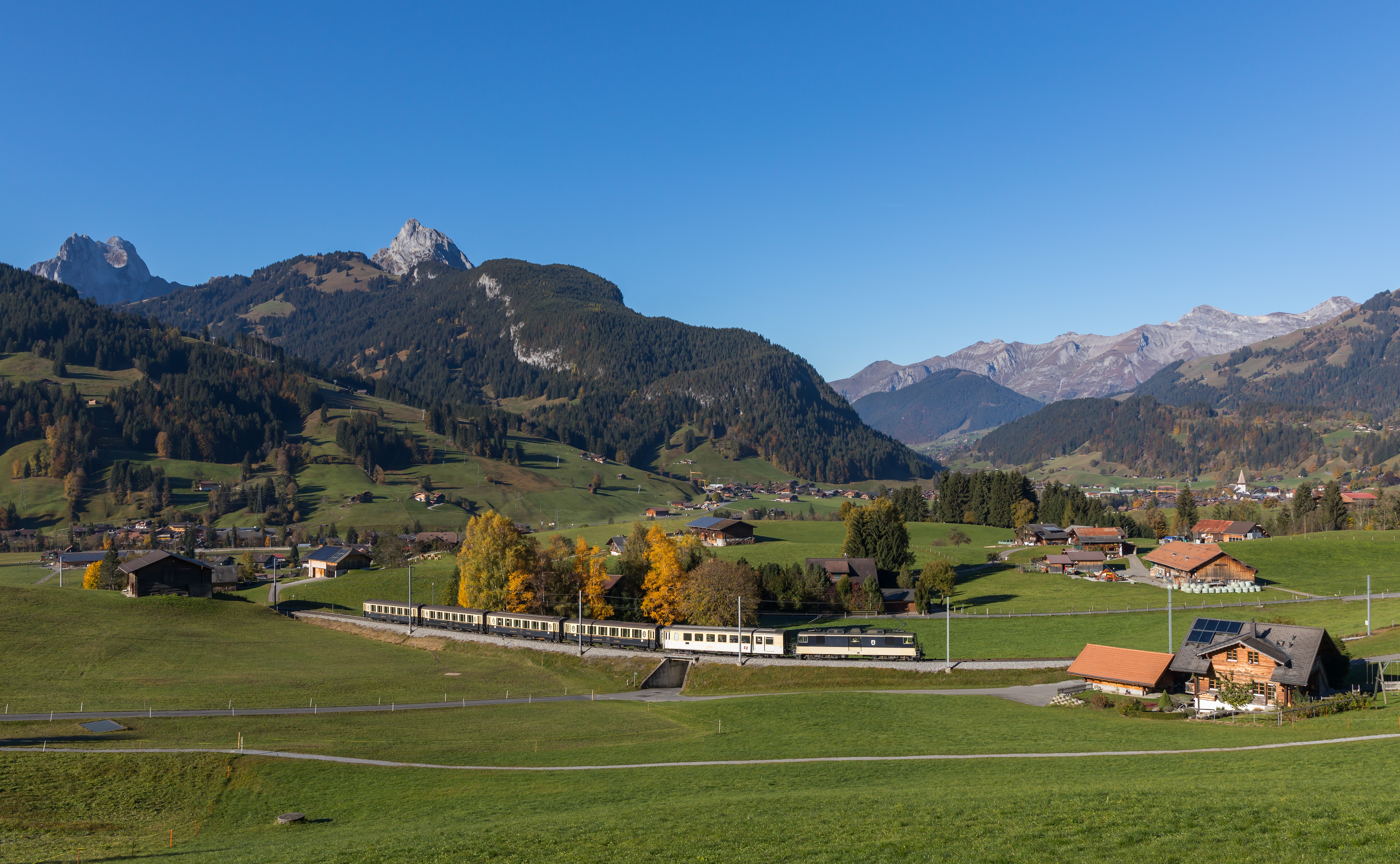
GDe 4/4 6004 hauls a Golden Pass Classic, between Gstaad and Gruben

The Golden Pass "Chocolate Train" operates in June, September and October every Monday, Wednesday and Friday and in July and August Monday to Friday, departing Montreux at 9:12 (Train 2118) but no return working is shown in the timetable. Until the end of the 2008 season, it was made up in the following formation which ran throughout between Montreux and Broc Fabrique:

- Locomotive / Belle Époque Ars / Belle Époque As / Other vehicles as required (usually Panorama type and/or Non-Classic type BD).

In the 2009 timetable the formation was changed and operated between Montreux and Gruyere only with a coach connection to Broc (due to operating problems), as follows:

- Locomotive (Usually 6003 Saanen, in special Chocolate Train livery) / Belle Epoque Ars / Belle Epoque Ars / Golden Pass Panorama observation car (No. 116 or 117) operating in Push – Pull mode.

Other trains Montreux–Zweisimmen may be pulled by a Ge 4/4, GDe 4/4 or an ABDe 8/8 and they can have up to five coaches.

Local services operate connecting Montreux to Fontanivent (Mon – Fri ), Chernex, Sonzier and Les Avants, operated by Be 2/6 7001–7004 and from Château-d'Oex, Saanen or Gstaad to Zweisimmen. The branch-line from Zweisimmen to Lenk offers a regular service timetabled to connect into and out of the MOB main line services. These trains are operated by Be 4/4 5001–5004.

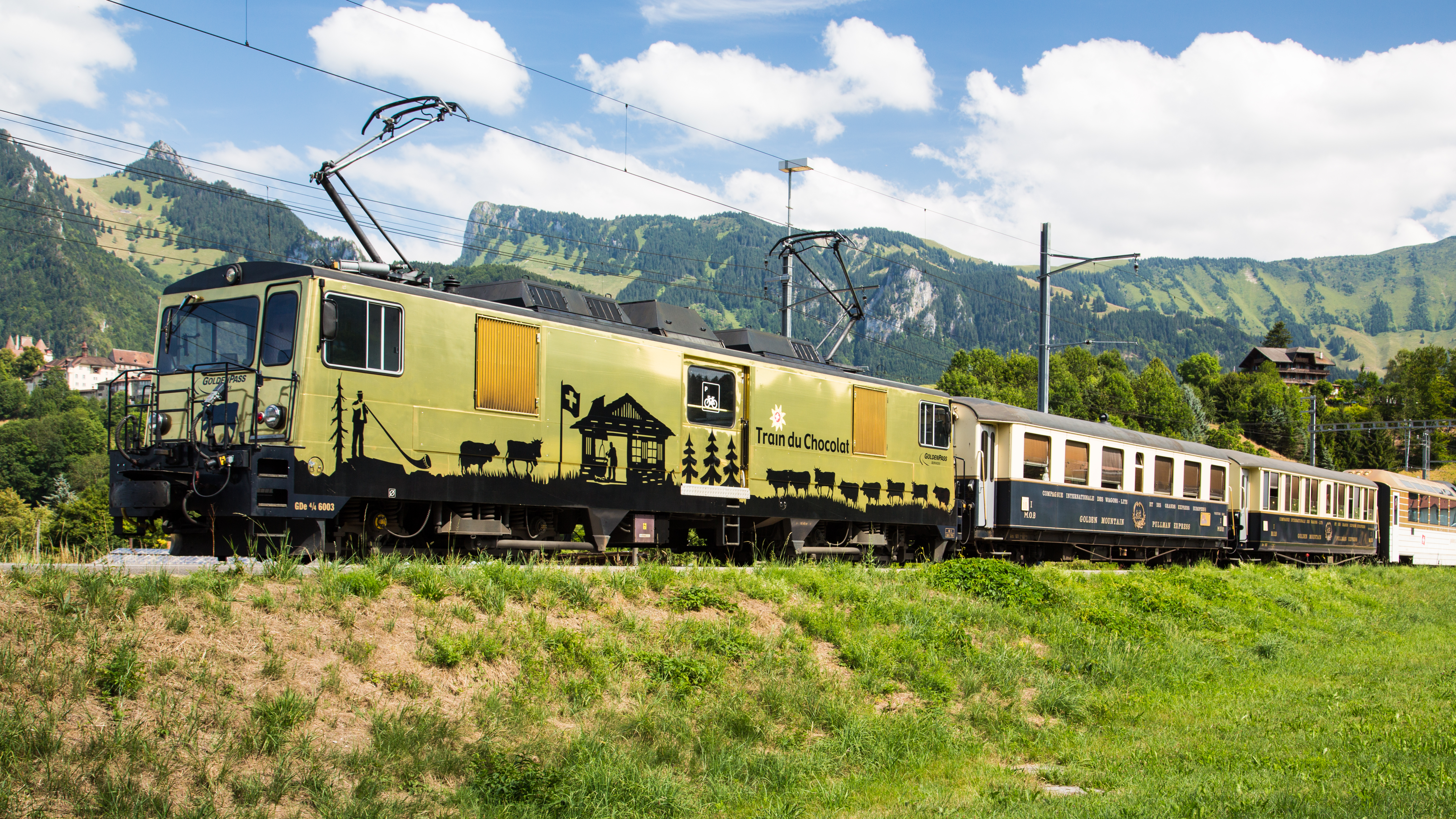
Chocolate train on the Montbovon – Broc line, with 1910s coaches

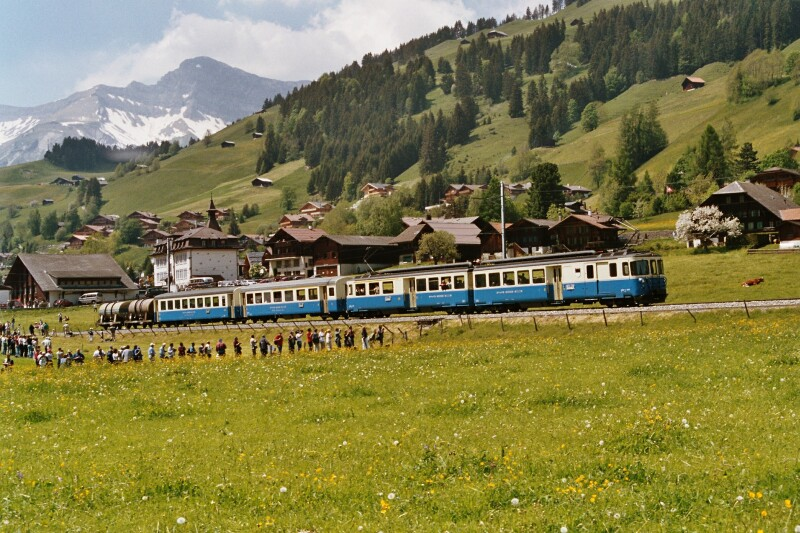
Regional train with ABDe 8/8 4004, AB 304, one B and two Ucek on 29 May 2004

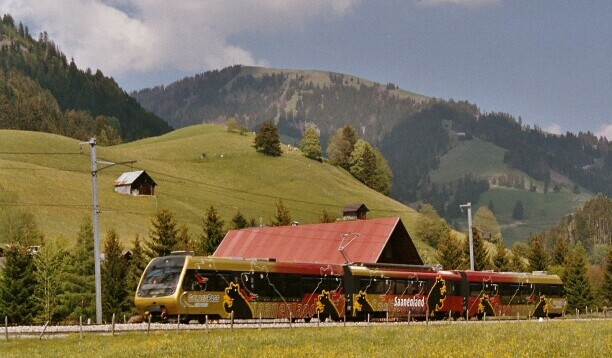
Local service with ABt 343 – Be 4/4 5003 – Bt 243 on 29 May 2004 near Rougemont

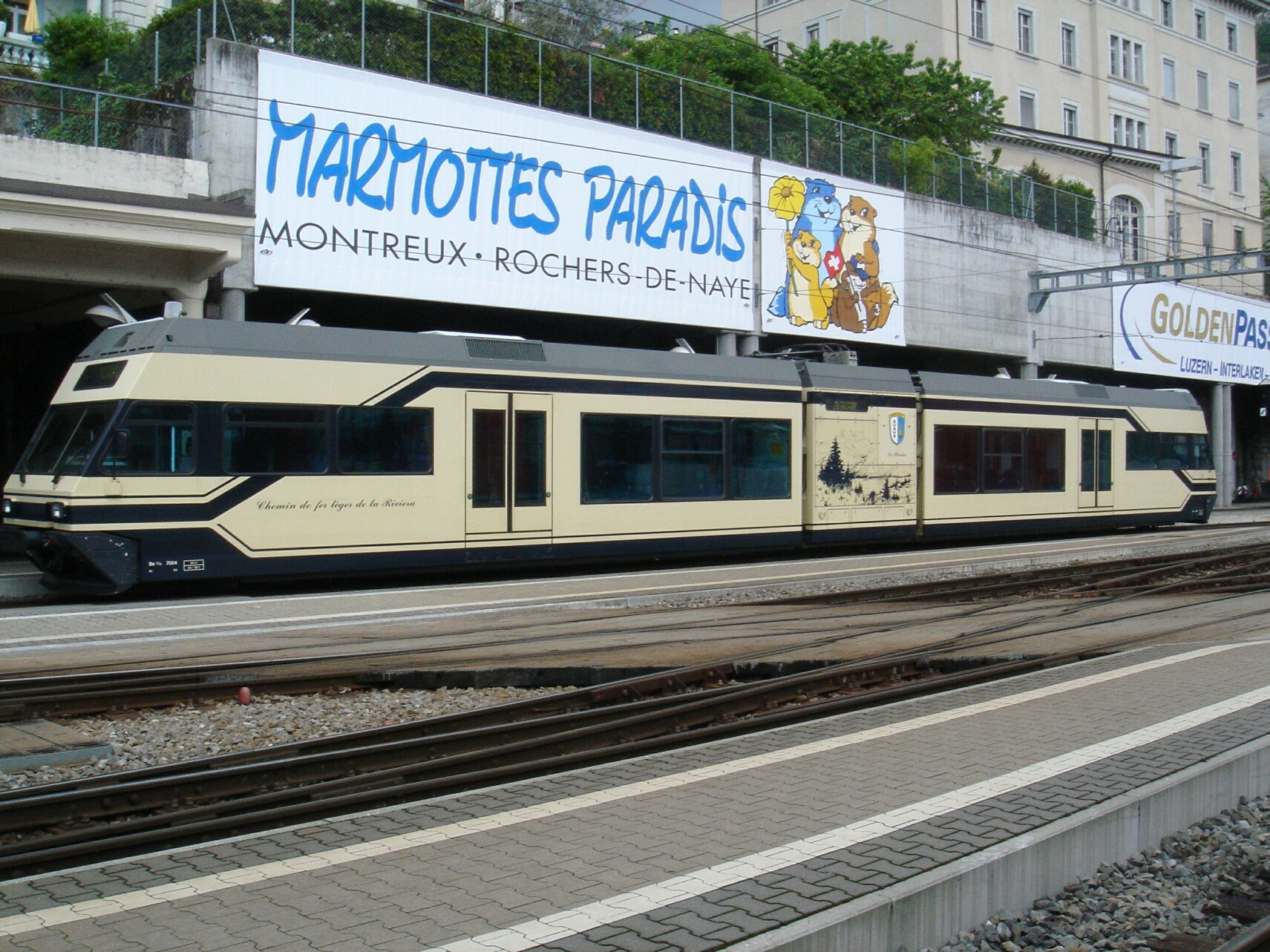
MVR Be 2/6 7004 in Montreux local service on 6 May 2005

== Locomotives and motor coaches ==
For decades, the traffic on the MOB was handled by electric motor coaches available in four-, six- and eight-axle designs. In 1983, four locomotives of the type GDe 4/4 were bought, to be followed in 1994 by four newer and more powerful Ge 4/4 locomotives from the same manufacturer. These are similar to the ones purchased by the Rhaetian Railway and BAM. Any of these locomotives can be seen working the principal trains.

In December 2006, the TPF relinquished its freight operations to the SBB Cargo, and its two GDe 4/4 locomotives became surplus to requirements. In April 2007, these were purchased by the MOB and have since been allocated numbers following on from those of their new owners.

The MOB is run with 900 V DC overhead contact and has gradients of up to 7.3% (1 in 13.5).

No.	Name	Class	Builders	Works No./Date Built	Notes.
3		Tm 2/2	KHD	55736-1955	Ex- V22, Euskirchener Kreisbahnen, Germany: Sold 1966 to VGH (Germany) V121.
4		Tm 2/2		1934	Ex-Rhätische Bahn 9913
5	Béa	Tm 2/2	Kaelble-Gmeinder	5553-1976	2007 ex-Benkler 25
6	Elsbeth	Tm 2/2	Kaelble-Gmeinder	5586-1980	2007 ex-Benkler 26
7		Tm 2/2		1950	Ex-Rhätische Bahn 9914
28		De 4/4	SIG/BBC	1924	Engineers Dept. Out of use, Fontaviant (8.13)
1001	Montreux	Be 4/4	ACMV/SWS/MFO/BBC	1955	Ex-Lugano–Cadro–Dino railway. Sold to MOB and rebuilt 1973. Repainted in Black/White locomotive livery with small "MOB Golden Pass" in black (on white) in Autumn 2015, Nameplates removed.
1002	Saanen	Be 4/4	SWS/SAAS	1951	Ex-Biasca–Acquarossa railway 4, reserve in Zweisimmen
1003		Be 4/4	SWS/SAAS	1958	Ex-Lugano–Ponte Tresa railway 5. Brought by MOB 1981, reserve in Saanen (July 2009)
1006		Be4/4	R+J	1997	Seen in Montreux, August 2022 sporting Midnight Blue / White livery.
1007		Be4/4	R+J	1997	Seen in Zweisimmen, August 2022 sporting Midnight Blue / White livery.
2003	Montbovon	Gm 4/4	Moyse/CFD*/Poyaud	1976	sent to Chernex works in spring 2009.
2004	Albeuve	Gm 4/4	Moyse/CFD*/Poyaud	1982	*Ateliers de Montmirail, Chassis No. BB825
3001	Rougemont	BDe 4/4	SIG/BBC	1944	Ex-2nd/Brake, now Engineers Dept. use. Retained blue/cream livery until scrapped in December 2009.
3002	Château-d'Œx	BDe 4/4	SIG/BBC	1944	Ex-2nd/Brake, At 7.2009 being stripped out, Chernex Works. Moved to Vevey for asbestos removal and at 6.2010 awaits further attention at Chernex.
3004		BDe 4/4	SIG/BBC	1944	Ex-2nd/Brake, now Engineers Dept. use, all over dark blue livery (2006), repainted Vevey, 2009.
3005		BDe 4/4	SIG/BBC	1946	Ex-2nd/Brake, now Engineers Dept. use, all over dark blue livery.
3006		BDe 4/4	SIG/BBC	1946	Ex-2nd/Brake, now Engineers Dept. use, all over dark blue livery.
4001	Suisse	ABDe 8/8	SIG/BBC/SAAS	1968	
4002	Vaud	ABDe 8/8	SIG/BBC/SAAS	1968	
4003	Bern	ABDe 8/8	SIG/BBC/SAAS	1968	
4004	Fribourg	ABDe 8/8	SIG/BBC/SAAS	1968	
*5001		Be 4/4	SIG/SAAS	1976	Note 1. Rebuilt Raility/MOB Chernex, left works 7 July 2009 - Originally named "Montreux" before rebuild.
*5002		Be 4/4	SIG/SAAS	1976	Note 1. Rebuilt Raility/MOB Chernex, left works 20 August 2008 - Originally named "Zweisimmen" before rebuild.
*5003		Be 4/4	SIG/SAAS	1976	Note 1. Rebuilt R+J/MOB Chernex, 2004 - Originally named "Lenk" before rebuild.
*5004		Be 4/4	SIG/SAAS	1976	Note 1. Rebuilt R+J/MOB Chernex, 200. - Originally named "St Stephan" before rebuild.
6001	Vevey	GDe 4/4	SLM/BBC	1983	
6002	Isabelle von Siebenthal	GDe 4/4	SLM/BBC	1983	Originally named "Rossiniere"
6003	Saanen	GDe 4/4	SLM/BBC	1983	In 1983, this locomotive broke the record for Swiss narrow gauge trains with a speed of 110 km/h. From April 2009 in "Chocolate Train" livery.
6004	Interlaken	GDe 4/4	SLM/BBC	1983	
6005		GDe 4/4	SLM/BBC	1983	Ex-TPF (GFM) No. 101 Ville de Bulle, Sold to MOB April 2007, name removed March 2008. Now in MOB livery.
6006		GDe 4/4	SLM/BBC	1983	Ex-TPF (GFM) No. 102 Neirivue, Sold to MOB April 2007, name removed June 2009. From summer 2015 it carries livery of Badoux Vins with the sides showing their most popular brand of red wine.
7501		ABeh 2/6	Stadler	2015 - 2017	Owned by MVR.
7502		ABeh 2/6	Stadler	2015 - 2017	Owned by MVR.
7503		ABeh 2/6	Stadler	2015 - 2017	Owned by MVR.
7504		ABeh 2/6	Stadler	2015 - 2017	Owned by MVR.
7505		ABeh 2/6	Stadler	2015 - 2017	Owned by MVR.
7506		ABeh 2/6	Stadler	2015 - 2017	Owned by MVR.
7507		ABeh 2/6	Stadler	2015 - 2017	Owned by MVR.
7508		ABeh 2/6	Stadler	2015 - 2017	Owned by MVR.
8001		Ge 4/4	SLM/ABB	1994	Livery: Testuz wines.
8002		Ge 4/4	SLM/ABB	1994	Livery: Midnight Blue / White. Note 3
8003		Ge 4/4	SLM/ABB	1994	Sold to RhB
8004		Ge 4/4	SLM/ABB	1994	Livery: Swisstainable.
9201		Be4/4	Stadler/ABB	1.2.2016	Livery: Midnight Blue / White. Note 3
9301		ABe4/4	Stadler/ABB	1.2.2016	Livery: Midnight Blue / White. Note 3
9202		Be4/4	Stadler/ABB	9.3.2016	Livery: Midnight Blue / White. Note 3
9302		ABe4/4	Stadler/ABB	9.3.2016	Livery: Midnight Blue / White. Note 3
9203		Be4/4	Stadler/ABB	9.3.2016	Livery: Midnight Blue / White. Note 3
9303		ABe4/4	Stadler/ABB	9.3.2016	Livery: Midnight Blue / White. Note 3
9204		Be4/4	Stadler/ABB	7.6.2016	Livery: Midnight Blue / White. Note 3
9304		ABe4/4	Stadler/ABB	7.6.2016	Livery: Midnight Blue / White. Note 3

Withdrawn and Preserved Items

No.	Name	Class	Builders details	Date Built	Notes.
1		Tm 2/2	O&K, Berlin	1930	Blonay–Chamby Museum Railway, 2006.
2	Heinrich II	Tm 2/2	KHD	1953	Ex-Juist Island (Germany); to Chemin de Fer de la Somme.
11		BCFe 4/4	SIG/Alioth	1905	Blonay–Chamby Museum Railway, 1999.
26		BFZe 4/4	SIG/Alioth	1914	1995 to Modellbahngruppe Obersimmental-Sannenland, stabled on line at Saanen. Repainted blue/cream livery, May 2008
27		De 4/4	SIG/BBC	1924	Engineers Dept., scrapped July 2002
36		BDe 4/4	SIG/SWS/VBW/MFO	1913	Rebuilt 1951, handed over to association "Ds Blaue Bähnli" in 2007, who plan to return it to Bern – Worb.
37		BDe 4/4	SIG/SWS/VBW/MFO	1913	Rebuilt 1958, scrapped July 2000
61		B4	SIG	1906	Pre-1956 Second Class saloon coach, 1979 to Modellbahngruppe Obersimmental-Sannenland, stabled on line at Saanen. Repainted blue/cream livery, May 2008
529		K (Gk)	Busch, Bautzen	1905	1995 to Modellbahngruppe Obersimmental-Sannenland, stabled on line at Saanen.
1004					Scrapped 1996
1005					Scrapped 1996
1006			SWS/SAAS		Preserved at VBW
2002		DZe 6/6	SIG/BBC	1932	Works No.3702., to Blonay–Chamby Museum Railway 2008
3003		BDe 4/4	SIG/BBC		Scrapped 1996
3004		Be 4/4	SWS/SAAS	1944	Built and painted special livery for the Super Panorama Express.

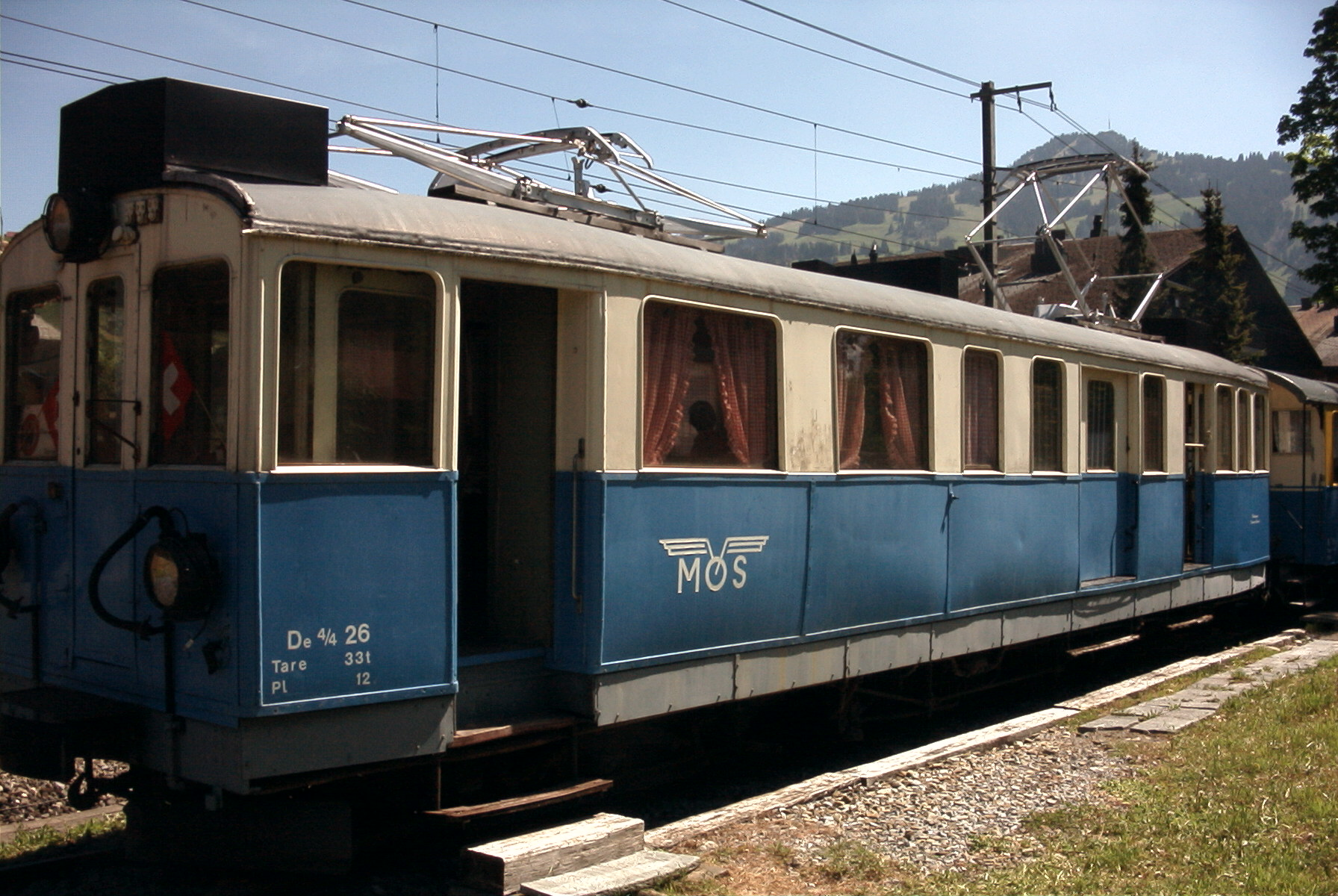
MOB De 4/4 26, former BFZe 4/4, fast train motor coach from 1912, in use as club home in Saanen

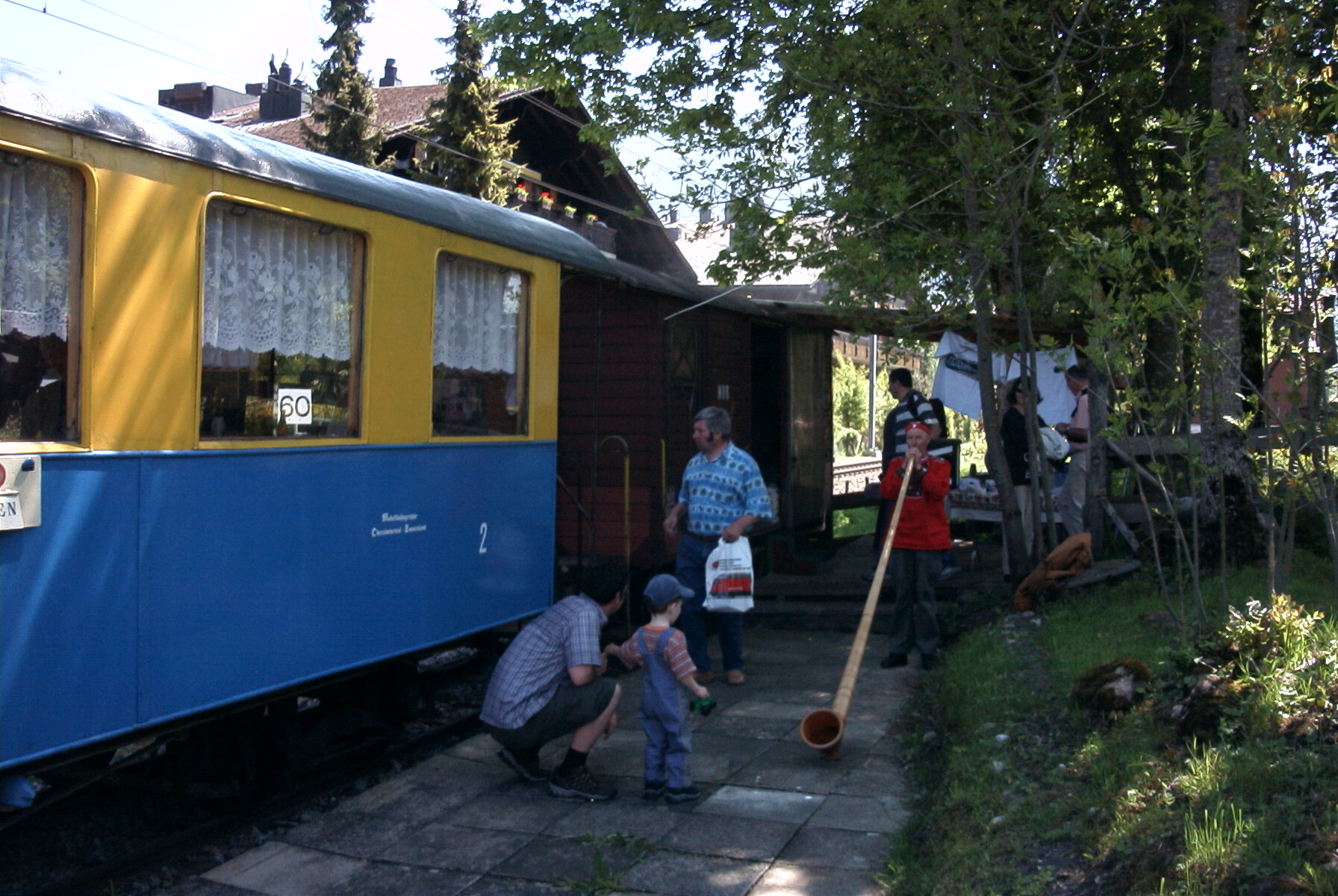
MOB B 61 and Gk (ex-K) 529 in use as club home in Saanen, with activity of the centennial celebration in 2004

Note 1: Class Be 4/4 after rebuild operate as the centre-car (non driving motor) of a three-car set made up as Bt – BDe4/4 – ABt. The Bt vehicles are numbered 241 – 244 and the ABt vehicles 341 – 344. Bt242 carries R+J Builders plate 70671 – 2005.

Note 2: Class Be 2/6, No's 7001 to 7004, are listed under the stock owned by the Chemins de fer électriques Veveysans (CEV) but they also work short journeys over the MOB from Montreux to Fontanivent, Sonzier and Les Avants.

Note 3: These units operate in pairs [ie xx02 + xx03] with coaches between-

=== Abbreviations ===
- ABB/BBC Asea-Brown-Boveri / Brown, Boveri & Cie
- ACMV Ateliers de constructions mécaniques de Vevey
- O&K Orenstein & Koppel
- R+J Ramseier and Jenzer, Biel.
- SAAS Société Anonyme des Ateliers de Sécheron, Geneva.
- SLM Swiss Locomotive & Machine Works, Winterthur
- SIG Schweizerische Industriegesellschaft, Neuhausen am Rheinfall
- SWS Schweizerische Wagons- und Aufzügefabrik, Schlieren ZH

== Livery ==
In 2009, a decision was made to change the livery on all rolling stock except for the Golden Pass Panorama and Golden Pass Classic trains. This was to include the various railways and funiculars marketed under the "Golden Pass" banner and the buses operated by the company. The colour scheme is to be a gold (lower portion) and white (upper portion) with all stock being rebranded "Golden Pass". The new colours will be applied to the stock as it passes through works, although the "Golden Pass" logo will be applied as soon as practicable. The first vehicle to be reliveried, First / Second Composite Coach AB307, appeared in traffic on 27 August 2010 (1).

- (Source : Journal de Pays d'Enhaut, 1 October 2009)
- ((1) Source : Journal de Pays d'Enhaut, 26 August 2010)

== Passenger rolling stock ==
The passenger carrying rolling stock can be divided into the categories: "Classic", "Panoramic", "Ordinary" and "Saanenland".

=== Classic stock ===
"Classic" stock are six Pullman type coaches, two from 1914 and four rebuilt in 2004–06 on structures from 1964. Details are as follows:

- Type Ars : Belle Epoque, First Class saloon built in 1914, No. 101. Along with As 102 this normally works as part of the "Chocolate Train" formation.
- Type As : Belle Epoque, First Class saloon with 36 seats, built in 1914, No. 102. This coach served as prototype for the CIWL coaches and also for the rebuilds of 2004–06. Along with Ars 101 this is normally to be found in the "Chocolate Train" formation.
- Type As : Pullman Saloon Car, First Class Nos. 103 and 107. Built in 1964 and rebuilt in 2004/05, Air Conditioned. No. 103 has 36 seats, No. 107 has 38.
- Type Brs : Second Class Pullman "Cave Car" (Buffet), No. 201. Built in 1964 and rebuilt in 2005 with air conditioning and seats for 47 passengers.
- Type Bs : Second Class Pullman Saloon Car, No. 202. Built in 1964 and rebuilt in 2006 with air conditioning and seats for 56 passengers.

=== Panoramic stock ===
"Panoramic" stock is that used on the Golden Pass Panoramic services and includes the observation vehicles used at each end of train when the locomotive is centrally situated. Most "panoramic" coaching stock has been built by the former Biel-based coach work builder Ramseier+Jenzer. All coaches are air conditioned. These include:

R+J	As 110; 1976	As 111; 1979	As 112; 1982		As 114; 1983	Ars 115 now 228	Ast 116; 1985	Ast 117; 1986	As 118; 1992	As 119; 1993
Breda		Arst 151; 1993	Arst 152; 1993	As 153 now 251	As 154 now 252					
R+J	BDs 220; 1979 (a)	Brs 221; 1979	Bs 222; 1982	Bs 223; 1982	BDs 224; 1982	BDs 225; 1983	Bs 226; 1989	Bs 227; 1990	Brs 228; 1985/95	
Breda		Bs 251; 1993	Bs 252; 1993							

- Type As : First Class saloon coach, Nos. 110, 111, 112, 114, built 1976–83 and 118–119, built 1992–93. These coaches were originally seated 2+2 but since been changed to 2+1, reducing their seating capacity to 33. Coach No. 110 was the last of these coaches to carry the dark blue and cream livery and have the 2+2 seating. It entered Chernex workshops in early May 2008 for rebuilding and returned to service at the end of September.
- Type Ast : First Class Observation Car, Nos. 116 (named Lausanne) and 117 (named Château-d'Oex), built 1985–86. These vehicles have 8 seats in the "Observation Dome", now facing Montreux.
- Type Arst: First Class Observation Car, Nos., 151 and 152, built in 1993 by Breda. With a seating capacity of 27 plus 8 seats within the "Observation Dome", now facing Zweisimmen.
- Type Bs : Second Class saloon, Nos. 251 and 252, built in 1993 by Breda as As 153–154. With a seating capacity of 48. These coaches were nearly identical to those delivered to FO and BVZ, now Matterhorn Gotthard Bahn (MGB).
- Type Bs : Second Class saloon, Nos. 222, 223, built 1982 and 226, 227 built 1989.
- Type BDs : Second Class saloon with disabled compartment and wheelchair lift, Nos. 220 (a), 224 and 225, built 1979–83, rebuilt 2001–02.
- Type Brs : Second Class buffet, Nos. 221 and 228, built 1979 and 1985 (as Ars 115) and rebuilt 1987/95.

Note (a). BDs No. 220 was outshopped from Chernex in late June 2010, following a press demonstration the previous month, as the first vehicle to be fitted on axle-less, dual gauge bogies to be tested for readiness for the route running to Interlaken.

== Ordinary stock ==
The "Ordinary" stock is used on all services not operated by the Panoramic and Classic coaches. These are painted in a light blue and cream livery and can be hauled by locomotives or railcars. They also include driving trailers (Voiture pilote). These are

- Type ABt : Driving Trailer Composite, Nos. 5301 to 5304. Withdrawn and rebuilt with new bodies and bogies by R+J / Raility, renumbered 341 to 344 as part of "Saanenland" sets 5001 to 5004 inc. (See Below)
- Type ABDt: Driving Trailer Composite with guards/luggage compartment, No. 3301 (At July 2009 working with 3001 in Engineers Dept. use).
- Type A : First Class saloon, Nos. 105 and 106. (No.A105 was made available for sale in Spring 2010, No. A106 was repainted in "Golden Pass" livery, Spring 2011).
- Type AB : First/Second Composite, Nos. 303 to 308. AB307 became the first vehicle to outshopped in the new gold/white livery in August 2010.
- Type B : Second Class saloon, No. 207, "Marmotte Paradis" (Rochers de Naye) Livery. This coach, along with A105, was made available for sale in Spring 2010.
- Type B : Second Class saloon, No. 208, Painted in a special livery depicting road transport from the stagecoach to the early motor car. Lettered "Saanenland – Enhaut".
- Type B : Second Class saloon, Nos. 203, 209 to 213 and 215 to 218.
- Type B : Second Class saloon, No. 214. Painted in a white livery advertising KPT, the insurers of the MOB.
- Type BD : Second Class saloon with guards/parcels compartment, Nos. 204 to 206
- Type BD : Short, Single Second Class saloon with guards/parcels compartment, Nos. 32 and 33.
- Type D : Short length, Guards / Parcels / Cycle vehicle, No. 31

=== Saanenland stock ===
"Saanenland" stock is specially liveried for work over the Zweisimmen to Lenk line and local services between Zweisimmen and Saanen. The stock works in conjunction with motor vehicles of type Be 4/4, Nos. 5001–4 and these sets are usually worked as fixed formations of Bt-Be 4/4-ABt, the first being ready for traffic in 2004 was 243-5003-343. 244-5004-344 followed in 2006 and 242-5002-342 left Chernex works for traffic on 20 August 2008. The final unit, No. 241 – 5001 – 341 left Chernex on 7 July 2009 and was seen in Zweissimann two days later having worked a service from Montreux. The driving trailers that replaced ABt 5301-04 are:

- Type Bt : Second class driving trailer, Nos. 241 to 244.
- Type ABt: First / Second Composite driving trailer, Nos. 341 to 344.

x43 and x44 were built by Ramseier+Jenzer and fitted with SIG-type bogies, x41 and x42 are built by Raility, the successor company of R+J, and will receive Alstom Centro 1000 bogies with air suspension on delivery.

=== New stock on order ===
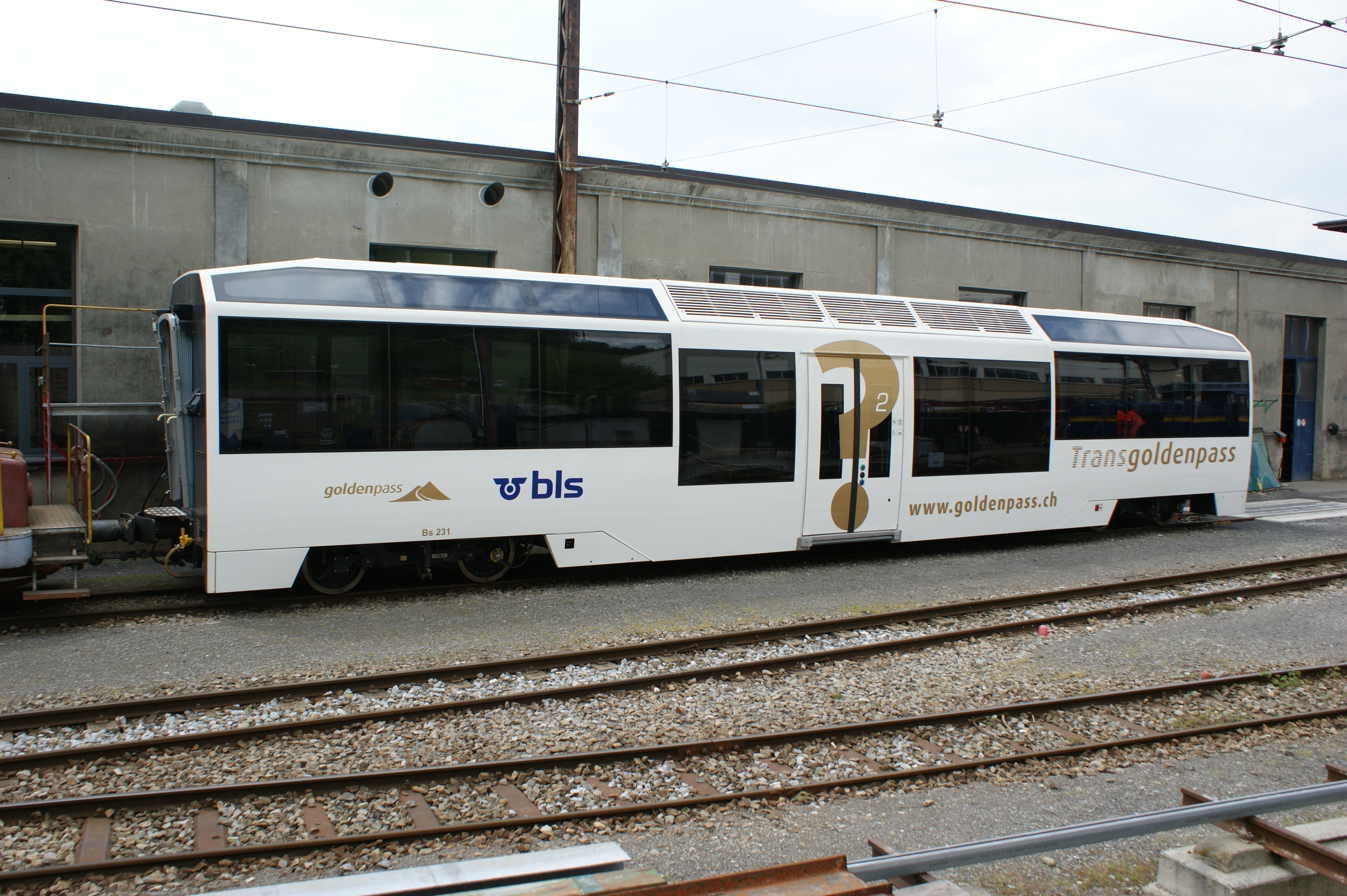
Bs 231 on 18 May 2010 at Chernex workshops

On 22 June 2007, the MOB gave details to the press that it had placed orders with Raility of Biel for eight new air-conditioned coaches with large panoramic windows and low-floor access and seating. The coaches will have standard-level seating at the vestibule ends, with a central section of low-floor seating containing the access doors which will assist those with restricted mobility. They will also contain handicapped-accessible toilets. The coaches will be fitted with a new type of bogie "Centro 1000" incorporating air suspension, produced by Alstom. The first of these, number Bs230, was delivered from Chernex works into traffic during mid-May 2010. The livery is white all over with the lettering in gold showing the new "golden pass" symbol and lettered Transgoldenpass. The blue lettering "bls" is also featured. The second coach is expected to be ready for traffic in June 2010. Four of the new coaches will be put between the two halves of ABDe 8/8 4001–4004, forming three-car-EMUs.

The first of these to enter full revenue–earning service did so in mid-December 2010 when 231 and 232 were formed as a regular part of the "Golden Pass Panorama" trains 3118/2119/2128/2131

Source : MOB/Raility press release together with personal observation.

== Variable gauge bogies ==
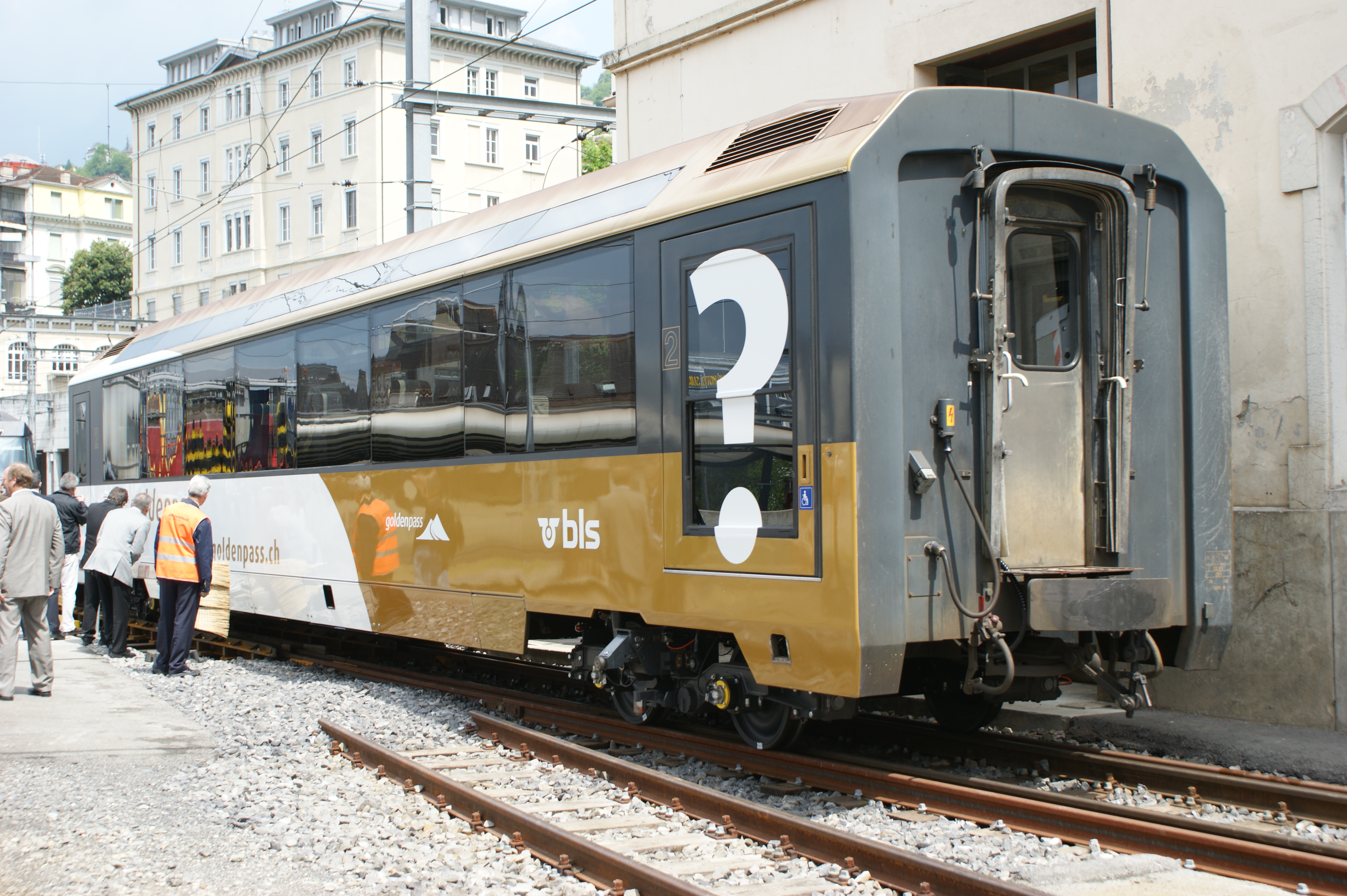
BDs 220, the first coach with variable gauge bogies, seen here on standard gauge at Montreux on 18 May 2010

On 18 May 2010, MOB invited press and officials to demonstrate the first Panoramic coach (BDs 220) fitted with variable gauge bogies to allow through running across the 1,000 mm (3 ft 3 3/8 in) metre gauge / 1,435 mm (4 ft 8 1/2 in) standard gauge break-of-gauge. The axle-less bogie was developed by MOB and engineered by Prose company of Winterthur. Some components were designed for the Centro 1000 bogie and built by Alstom. Apart from changing the gauge, the bogies also adjust the height of the coaches to suit the different platform heights on the two gauges. MOB announced commercial service with variable gauge trains for 2015. The date of commercial through running Montreux to Interlaken has been postponed several times. Delays in manufacturing due to COVID-19 have been cited in 2020 and 2021. In spring 2021 launch date was set to 11 December 2022.

== Accidents and incidents ==
On 3 January 2018, one of three carriages of a train was blown off the tracks in high winds at Lenk. Eight people were injured.

== See also ==
- List of heritage railways and funiculars in Switzerland
- List of narrow-gauge railways in Switzerland

== Sources, further reading ==
=== Sources ===
- Michel Grandguillaume, Gérald Hadorn, Sébastien Jarne and Jean-Louis Rochaix: Chemin de fer Montreux Oberland Bernois. Du Léman au Pays-d'Enhaut, Vol 1. Bureau vaudois d'addresses (BVA), Lausanne, ISBN 2-88125-008-4
- Michel Grandguillaume, Gérald Hadorn, Sébastien Jarne and Jean-Louis Rochaix: Chemin de fer Montreux Oberland Bernois, Du Léman au Pays-d'Enhaut, Vol 2. Bureau vaudois d'addresses (BVA), Lausanne, ISBN 2-88125-009-2
- 75 Jahre MOB, 75 ans MOB, 1901–1976. (Bilingual: French and German), Chemin de fer Montreux-Oberland Bernois (MOB), Montreux, 1976, no ISBN.
- Edward W. Paget Tomlinson, Roger Kaller and Pierre Stauffer: Die Montreux-Berner Oberland-Bahn, Le Montreux-Oberland Bernois, The Montreux-Oberland Bernois Railway. (Trilingual: English, French and German), Chemin de fer Montreux-Oberland Bernois (MOB), Montreux, 1985, no ISBN.
- Jean-Michel Hartmann: Zauber der MOB, Magie du MOB. (Bilingual: French and German), Ott Verlag, Thun, 1985. ISBN 3-7225-6331-3
