= Montreux–Lenk im Simmental line =

Railway line in Switzerland

Coordinates: 46°26′8″N 6°54′40″E

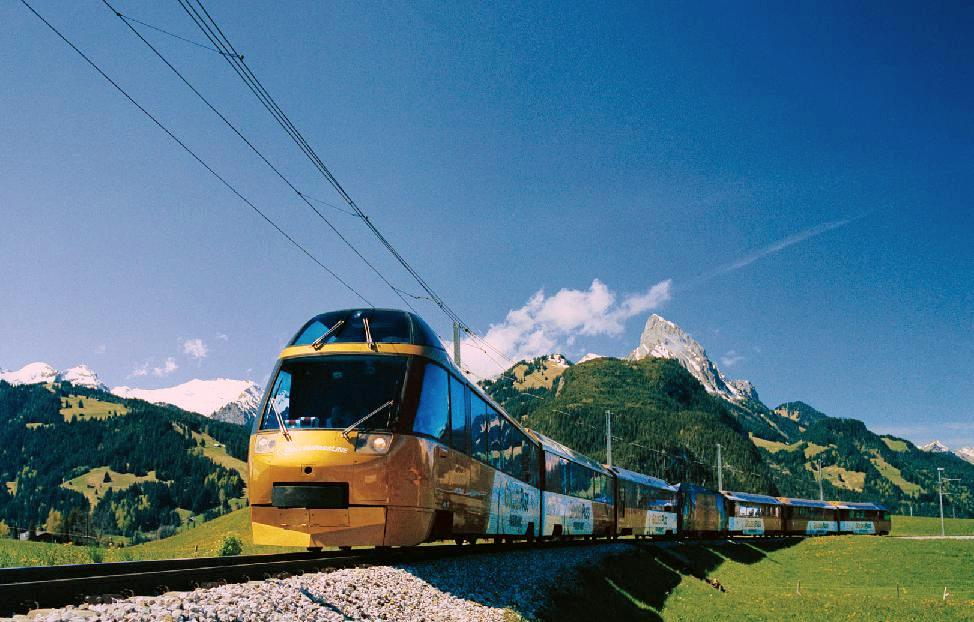
- The GoldenPass Panoramic near Gstaad

Overview
- Native name: German: Bahnstrecke Montreux-Gstaad-Zweisimmen–Lenk i.S., French: Ligne Montreux-Gstaad-Zweisimmen-Lenk i.S.
- Status: operating hourly services
- Owner: Montreux Oberland Bernois Railway (MOB)
- Locale: Vaud and Bernese Highlands
- Termini: Montreux; Lenk i.S.
- Stations: 36
- Website: MOB line

Service
- Services: 1
- Operator: Montreux Oberland Bernois Railway (MOB)

History
- Opened: 1901–1912

Technical
- Line length: 75.03 km (46.62 mi)
- Number of tracks: 1
- Character: commuter and touristic services
- Rack system: None
- Track gauge: 1,000 mm (3 ft 3 3/8 in) metre gauge
- Electrification: 900 V DC overhead line
- Highest elevation: 1,275 m (4,183 ft)
- Maximum incline: 73‰

The Montreux–Lenk im Simmental line is a metre-gauge electric railway line in Switzerland run by the Montreux Oberland Bernois Railway (MOB) and links Montreux on Lake Geneva by way of Les Avants, Montbovon, Rossinière, Château-d'Œx, Rougemont, Saanen, Gstaad and Zweisimmen with Lenk im Simmental. It leads through the cantons of Vaud, Fribourg and Bern. Running along the section between Montreux and Zweisimmen is the GoldenPass Line. The Montreux–Lenk line is one of the oldest electric railways in the country. Its main line, 75.1 km (46.7 mi) in length, is built to the 1,000 mm (3 ft 3 3/8 in) gauge. At Zweisimmen, passengers may transfer to the Spiez–Erlenbach–Zweisimmen line, a standard gauge line owned by BLS AG. A 12.9 km (8.0 mi) branch line also connects Zweisimmen to Lenk.

== History ==
The first section of line opened on 18 December 1901, between Montreux and Les Avants. The line was further extended from Les Avants to Montbovon on 1 October 1903, Chateau d'Œx on 19 August 1904, Gstaad on 20 December 1904, and Zweisimmen on 6 July 1905. The extension between Zweisimmen and Lenk im Simmental opened on 8 June 1912. Passenger service on the Lenk–Zweisimmen section was suspended between 1975 and 1979.

== Operations ==
Besides the GoldenPass Express, various regional trains run on the Montreux–Lenk im Simmental line:

- Panorama Express (PE) GoldenPass Express Montreux–Interlaken-East with stops in Montbovon, Château-d'Œx, Gstaad, Schönried, Saanenmöser, Zweisimmen, Boltigen, Erlenbach im Simmental, Oey-Diemtigen, Wimmis, Spiez and Interlaken-West. (This service transfers from meter gauge to standard gauge at Zweisimmen where the BLS AG takes over for the standard gauge part of the line)
- PE GoldenPass Panoramic and GoldenPass Belle Époque Montreux–Zweisimmen, between Fontanivent and Zweisimmen with stops (or request stops) at almost all stations (since December 2024 this service is registered as PE 30)
- Regio Montreux–Les Avants-(Château-d’Œx)
- Regio Gstaad–Zweisimmen
- Regio Zweisimmen–Lenk im Simmental

== Connecting lines ==
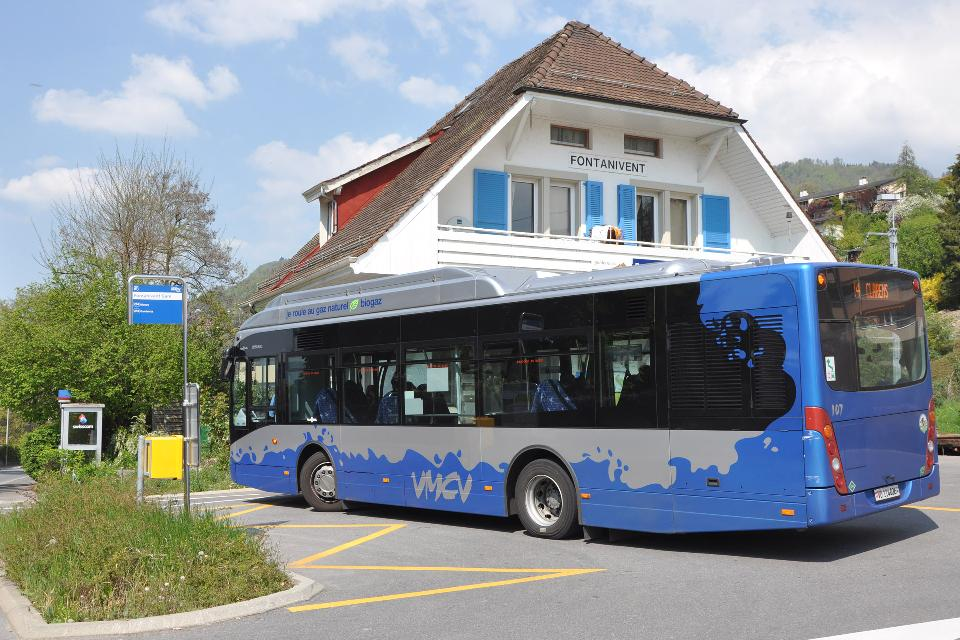
Fontanivent railway station; this is where the former Clarens-Chailly-Blonay railway branches off.

In Chamby, the former Chemins de fer électriques Veveysans (CEV) line to Blonay branches off the Montreux–Lenk im Simmental line. Since the 1966 suspension of passenger services on this line, the Blonay–Chamby Museum Railway has been running scheduled nostalgic trips on summer weekends. The line still belongs to Transports Montreux–Vevey–Riviera, the successor company to the CEV.

At Montbovon station, there is a connection with the Transports publics fribourgeois (TPF) network to Bulle, formerly the Chemins de fer fribourgeois Gruyère–Fribourg–Morat (GFM), and earlier still the Chemins de fer électriques de la Gruyère (CEG), to which the workshop in Montbovon belongs, and which also shares rolling stock with the MOB now and then.

At the time when both lines were being built, there arose a genuine fight between the Fribourg railway project initiators and the Vaud-Bern-governed MOB. The former submitted a request for a concession to build a railway to Zweisimmen, wanting, as they did, to run through trains from Bulle, and perhaps even from Vevey through Montbovon to Zweisimmen, and in so doing take along through-running stock from Montreux. In response, the Swiss Railway Department implemented on 23 June 1899 negotiations whose goal was to reach an agreement or compromise between the two initiative committees, and with the cantonal governments that were affected.

Since the Bern and Vaud cantonal governments supported the Montreux committee, the project initiators from Fribourg agreed to forgo the concession, but at the same time were given the right to build the station at Montbovon (which to this day belongs to the TPF). Still left open by the Federal representatives, though, was the question of who should get ownership of the short stretch of the line from Montbovon to the cantonal boundary just before La Tine (a hamlet in Rossinière). The Fribourg project initiators' concession request foresaw a tramway, whereas the one submitted by the group from Vaud foresaw a railway running on its own right-of-way. The Swiss Federal Council proposed to the Federal Assembly that the concession "from Montbovon or from the cantonal boundary" to Zweisimmen be granted so that both parties involved would have to agree contractually on whether one line or the other was to be built. Whatever they chose to do, however, the concession would also obligate the MOB to build the line so that the CEG's rolling stock could also run on it. The two parties were thereby obligated to apply the same standards. In the end, an agreement on 12 March 1907 regulating the unification of the MOB's and the CEG's lines laid out terms putting the ownership boundary 117 m from the arrival points at Château-d'Œx, and the CEG gave up its concession for the adjoining stretch of line.

Meeting the line at Zweisimmen station is the standard-gauge Spiez–Zweisimmen railway, run by BLS AG. It affords links with Interlaken, Lucerne, Brig and Bern.

Since the 11 December 2022 timetable changes there has been a direct connection from Interlaken by way of Zweisimmen to Montreux. Acquired for this purpose, for the first time, were trains whose bogies can automatically be adjusted from standard gauge to narrow gauge. From a tourism point of view, an onward trip to Lucerne on these trains would be desirable, but nevertheless not yet possible, as trains on the Brünig railway line not only need to be able to use metre gauge like the Montreux–Lenk im Simmental line, but also have to be equipped with cogs to engage the racks.

== See also ==
- List of heritage railways and funiculars in Switzerland
- List of narrow-gauge railways in Switzerland
- Montreux Oberland Bernois Railway (the company that owns the Montreux–Lenk im Simmental line)
