= Schwarzwasser (Sense) =

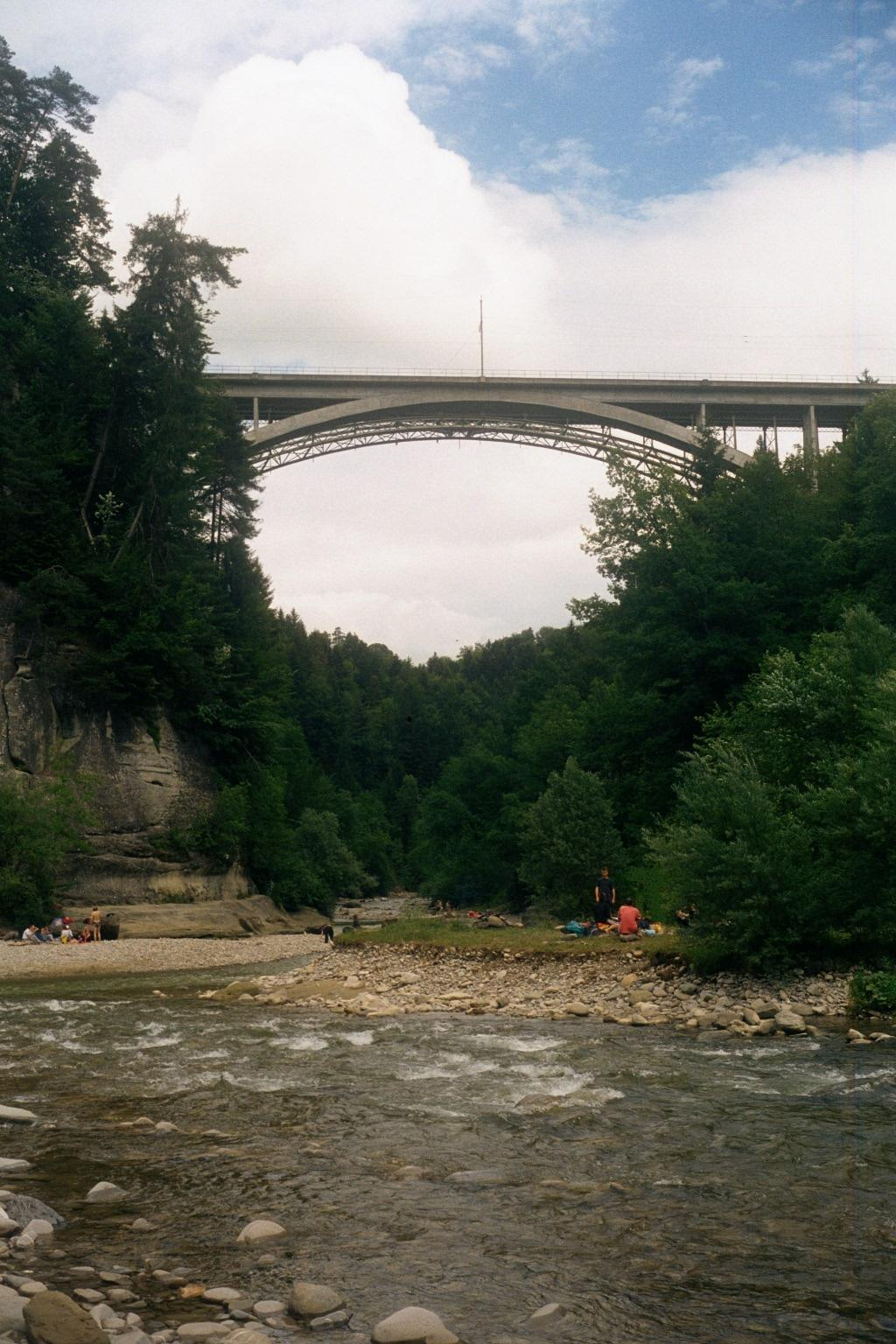
- Confluence of the Schwarzwasser with the Sense

Location
- Location: Kanton Bern; Schweiz
- Reference no.: CH: 452

Physical characteristics
- Source
  - location: Quellgebiet: near Rüschegg between the peaks of Pfyffe to the west and Schüpfenflue to the east
  - coordinates: 46°44′1″N 7°24′23″E
  - elevation: ca. 1,500 m above the sea
- Mouth
  - location: Sense
  - coordinates: 46°51′47″N 7°21′35″E
  - elevation: 577 m above the sea
- Length: 21.1 km

Basin features
- Progression: Sense → Saane → Aare → Rhein → Nordsee
- River system: Rhein

Schwarzwasser is an approximately 21.1 kilometre (13.3 mi) long right tributary of the Sense River in the canton of Bern in Switzerland. It drains a section of pre-Alpine hill country north of the Gantrisch chain and is part of the Rhine catchment area.

== Source area ==
The headwaters of the Schwarzwasser are located at approximately 1,500 m (4,900 ft) a.s.l. on the municipal land of Rüschegg north of the Gantrisch area. They originated in a basin on the northern slope of the Süftenegg, situated between the peaks of Pfyffe (1,666 m (5,466 ft) a.s.l.) to the west and Schüpfenflue (1,720 m (5,640 ft) a.s.l.) to the east. Over its first 5 km (3.1 mi), the Schwarzwasser torrent descends more than 700 m (2,300 ft); cutting through a notch valley that is deeply entrenched in the slope. At the base of the slope in the area of Heubach and Eigrund, the valley is filled with erosion material (boulders and gravel). Here, the Schwarzwasser joins the Wissenbach, the Biberze (both from the right) and the Gambach (from the left), all of which drain the Gurnigel area.

== See also ==
- List of rivers of Switzerland
