= Revolting Puppets =

Swiss band

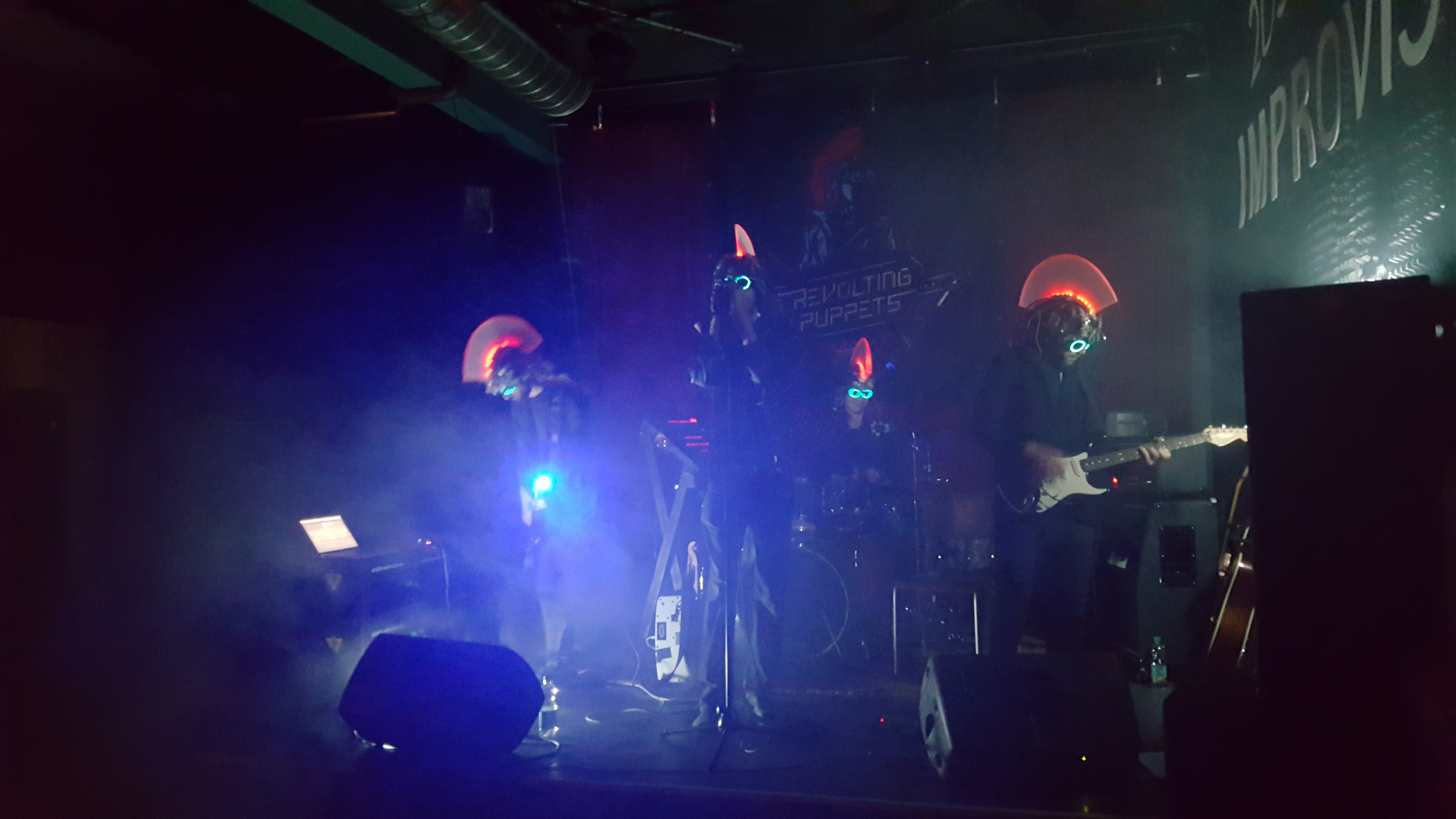
- Revolting Puppets in a concert in Huttwil in 2016

Background information
- Origin: Bern, Switzerland
- Genres: Alternative rock; punk rock; hard rock; post-punk
- Years active: 2014–present
- Labels: Pauli Punker Records, Rathouse Records
- Members: Tetsuo; Ceniza; V-Brain; Epsilon Minus
- Past members: Looper; Zuloid; Dr. Braindead; Chronomorph; Devoss; Sempione 101010
- Website: www.revoltingpuppets.com

Revolting Puppets are a punk band that formed in Bern, Switzerland in 2014. Revolting Puppets are a characteristic band in the cyberpunk scene and based in Switzerland, especially in Bern, where they have played in iconic concert halls like Reitschule.

The band has a characteristic cyberpunk style, which is particularly noticeable in their performances. The band wears very particular costumes, and helmets made with electronic elements and LED illuminated glasses.

The band has a classic punk sound mixed with electronic tones, and also adds elements of noise and synthwave.

== Style ==
=== Musical style ===
Revolting Puppets are characterized by a mixture of styles in a very aggressive way, so while punk influence seems to prevail, there are many purely electronic effects and a strong influence of rock. Moreover, according to their cyberpunk style, the band uses chiptune effects to generate a retro style sound.

This eclectic musical style can also be appreciated in the band influences, since the band quotes as its inspirations not only classic rock bands like Pink Floyd, but also contemporary bands like Daft Punk.

=== Revolting Puppets universe ===
The Revolting Puppets have created a parallel universe around the band. In this fictional world, an evil elite, known as the M-Pire, rules all aspects of society and oppresses the weak. This Orwellian view of the world connects with our own world, and is used as a hyperbole to highlight where our society could become.

We can't bear living in the world, the M-Pire has created for us. A world, where people live in golden cages, losing any sense of humanity. A world, so shallow and artificial, so cold and grey.

With happy thoughts only, there is no room for improvement. Mankind is standing still. And innocent people die and no one cares.

We must bring back the stuff that touched the heart. That made us think, sad, angry. That provoked us, gave us a new view.

— Revolting Puppets Manifest

This clear cyberpunk vision is a symbol of the social engagement of the band, with frequent political allusions in its concerts and also with some songs like Dear MTV, openly critical with the evolution of MTV's musical selection which is a metaphor for modern society decadence.
