= Selibüel =

Mountain in Switzerland

- Location within Switzerland

Highest point
- Elevation: 1,750 m (5,740 ft)
- Prominence: 170 m (560 ft)
- Parent peak: Schafberg
- Coordinates: 46°43′54″N 07°26′19″E

Geography
- Location: Bern, Switzerland
- Parent range: Bernese Alps

The Selibüel is a mountain of the Bernese Alpine foothills, located in the municipality of Rüschegg in the canton of Bern. It is the culminating point of the wooded range that lies north of the Gurnigel Pass, between the valleys of the Sense (west) and the Aare (east). The summit area, as well as the other summits of the range, such as the Pfyffe, is easily accessible by car or by bus via the Gurnigel road.
