= Merz (musician) =

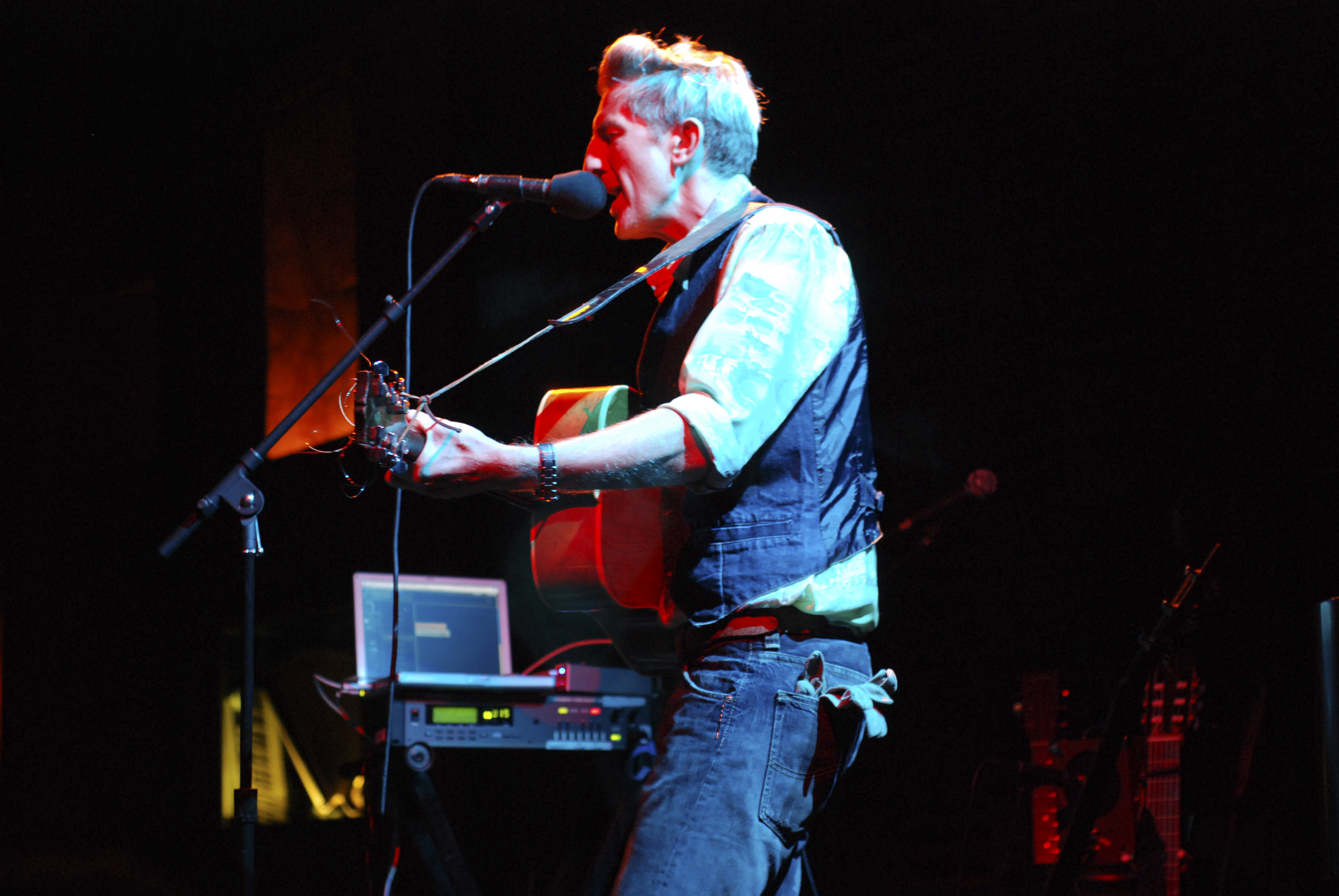
- Merz performing in 2008

Background information
- Born: Conrad Lambert
- Origin: Dorset, England
- Genres: Alternative, electronica, folk
- Years active: 1996–present
- Labels: Epic (1998–2001); Grönland (2004–2009); Accidental (2012–present)
- Website: merz.co.uk

Conrad Ewart Lambert, better known as "Merz" is an English multi-instrumentalist, singer and songwriter. He has released seven albums.

== Biography ==
Born Conrad Lambert in Dorset, England, he grew up in West Bretton & Huddersfield, Yorkshire and moved to London in 1992.

Merz had three hits in 1999/2000 on the UK Singles Chart with Many Weathers Apart, Lovely Daughter and Lotus. 25 October 1999 his eponymous debut album was released on Epic Records. The album combined elements of 90's electronica with strains of pastoral folk and drew wide critical acclaim. However, the commercial success which had been predicted by many in the music industry and press failed to materialise, and Merz withdrew from his recording contract with Epic's parent company, Sony BMGin 2001.

His second album, Loveheart, surfaced five years later on the independent Grönland label. It also won plaudits, was well received in the music press and re-established Merz as a singular British musician.

Subsequently Merz toured UK & Europe extensively, played at festivals as diverse as UK's Green Man Festival, Montreux Jazz Festival in Switzerland and SXSW in USA. More acclaim followed in the US, where the track Dangerous Heady Love Scheme was iTunes Single of the Week, and Postcard From A Dark Star, Presume Too Much, Toy, Credo, Serene, Somewhere To Run and Juniper were all selected as ‘Today's Top Tune’ on influential LA radio station KCRW.

The third Merz album Moi et Mon Camion (2008) was written on the move, as Merz was relocating from Bristol to the English coast to the rural city of Bath then subsequently to Bern the capital city of Switzerland. The album features two collaborations with Paul Hartnoll of Orbital.

Recorded at Peter Gabriel's Real World Studios just outside Bath, Rockfield Studios in Wales, produced with Bruno Ellingham the record features a few notable musicians: Charlie Jones, some time bass player with Robert Plant & Jimmy Page and Goldfrapp, Clive Deamer, drummer for Portishead and Radiohead, with The Earlies guesting on backing vocals. This third album also gained Merz much critical acclaim and saw Merz undertake his first pan-USA tour.

In 2012 Merz recorded his fourth album No Compass Will Find Home collaborating with electronic music pioneer Matthew Herbert on the production and mix. It was released in UK January 2013 by Accidental Records. Again the UK press praised the album, The Sunday Times making it Album of the Week calling it a 'must buy' record. The Xynthia EP was released around the same time containing additional songs and a haunting Dimlite remix of The Hunting Owl.

On 27 September 2013 Merz, along with musicians Shahzad Ismaily and Julian Sartorius, performed a show in London consisting of only one song: Many Weathers Apart. Variations and extemporizations on elements of the original song and its ten different remixes were incorporated into a forty-five minute set. It marked 15 years since the original release of the record.

In November 2013 a Drum and Vocal Renditions version of Merz's album No Compass Will Find Home was released by drummer/sound artist Julian Sartorius. Only the vocals from the original album were used to re-create the songs in drum and percussion arrangements. This record was released by Merz and Sartorius' respective labels Accidental Records and Everest Records. The album was toured as Merz feat. Sartorius Drum Ensemble with a line-up of four drummers (directed by Sartorius) and Merz on vocals.

November 2015 Accidental Records released the fifth Merz album Thinking Like A Mountain, mixed by Matthew Herbert and featuring collaborations with musicians Shahzad Ismaily, Julian Sartorius, Dimlite, Gyda Valtysdottir and Ewan Pearson. Mojo Magazine called it “Merz's brave new beginning”. Uncut wrote “Strong return. Intimate ambient sophistication.” Upon release it became one of the most played albums on KCRW Radio.

In June 2018 Merz created a performance titled A Monastic Gig (the title an homage to the Alice Coltrane album A Monastic Trio) and invited the American musician Laraaji and American visual artist Jed Ochmanek to join in the collaboration.

The event was held at Dampfzentrale Bern, transforming the ex-power station venue into a monastic vault. This atypical concert, featuring the live music created by Laraaji and Merz and the art, film and set design of Jed Ochmanek engineered an atmosphere similar to recitals in churches: calm, sublimity, respect, humility; free of old-world religiousness and iconography. The audience were requested to enter the hall in silence, listen and observe in silence and leave the hall in silence.

June 2019 Merz released Dreams of Sleep and Wakes of Sound, a collaborative, mainly instrumental album containing music created with both Laraaji and Shahzad Ismaily respectively. Described by Electronic Sound Mag as “A rewardingly singular and cerebral work that impresses hugely” the album was selected as The Guardian newspaper’s Contemporary Album of the Week. The cover art and double vinyl gatefold art was created and designed by Jed Ochmanek and Swiss design collective Maison Standard.

Released on 7th October 2025, a new single, Juniper marked the beginning of a new era of Merz releases. The song speaks to a summoning of moral clarity, resolve and action. This was followed by the single Times and in August '26 the Mystery City Pizza Delivery E.P.

Merz has also co-written, appeared as a vocalist and musician with Victoria Williams, Fred Frith, Arto Lindsay, Orbital (band), Guy Called Gerald, Tom Middleton, Maxim (The Prodigy), Leftfield, Lemn Sissay, Leo Abrahams, Dive Index, Dan Le Sac, Dorit Chrysler, Tythe, Anne Marie Almedal, Manuel Troller, has created remixes for Matthew Herbert, Dan Le Sac, Hayley Ross, produced the debut album of the band Jon Hood, and has lectured a songwriting masterclass at the Lucerne University of Applied Sciences and Arts.

Merz was the 2018–20 Associated Artist at the Dampfzentrale Centre for Music and Contemporary Dance.

He is currently based in Joshua Tree, California & Kent, England.

== Discography ==
=== Albums ===
- Merz (1999), Epic Records
- Loveheart (2005), Grönland
- Moi et Mon Camion (2008), Grönland
- No Compass Will Find Home (2013), Accidental
- No Compass Will Find Home (Julian Sartorius Drum and Vocal Renditions) (2013), Accidental, Everest Records
- Thinking Like a Mountain (2015), Accidental
- iNK (2016) CDr self-release
- Dreams of Sleep and Wakes of Sound – with Laraaji and Shahzad Ismaily (2019) Dampfzentrale.

=== EPs ===
- CC Conscious EP (1998)
- Many Weathers Apart (1999)
- Lovely Daughter (1999)
- Lotus EP (2000)
- Postcard From A Dark Star (2006)
- Silver Tree EP (2006)
- Presume Too Much (2008)
- Daytrotter Session (2009)
- Xynthia EP (2012)
- Amber Green Red EP (2016) CDr self-release
- DOSAWOS Songs (2019)
- Mystery City Pizza Delivery E.P. (2026)
