= Moritz Probst =

Swiss civil engineer (1838–1916)

- Born: August 10, 1838; Berne, Switzerland
- Died: May 18, 1916 (aged 77); Berne, Switzerland
- Occupation: Civil engineer
- Known for: Large-span hinged metal arch bridges
- Spouse: Maria Schärer (m. 1869)

Moritz Probst (10 August 1838 – 18 May 1916) was a Swiss civil engineer known for his work on railway and road bridges, and for introducing large-span hingeless metal arch bridges in Switzerland. He was a member of the Radical party and served on both the executive and legislative bodies of the city of Berne.

== Life ==
Probst was born on 10 August 1838 in Berne, the son of Jakob Probst, an accountant, and Katharina Müller. He grew up in Romainmôtier. While working at the Société centrale de navigation in Yverdon, he studied as a self-taught student before enrolling at the ETH Zurich (then known as the Eidgenössische Polytechnische Schule), where he obtained his diploma in 1861. He was Protestant and originated from Ins. In 1869, he married Maria Schärer, daughter of Friedrich Schärer.

== Career ==
After graduating, Probst worked as a mechanical engineer in Berlin (1863), then in Dorsten (Westphalia). From 1869, he worked for G. Ott & Cie in Berne. In 1885, he founded the firm Probst, Chappuis & Wolf in Nidau. In 1907, this firm merged with Conrad Zschokke's company to form the Société des ateliers réunis de Nidau et Döttingen.

Probst built numerous railway and road bridges and introduced large-span hingeless metal arch bridges in Switzerland. Notable examples include the Javroz bridge near Charmey, the Schwarzwasser bridge, and the Kirchenfeld bridge in Berne.

From 1883 to 1894, Probst served as a voluntary member of the executive and legislative bodies of the city of Berne, as a member of the Radical Party. In 1905, he received an honorary doctorate from the University of Zurich.

He died on 18 May 1916 in Berne.

== Bibliography ==
- Der Bund, 22 May 1916
- Revue polytechnique suisse, 67, 1916, no. 22, pp. 262–263
- INSA, vol. 2, p. 397
