= Eduard Joos =

Swiss architect (1869–1917)

- Born: February 10, 1869; Schaffhausen, Switzerland
- Died: May 18, 1917 (aged 48); Bern, Switzerland
- Occupation: Architect
- Known for: Buildings in Bern, including the north wing of the Federal Palace and the Swiss National Bank building
- Spouse: Virginie Ida Probst (m. 1898, daughter of Moritz Probst)

Eduard Joos (10 February 1869 – 18 May 1917) was a Swiss architect based in Bern, known for designing several major buildings that shaped the upper part of Bern's old town. He was the son of Robert Joos, a cantonal treasurer, and was a member of the Protestant community of Schaffhausen.

== Education and early career ==
Joos attended a technical school (Realschule) and completed a carpentry apprenticeship in Schaffhausen, before training as a construction technician at the Winterthur technicum from 1887. From 1889, he undertook practical internships in Bern, Zurich, and Aarau. He then studied at the École des Beaux-Arts in Paris (1892–1894), during which time he completed commissions for several architects in the city.

== Career ==
After returning from Paris, Joos joined the architectural firm of Alfred Hodler in Bern, first as a site manager and later as a partner. Together with Hodler, he entered various competitions; in 1898 they won first prize for the University of Bern building. His earliest independent buildings were constructed in Bern and Schaffhausen. He opened his own practice in 1901.

Joos designed numerous significant buildings in Bern that have had a lasting impact on the character of the upper old town, including the north wing of the Federal Palace, the Swiss National Bank building, the Cantonal Mortgage Bank, the Kaiser and Au Bon Marché department stores, a commercial building at the Zytglogge, a gas works, and the development of the Wander factory. His work extended beyond Bern: he designed the secondary school (collège) in Colombier (NE), the Cantonal Bank and the machine hall of the electricity plant in Schaffhausen, and the railway station in Spiez. He also received several commissions for the Swiss National Exhibition of 1914, as well as projects for monuments and bridges.

Joos served as vice-president and president of the Bernese Society of Engineers and Architects (Berner Ingenieur- und Architektenvereins). From 1913, he was a member of the Bern city council (legislative body) as a Radical member.

== Bibliography ==
- Aerni, A., «Eduard Joos», in Schaffhauser Beiträge zur Geschichte, 68, 1991, pp. 94–104.
- Architekt des Bundesplatzes: Ed. Joos 1869–1917, 1992.
- Architektenlexikon, p. 299.
