= Oberwil im Simmental =

- Municipality
- Flag Coat of arms
- Location of Oberwil im Simmental
- Location within Switzerland Location within Canton of Bern
- Coordinates: 46°39′N 7°26′E
- Country: Switzerland
- Canton: Bern
- District: Frutigen-Niedersimmental

Government
  - Executive: Gemeinderat with 7 members
  - Mayor: Gemeindepräsident(in); Bernhard Gerber (as of 2026)

Area
  - Total: 46.0 km^{2} (17.8 sq mi)
- Elevation: 836 m (2,743 ft)

Population (December 2020)
  - Total: 804
  - Density: 17.5/km^{2} (45.3/sq mi)
- Time zone: UTC+01:00 (CET)
  - Summer (DST): UTC+02:00 (CEST)
- Postal code: 3765
- SFOS number: 766
- ISO 3166 code: CH-BE
- Surrounded by: Boltigen, Därstetten, Diemtigen, Guggisberg, Plaffeien (FR), Rüschegg
- Website: www.oberwil-im-simmental.ch

Oberwil im Simmental is a municipality in the Frutigen-Niedersimmental administrative district in the canton of Bern in Switzerland.

== History ==
Oberwil is first mentioned in 1278 as Oberwile.

During the Paleolithic era (20,000-10,000 BC) humans lived in several caves above the valley floor during the summer. The caves, Schnurenloch, Mamilchloch, Zwergliloch and Chniechälebalm, contained about 5,000 bones from the now extinct cave bear which the inhabitants had butchered. While no human remains were discovered, a number of stone tools were found. Today the tools and bones are at the Historical Museum of Bern, while the caves can be visited with tour groups. These caves and other nearby rock shelters continued to be used through the Neolithic, the late Bronze Age and into the Middle Ages. After the collapse of the Western Roman Empire, Alamanni tribes settled in the Simmen valley and established villages and alpine pastures.

In 994, the royal estate at Wimmis and part of Oberwil was donated to Selz Abbey in Alsace. In 1276, Wimmis and Oberwil were given to the new Augustinian Därstetten priory. During the Middle Ages, two castles, Festi and Heidenmauer were built above the valley floor. However, no records of the castles are still in existence, and both have fallen into ruin. By the 12th century the remaining settlements and land were owned by the Freiherr von Weissenburg. In 1439, all the Weissenburg lands, including Oberwil and the surrounding settlements, were acquired by Bern. During the 16th century the entire Simmen valley converted from subsistence agriculture to raising cattle and producing cheese from milk. Today, while the municipality has some small businesses and tourism, the main industry is still agriculture.

The village church of St. Mauritius was built by the Freiherr von Weissenburg and is first mentioned in 1228. The original church was expanded in the 14th and 15th centuries.

== Geography ==
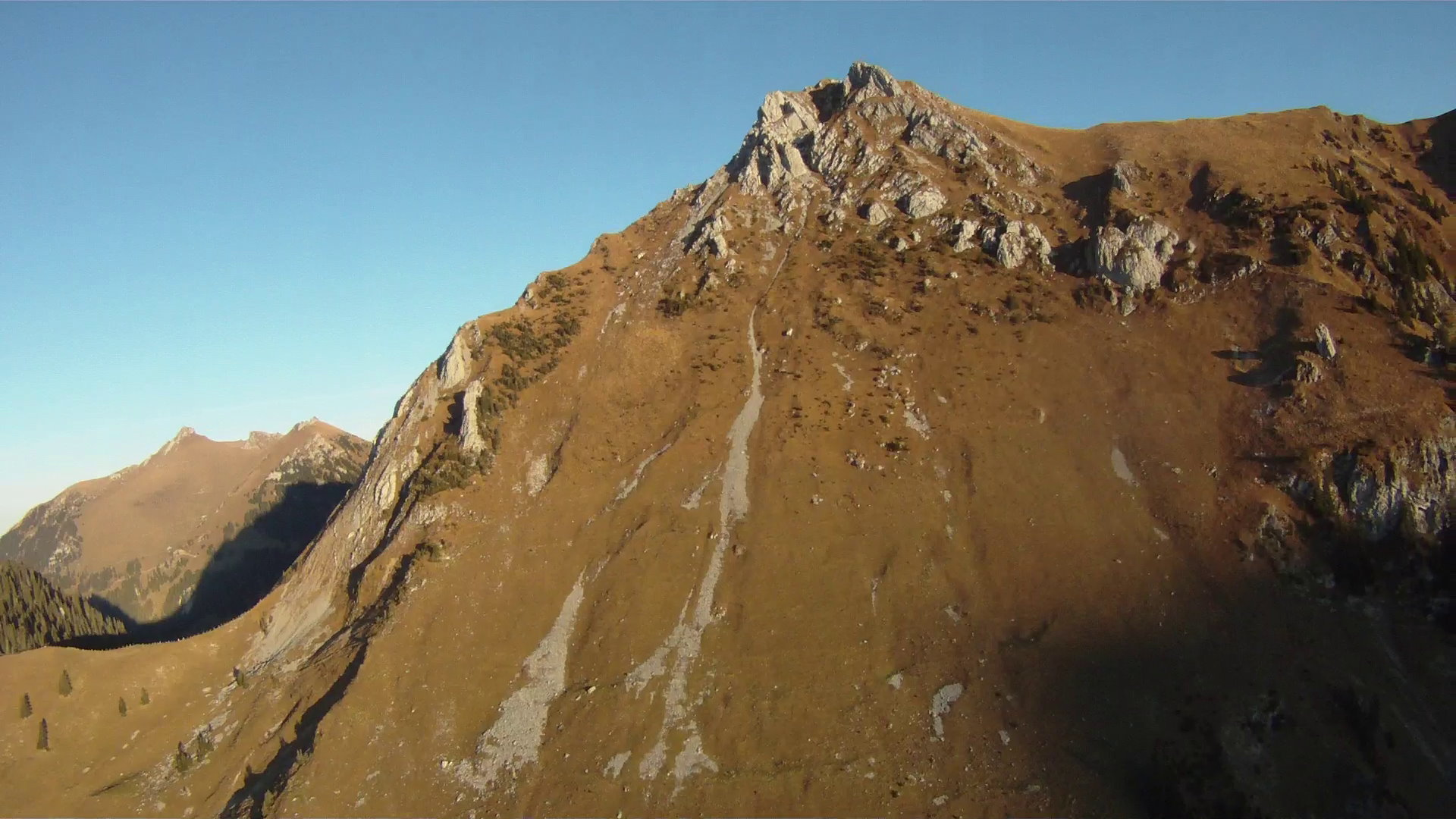
Märe peak on the border of Canton Bern and Canton Fribourg, in the municipality of Oberwil

Oberwil im Simmental has an area of 46.06 km^{2} (17.78 sq mi). As of 2012, a total of 23.69 km^{2} (9.15 mi^{2}) or 51.4% is used for agricultural purposes, while 15.57 km^{2} (6.01 mi^{2}) or 33.8% is forested. The rest of the municipality is 1.16 km^{2} (0.45 mi^{2}) or 2.5% is settled (buildings or roads), 0.28 km^{2} (0.11 mi^{2}) or 0.6% is either rivers or lakes and 5.3 km^{2} (2.0 mi^{2}) or 11.5% is unproductive land.

During the same year, housing and buildings made up 1.1% and transportation infrastructure made up 1.3%. A total of 27.6% of the total land area is heavily forested and 5.6% is covered with orchards or small clusters of trees. Of the agricultural land, 18.8% is pasturage and 32.5% is used for alpine pastures. All the water in the municipality is flowing water. Of the unproductive areas, 7.3% is unproductive vegetation and 4.2% is too rocky for vegetation.

The large municipality spreads across much of the Simmental (Simmen valley) and the meadows and forests of the surrounding mountains. It consists of the Bäuerten (farming collectives) of Oberwil, Hintereggen, Pfaffenried, Bunschen and Waldried.

On 31 December 2009 Amtsbezirk Niedersimmental, the municipality's former district, was dissolved. On the following day, 1 January 2010, it joined the newly created Verwaltungskreis Frutigen-Niedersimmental.

== Coat of arms ==
The blazon of the municipal coat of arms is Per fess Argent a Castle Gules and Vert.

== Demographics ==
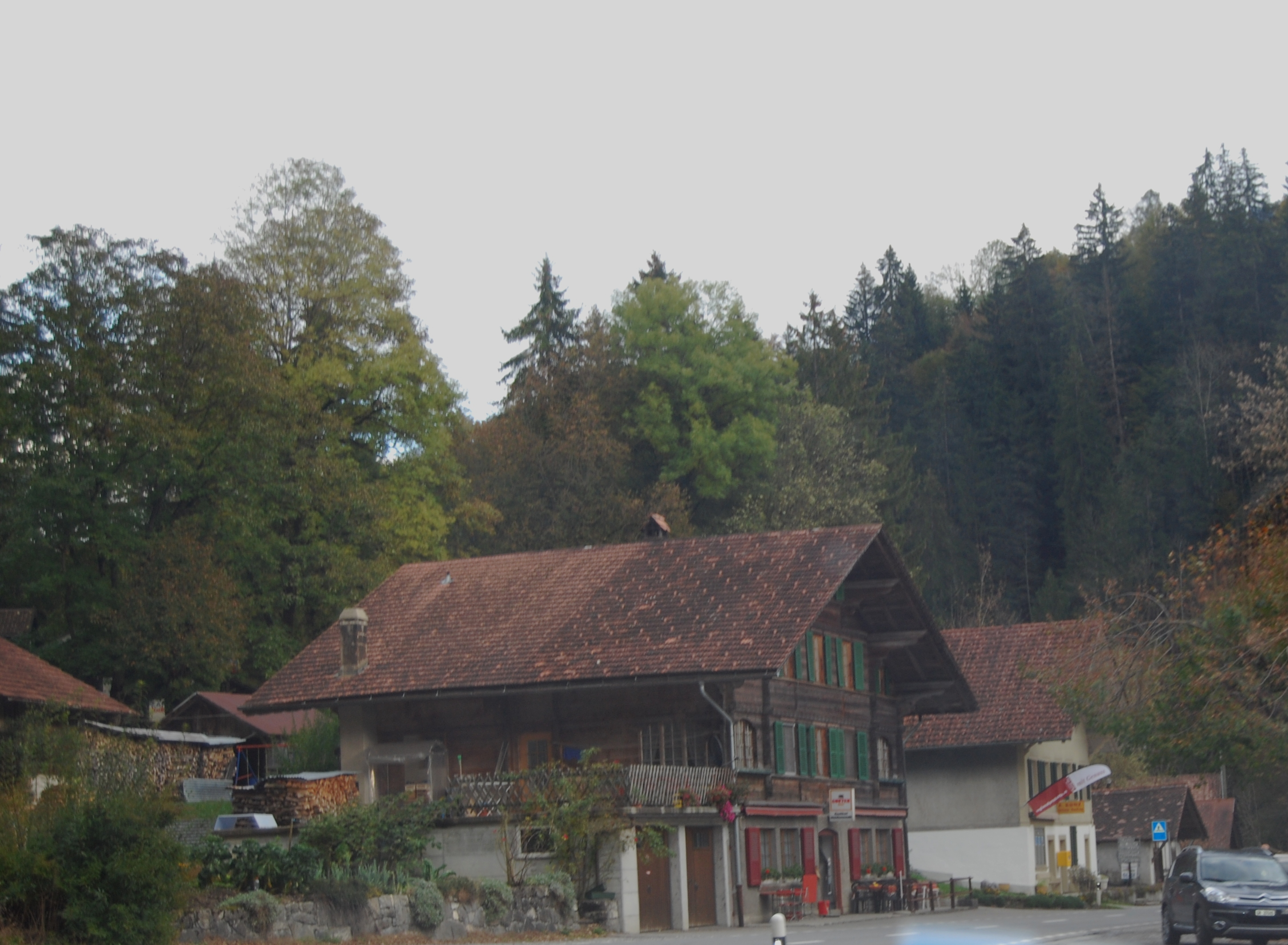
Houses in Oberwil

Oberwil im Simmental has a population (as of December 2020) of 804. As of 2010, 3.6% of the population are resident foreign nationals. Over the last 10 years (2001-2011) the population has changed at a rate of -1.4%. Migration accounted for -1.6%, while births and deaths accounted for 0%.

Most of the population (as of 2000) speaks German (796 or 99.1%) as their first language. There is one person who speaks French and one that speaks Romansh.

As of 2008, the population was 50.7% male and 49.3% female. The population was made up of 394 Swiss men (48.9% of the population) and 14 (1.7%) non-Swiss men. There were 382 Swiss women (47.5%) and 15 (1.9%) non-Swiss women. Of the population in the municipality, 514 or about 64.0% were born in Oberwil im Simmental and lived there in 2000. There were 222 or 27.6% who were born in the same canton, while 31 or 3.9% were born somewhere else in Switzerland, and 19 or 2.4% were born outside of Switzerland.

As of 2011, children and teenagers (0–19 years old) make up 20.3% of the population, while adults (20–64 years old) make up 55.7% and seniors (over 64 years old) make up 24.1%.

As of 2000, there were 295 people who were single and never married in the municipality. There were 437 married individuals, 61 widows or widowers and 10 individuals who are divorced.

As of 2010, there were 83 households that consist of only one person and 28 households with five or more people. In 2000, a total of 284 apartments (64.5% of the total) were permanently occupied, while 115 apartments (26.1%) were seasonally occupied and 41 apartments (9.3%) were empty. As of 2010, the construction rate of new housing units was 1.2 new units per 1000 residents. The vacancy rate for the municipality, in 2012, was 2.38%. In 2011, single family homes made up 44.0% of the total housing in the municipality.

The historical population is given in the following chart:

== Heritage sites of national significance ==
The Venner house is listed as a Swiss heritage site of national significance. The entire village of Oberwil im Simmental and the hamlet of Pfaffenried are part of the Inventory of Swiss Heritage Sites.

== Politics ==
In the 2011 federal election the most popular party was the Swiss People's Party (SVP) which received 61.9% of the vote. The next three most popular parties were the Federal Democratic Union of Switzerland (EDU) (13.8%), the Conservative Democratic Party (BDP) (11.3%) and the Social Democratic Party (SP) (5.3%). In the federal election, a total of 365 votes were cast, and the voter turnout was 56.0%.

== Economy ==
As of 2011, Oberwil im Simmental had an unemployment rate of 0.73%. As of 2008, there were a total of 349 people employed in the municipality. Of these, there were 220 people employed in the primary economic sector and about 84 businesses involved in this sector. 65 people were employed in the secondary sector and there were 14 businesses in this sector. 64 people were employed in the tertiary sector, with 19 businesses in this sector. There were 394 residents of the municipality who were employed in some capacity, of which females made up 39.1% of the workforce.

In 2008 there were a total of 244 full-time equivalent jobs. The number of jobs in the primary sector was 140, all of which were in agriculture. The number of jobs in the secondary sector was 58 of which 16 or (27.6%) were in manufacturing and 41 (70.7%) were in construction. The number of jobs in the tertiary sector was 46. In the tertiary sector; 18 or 39.1% were in wholesale or retail sales or the repair of motor vehicles, 7 or 15.2% were in the movement and storage of goods, 12 or 26.1% were in a hotel or restaurant, 2 or 4.3% were the insurance or financial industry, and 1 was a technical professional or scientist.

In 2000, there were 29 workers who commuted into the municipality and 142 workers who commuted away. The municipality is a net exporter of workers, with about 4.9 workers leaving the municipality for every one entering. A total of 252 workers (89.7% of the 281 total workers in the municipality) both lived and worked in Oberwil im Simmental. Of the working population, 10.7% used public transportation to get to work, and 48% used a private car.

In 2011 the average local and cantonal tax rate on a married resident, with two children, of Oberwil im Simmental making 150,000 CHF was 12.7%, while an unmarried resident's rate was 18.7%. For comparison, the average rate for the entire canton in the same year, was 14.2% and 22.0%, while the nationwide average was 12.3% and 21.1% respectively. In 2009 there were a total of 291 tax payers in the municipality. Of that total, 43 made over 75,000 CHF per year. There were 9 people who made between 15,000 and 20,000 per year. The greatest number of workers, 91, made between 50,000 and 75,000 CHF per year. The average income of the over 75,000 CHF group in Oberwil im Simmental was 106,435 CHF, while the average across all of Switzerland was 130,478 CHF.

In 2011 a total of 1.1% of the population received direct financial assistance from the government.

== Religion ==
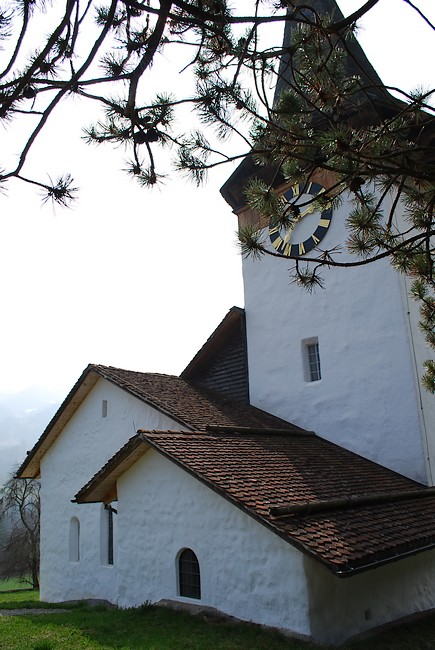
Village church in Oberwil

From the 2000 census, 692 or 86.2% belonged to the Swiss Reformed Church, while 14 or 1.7% were Roman Catholic. Of the rest of the population, there were 2 members of an Orthodox church (or about 0.25% of the population), and there were 64 individuals (or about 7.97% of the population) who belonged to another Christian church. There was 1 individual who was Islamic. There were 2 individuals who belonged to another church. 12 (or about 1.49% of the population) belonged to no church, are agnostic or atheist, and 16 individuals (or about 1.99% of the population) did not answer the question.

== Transport ==
Oberwil im Simmental sits on the Spiez–Zweisimmen line and is served by trains at the Oberwil im Simmental and Enge im Simmental railway stations.

== Education ==
In Oberwil im Simmental about 44.5% of the population have completed non-mandatory upper secondary education, and 5.3% have completed additional higher education (either university or a Fachhochschule). Of the 24 who had completed some form of tertiary schooling listed in the census, 87.5% were Swiss men, 12.5% were Swiss women.

The Canton of Bern school system provides one year of non-obligatory Kindergarten, followed by six years of Primary school. This is followed by three years of obligatory lower Secondary school where the students are separated according to ability and aptitude. Following the lower Secondary students may attend additional schooling or they may enter an apprenticeship.

During the 2011-12 school year, there were a total of 63 students attending classes in Oberwil im Simmental. There was one kindergarten class with a total of 7 students in the municipality. The municipality had 2 primary classes and 47 students. During the same year, there was one lower secondary class with a total of 9 students.

As of 2000, there were a total of 18 students attending any school in the municipality. Of those, 17 both lived and attended school in the municipality, while one student came from another municipality. During the same year, 81 residents attended schools outside the municipality.
