= Pfyffe =

Mountain in Switzerland

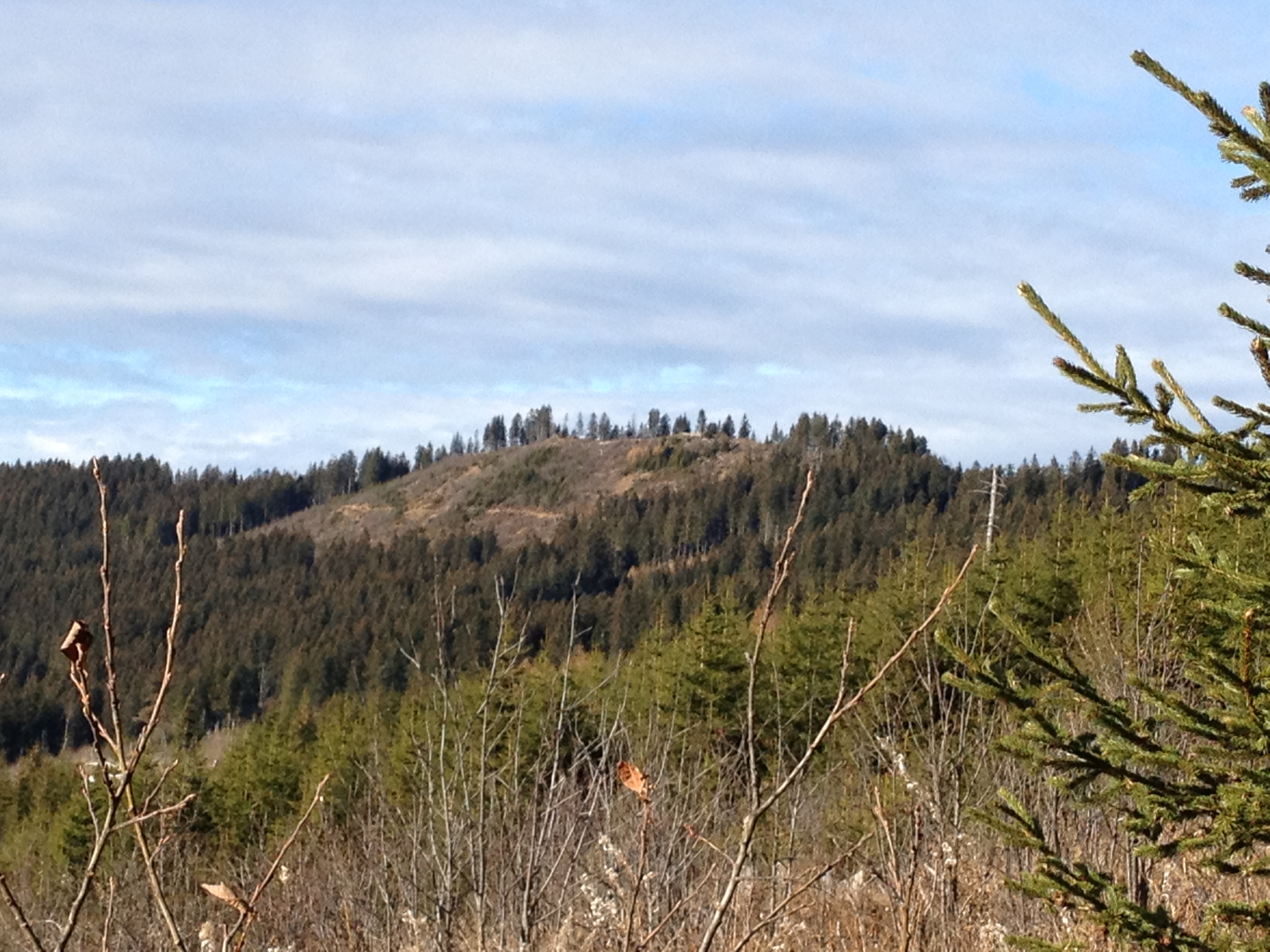
- The Pfyffe from the southeast

Highest point
- Elevation: 1,666 m (5,466 ft)
- Prominence: 131 m (430 ft)
- Coordinates: 46°44′29″N 7°22′19″E

Geography
- Location within Switzerland
- Location: Bern, Switzerland
- Parent range: Bernese Alps

The Pfyffe is a mountain of the Bernese Alpine foothills located between the municipalities of Guggisberg and Rüschegg in the canton of Bern. It is part of the wooded range north of the Gurnigel Pass, which culminates at the Selibüel. On the southern slopes of the mountain lies the small resort of Ottenleuebad (1,430 m).
