= Dive Index =

American musical project

Dive Index is a collaborative musical project originated by Los Angeles-based electronic music composer/producer Will Thomas.

== History ==
Thomas has released minimalist electronic music under the name Plumbline on the Hydrogen Dukebox label. His recordings include Circles (2003), PinPoints (2004) the RePointed EP (2005) and two Roger Eno collaborations: Transparencies (2006), and Endless City/Concrete Garden (2013). All Dive Index albums so far have been released on the Los Angeles-based indie label Neutral Music.

=== Mid/Air ===
Co-written and produced by Thomas, Dive Index debut Mid/Air was released in September 2007. The album features vocal contributions from Natalie Walker, Merz, Cat Martino, and Ian Masters, with musical contributors including Kevin O'Donnell, Timothy O'Donnell, Antony and the Johnsons' members Julia Kent and Maxim Moston, CJ Camerieri, David Shaw and Roger Eno.

The packaging for 'Mid/Air' was designed by Timothy O'Donnell, known for his work at the 4AD Records' design studio, v23. O'Donnell has designed sleeves for Lush, GusGus, Bauhaus, His Name Is Alive, Bush and many others.

In September 2008, Collisions - The Mid/Air Remixes was released and contains remixes by Tunng, The Album Leaf, Jason Bentley, Beat Pharmacy, AlphaMotive, Tiny Mile, and Roger Eno + Plumbline

=== The Surface We Divide ===
Once again co-written and produced by Thomas, The Surface We Divide was released in 2010. It features vocals by Joseph Arthur, Patrick Cooper, Mark Gardener (from Ride) and Cat Martino, as well as instrumental contributions from Kevin O'Donnell (drums) and Julia Kent (cello). The cover image was designed by Jason Munn of the Small Stakes design studio, with the rest of the layout designed by Timothy O'Donnell.

The Surface We Divide has been released as a download, on CD, and on 500-copy limited edition double vinyl (which includes bonus song "Balance").

=== Remixes and Covers ===
In 2009 Dive Index did a remix version of Natalie Walker's song "With You".

In 2010, Hydrogen Dukebox records released the compilation album "Sing & Play", that features Plumbline covering the Talking Heads classic "Once In a Lifetime" and Dive Index covering Buzzcocks' "Harmony in My Head".

=== Lost in the Pressure ===
Dive Index returned in 2014 with Lost in the Pressure. Written and recorded in New York City and Los Angeles, the album features vocals from Simone White and Isaiah Gage. With arrangements incorporating piano, cello (played by Alison Chesley), guitars, found sounds, and a blend of live and electronic percussion, the songs on Lost in the Pressure explore the sensations of being vulnerable and adrift.

=== Waving At Airplanes ===
Released in 2020, Waving At Airplanes is Dive Index’s fifth full-length album. Co-written and produced by Thomas, and recorded mostly in his L.A. studio, vocals on the album are shared between Natalie Walker and Merz (the latter contributing remotely, from his Joshua Tree studio). Waving At Airplanes was mastered by multiple Grammy nominee Mike Bozzi at Bernie Grundman Mastering in Hollywood. The album’s artwork was once again designed by Timothy O’Donnell.
