= Natalie Walker =

American musician

- Born: Natalie Denise Walker
- Origin: Indianapolis, Indiana, US
- Genres: Electronica; trip hop; pop; indie rock
- Occupation: Musician
- Instrument: Vocals
- Years active: 2002–present
- Labels: Plain Jane; Dorado
- Member of: Mouchette
- Formerly of: Daughter Darling
- Website: natalie-walker.com

Natalie Denise Walker is an American singer and songwriter from Indiana who first came to prominence as part of the group Daughter Darling. She later launched a solo career on Dorado Records and released her first studio album, Urban Angel, in 2006, which was produced by the duo Stuhr (Dan Chen and Nate Greenberg). Walker's follow-up, With You, was released in 2008 and also featured production by Stuhr. She has since released the albums Spark (2011) and Strange Bird (2015). Walker also sings with the group Mouchette, with whom she has released two EPs and one full-length album.

== Biography ==
Growing up in a born again Christian family, Walker spent her childhood in Indianapolis, Indiana. She formed her first band, a funk-folk outfit, at the age of seventeen. She has cited Beth Gibbons, Beth Orton, Karin Bergquist, Alison Krauss, Ani DiFranco, Björk, Erin McKeown, Jewel, Lauryn Hill, and Garbage as musical influences.

=== Daughter Darling ===
Travis and Steven Fogelman of the trip hop group Daughter Darling had posted an online ad seeking a vocalist, which Walker answered. She sent them a vocal sample, and they expressed interest in hiring her. In 2002, a year after answering the ad, Walker left college and moved to Philadelphia, and the band recorded the album Sweet Shadows. Though a subsequent release was discussed, Walker decided to launch a solo career instead.

=== Solo career ===
In 2006, Walker released her debut album, Urban Angel, co-written with the production duo Stuhr, consisting of Dan Chen and Nate Greenberg. A Thievery Corporation remix of the track "Quicksand" was featured in the Sofia Coppola film Marie Antoinette, and "Waking Dream" appeared in an episode of Grey's Anatomy. This was followed by With You in 2008 and Spark in 2011. Her latest release, Strange Bird, came out in 2015.

=== Mouchette ===
In 2009, Walker formed the band Mouchette, which also includes Aaron Nevezie (guitar), David Manson (drums), John Stenger (keyboard), and John Davis (bass). They released their first EP in May 2009, entitled Orchids to Ashes. This was followed in 2010 by the EP Glimmer and the full-length album Late Bloomer, released in 2020.

=== Other projects ===
In 2007, Walker contributed vocals to the debut album by electronica project Dive Index, titled Mid/Air, as well as the remix album Collisions – The Mid/Air Remixes, issued in 2008.

== Discography ==
=== with Daughter Darling ===
- Sweet Shadows (2002)

=== Solo ===
Studio albums

- Urban Angel (2006)
- With You (2008)
- Spark (2011)
- Strange Bird (2015)

EPs

- Live at the Bunker (2009)
- Evenfall (2019)

Singles

- "No One Else" (2006)
- "Quicksand" (2006)
- "Crush" (2006)
- "Waking Dream" (King Britt Remix) (2008)
- "Over & Under" (2008)
- "Pink Neon" (2008)
- "With You" (Dive Index Remix) (2009)
- "Uptight" (2011)
- "Cool Kids" (2011)

=== with Mouchette ===
- Orchids to Ashes (EP, 2009)
- Glimmer (EP, 2010)
- "Sixer" (single, 2010)
- Late Bloomer (2020)

=== with Dive Index ===
- Mid/Air (2007)
- Collisions – The Mid/Air Remixes (2008)
