= Dampfzentrale =

Cultural centre in Bern, Switzerland

Coordinates: 46.9408°N 7.4441°E

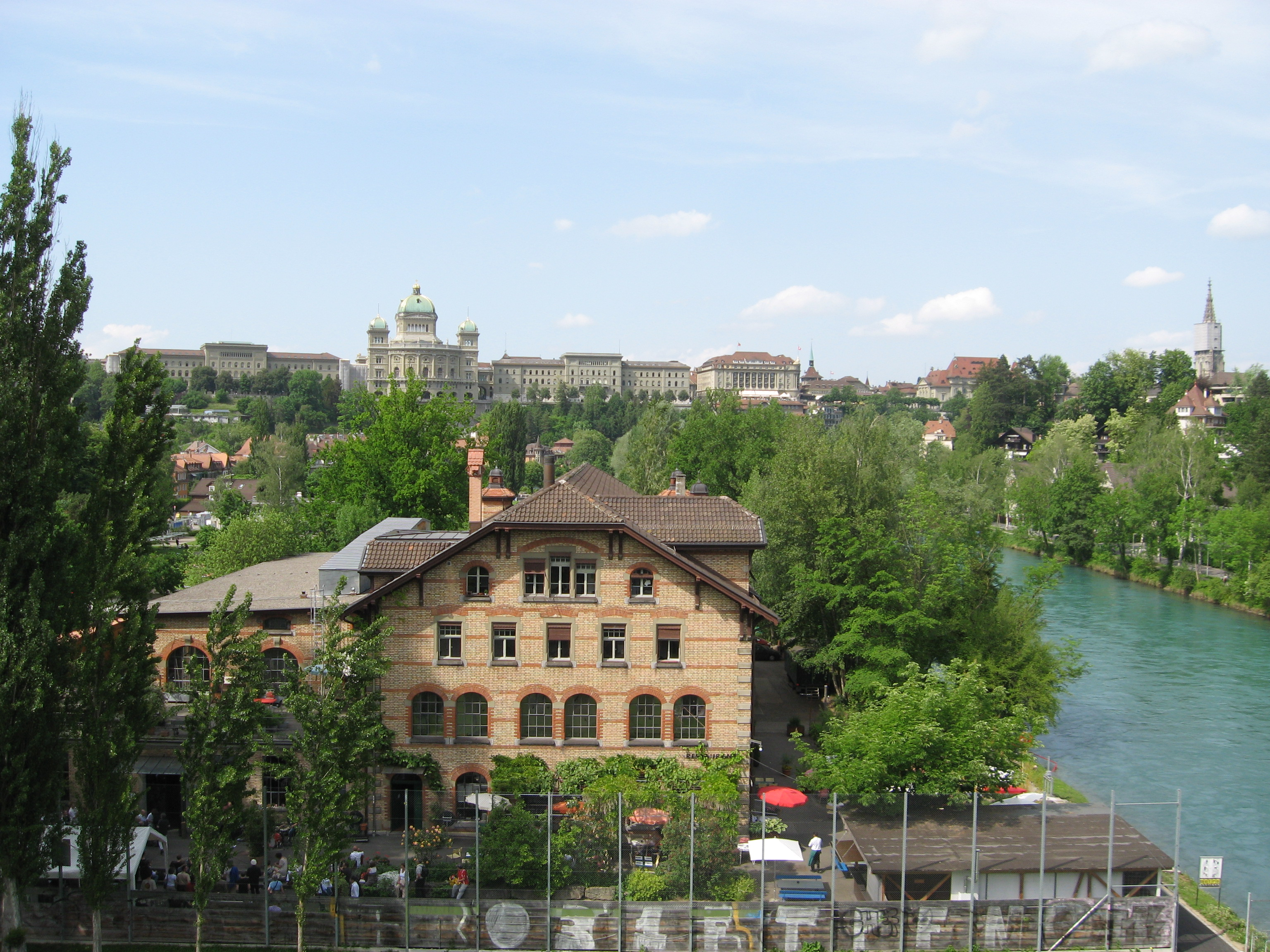
Dampfzentrale with the Federal Palace and Münster in the background.

The Dampfzentrale ("steam center") is a cultural centre and former fossil fuel power plant in Bern, Switzerland. The power plant was built between 1901 and 1904 by architect Eduard Joos at Marzilistrasse 47. The chair of the board Nicola von Greyerz stood down in 2018 and was replaced by Melanie Mettler and Vinzenz Mathys. In 2023, it was announced that the Dampfzentrale would receive 2.4 million CHF every year in subsidies from 2024 until 2027.

== See also ==
- Kulturzentrum Reitschule
