= Weissenburg railway station =

Railway station in Därstetten, Switzerland

Weissenburg
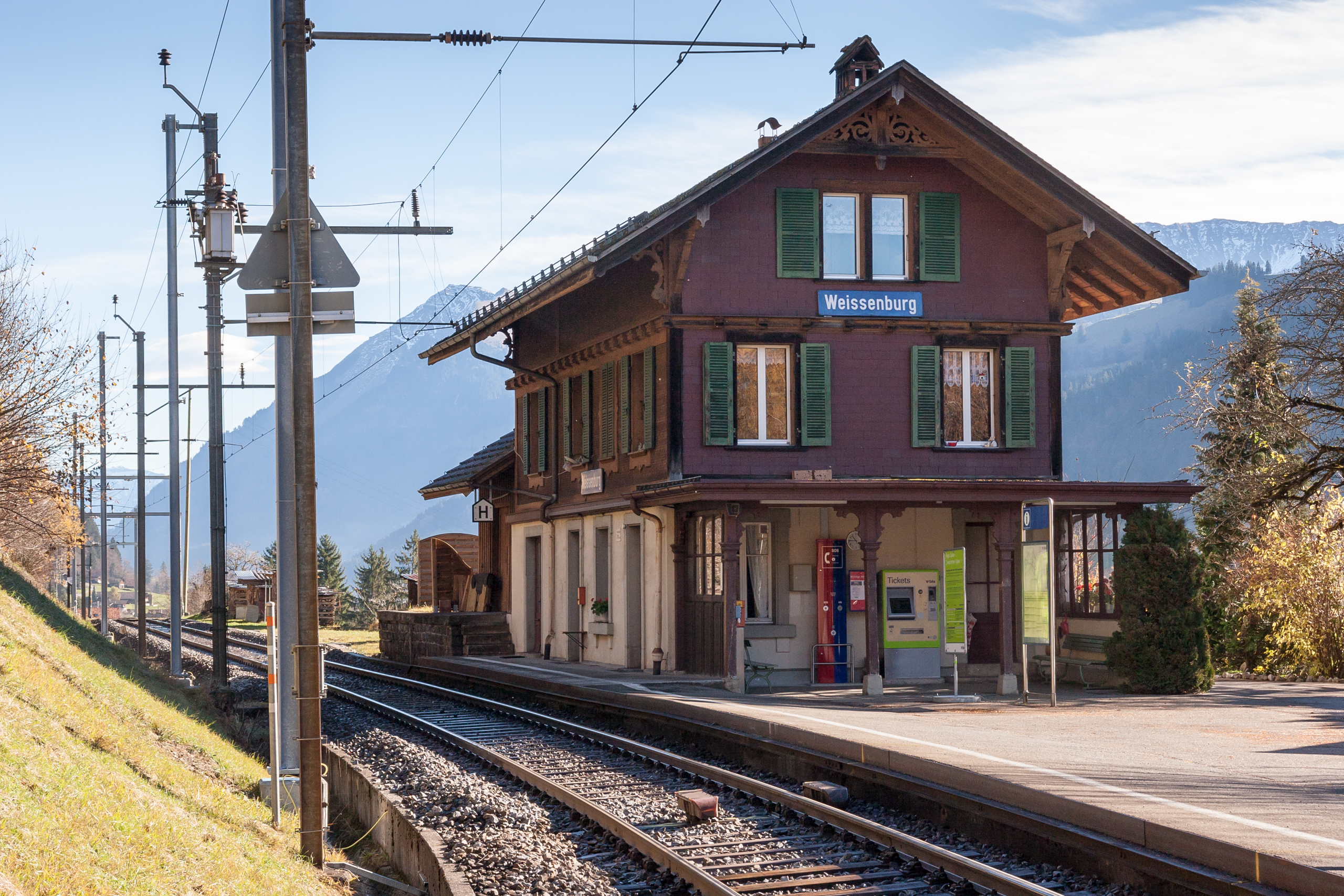
- The station building in 2010

General information
- Location: Därstetten; Switzerland
- Coordinates: 46°39′32″N 7°28′34″E
- Elevation: 782 m (2,566 ft)
- Owner: BLS AG
- Line: Spiez–Zweisimmen line
- Distance: 17.6 km (10.9 mi) from Spiez
- Platforms: 1 side platform
- Tracks: 1
- Train operators: BLS AG

Construction
- Accessible: Yes

Other information
- Station code: 8507294 (WG)
- Fare zone: 841 (Libero)

Passengers
- 2023: 50 per weekday (BLS)

Services
Preceding station	BLS	Following station
Oberwil im Simmental towards Zweisimmen	R11	Därstetten towards Bern
Location

Weissenburg railway station (German: Bahnhof Weissenburg) is a railway station in the municipality of Därstetten, in the Swiss canton of Bern. It is an intermediate stop on the Spiez–Zweisimmen line and is served as a request stop by local trains only.

== Services ==
The following services stop at Weissenburg:

- Regio: hourly service to Zweisimmen and Bern.
