= Därstetten railway station =

Railway station in Därstetten, Switzerland

Därstetten
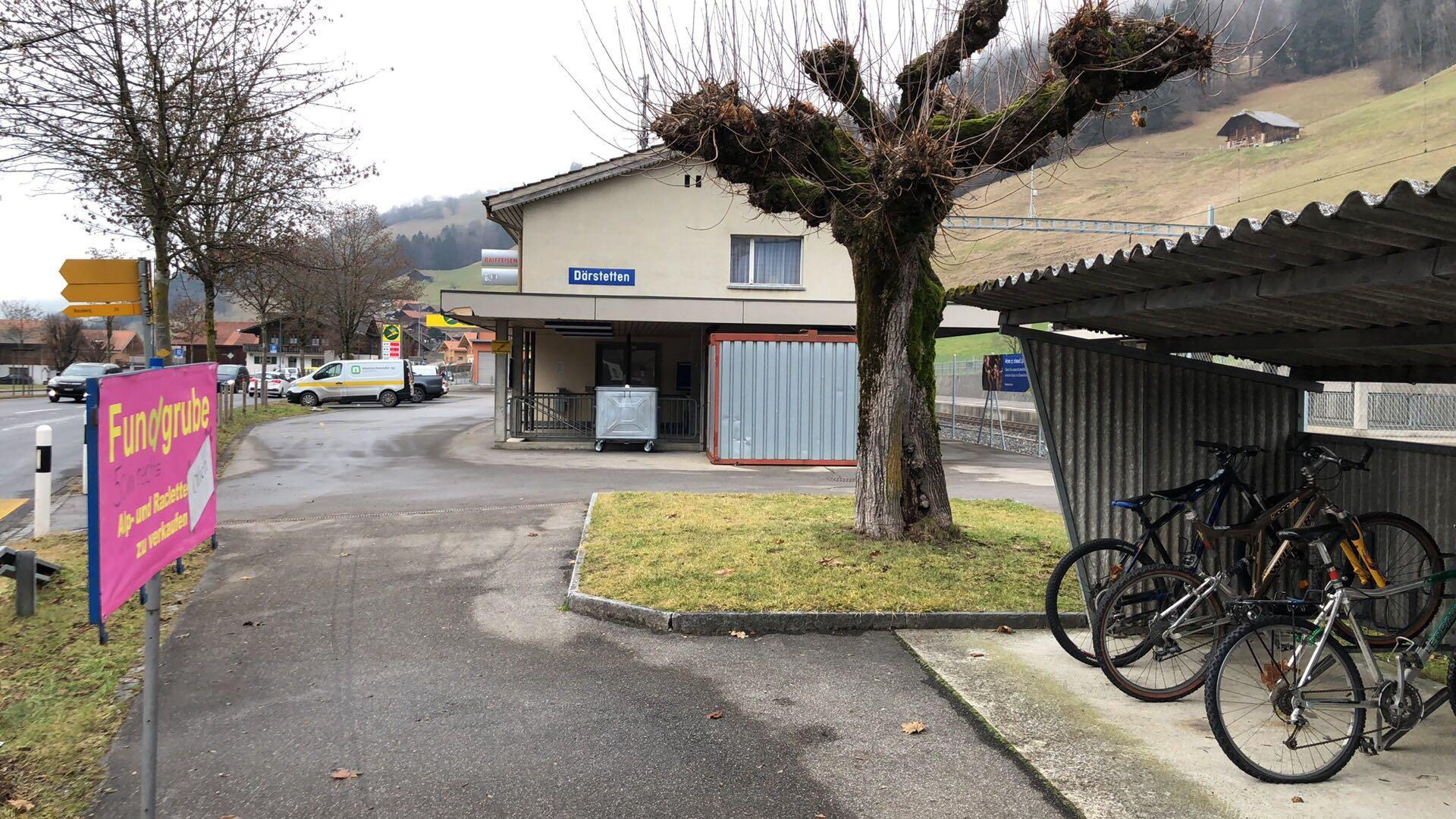
- The station building in 2019

General information
- Location: Därstetten; Switzerland
- Coordinates: 46°39′32″N 7°29′42″E
- Elevation: 758 m (2,487 ft)
- Owner: BLS AG
- Line: Spiez–Zweisimmen line
- Distance: 16.1 km (10.0 mi) from Spiez
- Platforms: 2 (1 island platform)
- Tracks: 2
- Train operators: BLS AG

Construction
- Accessible: No

Other information
- Station code: 8507295 (DR)
- Fare zone: 841 (Libero)

Passengers
- 2023: 170 per weekday (BLS)

Services
| Preceding station | BLS | Following station |
|---|---|---|
| Weissenburg towards Zweisimmen | R11 | Ringoldingen towards Bern |
Location

Därstetten railway station (German: Bahnhof Därstetten) is a railway station in the municipality of Därstetten, in the Swiss canton of Bern. It is an intermediate stop on the Spiez–Zweisimmen line and is served by local trains only.

== Services ==
The following services stop at Därstetten:

- Regio: hourly service to Zweisimmen and Bern.
