= Weissenburg Castle =

Ruined castle in the canton of Bern, Switzerland

- Därstetten
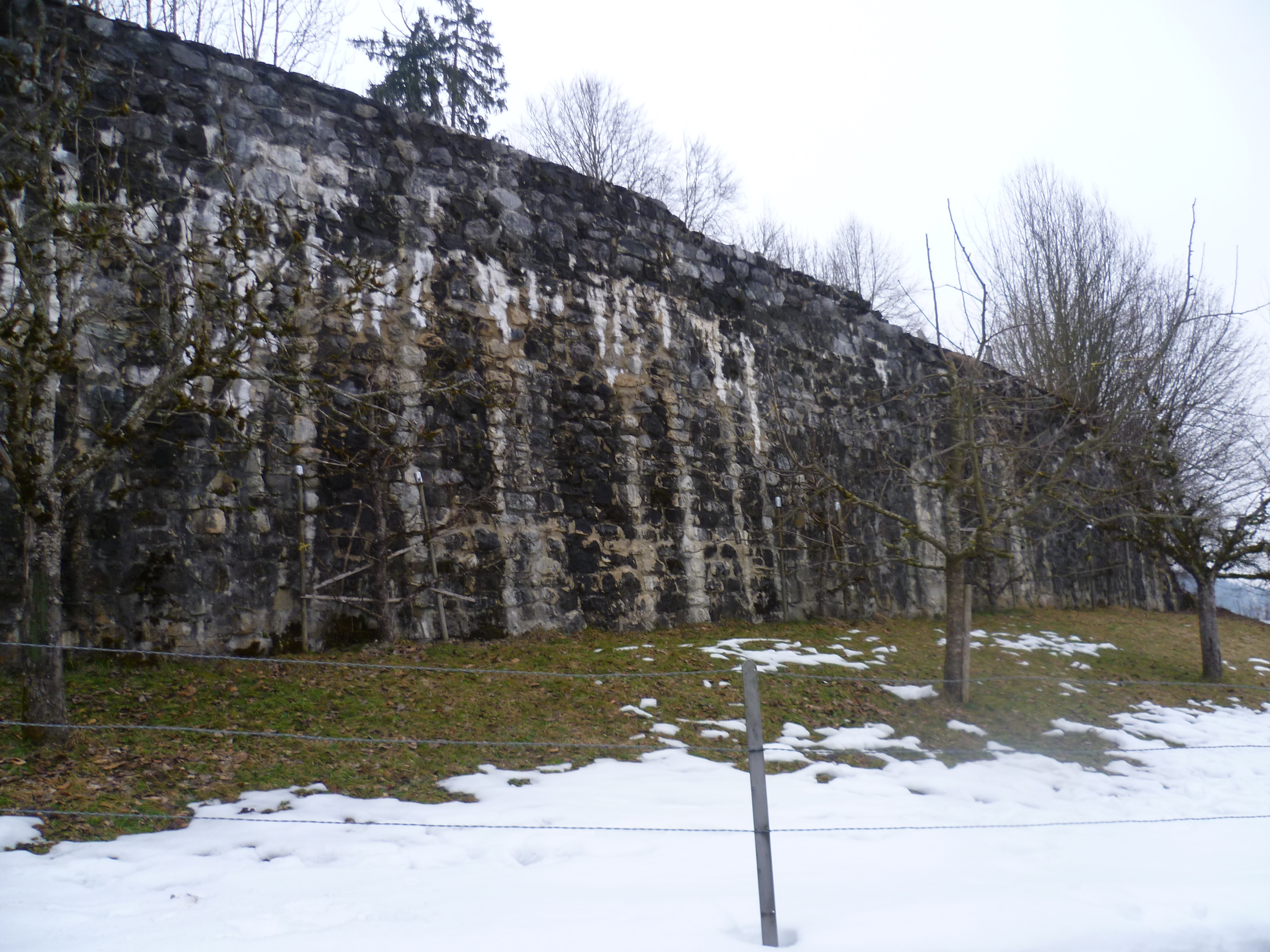
- The mostly intact 45 m (148 ft) long south wall

Site information
- Type: hill castle
- Code: CH
- Condition: Ruins

Location
- Location within Canton of Bern Location within Switzerland
- Coordinates: 46°39′30″N 7°28′24″E
- Height: 773 m above the sea

Site history
- Built: 13th century

Garrison information
- Occupants: Freiherr

Weissenburg Castle (German: Ruine Weissenburg) is a ruined castle in the municipality of Därstetten of the Canton of Bern in Switzerland.

== History ==
In 1175 the Freiherr von Weissenburg was first mentioned as a land holder and vassal of Duke Berthold IV of Zähringen. Whether they had a castle at this time is not recorded. When he assumed the title in 1259, Rudolf III of Weissenburg expanded and repaired Weissenburg Castle to its full size. Beginning in the 13th century, the Weissenburgs began to expand their Herrschaft. Around 1250 they added Wimmis to their territory, followed by Weissenau Castle in Unterseen and the villages of Rothenfluh and Balm a few years later. However, Rudolf III sought closer relations with the Habsburgs which made an enemy of the nearby town of Bern. In 1288 he lost a battle at Wimmis against Bern and the village was plundered. Ten years later he quarreled with the Habsburgs and the Counts of Neu-Kyburg and lost control over the Rothenfluh and Weissenau Castles. Then, in 1303, he fought Bern again, this time protecting Wimmis.

Rudolf's son, Johann the Elder, was able to continue expanding the family holdings, adding part of the Hasli valley, Oberhofen Castle and Unspunnen Castle. However, in 1334 he suffered a decisive defeat against Bern and was forced to acknowledge Bern as overlord over the castle and Herrschaft. When his son Johann the Younger died in 1368, the Weissenburg line died out and their estates were inherited by the Lords of Brandis. In the mid-15th century the Lords of Brandis sold all their land holdings in the Bernese Oberland including Weissenburg Castle to Bern. Under Bernese rule, Wimmis Castle became the administrative center of the Niedersimmental and Weissenburg was abandoned. Over the following centuries the castle walls were demolished to provide construction material for houses in the village.

== Castle site ==
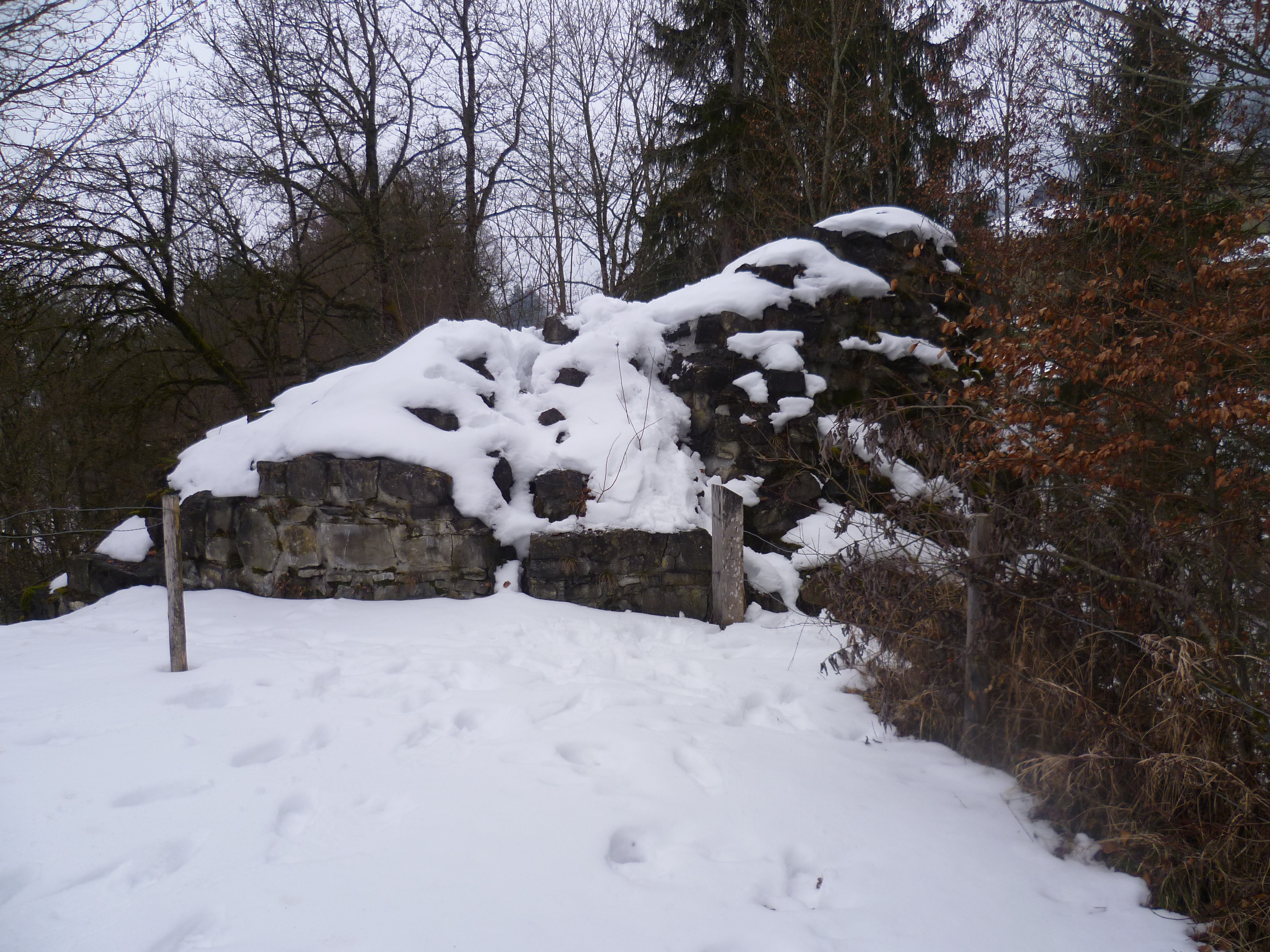
Remains of the round tower

The castle is located on a steep hill west of Weissenburg village near the confluence of the Bunsch stream and the Simme river. The castle is protected on three sides by the steep hill, while the gentler west side is guarded by a still visible ditch. Above the ditch portions of a round tower are still visible. The massive south wall and gate are still standing. East of the castle, the foundations of several small houses of the medieval town can be seen.

== See also ==
- List of castles in Switzerland
