= Oberwil im Simmental railway station =

Railway station in Oberwil im Simmental, Switzerland

Oberwil im Simmental
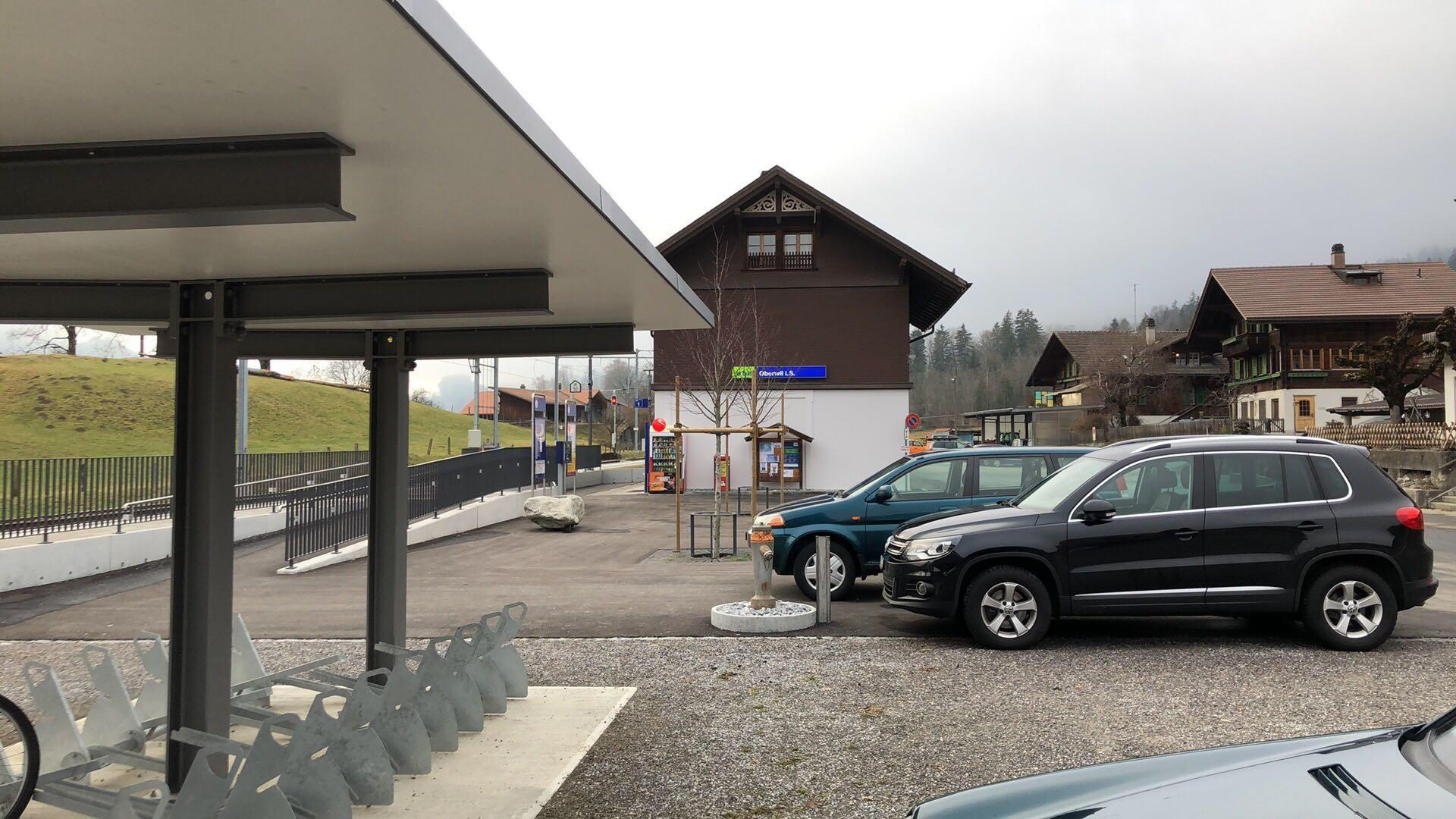
- The station building in 2019

General information
- Location: Oberwil im Simmental; Switzerland
- Coordinates: 46°39′22″N 7°26′06″E
- Elevation: 837 m (2,746 ft)
- Owner: BLS AG
- Line: Spiez–Zweisimmen line
- Distance: 20.9 km (13.0 mi) from Spiez
- Platforms: 1 side platform
- Tracks: 2
- Train operators: BLS AG

Construction
- Parking: Yes (15 spaces)
- Accessible: Yes

Other information
- Station code: 8507293 (OIS)
- Fare zone: 841/842 (Libero)

Passengers
- 2023: 150 per weekday (BLS)

Services
Preceding station	BLS	Following station
Enge im Simmental towards Zweisimmen	R11	Weissenburg towards Bern
Location

Oberwil im Simmental railway station (German: Bahnhof Oberwil im Simmental) is a railway station in the municipality of Oberwil im Simmental, in the Swiss canton of Bern. It is an intermediate stop on the Spiez–Zweisimmen line and is served by local trains only.

== Services ==
The following services stop at Oberwil im Simmental:

- Regio: hourly service to Zweisimmen and Bern.
