= No Compass Will Find Home =

Studio album by Merz
- Released: 7 January 2013
- Genre: Electronic
- Length: 40:49
- Label: Accidental
- Producer: Matthew Herbert

Merz chronology
Moi et Mon Camion (2008)	No Compass Will Find Home (2013)

Professional ratings
Aggregate scores
Source	Rating
Metacritic	68/100
Review scores
Source	Rating
MusicOMH	3/5 stars

No Compass Will Find Home is the fourth studio album from electronic musician Merz. It was released in January 2013 under Accidental Records, and produced by Matthew Herbert.

== Track list ==
All tracks are written by Conrad Lambert.

No.	Title	Length
1.	"Arrows"	4:40
2.	"Lauterbrunnen"	1:45
3.	"Judge"	4:07
4.	"Eudaimonia"	3:58
5.	"Toy"	3:15
6.	"Credo"	3:39
7.	"Goodbye My Chimera"	3:21
8.	"Our Airman Lost"	4:54
9.	"The Hunting Owl"	4:58
10.	"No Compass Will Find Home"	6:13
