= Därstetten =

- Municipality
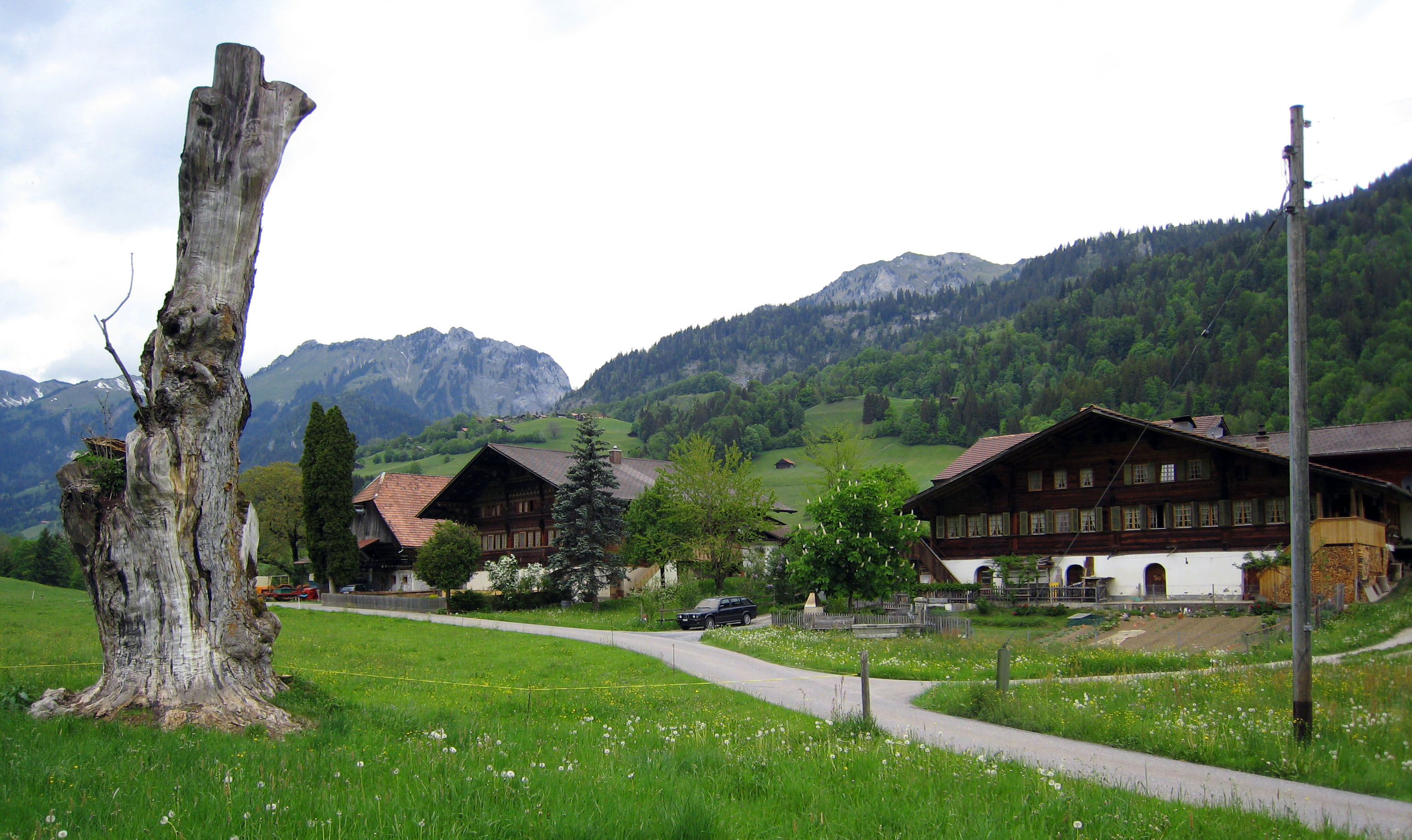
- The Moos hamlet in Därstetten.

- Flag Coat of arms
- Location of Därstetten
- Location within Switzerland Location within Canton of Bern
- Coordinates: 46°39′N 7°29′E
- Country: Switzerland
- Canton: Bern
- District: Frutigen-Niedersimmental

Government
  - Executive: Gemeinderat with 7 members
  - Mayor: Gemeindepräsident(in); Sonja Wiedmer Schneider (as of 2026)

Area
  - Total: 32.8 km^{2} (12.7 sq mi)
- Elevation: 757 m (2,484 ft)

Population (December 2020)
  - Total: 862
  - Density: 26.3/km^{2} (68.1/sq mi)
- Time zone: UTC+01:00 (CET)
  - Summer (DST): UTC+02:00 (CEST)
- Postal code: 3763
- SFOS number: 761
- ISO 3166 code: CH-BE
- Surrounded by: Blumenstein, Diemtigen, Erlenbach im Simmental, Oberstocken, Oberwil im Simmental, Pohlern, Rüeggisberg, Rüschegg
- Website: https://www.daerstetten.ch/

Därstetten is a municipality in the Frutigen-Niedersimmental administrative district in the canton of Bern in Switzerland.

== History ==
Därstetten is first mentioned in 1228 as Tarenchat. The village of Weissenburg was first mentioned around 1270 as Wisinburc and in 1278 as Album-castrum.

The oldest trace of a settlement in the area is a single Neolithic artifact found at Stufengrind. During the Middle Ages the land was owned by the Freiherr von Weissenburg, who was first mentioned in 1175. Around the third quarter of the 12th century he donated land along the Simmen river to the Augustinian order for a monastery. The monastery was first mentioned in 1228 along with the surrounding village. Weissenburg Castle was probably built in the mid-13th century and was first mentioned in 1278. In 1368 the Freiherr von Brandis inherited the Weissenburg lands including patronage of the monastery. It continued to expand during the 13th and 14th centuries as nobles donated lands and the monastery bought estates. The monastery church of St. Mary became the burial church of the Freiherrs. In 1439 the city of Bern acquired the Weissenburg lands including the monastery and the village. In 1486 they forced the monastery to accept the authority of the college of canons of the Cathedral of Bern. In 1528, Bern adopted the new faith of the Protestant Reformation and secularized the monastery. The monastery church became the parish church of newly created parish.

The farming communities around the monastery were generally self-sufficient with only limited trade. Beginning in the 16th century this changed as they began raising livestock for export. In 1902 the Spiez-Zweisimmen railroad connected Därstetten with the Swiss rail network and the Därstetten and Weissenburg rail stations became village centers. Today the local economy is based on cattle raising, cheese making, forestry, small businesses and tourism.

== Geography ==
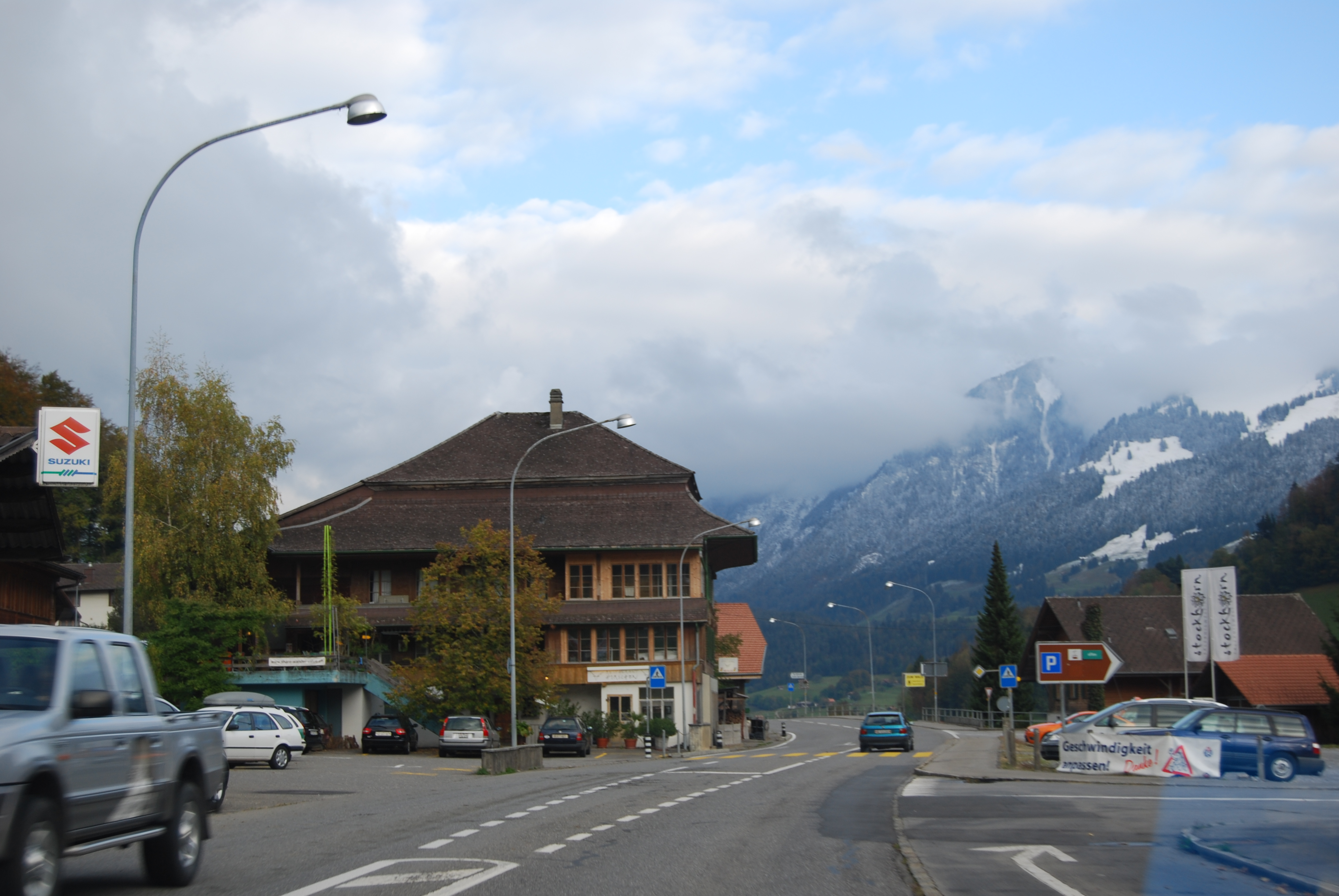
Därstetten municipality and surrounding mountains

Därstetten has an area of 32.84 km^{2} (12.68 sq mi). As of 2012, a total of 15.16 km^{2} (5.85 mi^{2}) or 46.2% is used for agricultural purposes, while 13.07 km^{2} (5.05 mi^{2}) or 39.9% is forested. The rest of the municipality is 0.88 km^{2} (0.34 mi^{2}) or 2.7% is settled (buildings or roads), 0.36 km^{2} (0.14 mi^{2}) or 1.1% is either rivers or lakes and 3.32 km^{2} (1.28 mi^{2}) or 10.1% is unproductive land.

During the same year, housing and buildings made up 1.3% and transportation infrastructure made up 1.2%. A total of 32.8% of the total land area is heavily forested and 5.7% is covered with orchards or small clusters of trees. Of the agricultural land, 15.9% is pasturage and 29.9% is used for alpine pastures. All the water in the municipality is flowing water. Of the unproductive areas, 6.9% is unproductive vegetation and 3.2% is too rocky for vegetation.

The municipality is located on the valley floor and hills around the Stockhorn and Turnen mountains. The landscape includes a valley floor, forests and alps. It includes the farming cooperatives (Bäuerten) of Weissenburg, Reichenbach and Wiler.

On 31 December 2009 Amtsbezirk Niedersimmental, the municipality's former district, was dissolved. On the following day, 1 January 2010, it joined the newly created Verwaltungskreis Frutigen-Niedersimmental.

== Coat of arms ==
The blazon of the municipal coat of arms is Gules a castle embatteled [sic] Argent and a double rose of the same barbed and seeded proper.

== Demographics ==
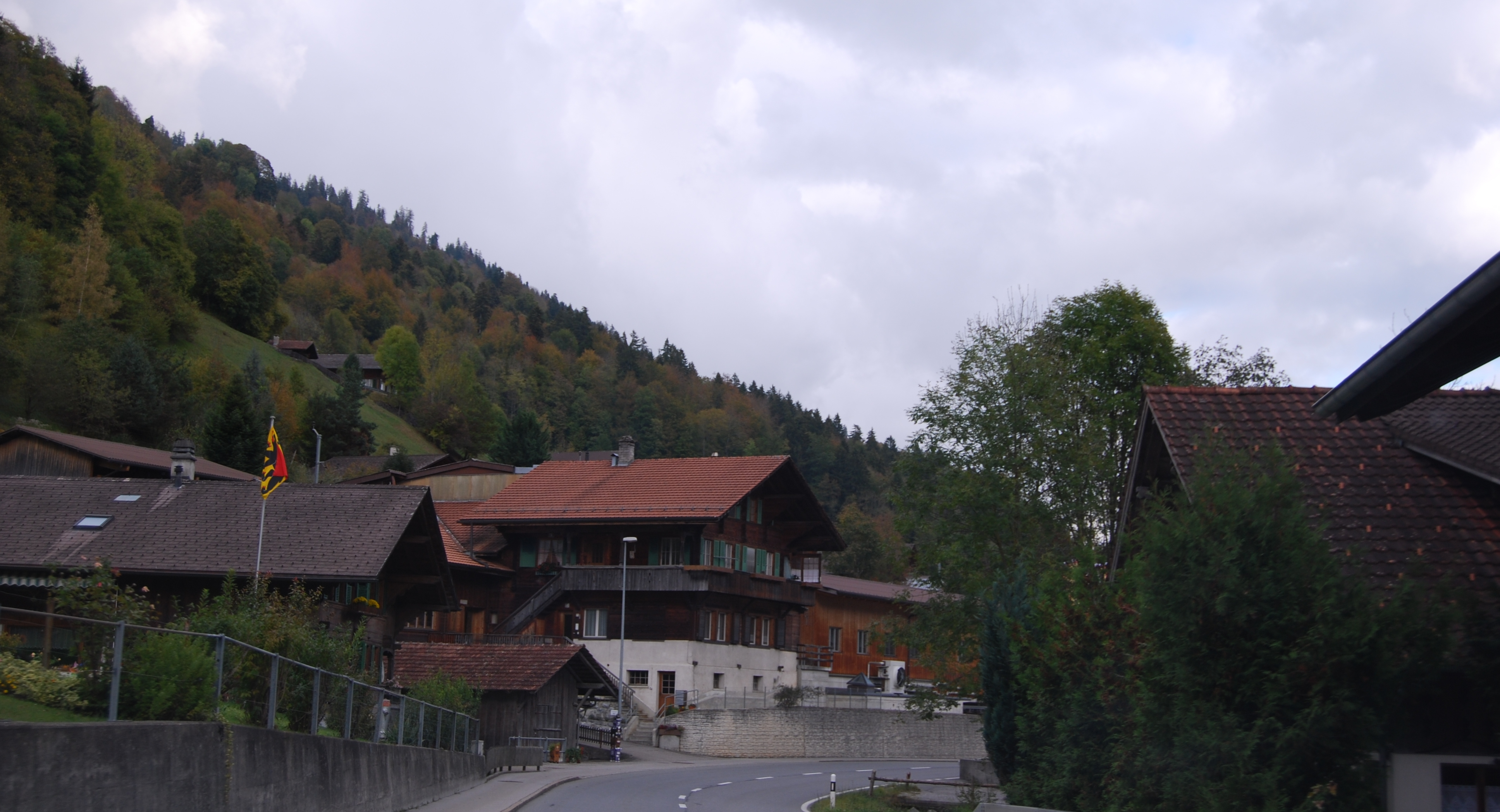
Houses in Därstetten

Därstetten has a population (as of December 2020) of 862. As of 2010, 2.8% of the population are resident foreign nationals. Over the last 10 years (2001-2011) the population has changed at a rate of -3.2%. Migration accounted for -2.9%, while births and deaths accounted for -0.4%.

Most of the population (as of 2000) speaks German (852 or 96.9%) as their first language, French is the second most common (8 or 0.9%) and Albanian is the third (6 or 0.7%). There are 2 people who speak Italian and 2 people who speak Romansh.

As of 2008, the population was 50.6% male and 49.4% female. The population was made up of 414 Swiss men (48.8% of the population) and 16 (1.9%) non-Swiss men. There were 411 Swiss women (48.4%) and 8 (0.9%) non-Swiss women. Of the population in the municipality, 467 or about 53.1% were born in Därstetten and lived there in 2000. There were 267 or 30.4% who were born in the same canton, while 70 or 8.0% were born somewhere else in Switzerland, and 45 or 5.1% were born outside of Switzerland.

As of 2011, children and teenagers (0–19 years old) make up 20.8% of the population, while adults (20–64 years old) make up 60.3% and seniors (over 64 years old) make up 18.9%.

As of 2000, there were 396 people who were single and never married in the municipality. There were 398 married individuals, 63 widows or widowers and 22 individuals who are divorced.

As of 2010, there were 105 households that consist of only one person and 28 households with five or more people. In 2000, a total of 296 apartments (70.5% of the total) were permanently occupied, while 98 apartments (23.3%) were seasonally occupied and 26 apartments (6.2%) were empty. As of 2010, the construction rate of new housing units was 2.4 new units per 1000 residents. The vacancy rate for the municipality, in 2012, was 0.87%. In 2011, single family homes made up 45.9% of the total housing in the municipality.

The historical population is given in the following chart:

== Heritage sites of national significance ==
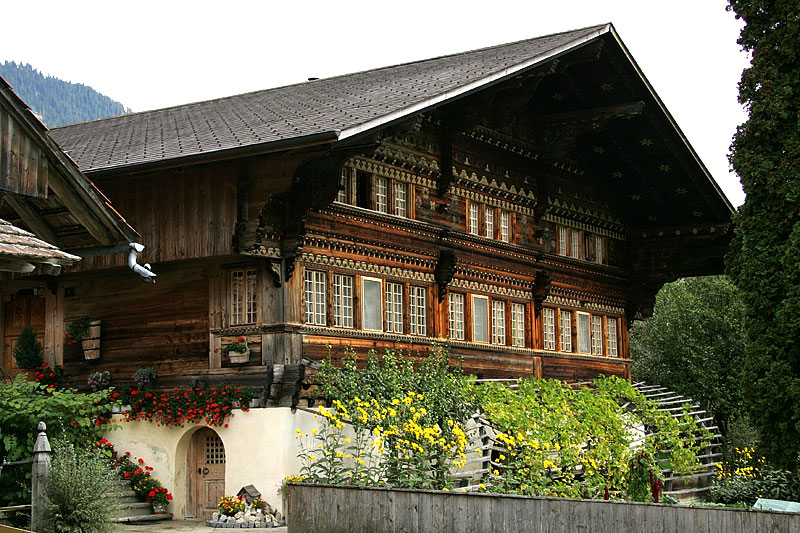
Knuttihaus im Moos

The farm house at Nidflue 309, the farm house Argel at Zur Obern 161 and the Knuttihaus im Moos at Moos 47 are all listed as Swiss heritage sites of national significance. The hamlets of Nidflue and Wiler, the Därstetten Church and the area around the Weissenburg are all part of the Inventory of Swiss Heritage Sites.

== Politics ==
In the 2011 federal election the most popular party was the Swiss People's Party (SVP) which received 62.2% of the vote. The next three most popular parties were the Conservative Democratic Party (BDP) (15.1%), the Federal Democratic Union of Switzerland (EDU) (6.5%) and the Social Democratic Party (SP) (3.3%). In the federal election, a total of 341 votes were cast, and the voter turnout was 51.9%.

== Economy ==
As of 2011, Därstetten had an unemployment rate of 0.73%. As of 2008, there were a total of 358 people employed in the municipality. Of these, there were 155 people employed in the primary economic sector and about 54 businesses involved in this sector. 78 people were employed in the secondary sector and there were 16 businesses in this sector. 125 people were employed in the tertiary sector, with 25 businesses in this sector. There were 437 residents of the municipality who were employed in some capacity, of which females made up 40.5% of the workforce.

In 2008 there were a total of 248 full-time equivalent jobs. The number of jobs in the primary sector was 89, all of which were in agriculture. The number of jobs in the secondary sector was 70 of which 39 or (55.7%) were in manufacturing and 31 (44.3%) were in construction. The number of jobs in the tertiary sector was 89. In the tertiary sector; 35 or 39.3% were in wholesale or retail sales or the repair of motor vehicles, 10 or 11.2% were in the movement and storage of goods, 14 or 15.7% were in a hotel or restaurant, 6 or 6.7% were technical professionals or scientists, 7 or 7.9% were in education and 13 or 14.6% were in health care.

In 2000, there were 74 workers who commuted into the municipality and 225 workers who commuted away. The municipality is a net exporter of workers, with about 3.0 workers leaving the municipality for every one entering. A total of 212 workers (74.1% of the 286 total workers in the municipality) both lived and worked in Därstetten. Of the working population, 11.7% used public transportation to get to work, and 56.3% used a private car.

In 2011 the average local and cantonal tax rate on a married resident, with two children, of Därstetten making 150,000 CHF was 12.6%, while an unmarried resident's rate was 18.5%. For comparison, the average rate for the entire canton in the same year, was 14.2% and 22.0%, while the nationwide average was 12.3% and 21.1% respectively. In 2009 there were a total of 344 tax payers in the municipality. Of that total, 62 made over 75,000 CHF per year. There were 8 people who made between 15,000 and 20,000 per year. The greatest number of workers, 94, made between 50,000 and 75,000 CHF per year. The average income of the over 75,000 CHF group in Därstetten was 99,552 CHF, while the average across all of Switzerland was 130,478 CHF.

In 2011 a total of 1.8% of the population received direct financial assistance from the government.

== Religion ==
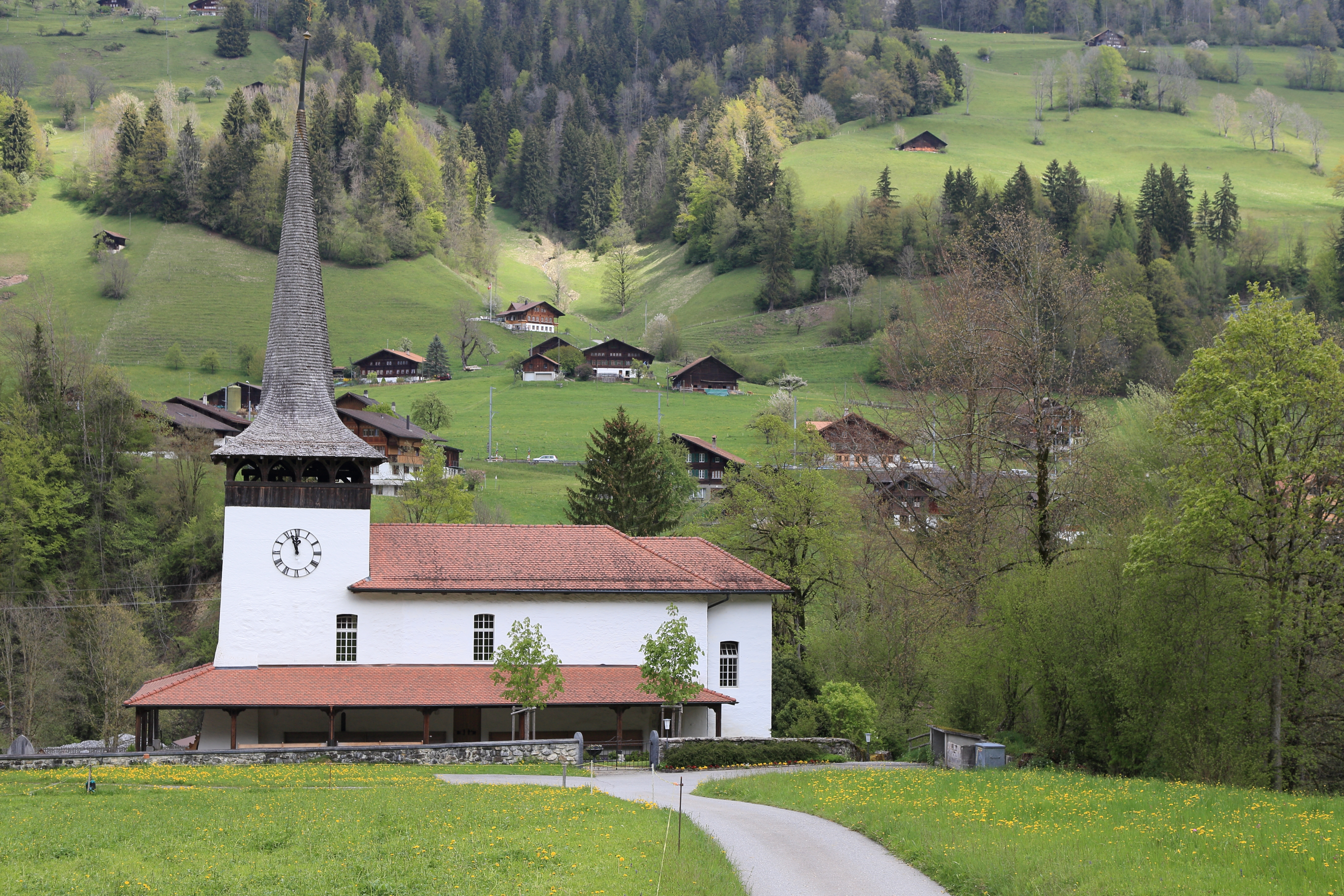
Reformed church Därstetten

From the 2000 census, 747 or 85.0% belonged to the Swiss Reformed Church, while 47 or 5.3% were Roman Catholic. Of the rest of the population, there was 1 member of an Orthodox church, and there were 30 individuals (or about 3.41% of the population) who belonged to another Christian church. There were 12 (or about 1.37% of the population) who were Islamic. There was 1 person who was Hindu and 4 individuals who belonged to another church. 16 (or about 1.82% of the population) belonged to no church, are agnostic or atheist, and 21 individuals (or about 2.39% of the population) did not answer the question.

== Transport ==
Därstetten sits on the Spiez–Zweisimmen line and is served by trains at the Därstetten and Weissenburg railway stations.

== Education ==
In Därstetten about 53.4% of the population have completed non-mandatory upper secondary education, and 8.9% have completed additional higher education (either university or a Fachhochschule). Of the 42 who had completed some form of tertiary schooling listed in the census, 73.8% were Swiss men, 23.8% were Swiss women.

The Canton of Bern school system provides one year of non-obligatory Kindergarten, followed by six years of Primary school. This is followed by three years of obligatory lower Secondary school where the students are separated according to ability and aptitude. Following the lower Secondary students may attend additional schooling or they may enter an apprenticeship.

During the 2011-12 school year, there were a total of 93 students attending classes in Därstetten. There was one kindergarten class with a total of 14 students in the municipality. The municipality had 3 primary classes and 49 students. Of the primary students, 6.1% were permanent or temporary residents of Switzerland (not citizens). During the same year, there was one lower secondary class with a total of 19 students. There were 5.3% who were permanent or temporary residents of Switzerland (not citizens). The remainder of the students attend a private or special school.

As of 2000, there were a total of 94 students attending any school in the municipality. Of those, 92 both lived and attended school in the municipality, while 2 students came from another municipality. During the same year, 88 residents attended schools outside the municipality.
