= Kulturzentrum Reitschule =

Self-managed social centre in Bern, Switzerland

Coordinates: 46.9530°N 7.4406°E

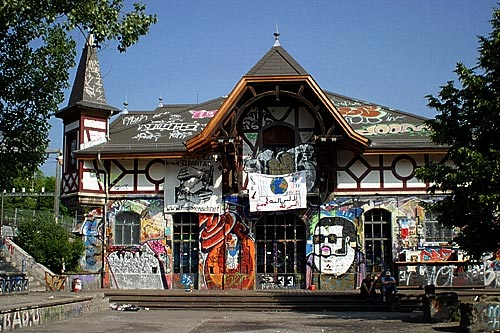
The building in 2003

Kulturzentrum Reitschule (transl. "Cultural Center Riding School") is a self-managed social centre at Neubrückstrasse 8 in Bern, Switzerland. It was first squatted in the 1980s and legalized after several evictions.

== History ==
The Reitschule was built from the municipality of Bern in 1895 to 1897. Albert Gerster was the architect of the romantic exposed brick ensemble characterized by steep hipped roofs. The buildings next to the large Reithalle were for stables and for pitches for carriages. Additionally there were some apartments. After horses were replaced by cars, the premises were used as storage. Only after the Opernhauskrawalle in the 1980s, was the Reitschule was considered as a self-managed social centre. In 1981, it was squatted by rebellious youths and used for events. It was forcibly evicted by the authorities a year later.

=== Squatting ===
In order to protest the lack of cultural and event venues, various Straf-Bars (German wordplay with the word punishable and bar) took place in Bern from the mid-1980s onwards. In the context of these Strafbars, vacant buildings or grounds were squatted and used as concert and event venues for one night (for example, in the summer of 1987 the former combined heat and power plant called Dampfzentrale). In 1987, the initiative sport instead of AJZ (German: autonomous youth centres) with the goal to cancel the Reitschule was submitted. As a reaction and in the context of the Strafbar movement, the Reitschule was squatted on November 24, 1987. In the scope of the cultural strike the Reitschule was squatted on October 31 for a second cultural night and then taken possession of by squatters.

On November 17, 1987, the land squat Zaffaraya was evicted. Zaffaraya was a tent and wagon village based in Bern. That was followed by peaceful and militant protests. A 10% drop in Christmas sales led to the civic local council agreeing to continue in the usage of the Reitschule. It was followed in the early 1990s by a use-lease agreement. Despite multiple threats of eviction and unsuccessful political attempts to abolish the autonomous cultural centre, it has been able to maintain on until today.

Between 1999 and 2004, the premises were renovated for a total of 13 million CHF. The whole thing was financed by the city of Bern and rebuilt in close cooperation with the operators of the Reitschule. Since then, the Reitschule has a service agreement and a rental contract with the city of Bern. It hosts a restaurant and organizes concerts, exhibitions and club nights.

== Disputes ==
The people of Bern have voted five times about the future of the centre and suggestions to abolish it have always been rejected. In 2010, an initiative of the Swiss People's Party to sell the premises was launched. It was rejected with 68.4 percent majority.

The Young SVP gained 17,500 signatures and they launched a new initiative in April 2016 called: no tax money for the Reithalle Bern (German: Keine Steuergelder für die Berner Reithalle). Two years later Federal Supreme Court of Switzerland confirmed the invalidation of the initiative. It was pronounced by the Grand Council in the first instance on 21 March on basis of a motion by the Council of State of Bern and the Finance Commission.

== See also ==
- Dampfzentrale
- Jugendkulturhaus Dynamo
