= Rüschegg =

- Municipality
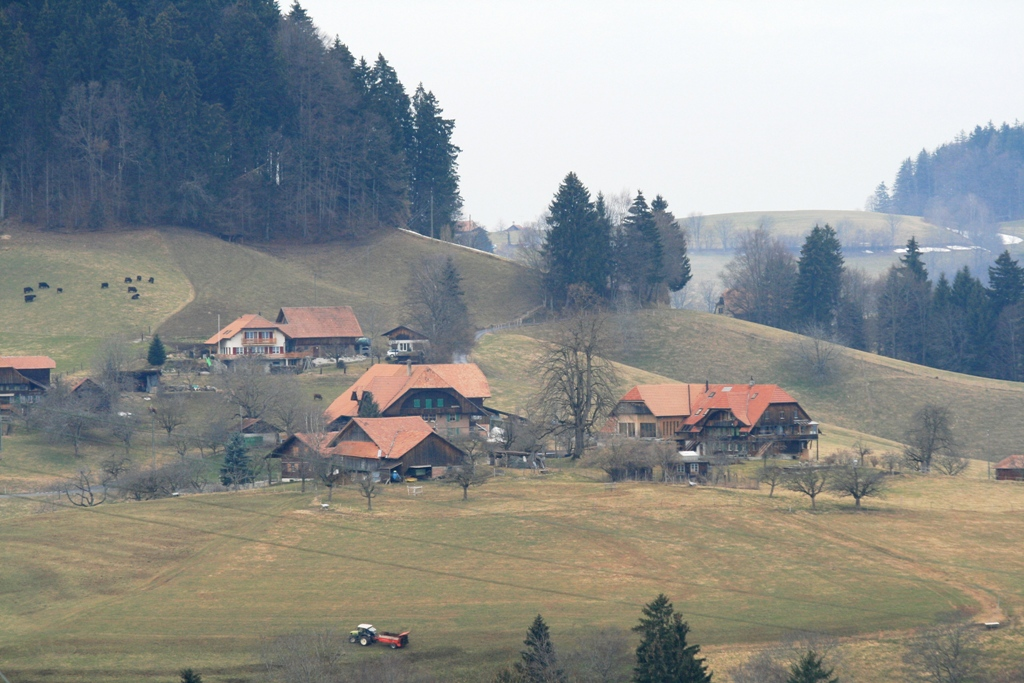

- Flag Coat of arms
- Location of Rüschegg
- Location within Switzerland Location within Canton of Bern
- Coordinates: 46°46′N 7°23′E
- Country: Switzerland
- Canton: Bern
- District: Bern-Mittelland

Government
  - Executive: Gemeinderat with 7 members
  - Mayor: Gemeindepräsident(in); Markus Hirschi FDP/PLR (as of 2026)

Area
  - Total: 57.4 km^{2} (22.2 sq mi)
- Elevation: 890 m (2,920 ft)

Population (December 2020)
  - Total: 1,697
  - Density: 29.6/km^{2} (76.6/sq mi)
- Time zone: UTC+01:00 (CET)
  - Summer (DST): UTC+02:00 (CEST)
- Postal code: 3153, 3154
- SFOS number: 853
- ISO 3166 code: CH-BE
- Surrounded by: Därstetten, Guggisberg, Oberwil im Simmental, Rüeggisberg, Rüti bei Riggisberg, Wahlern
- Website: www.rueschegg.ch

Rüschegg is a municipality in the Bern-Mittelland administrative district in the canton of Bern in Switzerland. It is also a Swiss Reformed Church parish.

== History ==
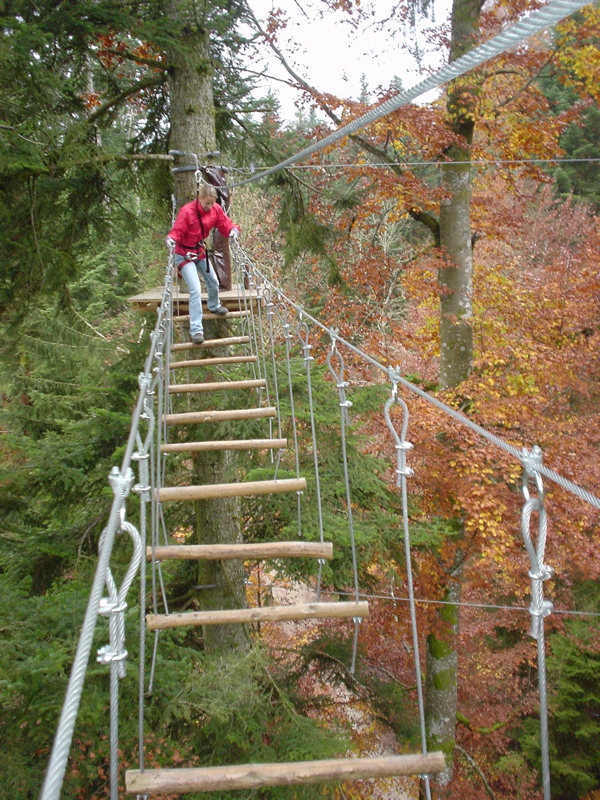
Gantrisch Ropes Course

Rüschegg is first mentioned around 1417-28 as Ruesseg. Until 1860 Rüschegg was part of Guggisberg. The village church was built in 1813. In 1860, when it became an independent municipality, it also became its own parish. Until the early-20th century it was known as the poorest municipality in the Canton of Bern. With Federal and Cantonal support and rising tourism the local economy improved. Today there are several hotels, hiking trails and ski slopes in the municipality as well as a ropes course in the hamlet of Längeneybad. However, in 2000 about two-thirds of the working population commuted to jobs in Bern and surrounding cities.

== Geography ==
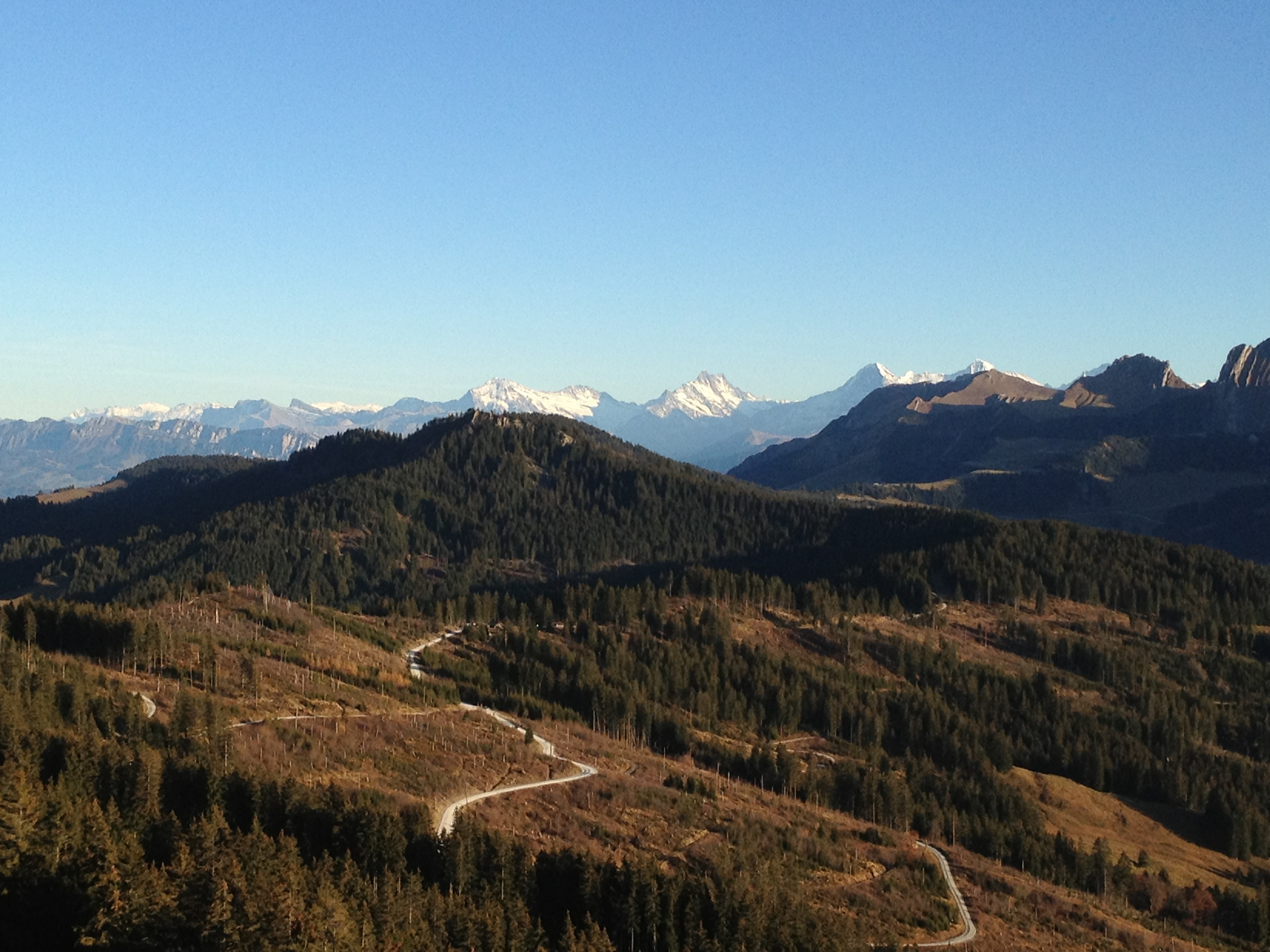
View from Mount Pfyffe in the municipality

Rüschegg has an area of 57.3 km^{2} (22.12 sq mi). As of 2012, a total of 23.83 km^{2} (9.20 mi^{2}) or 41.6% is used for agricultural purposes, while 28.51 km^{2} (11.01 mi^{2}) or 49.8% is forested. The rest of the municipality is 1.73 km^{2} (0.67 mi^{2}) or 3.0% is settled (buildings or roads), 0.84 km^{2} (0.32 mi^{2}) or 1.5% is either rivers or lakes and 2.5 km^{2} (0.97 mi^{2}) or 4.4% is unproductive land.

During the same year, housing and buildings made up 1.4% and transportation infrastructure made up 1.3%. A total of 45.7% of the total land area is heavily forested and 3.8% is covered with orchards or small clusters of trees. Of the agricultural land, 2.2% is used for growing crops and 11.5% is pasturage and 27.6% is used for alpine pastures. All the water in the municipality is flowing water. Of the unproductive areas, 3.2% is unproductive vegetation and 1.1% is too rocky for vegetation.

The municipality is located in the Swiss Plateau Alpenvorland between the Schwarzwassergraben (elevation 714 m [2,343 ft]) and Ochsen peak (elevation 2,188 m [7,178 ft]) which is part of the Stockhorn chain. The Ochsen, Bürglen (2,165 m (7,103 ft)) and Gantrisch (2,175 m (7,136 ft)), form the southern border of the municipality. It includes the villages Heubach, Hirschhorn, Gambach and Graben.

The neighboring municipalities are Rüeggisberg, Rüti bei Riggisberg, Därstetten, Oberwil im Simmental, Guggisberg and Wahlern.

On 31 December 2009 Amtsbezirk Schwarzenburg, the municipality's former district, was dissolved. On the following day, 1 January 2010, it joined the newly created Verwaltungskreis Bern-Mittelland.

== Coat of arms ==
The blazon of the municipal coat of arms is Or a Lion Paw Sable issuant from chief sinister holding a Fir Tree Vert trunked and eradicated Gules.

== Demographics ==
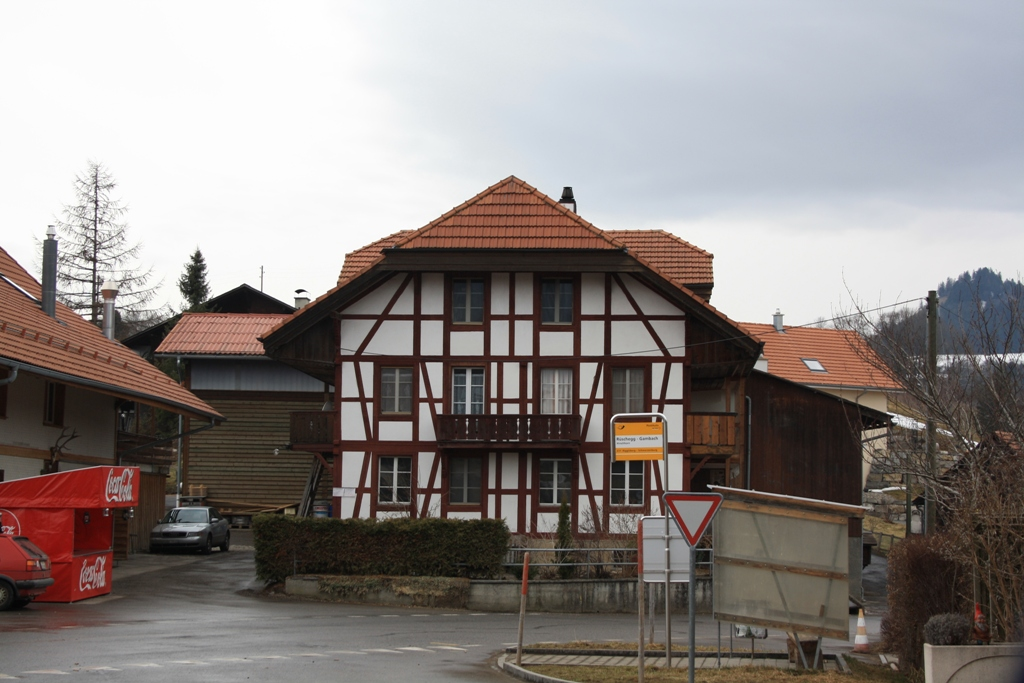
Rüschegg village

Rüschegg has a population (as of December 2020) of 1,697. As of 2011, 3.3% of the population are resident foreign nationals. Over the last year (2010-2011) the population has changed at a rate of -0.1%. Migration accounted for -3.6%, while births and deaths accounted for 0.2%.

Most of the population (as of 2000) speaks German (1,585 or 97.4%) as their first language, English is the second most common (9 or 0.6%) and Albanian is the third (9 or 0.6%). There are 8 people who speak French, 2 people who speak Italian and 1 person who speaks Romansh.

As of 2008, the population was 49.3% male and 50.7% female. The population was made up of 790 Swiss men (47.7% of the population) and 27 (1.6%) non-Swiss men. There were 818 Swiss women (49.4%) and 21 (1.3%) non-Swiss women.

Of the population in the municipality, 715 or about 43.9% were born in Rüschegg and lived there in 2000. There were 602 or 37.0% who were born in the same canton, while 178 or 10.9% were born somewhere else in Switzerland, and 93 or 5.7% were born outside of Switzerland. As of 2011, children and teenagers (0–19 years old) make up 19.2% of the population, while adults (20–64 years old) make up 61.3% and seniors (over 64 years old) make up 19.5%.

As of 2000, there were 670 people who were single and never married in the municipality. There were 777 married individuals, 117 widows or widowers and 64 individuals who are divorced.

As of 2010, there were 222 households that consist of only one person and 46 households with five or more people. In 2000, a total of 610 apartments (67.9% of the total) were permanently occupied, while 225 apartments (25.0%) were seasonally occupied and 64 apartments (7.1%) were empty. As of 2010, the construction rate of new housing units was 2.4 new units per 1000 residents. The vacancy rate for the municipality, in 2010, was 3.35%. In 2011, single family homes made up 51.5% of the total housing in the municipality.

The historical population is given in the following chart:

== Politics ==
In the 2011 federal election the most popular party was the Swiss People's Party (SVP) which received 43.6% of the vote. The next three most popular parties were the Social Democratic Party (SP) (13.8%), the Conservative Democratic Party (BDP) (13.3%) and the Green Party (8%). In the federal election, a total of 625 votes were cast, and the voter turnout was 43.5%.

== Economy ==
As of 2011, Rüschegg had an unemployment rate of 1.3%. As of 2008, there were a total of 409 people employed in the municipality. Of these, there were 164 people employed in the primary economic sector and about 68 businesses involved in this sector. 52 people were employed in the secondary sector and there were 17 businesses in this sector. 193 people were employed in the tertiary sector, with 38 businesses in this sector. There were 825 residents of the municipality who were employed in some capacity, of which females made up 40.4% of the workforce.

In 2008 there were a total of 280 full-time equivalent jobs. The number of jobs in the primary sector was 93, of which 86 were in agriculture and 7 were in forestry or lumber production. The number of jobs in the secondary sector was 45 of which 14 or (31.1%) were in manufacturing and 30 (66.7%) were in construction. The number of jobs in the tertiary sector was 142. In the tertiary sector; 37 or 26.1% were in wholesale or retail sales or the repair of motor vehicles, 11 or 7.7% were in the movement and storage of goods, 52 or 36.6% were in a hotel or restaurant, 3 or 2.1% were technical professionals or scientists, 15 or 10.6% were in education and 6 or 4.2% were in health care.

In 2000, there were 98 workers who commuted into the municipality and 545 workers who commuted away. The municipality is a net exporter of workers, with about 5.6 workers leaving the municipality for every one entering. A total of 280 workers (74.1% of the 378 total workers in the municipality) both lived and worked in Rüschegg. Of the working population, 13.7% used public transportation to get to work, and 63.6% used a private car.

In 2011 the average local and cantonal tax rate on a married resident, with two children, of Rüschegg making 150,000 CHF was 12.5%, while an unmarried resident's rate was 18.4%. For comparison, the average rate for the entire canton in the same year, was 14.2% and 22.0%, while the nationwide average was 12.3% and 21.1% respectively.

In 2009 there were a total of 707 tax payers in the municipality. Of that total, 150 made over 75,000 CHF per year. There were 11 people who made between 15,000 and 20,000 per year. The greatest number of workers, 208, made between 50,000 and 75,000 CHF per year. The average income of the over 75,000 CHF group in Rüschegg was 106,458 CHF, while the average across all of Switzerland was 130,478 CHF.

In 2011 a total of 3.3% of the population received direct financial assistance from the government.

== Religion ==
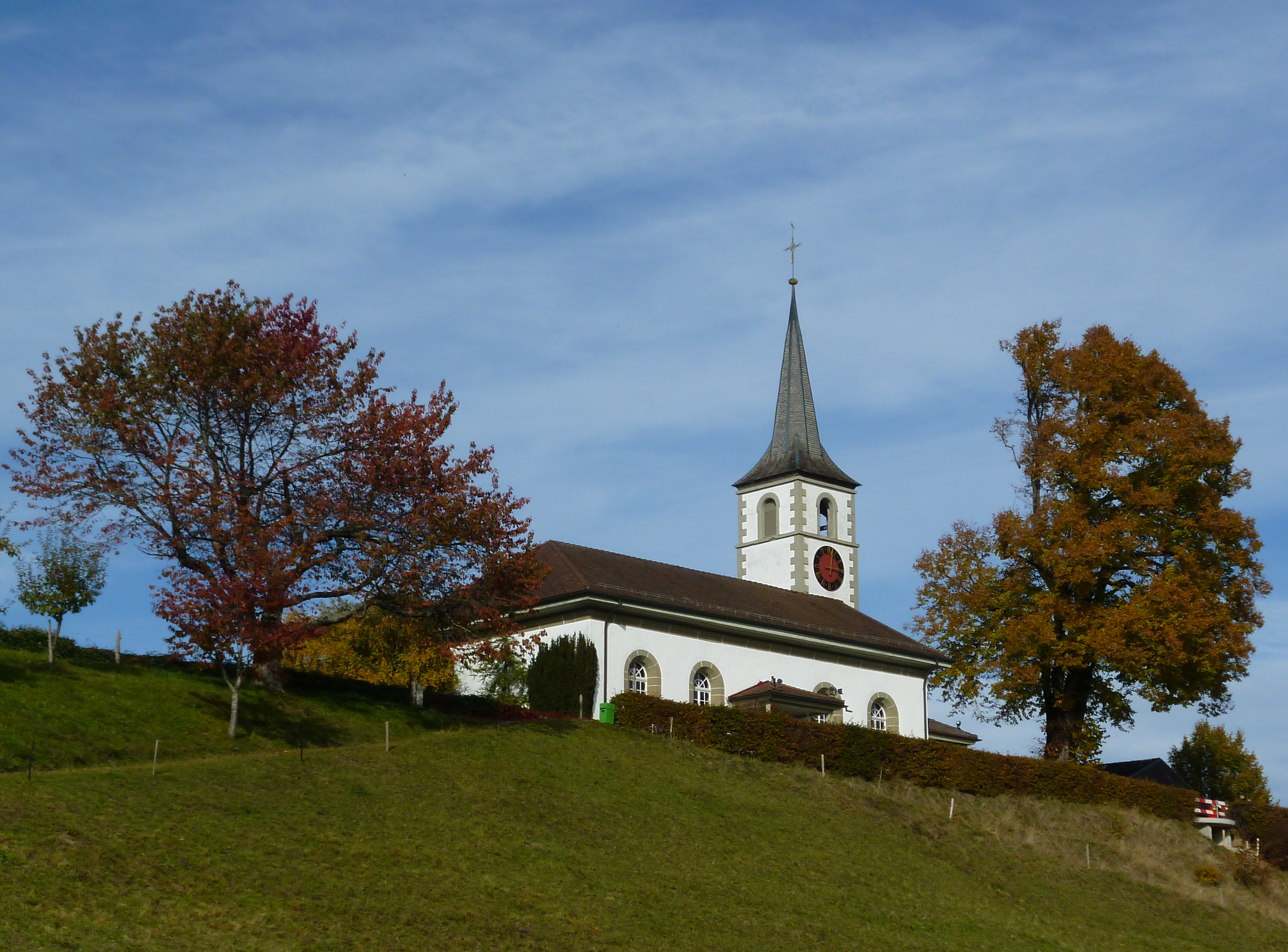
Village church in Rüschegg

From the 2000 census, 1,277 or 78.4% belonged to the Swiss Reformed Church, while 101 or 6.2% were Roman Catholic. Of the rest of the population, there was 1 individual who belongs to the Christian Catholic Church, and there were 91 individuals (or about 5.59% of the population) who belonged to another Christian church. There was 1 individual who was Jewish, and 20 (or about 1.23% of the population) who were Muslim. There was 1 person who was Hindu and 1 individual who belonged to another church. 105 (or about 6.45% of the population) belonged to no church, are agnostic or atheist, and 30 individuals (or about 1.84% of the population) did not answer the question.

== Education ==
In Rüschegg about 56.8% of the population have completed non-mandatory upper secondary education, and 13.5% have completed additional higher education (either university or a Fachhochschule). Of the 125 who had completed some form of tertiary schooling listed in the census, 70.4% were Swiss men, 21.6% were Swiss women, 4.8% were non-Swiss men.

The Canton of Bern school system provides one year of non-obligatory Kindergarten, followed by six years of Primary school. This is followed by three years of obligatory lower Secondary school where the students are separated according to ability and aptitude. Following the lower Secondary students may attend additional schooling or they may enter an apprenticeship.

During the 2011-12 school year, there were a total of 120 students attending classes in Rüschegg. There was one kindergarten class with a total of 22 students in the municipality. The municipality had 4 primary classes and 75 students. Of the primary students, 2.7% have a different mother language than the classroom language. During the same year, there were 2 lower secondary classes with a total of 23 students.

As of 2000, there were a total of 212 students attending any school in the municipality. Of those, 191 both lived and attended school in the municipality, while 21 students came from another municipality. During the same year, 92 residents attended schools outside the municipality.
