= Gurnigel Pass =

Mountain in canton of Bern, Switzerland

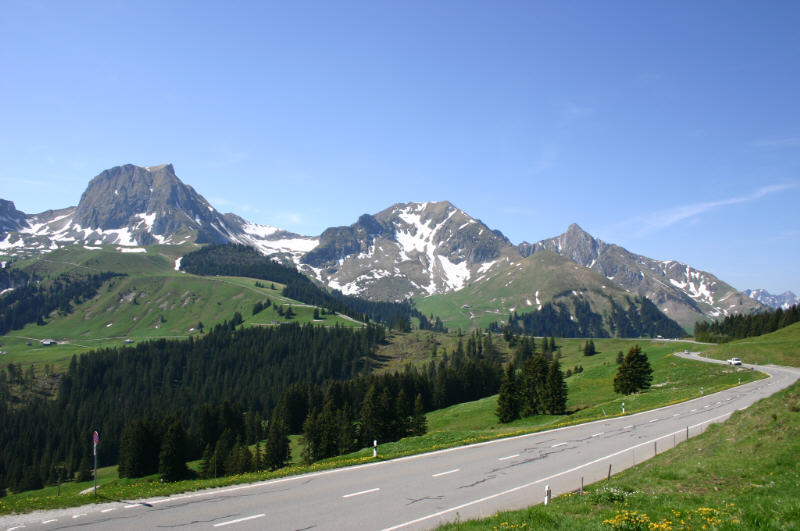
- Gurnigel Pass

- Location within Alps
- Elevation: 1,608 metres (5,276 ft)
- Traversed by: Road

Third Approach
- Location: Switzerland
- Coordinates: 46°43′55″N 07°25′52″E

Gurnigel Pass (el. 1608 m.) is a high mountain pass in the canton of Bern in Switzerland.

It connects Riggisberg and Zollhaus. The culminating point of the road lies on the eastern flank of the Selibüel.

The pass is the venue for an annual cross-country skiing race.

== See also ==
- List of highest paved roads in Europe
- List of mountain passes
- List of the highest Swiss passes
