= Oey-Diemtigen railway station =

Railway station in Diemtigen, Switzerland

Oey-Diemtigen
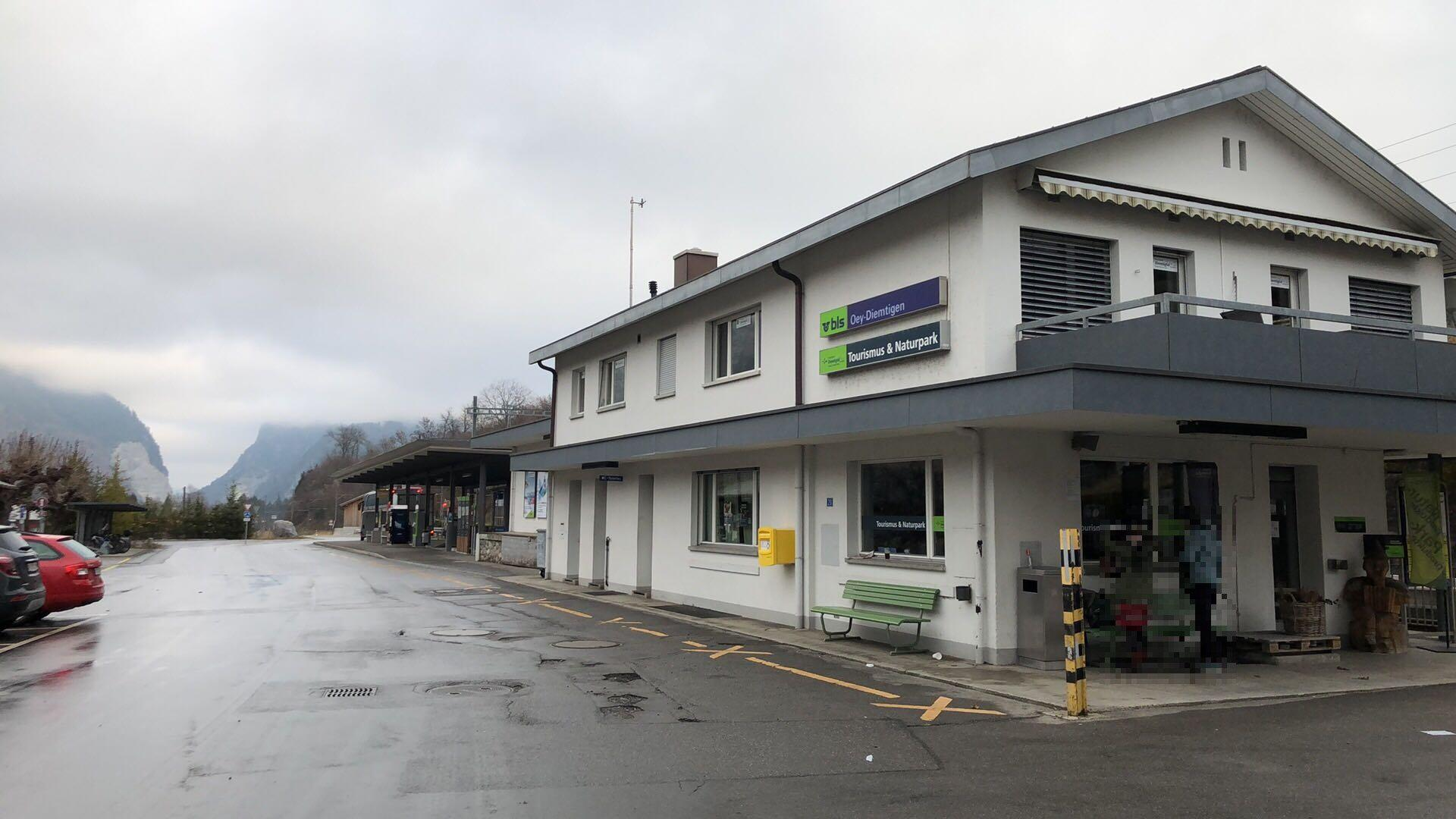
- The station building in 2019

General information
- Location: Diemtigen; Switzerland
- Coordinates: 46°39′36″N 7°34′44″E
- Elevation: 670 m (2,200 ft)
- Owner: BLS AG
- Line: Spiez–Zweisimmen line
- Distance: 9.3 km (5.8 mi) from Spiez
- Platforms: 2 (1 island platform)
- Tracks: 2
- Train operators: BLS AG
- Connections: PostAuto AG buses

Construction
- Parking: Yes (23 spaces)
- Accessible: Yes

Other information
- Station code: 8507297 (OE)
- Fare zone: 840 (Libero)

Passengers
- 2023: 480 per weekday (BLS)

Services
Preceding station	BLS	Following station
Erlenbach im Simmental towards Zweisimmen	RE8	Wimmis towards Spiez
Erlenbach im Simmental towards Zweisimmen	R11	Burgholz towards Bern
Erlenbach im Simmental towards Montreux	GoldenPass Express	Wimmis towards Interlaken Ost
Location

Oey-Diemtigen railway station (German: Bahnhof Oey-Diemtigen) is a railway station in the municipality of Diemtigen, in the Swiss canton of Bern. It is an intermediate stop on the Spiez–Zweisimmen line and is served by local and regional trains.

== Services ==
The following services stop at Oey-Diemtigen:

- RegioExpress: irregular service to Zweisimmen and Spiez.
- Regio: hourly service to Zweisimmen and Bern.
- GoldenPass Express: 4 daily round-trips between Montreux and Interlaken Ost.
