= Boltigen railway station =

Railway station in Boltigen, Switzerland

Boltigen
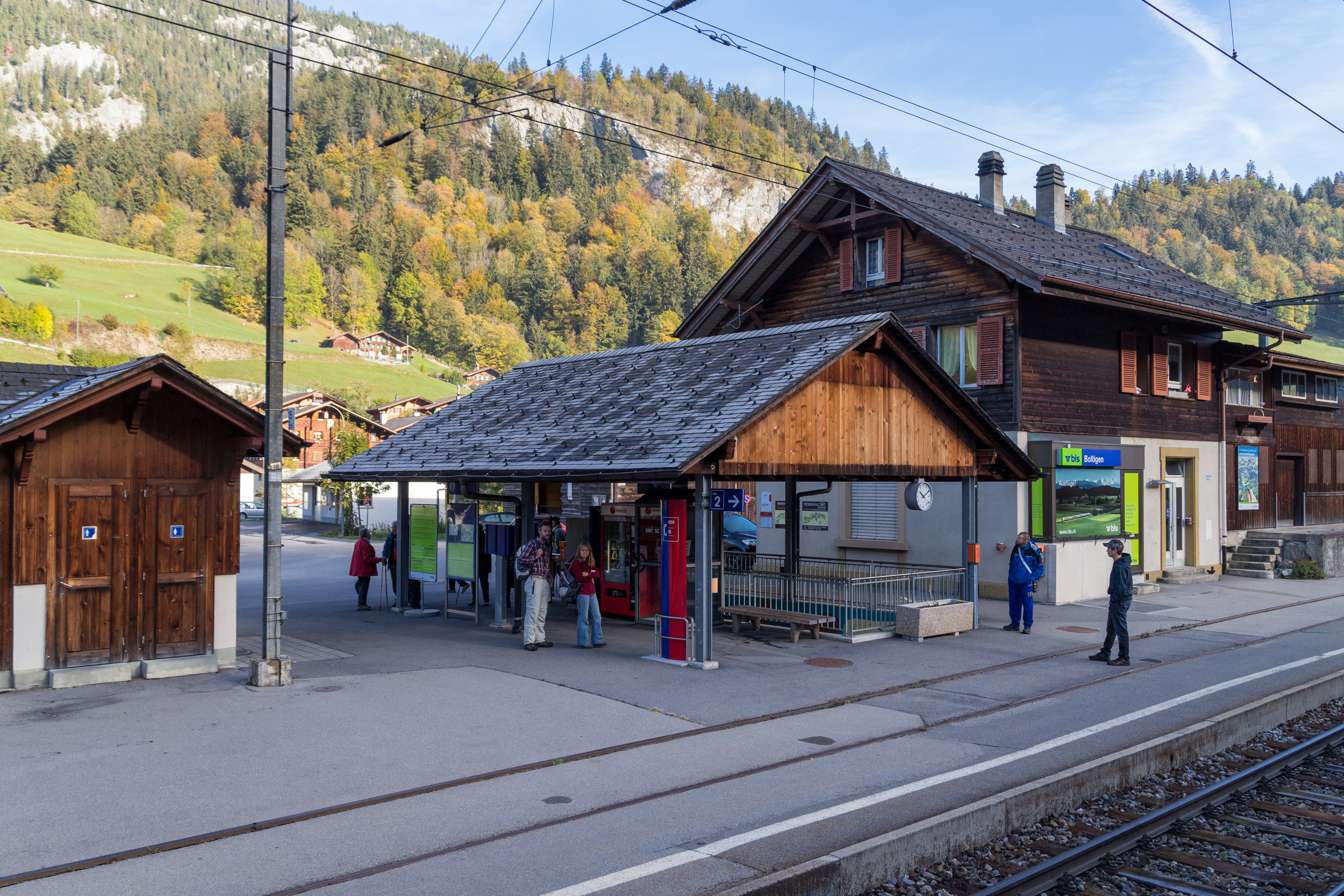
- The station building in 2011

General information
- Location: Boltigen; Switzerland
- Coordinates: 46°37′37″N 7°23′24″E
- Elevation: 817 m (2,680 ft)
- Owner: BLS AG
- Line: Spiez–Zweisimmen line
- Distance: 25.9 km (16.1 mi) from Spiez
- Platforms: 2 side platforms
- Tracks: 2
- Train operators: BLS AG
- Connections: PostAuto AG buses; TPF buses

Construction
- Accessible: Yes

Other information
- Station code: 8507292 (BOLT)
- Fare zone: 842 (Libero)

Passengers
- 2023: 250 per weekday (BLS)

Services
Preceding station	BLS	Following station
Zweisimmen Terminus	RE8	Erlenbach im Simmental towards Spiez
Zweisimmen Terminus	R11	Enge im Simmental towards Bern
Weissenbach towards Zweisimmen	R11 Limited service	Enge im Simmental towards Spiez
Zweisimmen towards Montreux	GoldenPass Express	Erlenbach im Simmental towards Interlaken Ost
Location

Boltigen railway station (German: Bahnhof Boltigen) is a railway station in the municipality of Boltigen, in the Swiss canton of Bern. It is an intermediate stop on the Spiez–Zweisimmen line and is served by local and regional trains.

== Services ==
The following services stop at Boltigen:

- RegioExpress: irregular service to Zweisimmen and Spiez.
- Regio: hourly service to Zweisimmen and Bern.
- GoldenPass Express: 4 daily round-trips between Montreux and Interlaken Ost.
