= Wimmis railway station =

Railway station in Wimmis, Switzerland

Wimmis
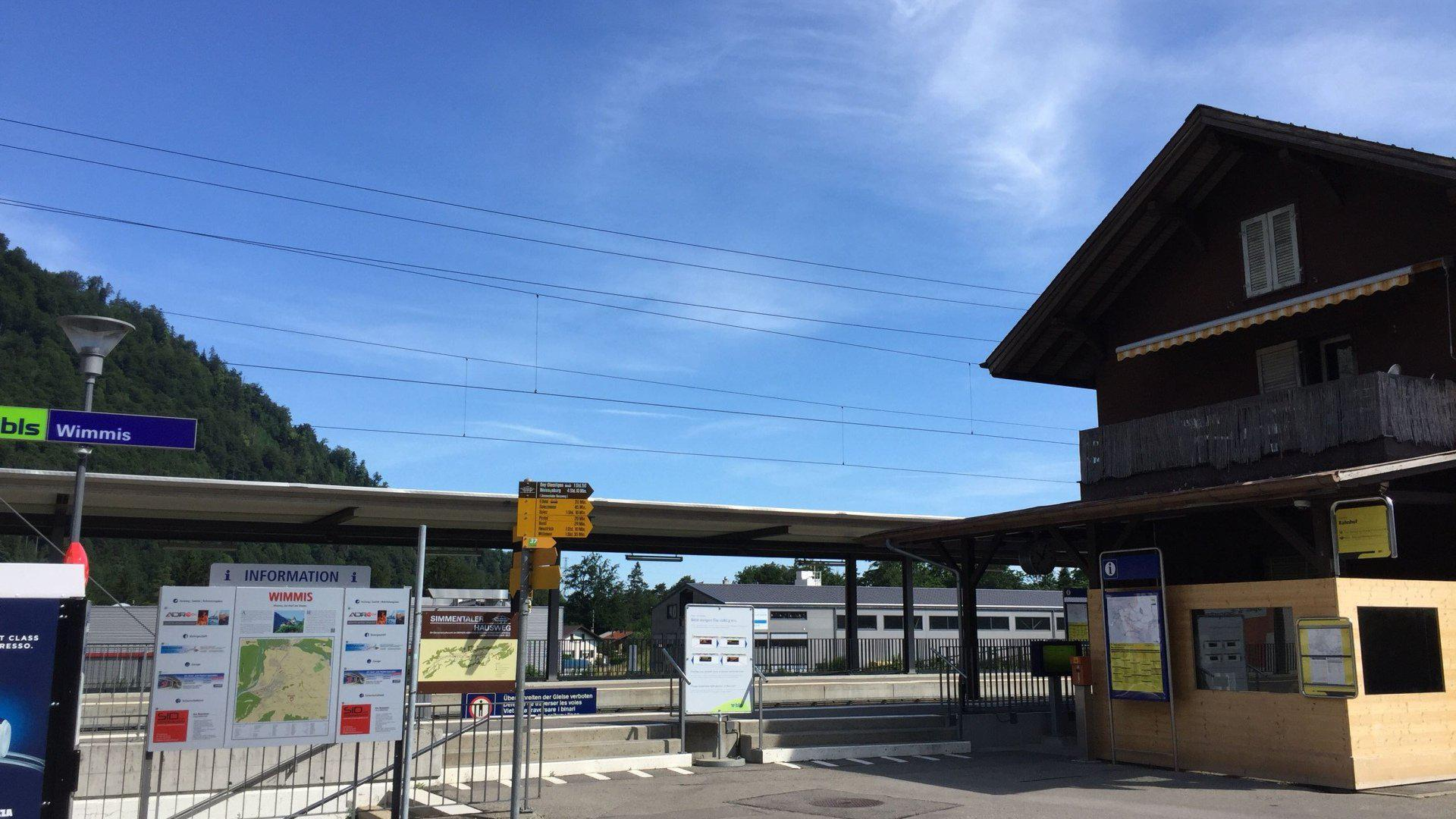
- The station platform and building in 2018

General information
- Location: Wimmis; Switzerland
- Coordinates: 46°40′34″N 7°38′06″E
- Elevation: 629 m (2,064 ft)
- Owner: BLS AG
- Line: Spiez–Zweisimmen line
- Distance: 4.5 km (2.8 mi) from Spiez
- Platforms: 2 side platforms
- Tracks: 2
- Train operators: BLS AG
- Connections: Verkehrsbetriebe STI buses

Construction
- Parking: Yes (14 spaces)
- Accessible: Yes

Other information
- Station code: 8507298 (WM)
- Fare zone: 840/720 (Libero)

Passengers
- 2023: 530 per weekday (BLS)

Services
Preceding station	BLS	Following station
Oey-Diemtigen towards Zweisimmen	RE8	Spiez Terminus
Burgholz towards Zweisimmen	R11	Eifeld towards Bern
Oey-Diemtigen towards Montreux	GoldenPass Express	Spiez towards Interlaken Ost
Location

Wimmis railway station (German: Bahnhof Wimmis) is a railway station in the municipality of Wimmis, in the Swiss canton of Bern. It is an intermediate stop on the Spiez–Zweisimmen line and is served by local and regional trains.

== Services ==
The following services stop at Wimmis:

- RegioExpress: irregular service to Zweisimmen and Spiez.
- Regio: hourly service to Zweisimmen and Bern.
- GoldenPass Express: four daily round-trips between Montreux and Interlaken Ost.
