= Erlenbach im Simmental railway station =

Railway station in Erlenbach im Simmental, Switzerland

Erlenbach im Simmental
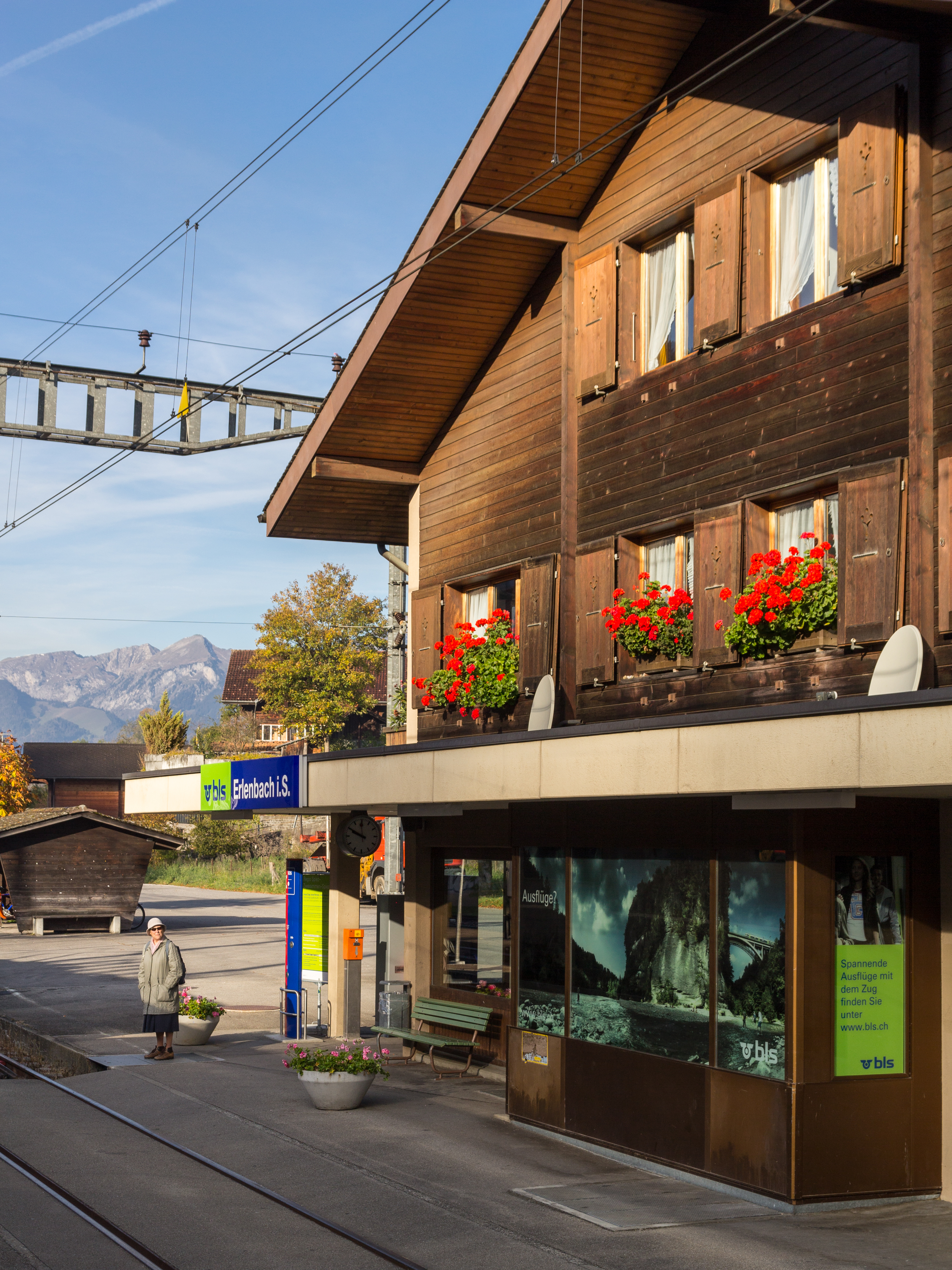
- The station building in 2011 before the rebuilding of the station

General information
- Location: Erlenbach im Simmental; Switzerland
- Coordinates: 46°39′32″N 7°33′22″E
- Elevation: 681 m (2,234 ft)
- Owner: BLS AG
- Line: Spiez–Zweisimmen line
- Distance: 11.3 km (7.0 mi) from Spiez
- Platforms: 2 side platforms
- Tracks: 2
- Train operators: BLS AG

Construction
- Accessible: Yes

Other information
- Station code: 8507296 (EBIS)
- Fare zone: 840 (Libero)

Passengers
- 2023: 430 per weekday (BLS)

Services
Preceding station	BLS	Following station
Boltigen towards Zweisimmen	RE8	Oey-Diemtigen towards Spiez
Ringoldingen towards Zweisimmen	R11	Oey-Diemtigen towards Bern
Boltigen towards Montreux	GoldenPass Express	Oey-Diemtigen towards Interlaken Ost
Location

Erlenbach im Simmental railway station (German: Bahnhof Erlenbach im Simmental) is a railway station in the municipality of Erlenbach im Simmental, in the Swiss canton of Bern. It is an intermediate stop on the Spiez–Zweisimmen line and is served by local and regional trains. The station is 850 metres (2,790 ft) east of the valley station of the Stockhornbahn cableway to the top of the Stockhorn.

== Services ==
The following services stop at Erlenbach im Simmental:

- RegioExpress: irregular service to Zweisimmen and Spiez.
- Regio: hourly service to Zweisimmen and Bern.
- GoldenPass Express: 4 daily round-trips between Montreux and Interlaken Ost.
