= Enge im Simmental railway station =

Railway station in Oberwil im Simmental, Switzerland

Enge im Simmental
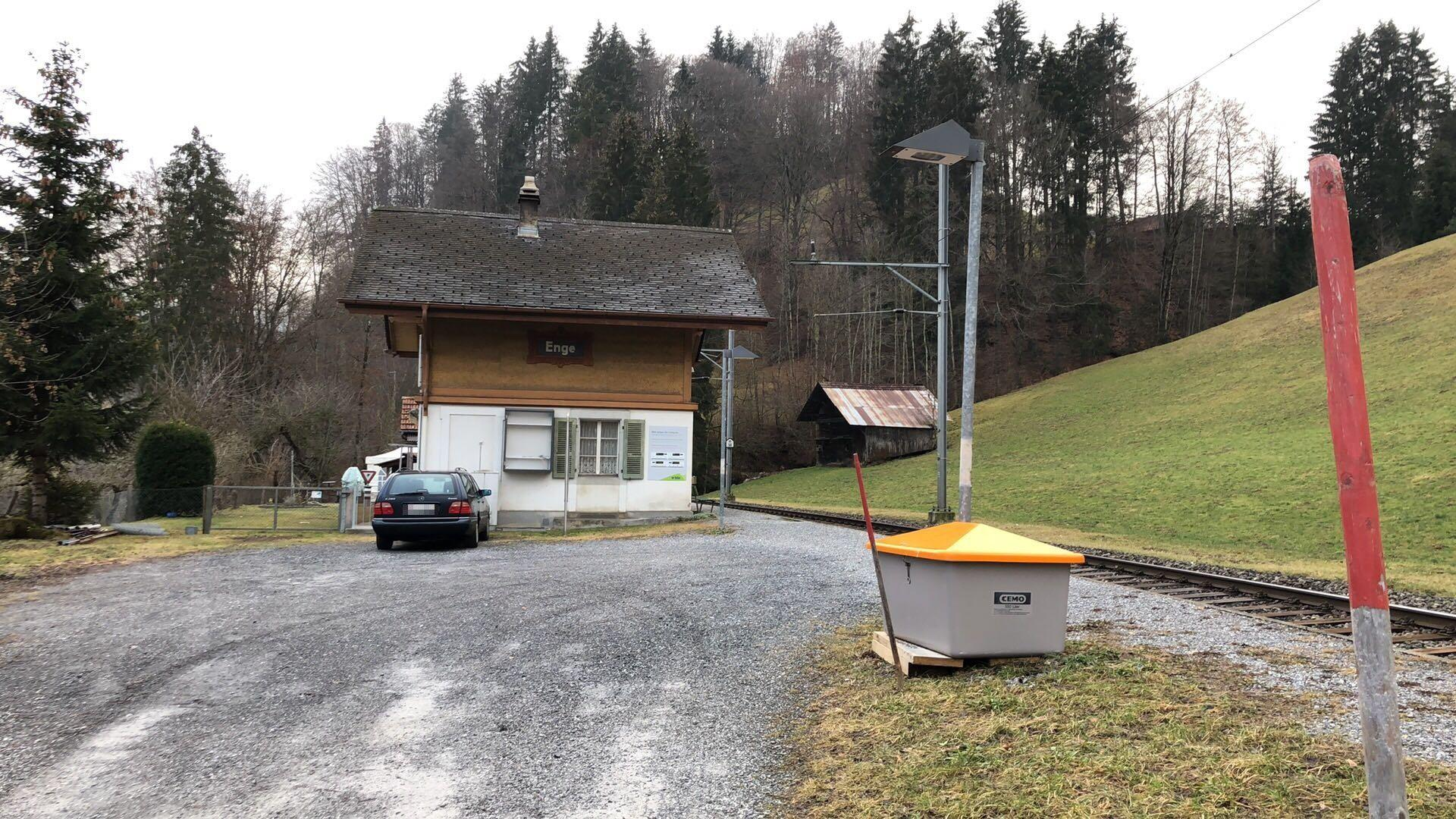
- The station building in 2019

General information
- Location: Oberwil im Simmental; Switzerland
- Coordinates: 46°38′49″N 7°25′05″E
- Elevation: 814 m (2,671 ft)
- Owner: BLS AG
- Line: Spiez–Zweisimmen line
- Distance: 22.6 km (14.0 mi) from Spiez
- Platforms: 1 side platform
- Tracks: 1
- Train operators: BLS AG

Construction
- Accessible: No

Other information
- Station code: 8507284 (ENGE)
- Fare zone: 842 (Libero)

Passengers
- 2023: Fewer than 50 persons per day (BLS)

Services
Preceding station	BLS	Following station
Boltigen towards Zweisimmen	R11	Oberwil im Simmental towards Bern
Location

Enge im Simmental railway station (German: Bahnhof Enge im Simmental) is a railway station in the municipality of Oberwil im Simmental, in the Swiss canton of Bern. It is an intermediate stop on the Spiez–Zweisimmen line and is served as a request stop by local trains only.

== Services ==
The following services stop at Enge im Simmental:

- Regio: hourly service to Zweisimmen and Bern.
