= Weissenbach railway station =

Railway station in Boltigen, Switzerland

Weissenbach
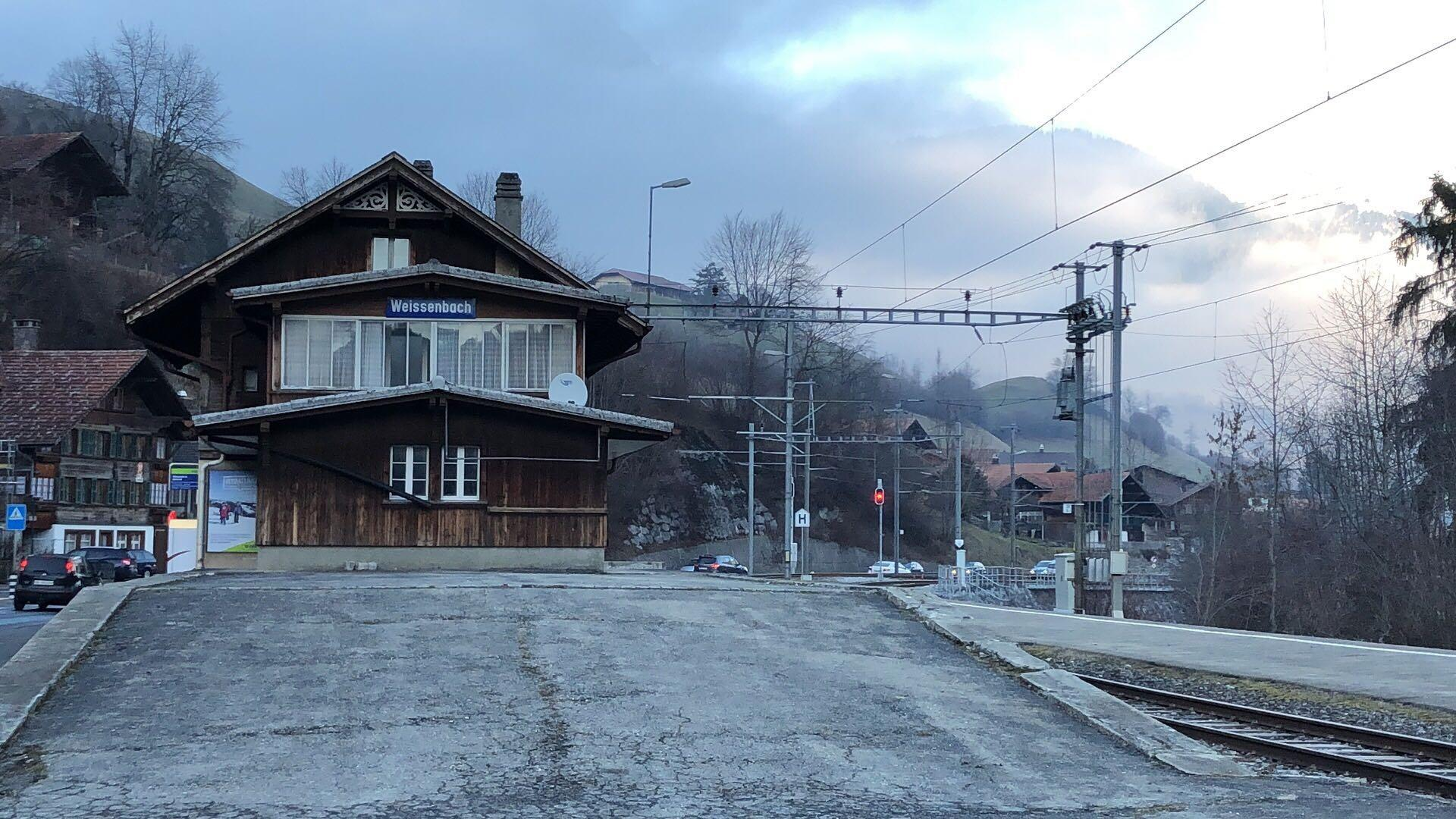
- The station building in 2019

General information
- Location: Boltigen; Switzerland
- Coordinates: 46°36′14″N 7°22′26″E
- Elevation: 843 m (2,766 ft)
- Owner: BLS AG
- Line: Spiez–Zweisimmen line
- Distance: 28.9 km (18.0 mi) from Spiez
- Platforms: 1
- Tracks: 2
- Train operators: BLS AG
- Connections: PostAuto AG buses

Construction
- Parking: Yes (20 spaces)
- Accessible: No

Other information
- Station code: 8507291 (WBA)
- Fare zone: 842 (Libero)

Passengers
- 2023: Fewer than 50 persons per day (BLS)

Services
Preceding station	BLS	Following station
Grubenwald towards Zweisimmen	R11 Limited service	Boltigen towards Spiez
Location

Weissenbach railway station (German: Bahnhof Weissenbach) is a railway station in the municipality of Boltigen, in the Swiss canton of Bern. It is an intermediate stop on the Spiez–Zweisimmen line and is served by local trains only.

== History ==
The station was established with the opening of the Erlenbach Zweisimmen railway in 1902. The State Archives of the Canton of Bern holds a photograph documenting the opening train at Weissenbach in 1902.

== Services ==
The following services stop at Weissenbach:

- Regio: late-night service to Zweisimmen and Spiez.
