= Ringoldingen railway station =

Railway station in Erlenbach im Simmental, Switzerland

Ringoldingen
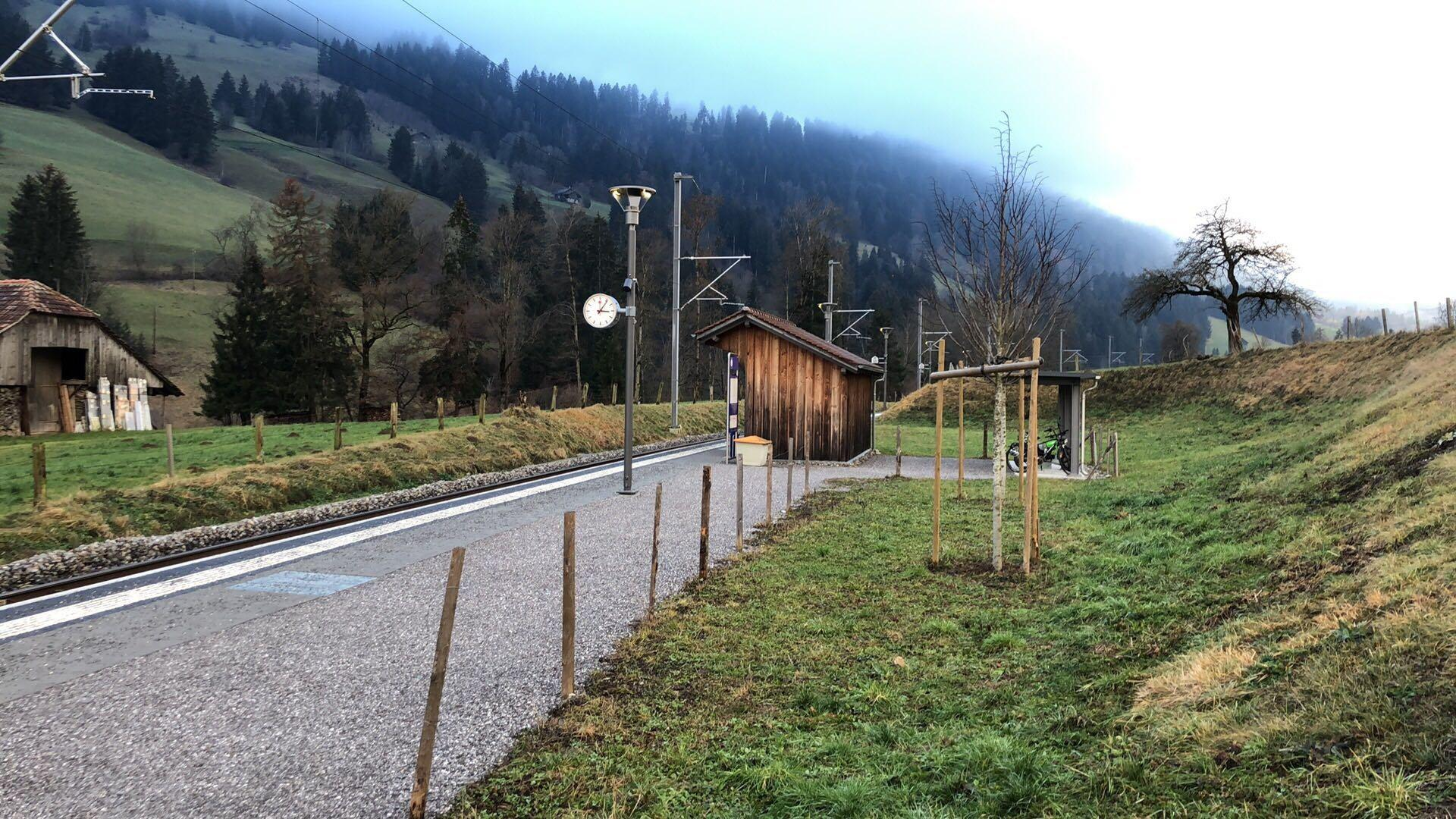
- The platform and shelter in 2019

General information
- Location: Erlenbach im Simmental; Switzerland
- Coordinates: 46°39′29″N 7°31′30″E
- Elevation: 712 m (2,336 ft)
- Owner: BLS AG
- Line: Spiez–Zweisimmen line
- Distance: 13.8 km (8.6 mi) from Spiez
- Platforms: 1 side platform
- Tracks: 1
- Train operators: BLS AG

Construction
- Accessible: Yes

Other information
- Station code: 8507286 (RGD)
- Fare zone: 840/841 (Libero)

Passengers
- 2023: Fewer than 50 persons per day (BLS)

Services
| Preceding station | BLS | Following station |
|---|---|---|
| Därstetten towards Zweisimmen | R11 | Erlenbach im Simmental towards Bern |
Location

Ringoldingen railway station (German: Bahnhof Ringoldingen) is a railway station in the municipality of Erlenbach im Simmental, in the Swiss canton of Bern. It is an intermediate stop on the Spiez–Zweisimmen line and is served as a request stop by local trains only.

== Services ==
The following services stop at Ringoldingen:

- Regio: hourly service to Zweisimmen and Bern.
