= Grubenwald railway station =

Railway station in Zweisimmen, Switzerland

Grubenwald
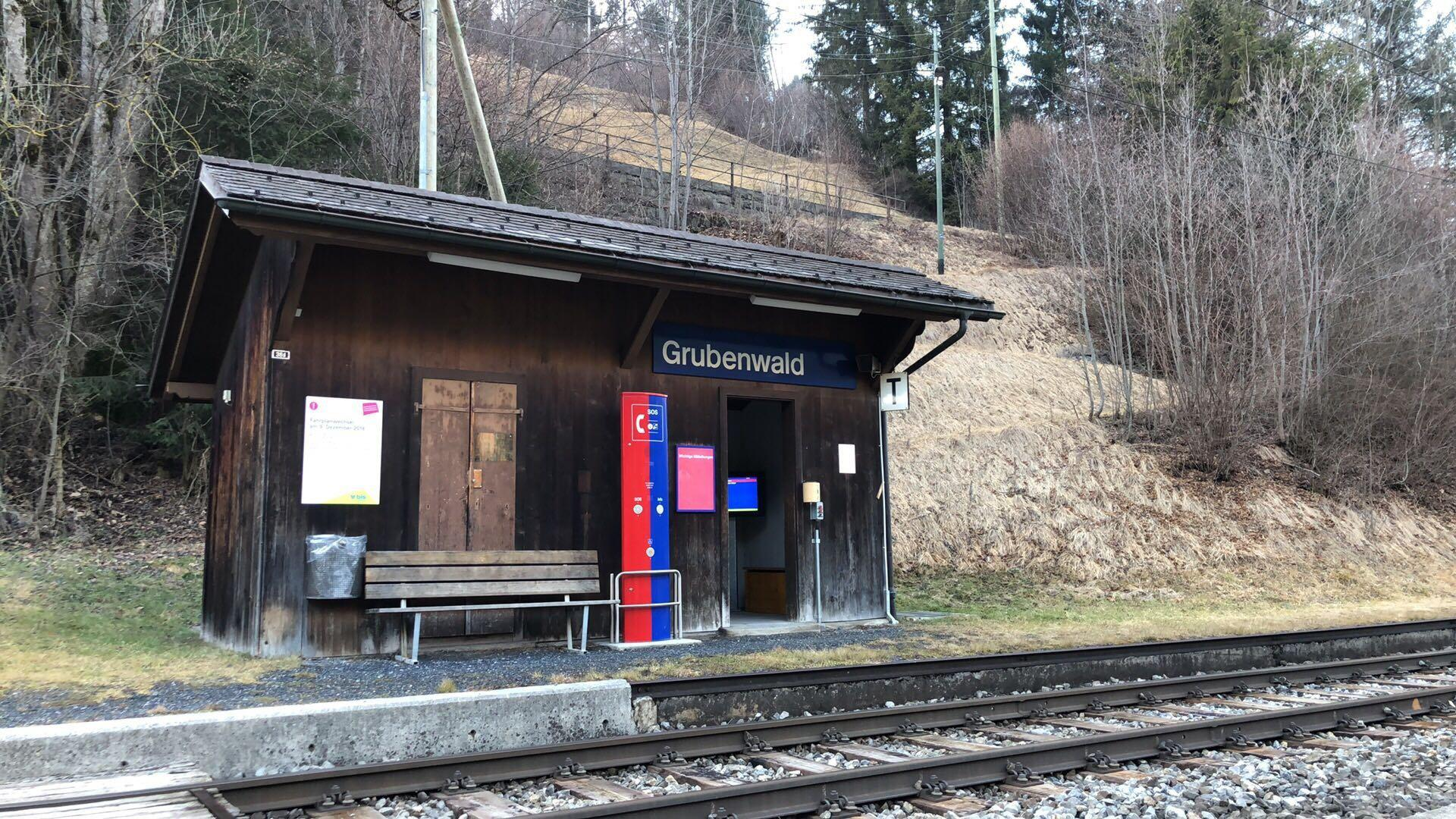
- The shelter in 2019

General information
- Location: Zweisimmen; Switzerland
- Coordinates: 46°34′48″N 7°22′59″E
- Elevation: 910 m (2,990 ft)
- Owner: BLS AG
- Line: Spiez–Zweisimmen line
- Distance: 31.8 km (19.8 mi) from Spiez
- Platforms: 1 side platform
- Tracks: 1
- Train operators: BLS AG
- Connections: PostAuto AG buses

Construction
- Accessible: No

Other information
- Station code: 8507281 (GRU)
- Fare zone: 842/843 (Libero)

Passengers
- 2023: Fewer than 50 persons per day (BLS)

Services
Preceding station	BLS	Following station
Zweisimmen Terminus	R11 Limited service	Weissenbach towards Spiez
Location

Grubenwald railway station (German: Bahnhof Grubenwald) is a railway station in the municipality of Zweisimmen, in the Swiss canton of Bern. It is an intermediate stop on the Spiez–Zweisimmen line and is served as a request stop by local trains only.

== Services ==
The following services stop at Grubenwald:

- Regio: late-night service to Zweisimmen and Spiez.
