= Lattigen bei Spiez railway station =

Railway station in Spiez, Switzerland

Lattigen bei Spiez
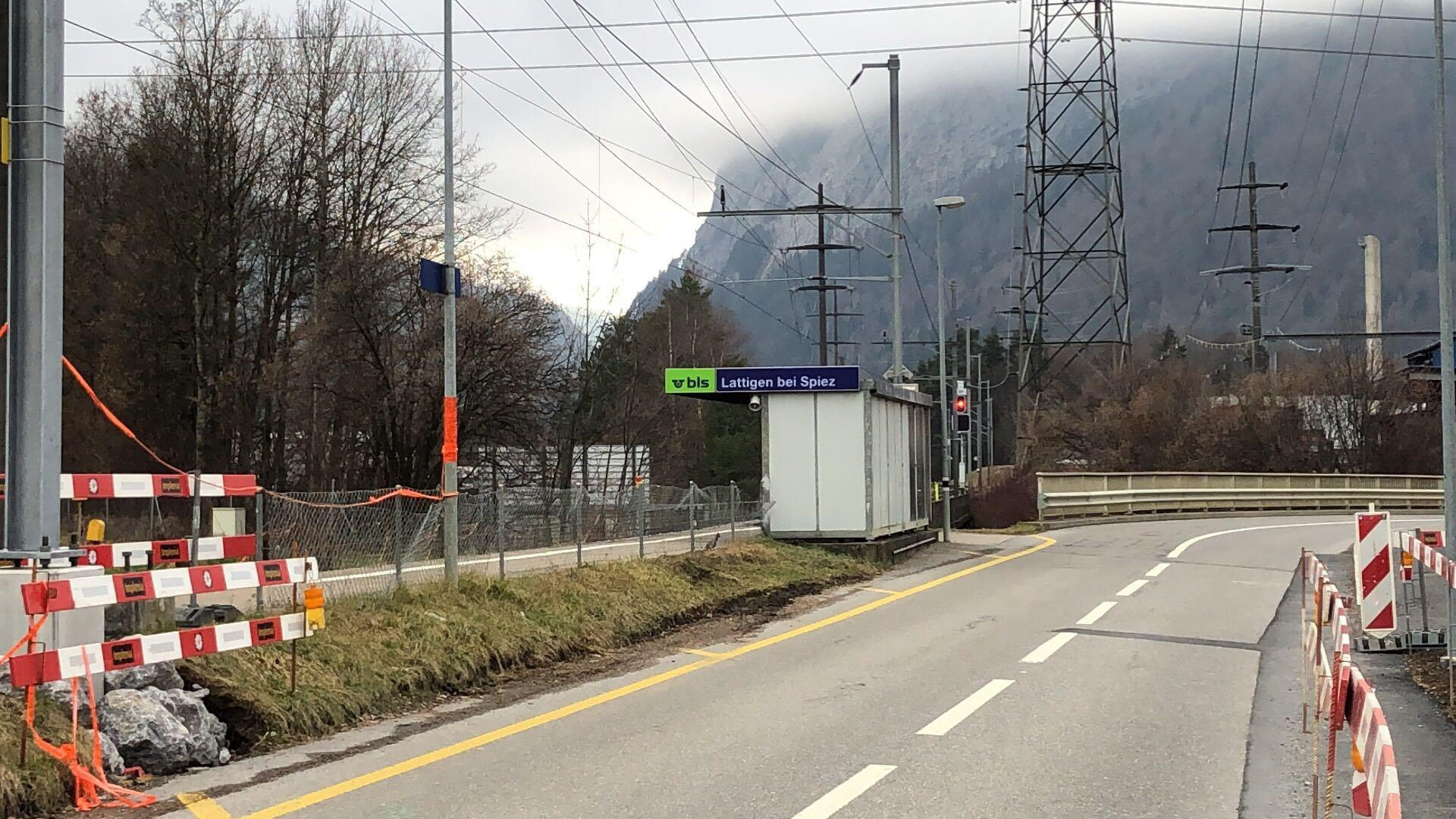
- The station platform and shelter in 2019

General information
- Location: Spiez; Switzerland
- Coordinates: 46°41′28″N 7°39′04″E
- Elevation: 625 m (2,051 ft)
- Owner: BLS AG
- Line: Spiez–Zweisimmen line
- Distance: 2.5 km (1.6 mi) from Spiez
- Platforms: 1 side platform
- Tracks: 1
- Train operators: BLS AG

Construction
- Accessible: Yes

Other information
- Station code: 8507299 (LAT)
- Fare zone: 720 (Libero)

Passengers
- 2023: 120 per weekday (BLS)

Services
Preceding station	BLS	Following station
Eifeld towards Zweisimmen	R11	Spiez towards Bern
Location

Lattigen bei Spiez railway station (German: Bahnhof Lattigen bei Spiez) is a railway station in the municipality of Spiez, in the Swiss canton of Bern. It is an intermediate stop on the Spiez–Zweisimmen line and is served as a request stop by local trains only.

== Services ==
The following services stop at Lattigen bei Spiez:

- Regio: hourly service to Zweisimmen and Bern.
