= Diemtigen =

- Municipality
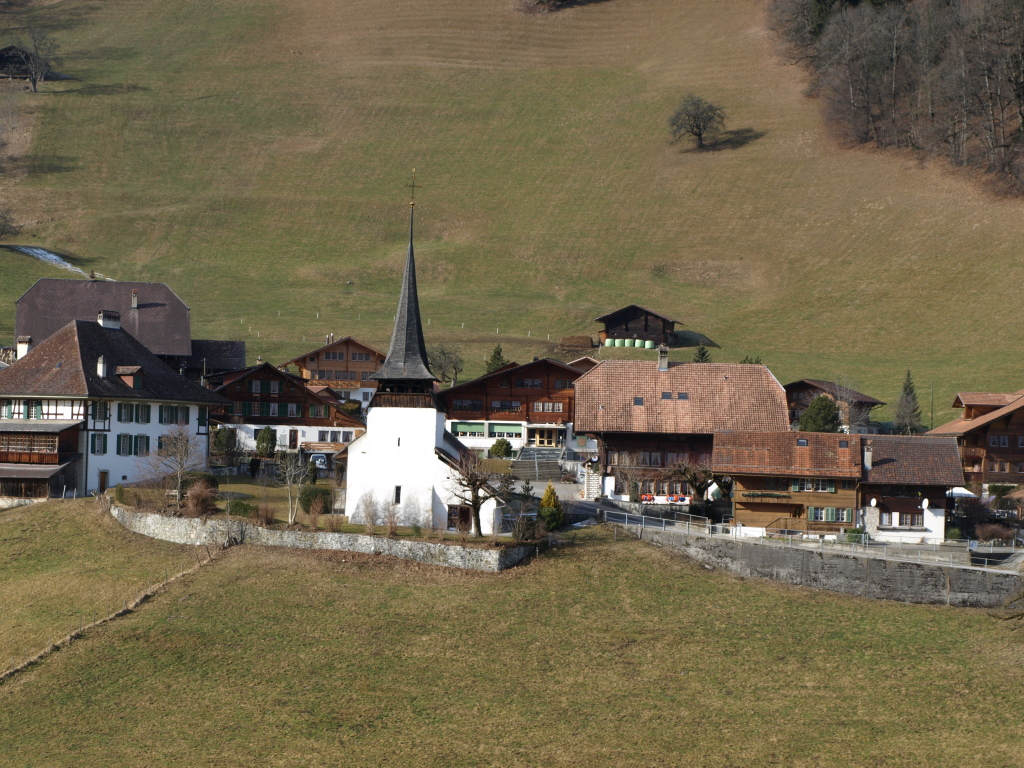

- Flag Coat of arms
- Location of Diemtigen
- Location within Switzerland Location within Canton of Bern
- Coordinates: 46°38′N 7°33′E
- Country: Switzerland
- Canton: Bern
- District: Frutigen-Niedersimmental

Government
  - Executive: Gemeinderat with 9 members
  - Mayor: Gemeindepräsident(in); Jürg Stucki (as of 2026)

Area
  - Total: 130.0 km^{2} (50.2 sq mi)
- Elevation: 609 m (1,998 ft)

Population (December 2020)
  - Total: 2,253
  - Density: 17.33/km^{2} (44.89/sq mi)
- Time zone: UTC+01:00 (CET)
  - Summer (DST): UTC+02:00 (CEST)
- Postal code: 3753
- SFOS number: 762
- ISO 3166 code: CH-BE
- Surrounded by: Adelboden, Boltigen, Därstetten, Erlenbach im Simmental, Frutigen, Oberwil im Simmental, Reichenbach im Kandertal, Sankt Stephan, Wimmis, Zweisimmen
- Website: www.diemtigen.ch

Diemtigen (German pronunciation: [ˈdiːmtɪɡn̩]; Highest Alemannic: Diemtige) is a village and a municipality of the Frutigen-Niedersimmental administrative district in the canton of Bern in Switzerland. It is located at the northern end of the Diemtigtal elevated on a plateau west above the creek Chirel.

In 1986, the community was awarded the Wakker Prize for preservation of its architectural heritage.

== History ==
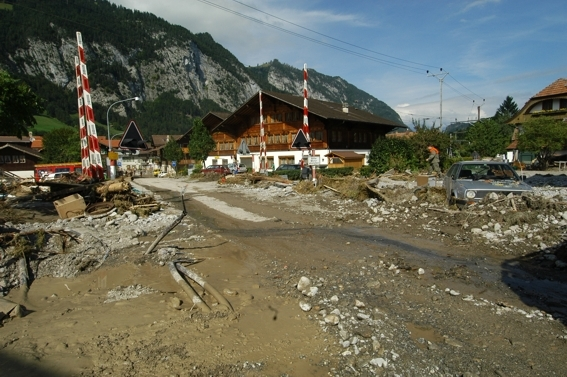
Aftermath of a flash flood in 2005 in Diemtigen.

Aerial view (1967)

Diemtigen is first mentioned in 1257 as Diemtingen.

The Diemtigen area was inhabited during the Bronze Age and possibly during the Mesolithic Era. It was permanently inhabited and fortified by the High Middle Ages. The heights above the valleys are home to several castles or castle ruins. No records exist and very little is known about the ruins of Kronegg Castle, above Eggwald, and Grafenstein Castle, above Oey. The third castle, Hasenburg near Diemtigen was first mentioned in 1257 as castrum de Diemtingen and in the 12th and 13th centuries was the seat of the Freiherr von Strättligen. After the 12th century the castle and lands passed through several noble families until the Bernese von Scharnachtal family acquired it and in 1439 sold it to the city of Bern. A set of laws and privileges were granted to the villagers of the entire valley in 1361 and again in 1393. In 1649 the laws governing the entire valley were codified. Beginning in the 15th century passes from the Diemtigen valley into Adelboden, Lenk and Zweisimmen opened up local trade. By the 16th century, the villagers in the valley bought grain from the lowlands, raised cattle in alpine meadows and then exported the cattle over the passes. While a little silver and coal were found in the mountains, there was never enough to support mines. Due to limited farmland and poverty, many residents left the valley. Before the 19th century it was into mercenary service, while after 1800 they emigrated to North America, Germany or Russia. Following the 1798 French invasion, Diemtigen became part of the Helvetic Republic Canton of Oberland. With the Act of Mediation in 1803 it returned to the Canton of Bern.

Beginning in the 18th century, several alpine spas were built around natural mineral springs. Two of the most famous, the Rothbad Horben and the Kurhaus Grimmialp in Schwenden opened the village up to tourism. The construction of Simmentalstrasse (Simmental road) and the Spiez-Zweisimmen railroad in 1897 opened up the valley to many new businesses and brought in an increasing number of tourists. The railroad station was built in the village of Oey, which grew into the population and administrative center of the municipality. In 1963 the municipality built a hotel and sport complex to encourage further tourism. Today, tourism is an important component in the local economy. However, agriculture still remains important and Diemtigen has 107 seasonal alpine pastures, the most of any Swiss municipality.

The village church of St. Nicholas in Diemtigen village was first mentioned in 1314 and was a filial church of the parish church in Schwenden. The original building was extended in 1490. In 1527 the valley adopted the new faith of the Protestant Reformation and the village church became a parish church for the new Reformed parish of Diemtigen.

== Geography ==
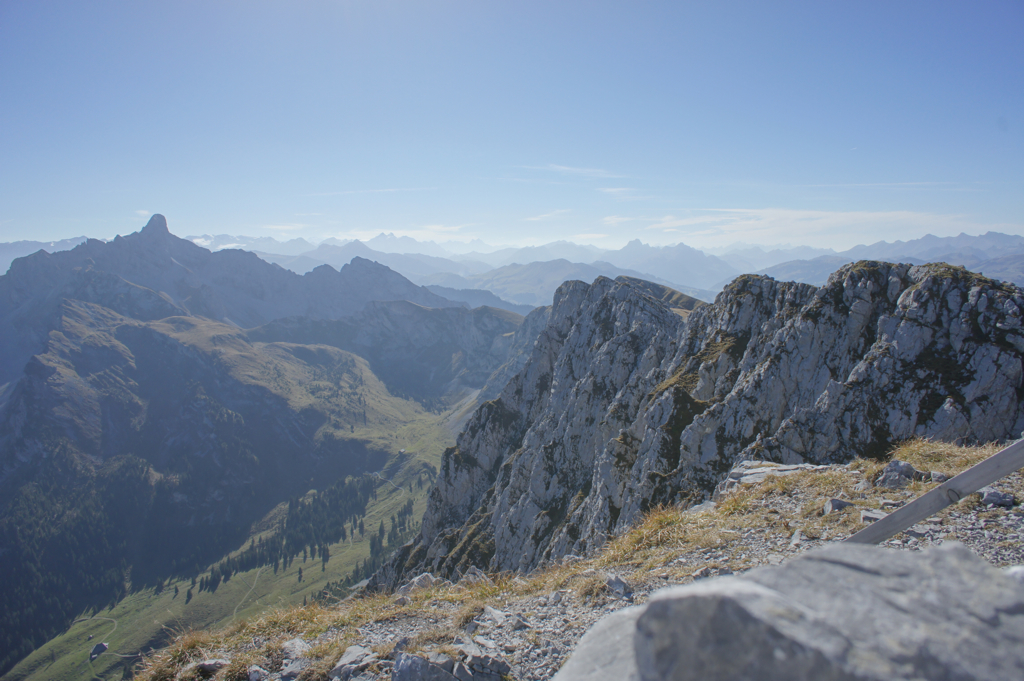
View from the Seehorn mountain near Diemtigen

Diemtigen has an area of 129.94 km^{2} (50.17 sq mi). As of 2012, a total of 62.4 km^{2} (24.1 mi^{2}) or 48.0% is used for agricultural purposes, while 39.51 km^{2} (15.25 mi^{2}) or 30.4% is forested. The rest of the municipality is 2.27 km^{2} (0.88 mi^{2}) or 1.7% is settled (buildings or roads), 0.6 km^{2} (0.23 mi^{2}) or 0.5% is either rivers or lakes and 25.24 km^{2} (9.75 mi^{2}) or 19.4% is unproductive land.

During the same year, housing and buildings made up 0.7% and transportation infrastructure made up 0.8%. A total of 25.5% of the total land area is heavily forested and 3.7% is covered with orchards or small clusters of trees. Of the agricultural land, 9.5% is pasturage and 38.2% is used for alpine pastures. All the water in the municipality is flowing water. Of the unproductive areas, 9.1% is unproductive vegetation and 10.3% is too rocky for vegetation.

The municipality is located in the Diemtig valley and several neighboring valleys. It consists of the settlements of Oey, Diemtigen, Bächlen, Horben, Riedern, Entschwil, Zwischenflüh, Schwenden and the "Sporthalle Diemtigtal" as well as a number of small settlements in alpine meadows and forests above the valleys.

On 31 December 2009 Amtsbezirk Niedersimmental, the municipality's former district, was dissolved. On the following day, 1 January 2010, it joined the newly created Verwaltungskreis Frutigen-Niedersimmental.

== Coat of arms ==
The blazon of the municipal coat of arms is Per pale Gules and Argent a Castle embattled counterchanged.

== Demographics ==
Diemtigen has a population (as of December 2020) of 2,253. As of 2010, 3.3% of the population are resident foreign nationals. Over the last 10 years (2001-2011) the population has changed at a rate of -0.7%. Migration accounted for -1.4%, while births and deaths accounted for 0.2%.

Most of the population (as of 2000) speaks German (2,017 or 98.2%) as their first language, Albanian is the second most common (10 or 0.5%) and Serbo-Croatian is the third (9 or 0.4%). There are 4 people who speak French, 3 people who speak Italian and 1 person who speaks Romansh.

As of 2008, the population was 50.4% male and 49.6% female. The population was made up of 1,046 Swiss men (48.6% of the population) and 39 (1.8%) non-Swiss men. There were 1,037 Swiss women (48.1%) and 32 (1.5%) non-Swiss women. Of the population in the municipality, 1,235 or about 60.1% were born in Diemtigen and lived there in 2000. There were 539 or 26.2% who were born in the same canton, while 150 or 7.3% were born somewhere else in Switzerland, and 83 or 4.0% were born outside of Switzerland.

As of 2011, children and teenagers (0–19 years old) make up 23% of the population, while adults (20–64 years old) make up 58.2% and seniors (over 64 years old) make up 18.8%.

As of 2000, there were 882 people who were single and never married in the municipality. There were 994 married individuals, 126 widows or widowers and 52 individuals who are divorced.

As of 2010, there were 266 households that consist of only one person and 91 households with five or more people. In 2000, a total of 726 apartments (59.6% of the total) were permanently occupied, while 432 apartments (35.4%) were seasonally occupied and 61 apartments (5.0%) were empty. As of 2010, the construction rate of new housing units was 1.4 new units per 1000 residents. In 2011, single family homes made up 39.2% of the total housing in the municipality.

The historical population is given in the following chart:

== Wakker Prize ==
The Wakker prize is given each year by the Swiss Heritage Society to a Municipality of Switzerland for the development and preservation of its architectural heritage. In 1986, Diemtigen was given the prize for consistent planning that remained spared much of an area measuring 130 km^{2} (50 sq mi) from development. The scattered nature of the municipality made this more difficult, because there are many scattered land owners with different goals. However, the municipality was able to create a number of large landscape protection zones, which limited and concentrated holiday house areas to a few places.

== Heritage sites of national significance ==
The farm house in Oey at Sälbezen 714 and the farm house at Trogmatte 32 are listed as Swiss heritage site of national significance. The entire village of Diemtigen is part of the Inventory of Swiss Heritage Sites.

== Politics ==
In the 2011 federal election the most popular party was the Swiss People's Party (SVP) which received 63.3% of the vote. The next three most popular parties were the Conservative Democratic Party (BDP) (14.2%), the Social Democratic Party (SP) (6.2%) and the Federal Democratic Union of Switzerland (EDU) (3.8%). In the federal election, a total of 871 votes were cast, and the voter turnout was 51.4%.

== Economy ==
As of 2011, Diemtigen had an unemployment rate of 1.19%. As of 2008, there were a total of 1,028 people employed in the municipality. Of these, there were 383 people employed in the primary economic sector and about 138 businesses involved in this sector. 304 people were employed in the secondary sector and there were 47 businesses in this sector. 341 people were employed in the tertiary sector, with 80 businesses in this sector. There were 1,072 residents of the municipality who were employed in some capacity, of which females made up 40.3% of the workforce.

In 2008 there were a total of 739 full-time equivalent jobs. The number of jobs in the primary sector was 221, of which 219 were in agriculture and 2 were in forestry or lumber production. The number of jobs in the secondary sector was 277 of which 165 or (59.6%) were in manufacturing and 111 (40.1%) were in construction. The number of jobs in the tertiary sector was 241. In the tertiary sector; 52 or 21.6% were in wholesale or retail sales or the repair of motor vehicles, 37 or 15.4% were in the movement and storage of goods, 82 or 34.0% were in a hotel or restaurant, 12 or 5.0% were the insurance or financial industry, 11 or 4.6% were technical professionals or scientists, 16 or 6.6% were in education and 11 or 4.6% were in health care.

In 2000, there were 242 workers who commuted into the municipality and 425 workers who commuted away. The municipality is a net exporter of workers, with about 1.8 workers leaving the municipality for every one entering. A total of 647 workers (72.8% of the 889 total workers in the municipality) both lived and worked in Diemtigen. Of the working population, 7.9% used public transportation to get to work, and 54.3% used a private car.

In 2011 the average local and cantonal tax rate on a married resident, with two children, of Diemtigen making 150,000 CHF was 13%, while an unmarried resident's rate was 19.1%. For comparison, the average rate for the entire canton in the same year, was 14.2% and 22.0%, while the nationwide average was 12.3% and 21.1% respectively. In 2009 there were a total of 841 tax payers in the municipality. Of that total, 176 made over 75,000 CHF per year. There were 5 people who made between 15,000 and 20,000 per year. The greatest number of workers, 214, made between 50,000 and 75,000 CHF per year. The average income of the over 75,000 CHF group in Diemtigen was 107,050 CHF, while the average across all of Switzerland was 130,478 CHF.

In 2011 a total of 1.7% of the population received direct financial assistance from the government.

== Religion ==
From the 2000 census, 1,833 or 89.2% belonged to the Swiss Reformed Church, while 57 or 2.8% were Roman Catholic. Of the rest of the population, there were 9 members of an Orthodox church (or about 0.44% of the population), there was 1 individual who belongs to the Christian Catholic Church, and there were 50 individuals (or about 2.43% of the population) who belonged to another Christian church. There were 12 (or about 0.58% of the population) who were Islamic. There were 2 individuals who belonged to another church. 50 (or about 2.43% of the population) belonged to no church, are agnostic or atheist, and 40 individuals (or about 1.95% of the population) did not answer the question.

== Transport ==
Diemtigen sits on the Spiez–Zweisimmen line and is served by trains at the Wimmis and Burgholz railway stations.

== Education ==
In Diemtigen about 51.1% of the population have completed non-mandatory upper secondary education, and 10.7% have completed additional higher education (either university or a Fachhochschule). Of the 134 who had completed some form of tertiary schooling listed in the census, 73.1% were Swiss men, 19.4% were Swiss women and 4.5% were non-Swiss women.

The Canton of Bern school system provides one year of non-obligatory Kindergarten, followed by six years of Primary school. This is followed by three years of obligatory lower Secondary school where the students are separated according to ability and aptitude. Following the lower Secondary students may attend additional schooling or they may enter an apprenticeship.

During the 2011-12 school year, there were a total of 259 students attending classes in Diemtigen. There were 3 kindergarten classes with a total of 51 students in the municipality. The municipality had 7 primary classes and 136 students. Of the primary students, 1.5% were permanent or temporary residents of Switzerland (not citizens) and 0.7% have a different mother language than the classroom language. During the same year, there were 3 lower secondary classes with a total of 57 students. There were 1.8% who were permanent or temporary residents of Switzerland (not citizens). The remainder of the students attend a private or special school.

As of 2000, there were a total of 281 students attending any school in the municipality. Of those, 240 both lived and attended school in the municipality, while 41 students came from another municipality. During the same year, 74 residents attended schools outside the municipality.

== See also ==
- Nature parks in Switzerland
