= Blankenburg railway station =

Train station in Switzerland

Blankenburg
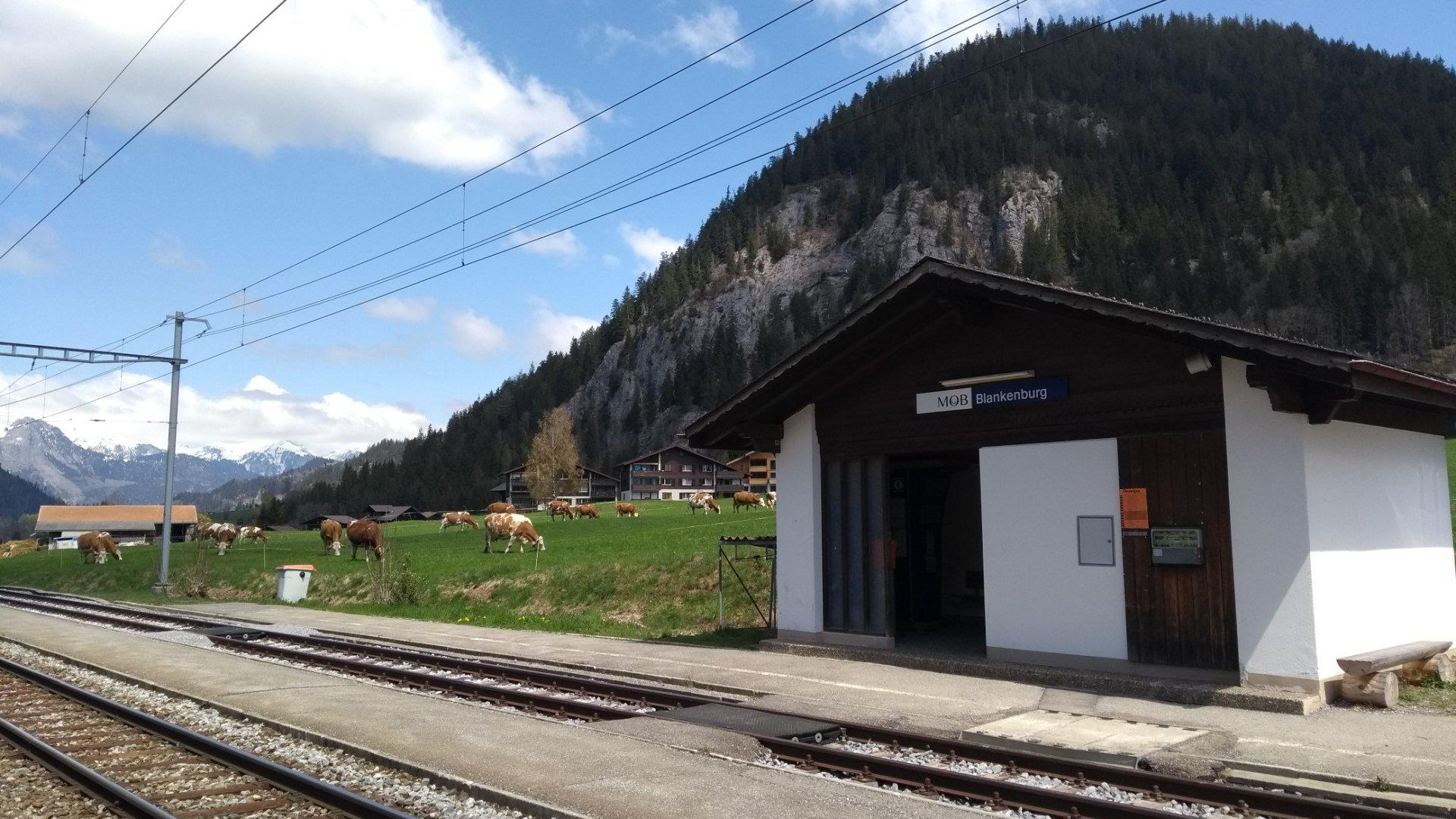
- The station platform in 2019

General information
- Location: Zweisimmen; Switzerland
- Coordinates: 46°32′28″N 7°23′07″E
- Elevation: 957 m (3,140 ft)
- Owner: Montreux Oberland Bernois Railway
- Line: Montreux–Lenk im Simmental line
- Distance: 64.1 km (39.8 mi) from Montreux
- Train operators: Montreux Oberland Bernois Railway

Other information
- Fare zone: 843 (Libero)

Services
Preceding station	Montreux Oberland Bernois Railway	Following station
Zweisimmen Terminus	R31	Stöckli towards Lenk im Simmental
Zweisimmen towards Zweisimmen or Gstaad	R32	Stöckli towards Lenk im Simmental
Location
- Location within Switzerland Location within Canton of Bern

Blankenburg railway station (German: Bahnhof Blankenburg) is a railway station in the municipality of Zweisimmen, in the Swiss canton of Bern. It is an intermediate stop on the 1,000 mm (3 ft 3 3/8 in) Montreux–Lenk im Simmental line of the Montreux Oberland Bernois Railway.

== Services ==
The following services stop at Blankenburg:

- Regio: hourly service between Zweisimmen and Lenk im Simmental.
