= Erlenbach railway station =

Erlenbach railway station may refer to

- Erlenbach ZH railway station, in the Swiss canton of Zurich
- Erlenbach im Simmental railway station, in the Swiss canton of Bern
