= Fontanivent railway station =

Railway station in Montreux, Switzerland

Fontanivent
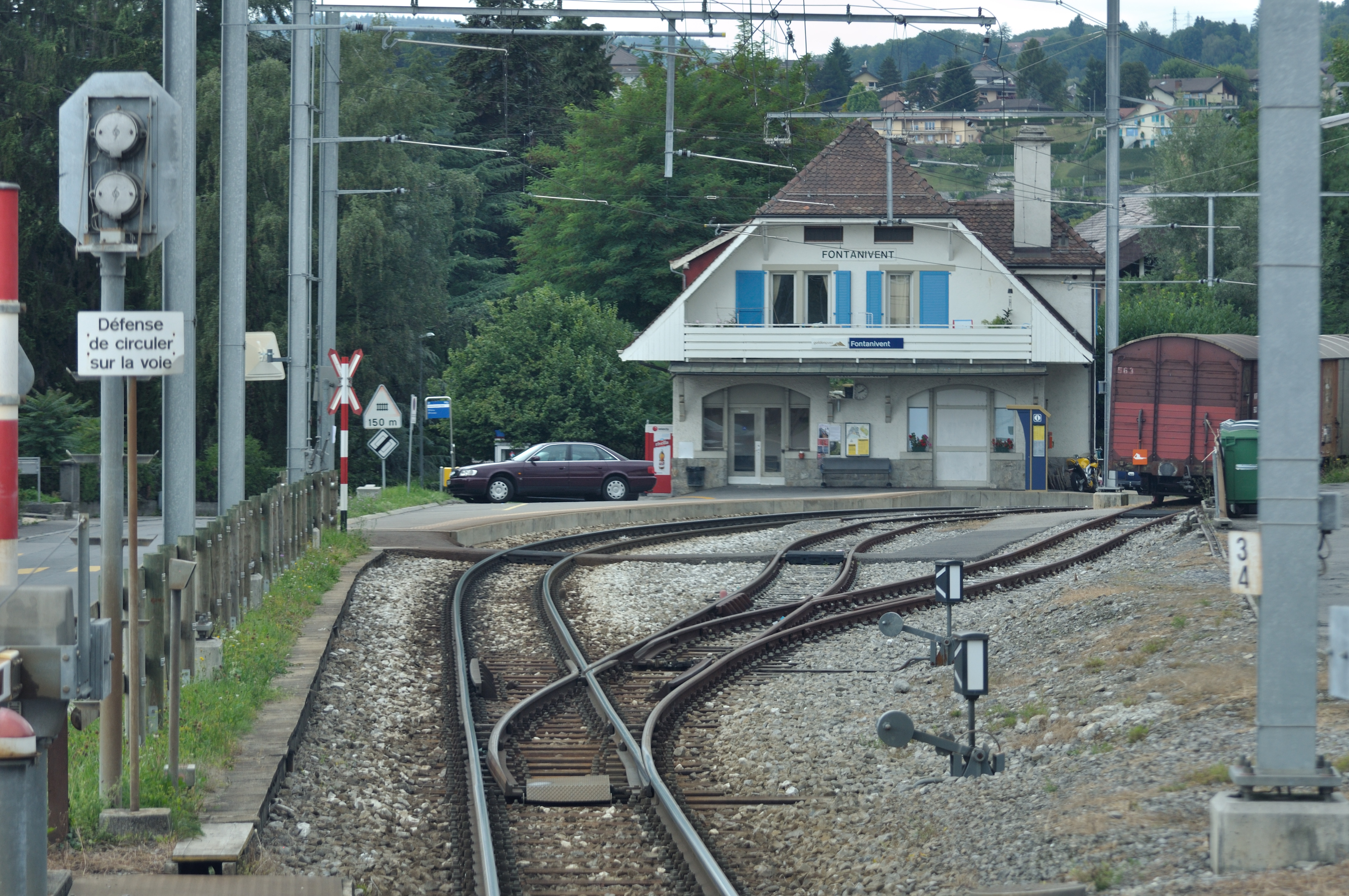
- The station in 2012

General information
- Location: Montreux, Vaud; Switzerland
- Coordinates: 46°27′10″N 6°54′08″E
- Elevation: 555 m (1,821 ft)
- Owner: Montreux Oberland Bernois Railway
- Line: Montreux–Lenk im Simmental line
- Distance: 3.3 km (2.1 mi) from Montreux
- Platforms: 1 side platform
- Tracks: 3
- Train operators: Montreux Oberland Bernois Railway
- Connections: VMCV bus line

Construction
- Accessible: Yes

Other information
- Station code: 8501374 (FON)
- Fare zone: 74 (mobilis)

History
- Opened: 18 December 1901

Passengers
- 2024: 400 per weekday (MOB)

Services
Preceding station	Montreux Oberland Bernois Railway	Following station
Montreux Terminus	PE30	Chernex towards Zweisimmen
Planchamp towards Montreux	R34	Chernex towards Les Avants
Location

Fontanivent railway station (French: Gare de Fontanivent), is a railway station in the municipality of Montreux, in the Swiss canton of Vaud. It is an intermediate stop on the 1,000 mm (3 ft 3 3/8 in) metre gauge Montreux–Lenk im Simmental line of Montreux Oberland Bernois Railway and former station on the Clarens–Chailly–Blonay line.

== History ==
Fontanivent station was opened in 1901, along with the section of the Montreux–Lenk im Simmental line between Montreux and Les Avants. It was originally named Fontanivent-Brent. In 1911, the opening of the Clarens–Chailly–Blonay tramway led to modifications in the station’s track layout and the installation of four semaphore-style signals.

In 1913, the original wooden shelter was replaced by a brick-built station building. In 1949, the semaphore signals were replaced by light signals. Following the closure of the Clarens–Chailly–Blonay line in the previous year, the track toward Clarens was dismantled in 1956, while about 40 meters of the line toward Blonay was retained as a service track.

The station building was rebuilt in 1974, and one of the two level crossings near the station was upgraded with barriers. In 2004, the overhead lines (catenary) between Fontanivent and Chernex were renewed, with the section between Planchamp and Fontanivent undergoing the same update in 2005.

In 2006, the platform was raised to improve accessibility for people with reduced mobility. In 2008, the station building was sold, but the Montreux Oberland Bernois Railway (MOB) continued to use the waiting room and technical areas.

== Services ==
As of the December 2024 timetable change, the following services stop at Fontanivent:

- Regio: hourly service between Montreux and Les Avants or Château-d'Oex.
- Panorama Express: hourly service between Montreux and Zweisimmen.

== Bibliography ==
- Wägli, Hans G.; Jacobi, Sébastien (2010). Schienennetz Schweiz - Bahnprofil Schweiz CH+ [Swiss rail network] (in German) (3rd ed.). Zürich: AS Verlag. ISBN 978-3-909111-74-9.
