= GoldenPass Express =

Railway service in Switzerland

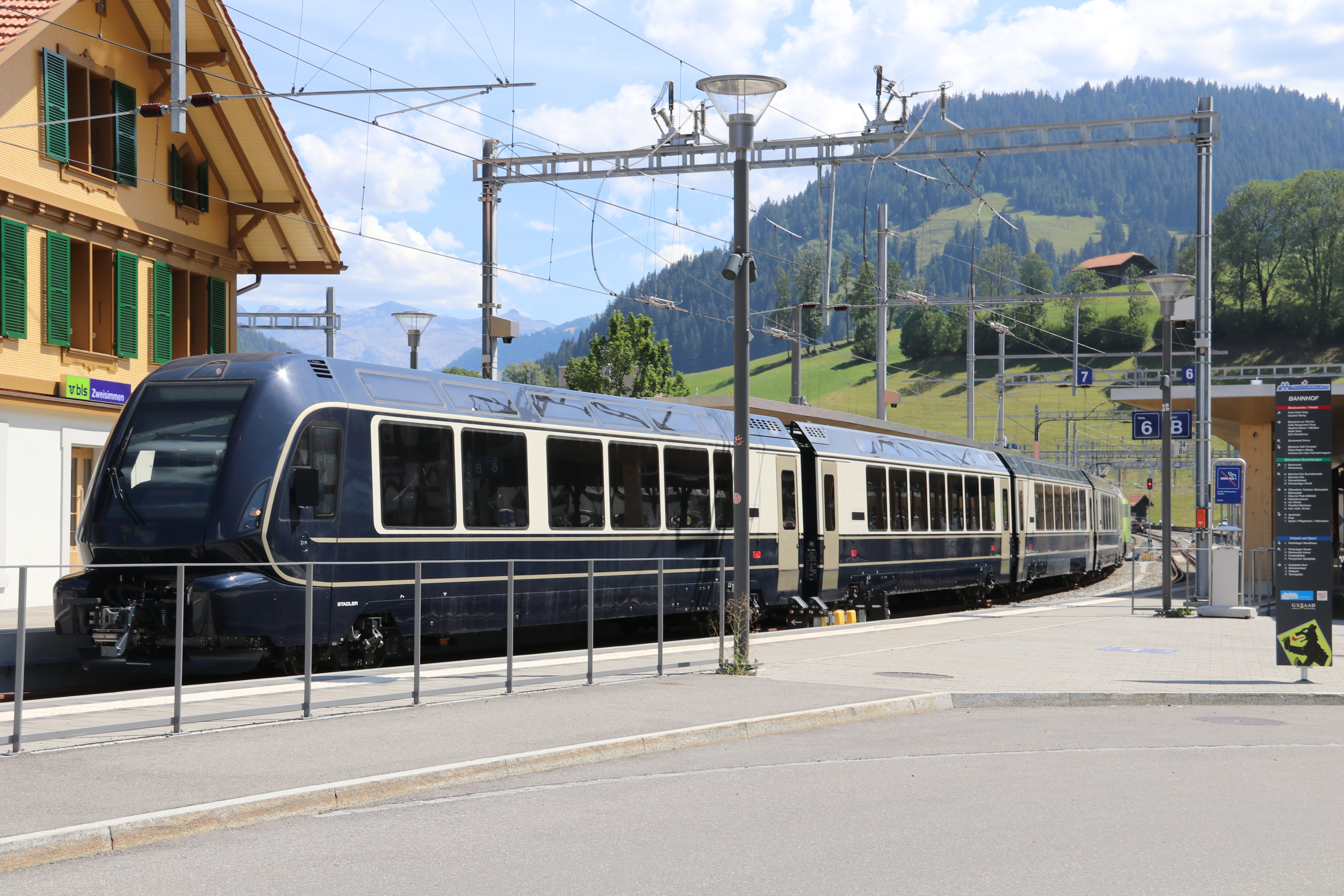
- The GoldenPass Express undergoing testing at Zweisimmen in August 2022

Overview
- Service type: Panorama Express
- First service: 11 December 2022
- Current operators: MOB (Montreaux - Zweisimmen); BLS (Zweisimmen - Interlaken Ost)

Route
- Termini: Montreux; Interlaken Ost
- Stops: 7
- Average journey time: 3 hours 15 minutes
- Service frequency: Daily
- Lines used: Montreux–Lenk im Simmental; Spiez–Zweisimmen; Lake Thun

Technical
- Track owners: Montreux Oberland Bernois Railway; BLS AG

The GoldenPass Express is a railway service that operates as a Panorama Express (PE) train between Montreux, on Lake Geneva, and Interlaken, in the Bernese Oberland, in Switzerland. The train is owned and operated jointly by the Montreux Oberland Bernois Railway (MOB) and BLS AG (BLS). As such, it uses the MOB's 1,000 mm (3 ft 3 3/8 in) gauge line between Montreux and Zweisimmen. In Zweisimmen, the train cars change gauges in order to operate on BLS' 1,435 mm (4 ft 8 1/2 in) gauge lines from Zweisimmen to Spiez and then from Spiez to Interlaken. The automatic gauge changeover, which adjusts both the track gauge and the height of the car body (to account for differences in platform heights), is believed to the first of its kind in the world when implemented on 11 December 2022.

== Route ==
The western terminus of the train is Montreux, on the shore of Lake Geneva in the canton of Vaud. Montreux is the terminus of the Montreux–Lenk im Simmental line's 1,000 mm (3 ft 3 3/8 in) gauge Montreux–Lenk im Simmental line and is shared with the 1,435 mm (4 ft 8 1/2 in) gauge Simplon line of Swiss Federal Railways. The train then climbs into the Bernese Alps, facing a maximum grade of 23‰ before arriving at the first intermediate stop of Montbovon, 22.1 kilometres (13.7 mi) and 48 minutes from Montreux.

From Montbovon the train continues through the Alps, following the course of the river Saane/Sarine to Château-d'Œx and Gstaad, the latter a famous holiday destination. The train encounters a maximum grade of 30‰ as it continues climbing while traveling east. The train continues climbing, rising more than 1,260 metres (4,130 ft) above sea level near Saanenmöser before arriving in Zweisimmen, two hours and four minutes and 62.4 kilometres (38.8 mi) from Montreux.

In Zweisimmen, the train goes through the gauge-changing operation and a locomotive swap, with a BLS AG locomotive handling the train between Zweisimmen and Interlaken Ost. In addition to converting between standard gauge and metre gauge, the platform height rises from 350 millimetres (14 in) to 550 millimetres (22 in).

The BLS line from Zweisimmen to Spiez through the Simmental is comparatively flat, and the train covers the 34.9 kilometres (21.7 mi) to Spiez in 44 minutes. From Spiez, the train uses the Lake Thun railway line, which rounds the southern edge of Lake Thun to Interlaken Ost, where a planned connection with the Zentralbahn's Luzern-Interlaken Express to Lucerne is available.

== History ==
The idea of one railway line connecting the Riviera with the lakes of Thun and Brienz region was broached by the Bernese government in 1873. But local conditions made its implementation complicated. The flat railway line from Interlaken East towards Zweisimmen were suitable for standard gauge, which resulted in the standard-gauge Lake Thun railway line in 1893, extended to Zweisimmen in 1902. On the other hand, the steep profile of the area from Montreux led to MOB choosing the narrow metric gauge. MOB also chose to electrify it from the beginning, which resulted in the metre-gauge Montreux-to-Zweisimmen line with 900 V DC electrification, completed by 1905. By 1916, it was possible to travel by train from Montreux to Lucerne with two changes – one at Zweisimmen and another at Interlaken East – then known as the GoldenPass Line. Eight years later, the GoldenPass Association was founded.

To eliminate the need to change trains at Zweisimmen, in the 1930s MOB explored the idea of adding a third rail from Zweisimmen to Interlaken East (standard gauge track with internal metre-gauge), but abandoned the idea because of major difficulties at the Spiez station. Instead, MOB decided in 2008 to adapt the rolling stock to the break of gauge. The solution was to incorporate variable gauge bogies under the coaches (but not the locomotives, which have different electrification) and install a gauge adjusting ramp at Zweisimmen to change the bogie gauge from metre gauge to standard gauge or vice versa.

The GoldenPass Express, between Montreux and Intelaken East, began operation on 11 December 2022, the date of the timetable change, with a single daily round-trip between Montreux and Interlaken. The two operators MOB and BLS plan to increase the frequency to four round-trips on 11 June 2023. This gradual increase is to match the lower demand caused by the global pandemic.

From 20 March 2023 onwards, The GoldenPass Express was limited to the meter-gauge section of the line between Zweisimmen and Montreux, due to increased wear on standard-gauge tracks caused by the variable gauge rolling stock. The issue was later resolved by reducing the standard-gauge wheel spacing by a few millimetres, and through running services resumed on 11 June 2023 with one daily round trip. The service was set to expand to four daily round trips until end of July 2023 as more rolling stock was modified.

== See also ==
- Bernina Express
- Glacier Express
- Gotthard Panorama Express
- List of named passenger trains of Switzerland
- Rail transport in Switzerland
