= Spiez railway station =

Railway station in Spiez, Switzerland

Spiez
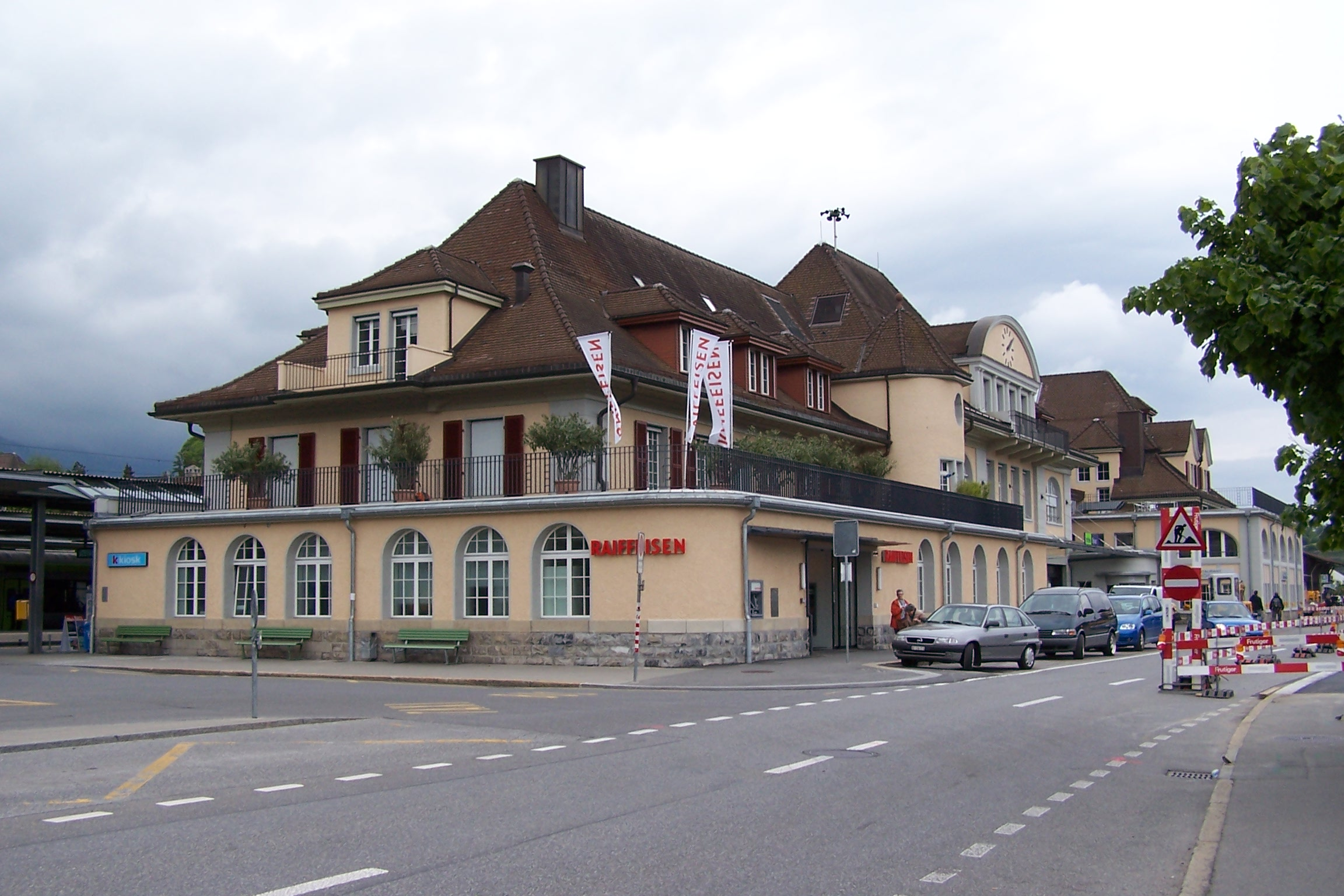
- The station building in 2013

General information
- Location: Spiez; Switzerland
- Coordinates: 46°41′10″N 7°40′48″E
- Elevation: 628 m (2,060 ft)
- Owner: BLS AG
- Lines: Lake Thun line; Lötschberg lines; Spiez–Zweisimmen line
- Distance: 9.8 km (6.1 mi) from Thun
- Platforms: 5: 2 island platforms; 1 side platform
- Tracks: 10
- Train operators: BLS AG; Deutsche Bahn; Swiss Federal Railways
- Connections: PostAuto AG buses; STI Bus AG bus line

Construction
- Parking: Yes (198 spaces)
- Accessible: Yes

Other information
- Station code: 8507483 (SP)
- Fare zone: 720 (Libero)

Passengers
- 2025: 18,600 per day (BLS, SBB)
- Rank: 42 out of 1,095 (Note: Tied with Wädenswil railway station.)
Services
Preceding station	BLS	Following station
Thun towards Bern	RE1	Mülenen towards Brig or Domodossola
Thun towards Bern	RE1	through to R11
Wimmis towards Zweisimmen	RE8	Terminus
Terminus	RE9	Interlaken West towards Interlaken Ost
Thun towards Biel/Bienne	RE11 Weekends only	Mülenen towards Brig
through to RE1	R11	Reverses direction
Lattigen bei Spiez towards Zweisimmen	R11	Reverses direction
Terminus	R12	Mülenen towards Frutigen
Wimmis towards Montreux	GoldenPass Express	Interlaken West towards Interlaken Ost
Preceding station	DB Fernverkehr	Following station
Thun towards Berlin Ostbahnhof	ICE 12	Interlaken West towards Interlaken Ost
Thun towards Berlin Ostbahnhof	ICE 12	Visp towards Brig
Preceding station	SBB CFF FFS	Following station
Thun towards Hamburg-Altona	EuroCity	Interlaken West towards Interlaken Ost
Thun towards Basel SBB	EuroCity	Visp towards Milano Centrale
Thun towards Basel SBB	IC 6	Visp towards Brig
Thun towards Romanshorn	IC 8	Visp towards Brig
Thun towards Basel SBB	IC 61	Interlaken West towards Interlaken Ost
Thun towards Romanshorn	IC 81	Interlaken West towards Interlaken Ost
Location

Spiez is a railway station in the town of Spiez, in the Swiss canton of Bern. It is on the Thunersee line of the BLS AG, which connects Thun and Interlaken, and is the junction for the same company's busy Lötschberg line, as well as the Spiez-Erlenbach-Zweisimmen line.

The station is served by various operators, including the BLS, Swiss Federal Railways, Deutsche Bahn.

== Services ==
As of the December 2024 timetable change, the following services stop at Spiez:

- EuroCity / InterCity / Intercity Express (ICE): hourly or better service between Basel SBB and Interlaken Ost. Most northbound trains terminate in Basel; a single EuroCity and an ICE continue to Hamburg-Altona and two ICE continue to Berlin Ostbahnhof.
- EuroCity: four trains per day between Basel SBB and Milano Centrale.
- InterCity: service every hour between Romanshorn and Brig.
- GoldenPass Express: 4 daily round-trips between Montreux and Interlaken Ost.
- RegioExpress / Regio: half-hourly or hourly service to Zweisimmen; hourly service to Bern and Brig or Domodossola; daily service on weekends during the high season to Biel/Bienne and Brig; rush hour service to Frutigen; service every two hours to Interlaken Ost.

== See also ==
- Rail transport in Switzerland
