= Montreux railway station =

Railway station in Montreux, Switzerland

Montreux
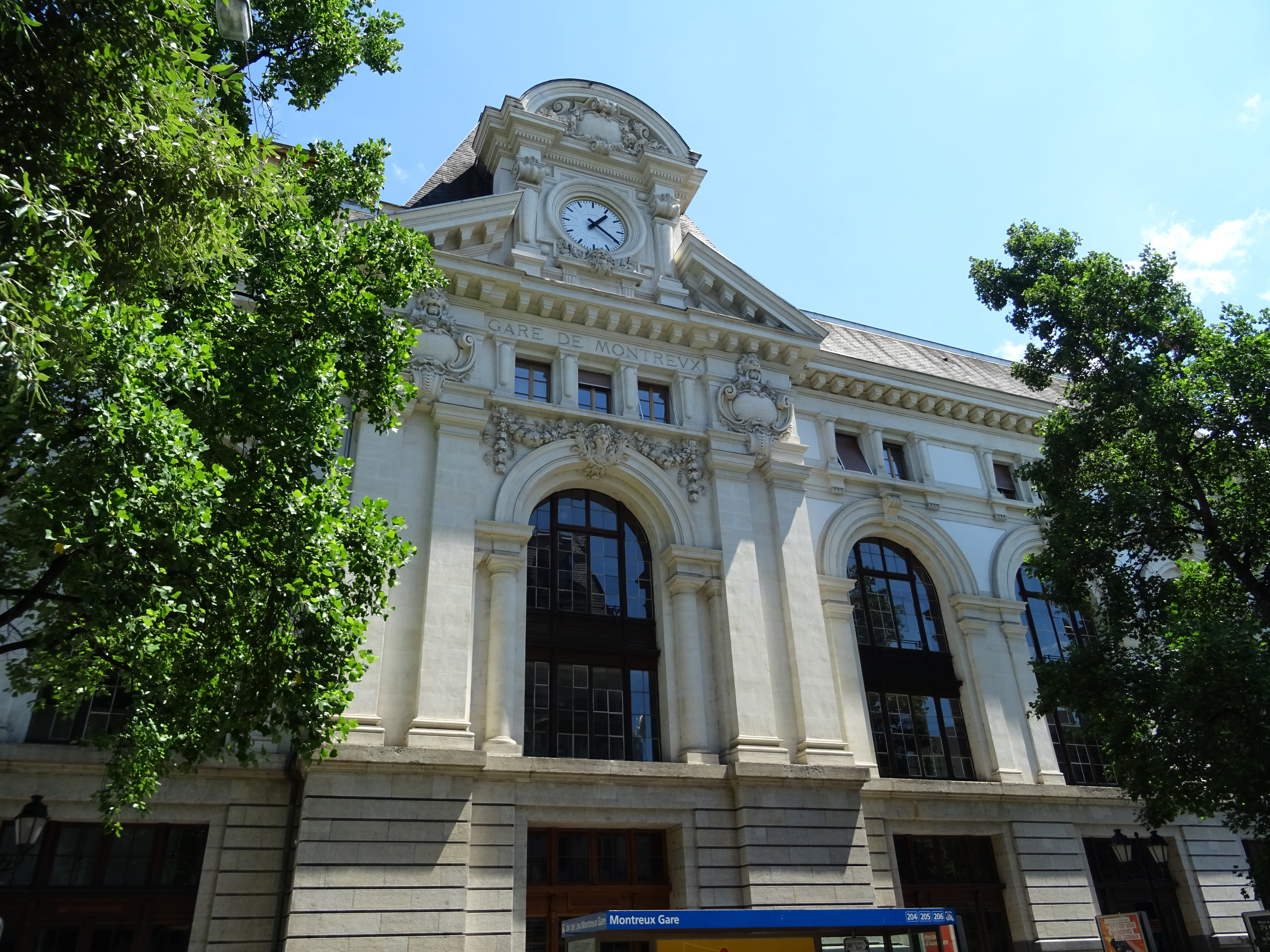
- The station building in 2020

General information
- Location: Avenue des Alpes 74; Montreux; Switzerland
- Coordinates: 46°26′09″N 6°54′38″E
- Elevation: 395 m (1,296 ft)
- Owner: Swiss Federal Railways
- Lines: Montreux–Glion–Rochers-de-Naye line; Montreux–Lenk im Simmental line; Simplon line
- Distance: 24.5 km (15.2 mi) from Lausanne
- Platforms: 7
- Tracks: 8
- Train operators: Montreux Oberland Bernois Railway; Swiss Federal Railways; Transports Montreux–Vevey–Riviera
- Connections: VMCV buses; trolleybuses

Construction
- Parking: Yes (281 spaces)
- Cycle facilities: Yes (62 spaces)
- Accessible: Yes

Other information
- Station code: 8501300 (MX)
- IATA code: ZJP
- Fare zone: 73 (mobilis)
- Website: SBB website

History
- Opened: 1861

Passengers
- 2025: 19,500 per day (MOB, SBB)
- Rank: 38 out of 1,095

Services
Preceding station	SBB CFF FFS	Following station
Vevey towards Geneva Airport	IR 90	Aigle towards Brig
Vevey towards Geneva Airport	IR 95	Aigle towards Brig
Vevey towards Annemasse or Geneva Airport	RE33	Villeneuve VD towards St-Maurice or Martigny
Vevey towards Annemasse or Geneva Airport	RE33	Veytaux-Chillon towards St-Maurice or Martigny
Clarens towards Lausanne	RegioExpress Limited service	Villeneuve VD towards St-Maurice
Preceding station	RER Vaud	Following station
Clarens towards Vallorbe	R3	Villeneuve VD towards Vevey
Clarens towards Le Brassus or Vallorbe	R4	Territet towards Vevey
Preceding station	Montreux Oberland Bernois Railway	Following station
Terminus	GoldenPass Express	Montbovon towards Interlaken Ost
Terminus	PE30	Fontanivent towards Zweisimmen
Terminus	R34	Montreux-Collège towards Les Avants or Château-d'Oex
Preceding station	Transports Montreux–Vevey–Riviera	Following station
Terminus	R37	Montreux-Les Planches towards Rochers-de-Naye
Location
- Location within Switzerland Location within Canton of Vaud

Montreux railway station (French: Gare de Montreux) is the largest of the railway stations serving the municipality of Montreux, in the canton of Vaud, Switzerland.

All of the SBB-CFF-FFS standard gauge passenger trains operating on the Simplon line call at this station, which is also the western terminus of the GoldenPass Line narrow gauge railway lines to Zweisimmen and to Rochers de Naye.

== History ==
Montreux railway station was opened in 1861, when the then Jura–Simplon Railway (JS) opened the Lausanne–Villeneuve section of its standard gauge Simplon railway line to Sion. This line is now owned and operated by SBB-CFF-FFS.

In 1901, the station became a junction station upon the opening of the first section of the metre gauge Montreux–Lenk im Simmental line, between Montreux and its higher-altitude suburb of Les Avants. In 1903, the MOB was extended to Montbovon.

In 1909, the Chemin de fer Montreux–Glion opened the Montreux–Glion section of the Montreux–Glion–Rochers-de-Naye railway line rack railway was opened, as an extension of the original 800 mm (2 ft 7 1/2 in) line of Chemin de fer Glion–Rochers-de-Naye, opened in 1892. It is now operated by Transports Montreux–Vevey–Riviera.

== Location ==
The station is on a hillside above the lake.

Access to and from Montreux's main street, Grand Rue, is by escalators, elevators and stairs. The Rue de la Gare provides access to and from the old town, which is divided from the lake shore by the standard gauge railway tracks.

== Layout ==
The station complex is in many ways a rarity. Montreux is most distinctive for being one of the few stations in the world (and the only station in Switzerland) served by three different track gauges: SBB-CFF-FFS 1,435 mm (4 ft 8 1/2 in), MOB 1,000 mm (3 ft 3 3/8 in) and MVR 800 mm (2 ft 7 1/2 in). Its having three gauges is something shared by Gare de Latour-de-Carol-Enveitg in the French Pyrénées.

Second, access from the station building to the railway platforms is from the second floor, not the ground floor, due to the slope of the city, while the service facilities are at ground floor level, and access to the underpass can be found on the first floor.

Apart from these unusual features, the station also lacks a track 2. In the past, the designation track 2 was allocated to a passing loop not equipped with a platform. However, in 2006, as part of work done to increase the height of the platforms to 55 centimetres (22 in), this track was provided with a platform and renamed track 1, and the former platform 1 was removed.

The SBB-CFF-FFS serves the main platform with track 1, and also operates track 3, which, together with the MOB tracks 4 (east half) and 5 (western half), serves a centre platform. Track 4 partially divides that platform in two.

Tracks 6, 7 and 8 serve a further central platform, which is similarly partially divided in two by track 7. Track 8, operated by the MVR, is situated underneath both a hotel and the MOB/MVR headquarters, known as the GoldenPass Centre.

Whereas tracks 4 and 7 are used by regional traffic to and from Fontanivent, Sonzier and Les Avants, tracks 5 and 6 are for trains to and from Zweisimmen.

== Services ==
As of the December 2024 timetable change, the following services call at Montreux:

=== Swiss Federal Railways ===
- InterRegio: half-hourly service between Geneva Airport and Brig.
- RegioExpress:
  - half-hourly service (hourly on weekends) between Annemasse and St-Maurice, and hourly service from St-Maurice to Martigny. On weekends, hourly service to Geneva Airport.
  - two round-trips in each direction between Lausanne and St-Maurice.

=== RER Vaud ===
- RER Vaud R3 / R4: half-hourly (hourly on weekends) service between Vallorbe and Bex; hourly service to Le Brassus; limited service from Bex to St-Maurice.

=== Montreux–Lenk im Simmental line ===
- GoldenPass Express: four round-trips to Interlaken Ost via Zweisimmen.
- Panorama Express / Regio: half-hourly service to Les Avants or Château-d'Oex and hourly service to Zweisimmen.

=== Transports Montreux–Vevey–Riviera ===
- Regio: hourly service to Rochers-de-Naye.

== Bus traffic ==
A total of three VMCV bus stops serve the station:

- Vernex-Dessus on motor bus lines 4,5 and 6;
- Montreux Gare on motor bus lines 4,5 and 6;
- Escalier de la Gare on trolleybus line 1, access via escalators to Grand Boulevard.

== See also ==
- Montreux
- SBB-CFF-FFS
- Montreux-Oberland Bernois
- Montreux–Lenk im Simmental line
- Transports Montreux–Vevey–Riviera
- Rail transport in Switzerland
