= Zweisimmen railway station =

Railway station in Zweisimmen, Switzerland

Zweisimmen
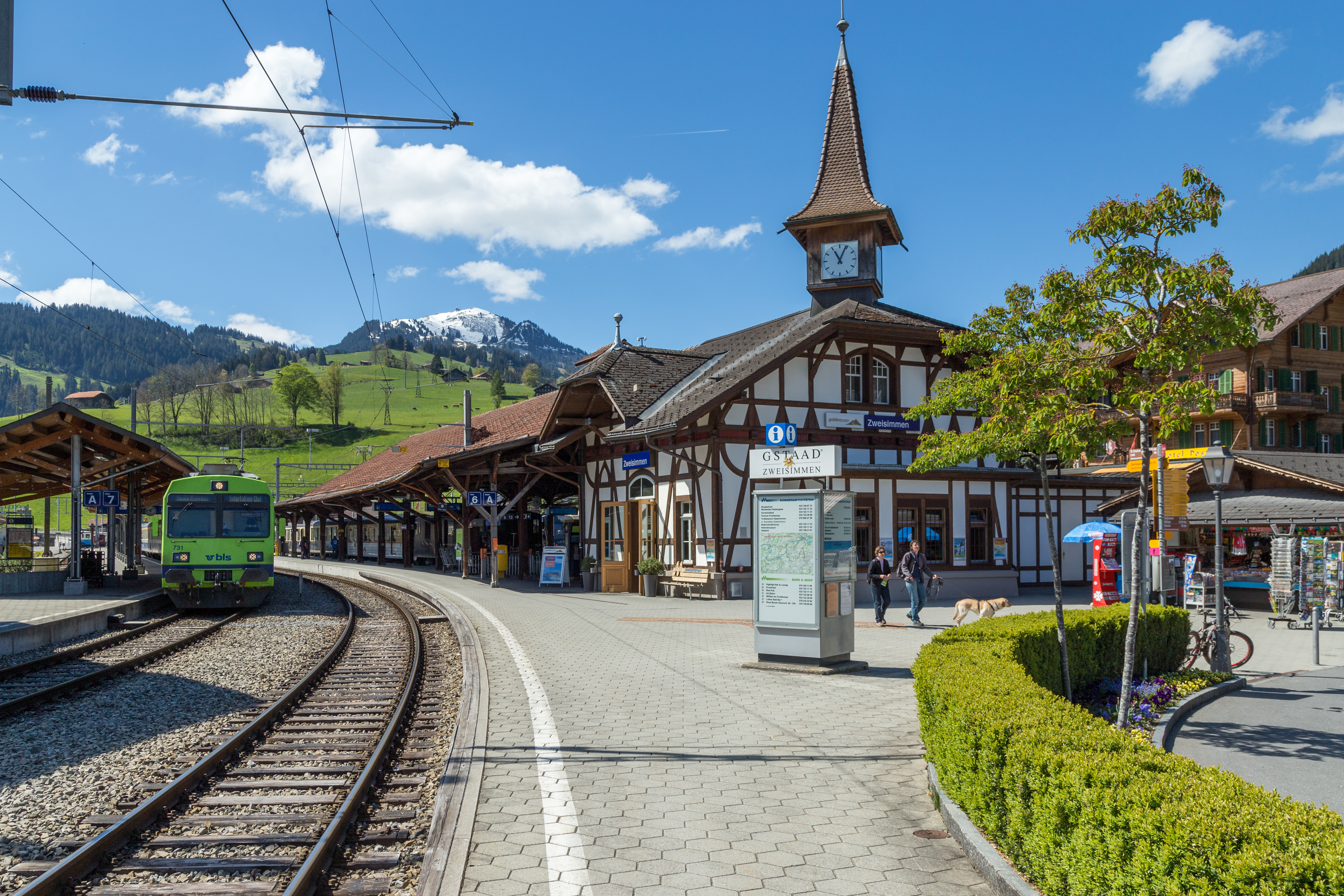
- The station building in 2014

General information
- Location: Zweisimmen; Switzerland
- Coordinates: 46°33′13″N 7°22′30″E
- Elevation: 941 m (3,087 ft)
- Owner: BLS AG; Montreux Oberland Bernois Railway
- Lines: Montreux–Lenk im Simmental line; Spiez–Zweisimmen line
- Distance: 34.9 km (21.7 mi) from Spiez; 62.4 km (38.8 mi) from Montreux
- Platforms: 3 island platforms; 1 side platform
- Tracks: 7
- Train operators: BLS AG; Montreux Oberland Bernois Railway
- Connections: PostAuto AG buses

Construction
- Parking: Yes (51 spaces)
- Accessible: Yes

Other information
- Station code: 8507290 (ZW)
- Fare zone: 843 (Libero)

Passengers
- 2023: 4'600 per weekday (BLS, MOB)

Services
Preceding station	BLS	Following station
Terminus	RE8	Boltigen towards Spiez
Terminus	R11	Boltigen towards Bern
Terminus	R11 Limited service	Grubenwald towards Spiez
Preceding station	Montreux Oberland Bernois Railway	Following station
Saanenmöser towards Montreux	GoldenPass Express	Boltigen towards Interlaken Ost
Oeschseite towards Montreux	PE30	Terminus
Terminus	R31	Blankenburg towards Lenk im Simmental
Saanenmöser towards Gstaad	R32	Blankenburg towards Lenk im Simmental
Location

Zweisimmen railway station (German: Bahnhof Zweisimmen) is a railway station in the municipality of Zweisimmen, in the Swiss canton of Bern. It is the terminus of the standard gauge Spiez–Zweisimmen line (from north) and of the 1,000 mm (3 ft 3 3/8 in) Montreux–Zweisimmen and Zweisimmen–Lenk im Simmental lines (separately from south, Montreux–Lenk im Simmental line). The station is across the street from the valley station of the gondola to the top of the Rinderberg.

== Layout ==
Zweisimmen has three island platforms and one side platform. The westernmost platform is an island platform serving tracks 3 and 4. These are metre gauge tracks serving the Montreux–Lenk im Simmental line and terminate at the station. The next platform east is another island platform. On the west side is track 5, also a metre gauge track that terminates at the station. On the east side is track 6, one of two dual gauge through tracks that connects the Montreux–Zweisimmen railway line with the Spiez–Zweisimmen railway. Next to that platform is the third island platform, serving tracks 7 and 8. Track 7, like 6, is a dual-gauge track, and each track has installed a gauge adjusting ramp for the GoldenPass Express. Track 8 is a metre gauge track serving trains to Lenk im Simmental over the Montreux–Lenk im Simmental line and terminates at the station. Finally, on the east side of the station is a side platform serving track 12. Track 12 connects with the Spiez–Zweisimmen railway line and terminates at the station.

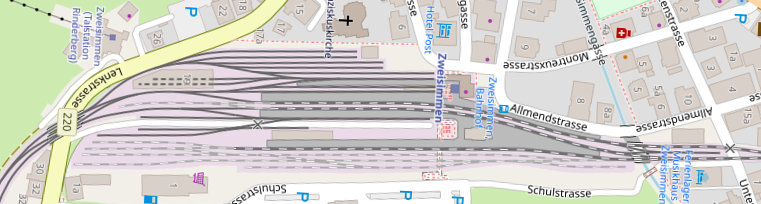
The track layout at Zweisimmen; tracks to the right lead to Spiez

In 2016, bogie exchange facilities were installed to allow rolling stock to be transferred between the two systems.

== Services ==
The following services stop at Zweisimmen:

- GoldenPass Express: 4 daily round-trips between Montreux and Interlaken Ost with Gauge Change at Zweisimmen.
- Panorama Express/Regio: hourly or better service to Montreux.
- RegioExpress: irregular service to Spiez.
- Regio:
  - hourly service to Bern.
  - hourly or better service to Lenk im Simmental.
  - rush-hour service to Gstaad.

== Gallery ==
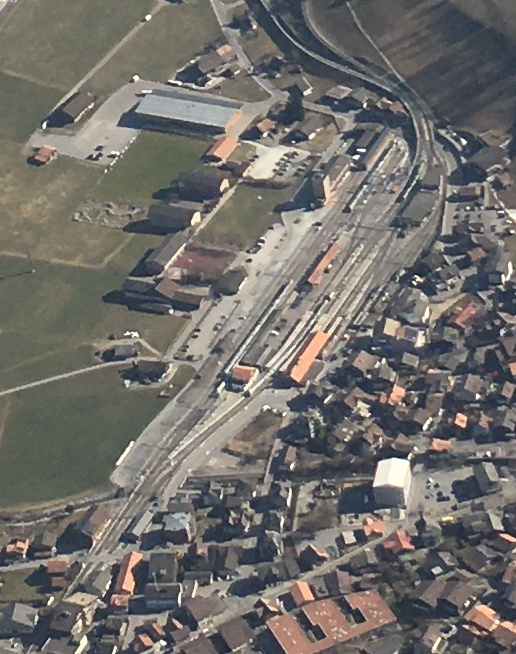
Aerial view (2022)

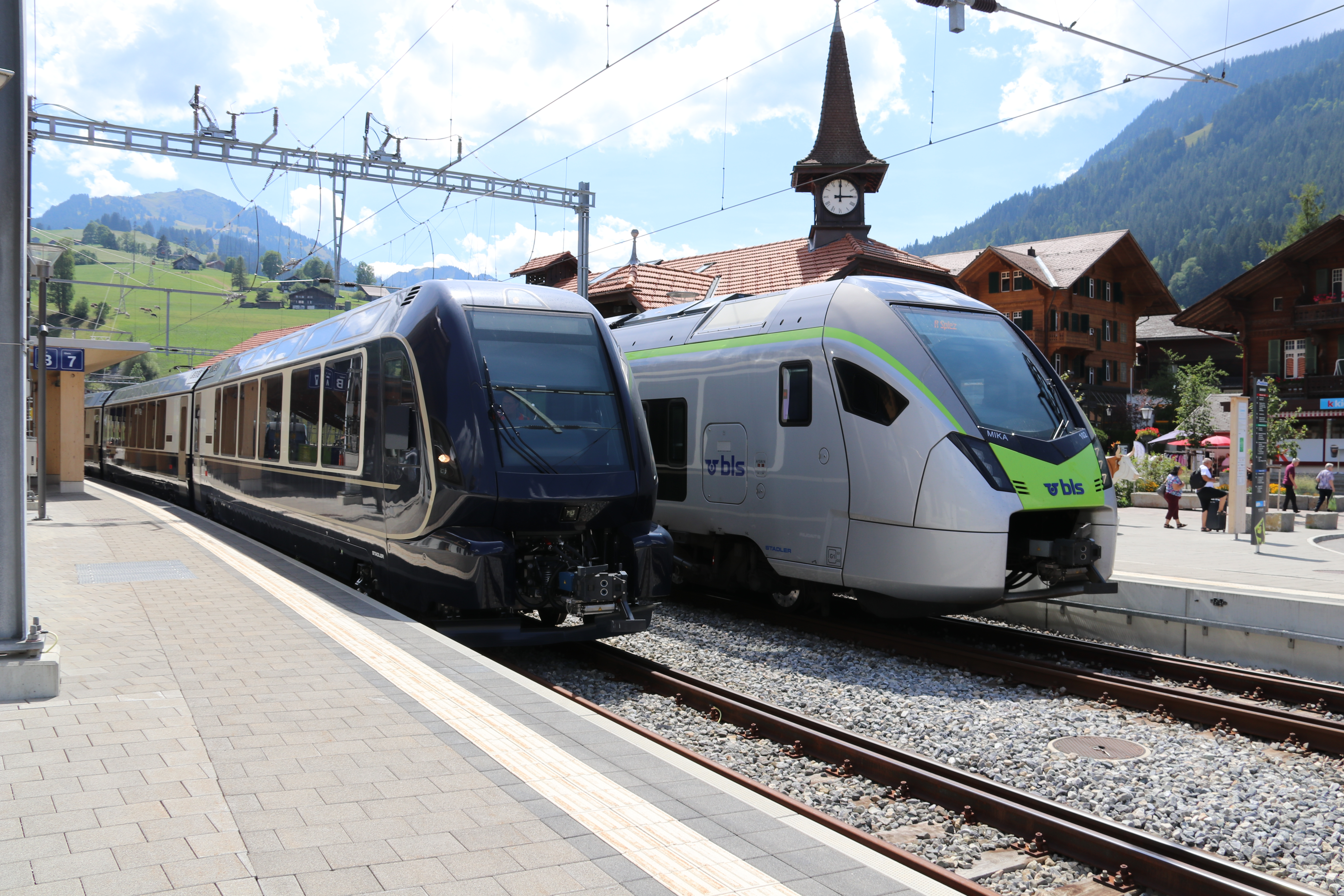
MOB (1000mm) and BLS (1435mm) (2022)

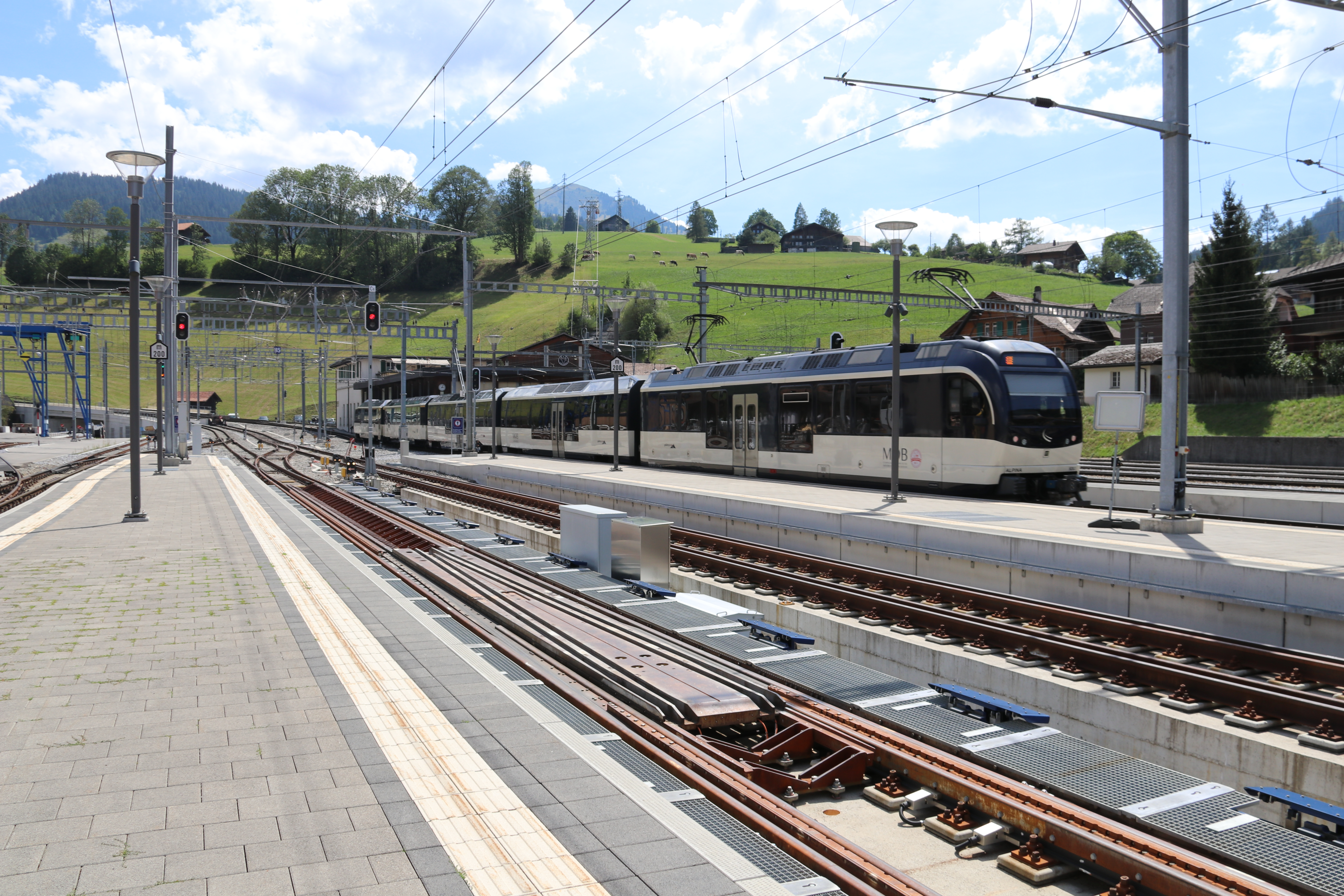
Dual gauge track and gauge adjusting ramp (2022)

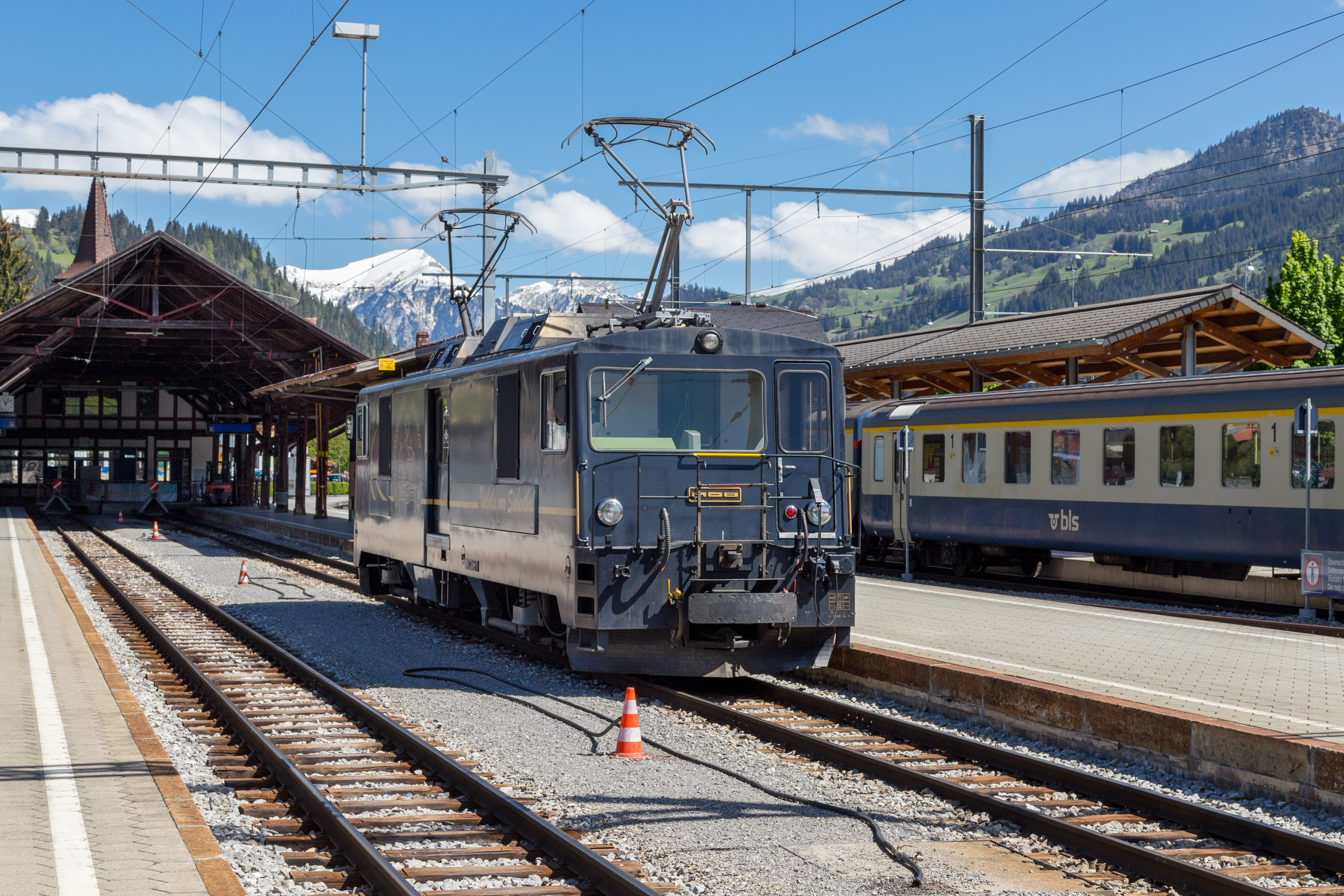
Train shed (2014)

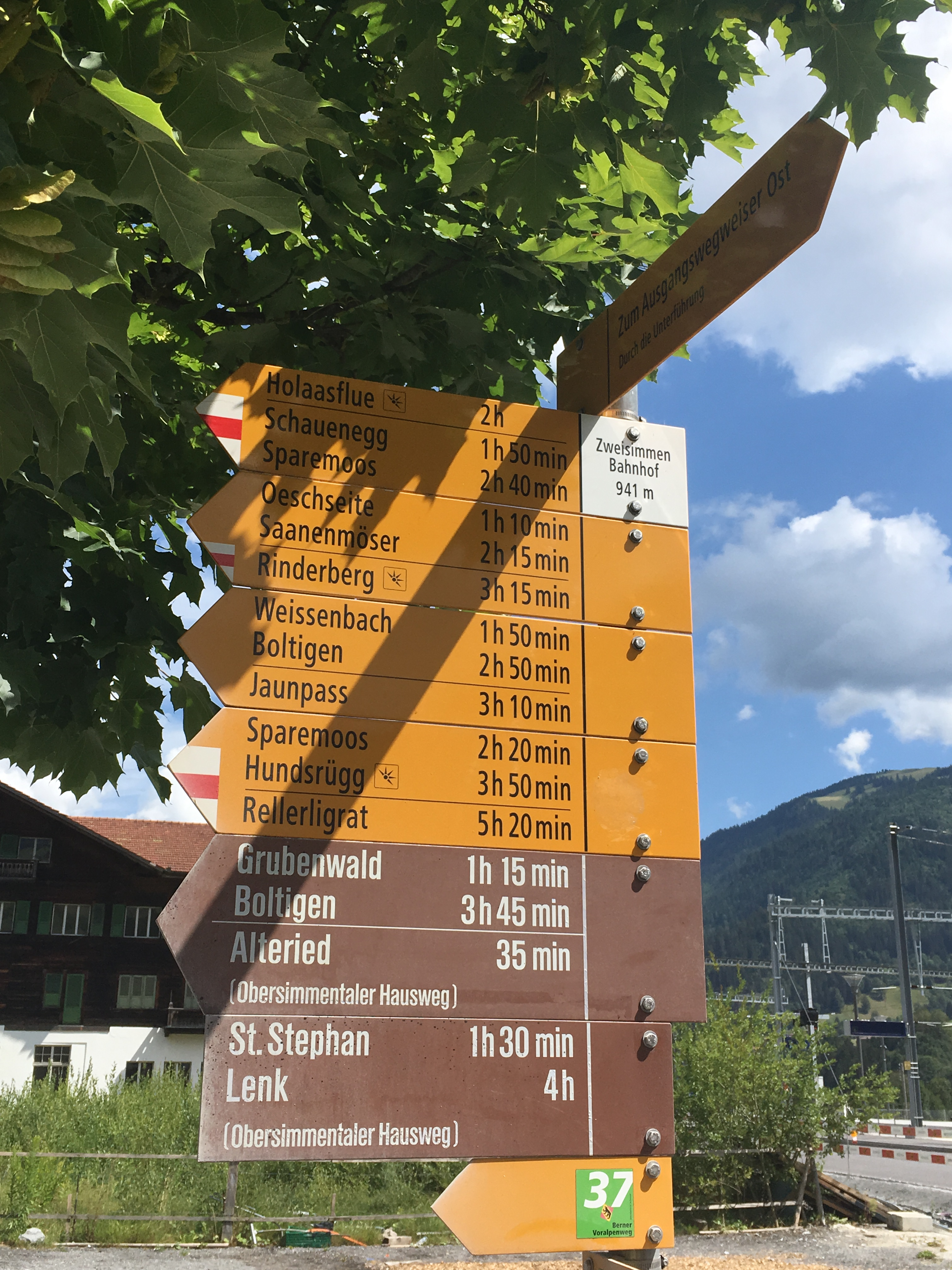
Hiking destinations (2018)

== See also ==
- Rail transport in Switzerland
