= Spiez–Zweisimmen railway =

Single-track standard-gauge line in Switzerland

Spiez-Zweisimmen railway
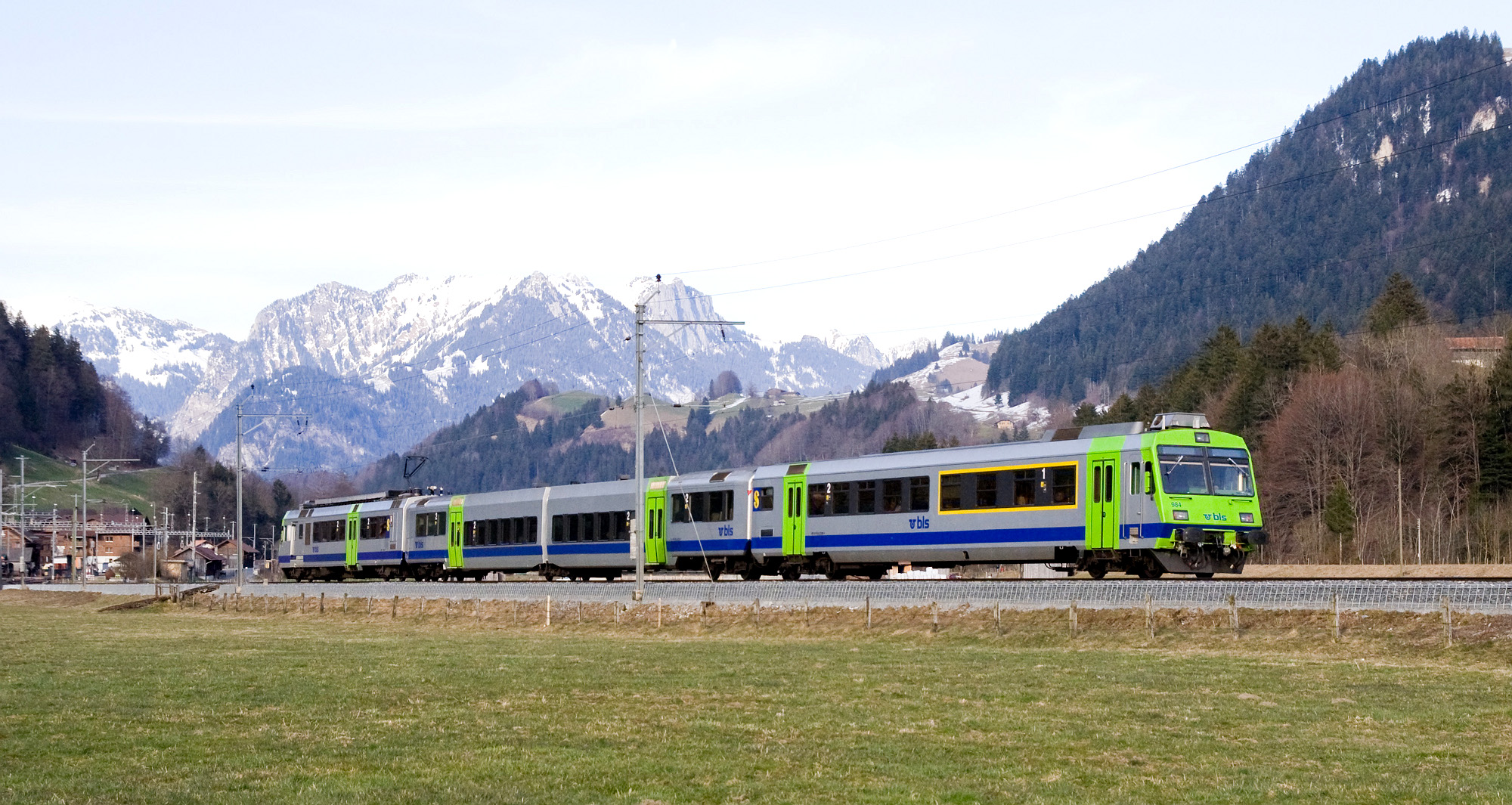
- RBDe 565 push-pull train with Jumbo intermediate coach between Boltigen and Weissenbach

Overview
- Owner: BLS
- Line number: 320
- Termini: Spiez; Zweisimmen

Technical
- Line length: 34.90 km (21.69 mi)
- Number of tracks: 1
- Track gauge: 1,435 mm (4 ft 8 1/2 in)
- Electrification: 15 kV 16.7 Hz AC overhead catenary
- Maximum incline: 2.5%

The Spiez–Zweisimmen railway is a single-track standard-gauge line in Switzerland that is currently operated by BLS AG. It was formerly owned by the Spiez-Erlenbach-Zweisimmen-Bahn (SEZ), also called the Simmentalbahn (Simme Valley Railway). The line runs from Spiez through the Simmental to Zweisimmen. It is marketed as part of the GoldenPass Line between Lucerne and Montreux, which also includes the metre-gauge Brünig Railway and Montreux–Lenk im Simmental line and part of the standard-gauge Lake Thun Railway.

The SEZ was formed on 1 January 1942 from the merger of the Spiez-Erlenbach-Bahn (SEB), which opened the line from Spiez to Erlenbach on 16 August 1897, and the Erlenbach-Zweisimmen-Bahn (EZB), which opened the line from Erlenbach to Zweisimmen on 31 October 1902.

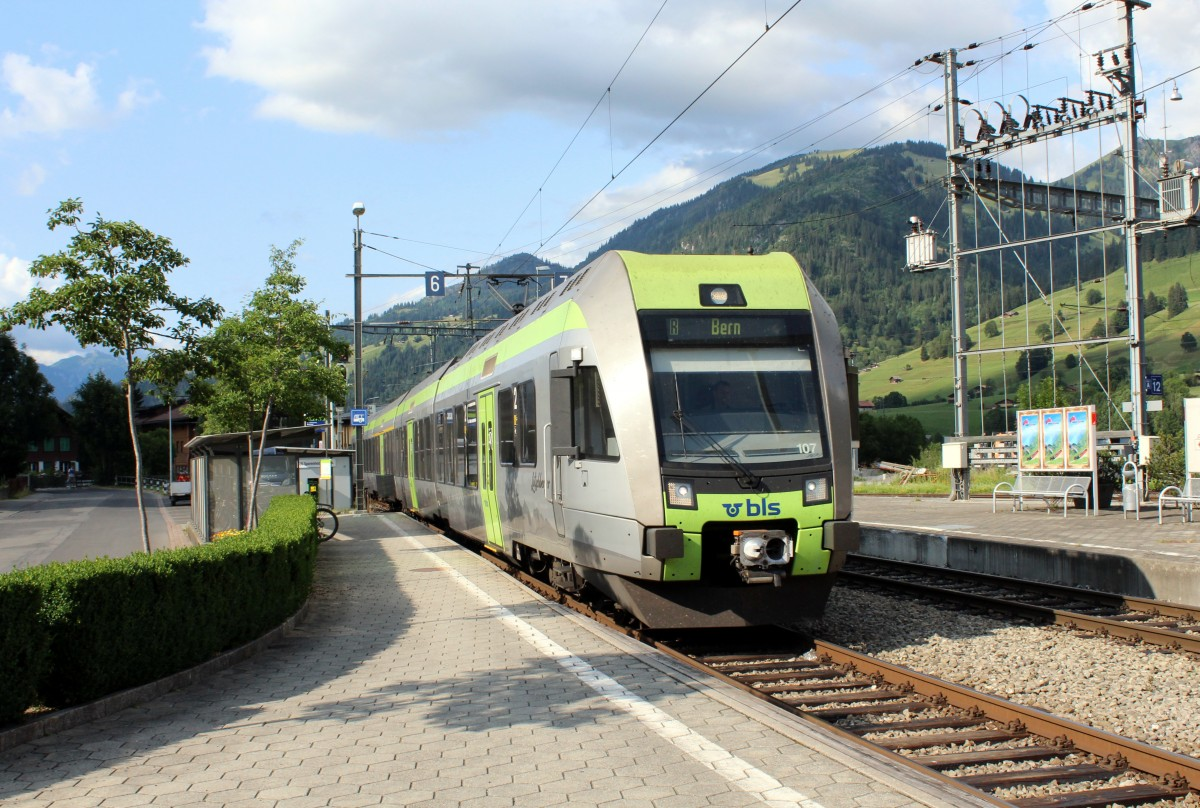
RABe 535 Lötschberger in Zweisimmen station.

In June 1997, the SEZ merged with the Gürbetal-Bern-Schwarzenburg-Bahn (GBS), the Bern-Neuenburg-Bahn (BN) and the Berner Alpenbahn-Gesellschaft Bern–Lötschberg–Simplon (BLS) to form the BLS Lötschbergbahn, which itself merged with the Regionalverkehr Mittelland to form the BLS AG in 2006.

In Zweisimmen there is a connection to the narrow-gauge Montreux–Lenk im Simmental line of the Montreux Oberland Bernois Railway (MOB), which runs from Lake Geneva to Lenk im Simmental. Local services operate hourly over the line. Regional Express services operate every two hours.

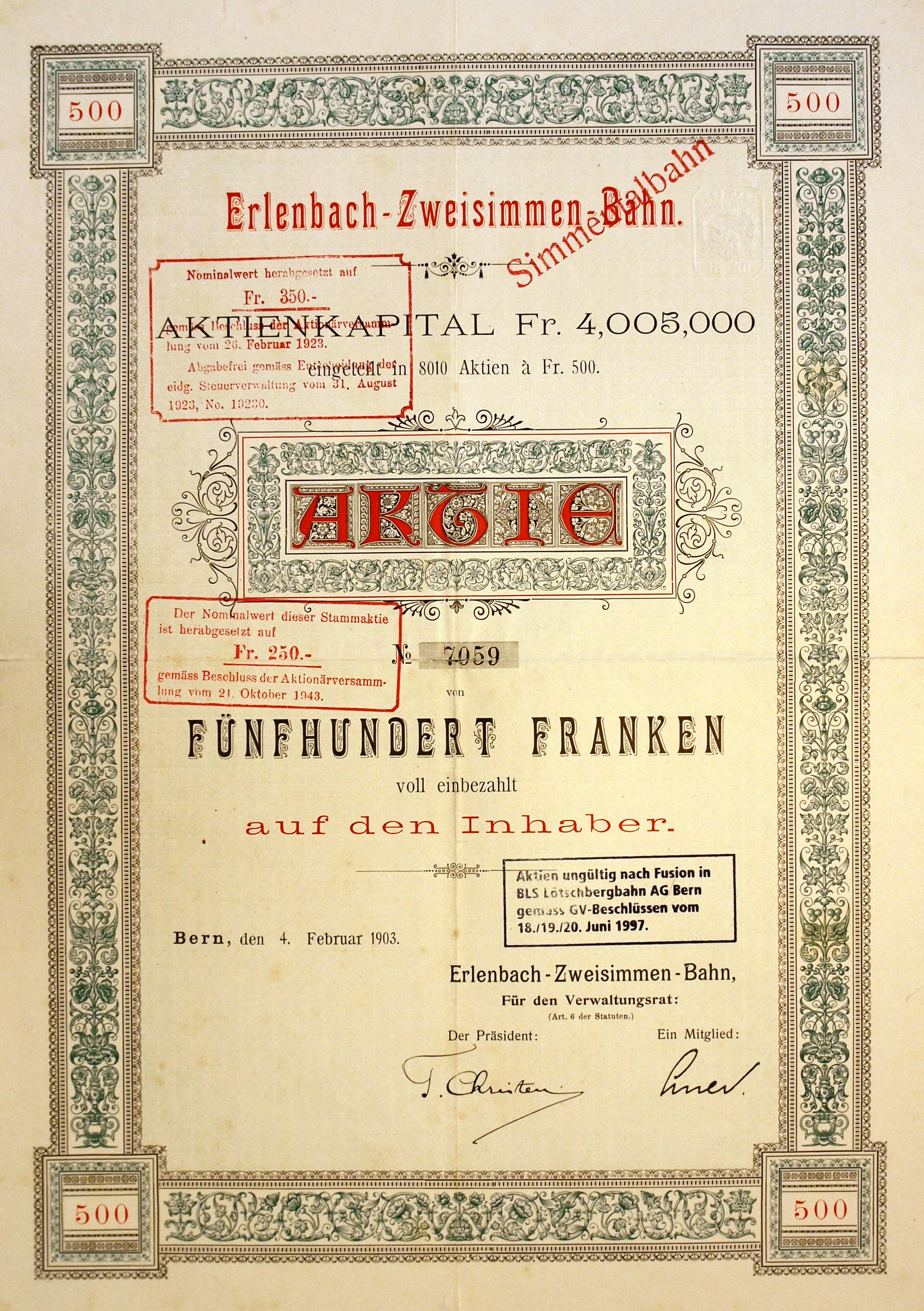
500 franc share certificate of the Erlenbach-Zweisimmen-Bahn issued on 4 February 1903
