= Kocher (disambiguation) =

The Kocher is a river in Germany.

Kocher may also refer to:

- Kocher (surname)
- Kocher (crater), lunar impact crater

== Medicine ==
Named after Emil Theodor Kocher:

- Kocher manoeuvre, a surgical manoeuvre
- Kocher-Debre-Semelaigne syndrome
- Kocher's point, a common location for insertion of an extraventricular drain
- Kocher approach to the elbow
- Kocher incision
- Kocher's forceps
