= Healer of Berne =

The case of the Healer of Berne (German Heiler von Bern) involves an Italian-Swiss music teacher and owner of an acupuncture practice which operated without a license. He is accused of knowingly infecting at least 16 people with the HIV virus, and 14 of them were also infected with Hepatitis C.

The acts were carried from 2001 to 2005 in the Swiss capital, Bern. A manager who in 2004 was jabbed in his back during the acupuncture treatment and subsequently was tested positive for the HIV virus set the medical investigation into motion. His clues were only followed up in a criminal investigation after several other patients accumulated at Bern's main hospital, the Inselspital, who also were infected with the same strain of the virus. The blood used for infecting the victim was, over the course of several years, drawn from a man who was promised a potential cure for his HIV infection. According to the criminal charges, two former girlfriends of the acupuncture therapist were also infected by him.

The trial at the regional court Bern-Mittelland began on March 6, 2013. The accused denied any involvement in the infections. When the trial opened, he hid for 24 hours in his home instead of arriving at the court, making a SWAT team necessary for apprehending him. On March 13, he was sentenced to 12 years and 9 months of prison for serious bodily injury.

He appealed to the Obergericht of the Canton of Bern, as did the prosecutor. It then raised the sentence to the maximum allowed for bodily injury, namely 15 years of prison. Again, an appeal was made to the Federal Supreme Court of Switzerland, which confirmed the 15 years of prison in its ruling (decision 141 IV 97), and rejected the plea to be acquitted for serious bodily injury, and instead be tried for minor bodily injury as well as proliferation of human diseases.
