= St. Stephan, Switzerland =

St. Stephan
- Municipality
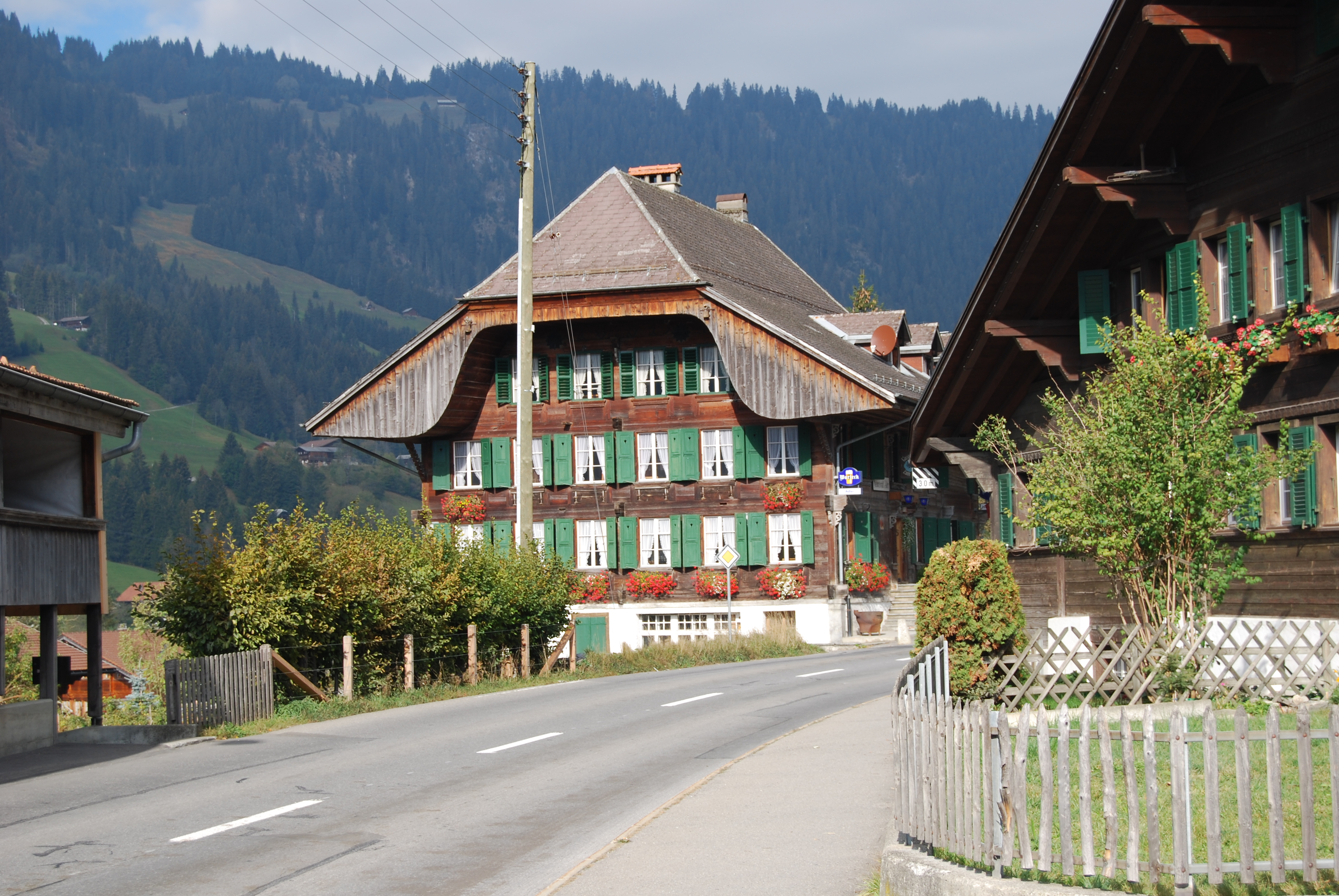
- St. Stephan village

- Flag Coat of arms
- Location of St. Stephan
- Location within Switzerland Location within Canton of Bern
- Coordinates: 46°30′N 7°23′E
- Country: Switzerland
- Canton: Bern
- District: Obersimmental-Saanen

Government
  - Mayor: Hans Grünenwald

Area
  - Total: 60.9 km^{2} (23.5 sq mi)
- Elevation: 1,008 m (3,307 ft)

Population (Dec 2011)
  - Total: 1,366
  - Density: 22.4/km^{2} (58.1/sq mi)
- Time zone: UTC+01:00 (CET)
  - Summer (DST): UTC+02:00 (CEST)
- Postal code: 3772
- SFOS number: 793
- ISO 3166 code: CH-BE
- Surrounded by: Zweisimmen, Diemtigen, Adelboden, Lenk and Saanen
- Website: www.ststephan.ch

St. Stephan (German pronunciation: [zaŋkt ˈʃtɛfan]) is a municipality in the Obersimmental-Saanen administrative district in the canton of Bern in Switzerland. The namesake is the First Century martyr.

== History ==
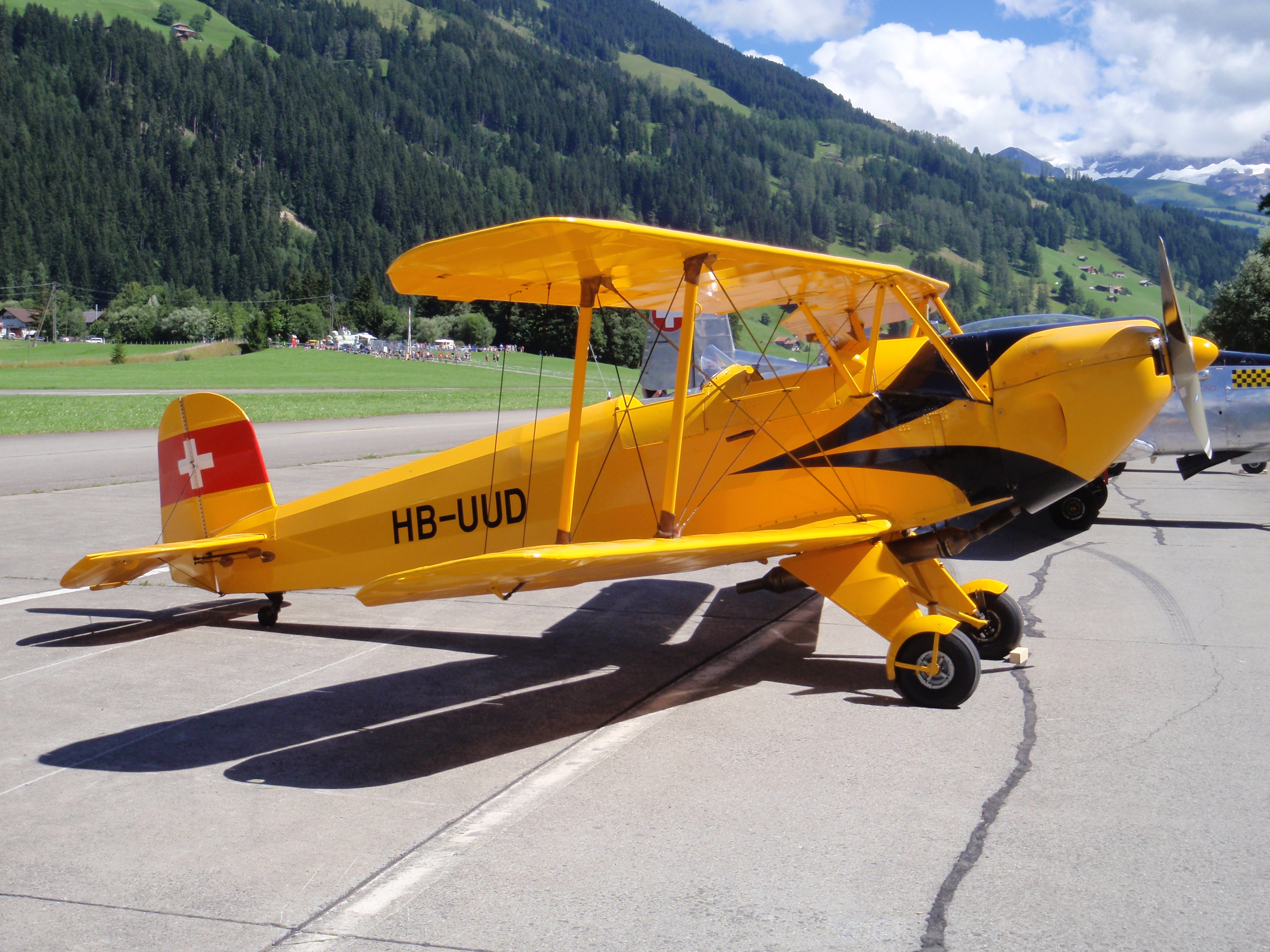
A Bücker Bü 131 Jungmann at St. Stephan Airport

St. Stephan is first mentioned in 1352 as Sant Stephan.

The village grew out of a Burgundian royal estate located in a pass to Valais. In 994 the royal family donated St. Stephan to Selz Abbey. Eventually the village became part of the lands of the Freiherr of Raron. In 1456 it passed to the Bubenberg family and then in 1494 was acquired by the city of Bern.

The village church of St. Stephan was built in the Early Middle Ages. The original building was renovated and expanded in the 12th and 15th centuries. It was originally a filial church of the parish church in Zweisimmen. In 1335 Interlaken Monastery took over the patronage of St. Stephan. In the 15th century the residents began attempting to break away from the monastery and form their own parish. Despite authorization from the Pope in 1430 and a decision of the Council of Basel in 1433, the monastery remained in control. Finally, in 1525, the villagers were released from the monastery's patronage and formed their own parish. Three years later, in 1528, Bern adopted the new faith of the Protestant Reformation. Interlaken Monastery and majority of the Bernese Oberland resisted the new faith. However, in the same year, Bern forced the Oberland, including St. Stephan, to convert.

Traditionally the villagers of the municipality raised crops on the valley floor for local consumption. Beginning in the 16th century, they started to trade for grain from the cities of the Swiss Plateau and raised cattle for meat, milk and cheese on the valley floor and in seasonal alpine herding camps. In 1912 a railroad connected St. Stephan with Zweisimmen and tourists began to flock to the alpine village. During World War II, in 1944, a military airport opened in the municipality. It became a civilian airport in the later 1990s. Today some of the residents still raise cattle or produce cheese or work in the tourist industry. About one-third of the working population commute to Zweisimmen or other towns for work.

== Geography ==
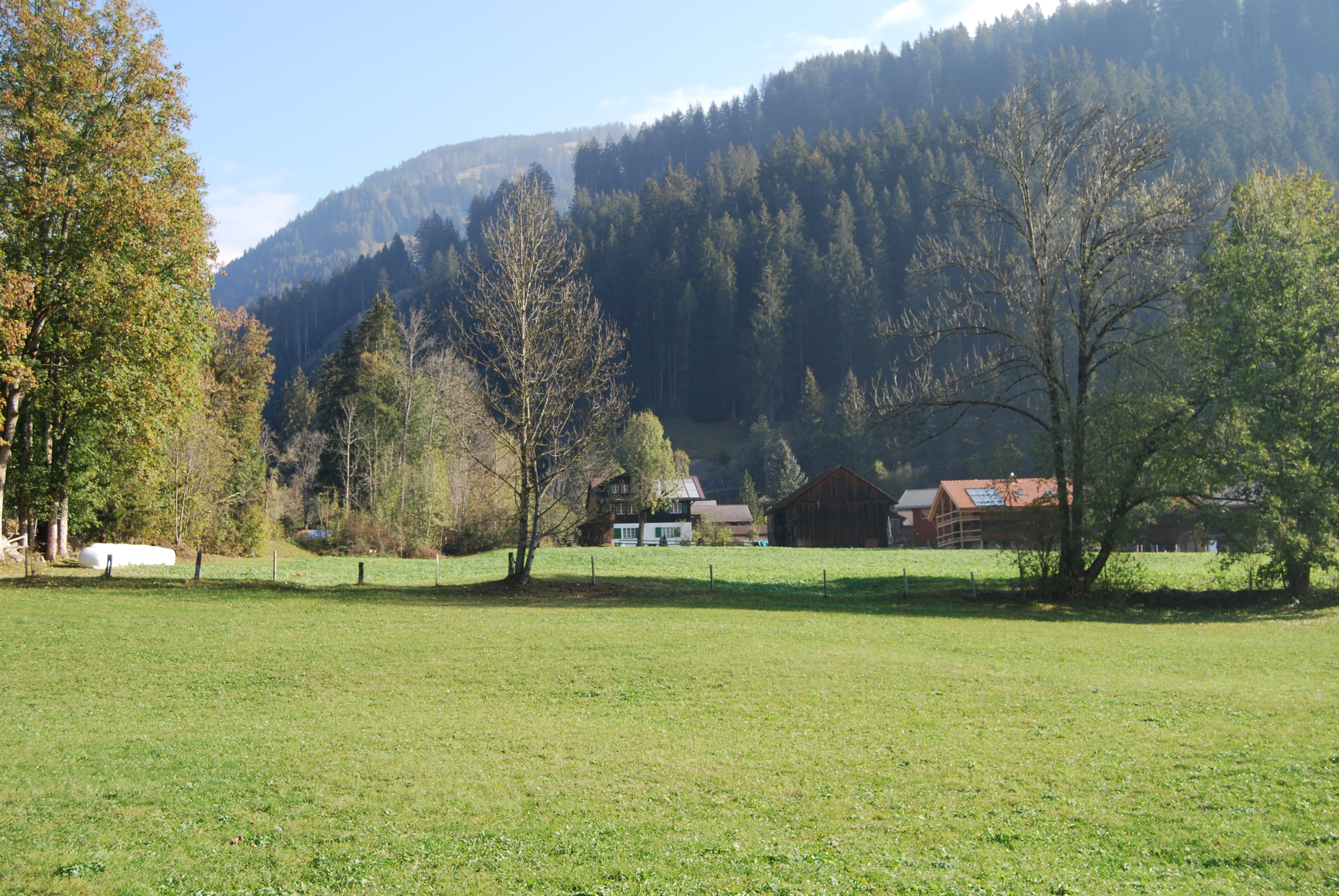
St. Stephan and surrounding mountains

St. Stephan has an area of 60.89 km^{2} (23.51 sq mi). As of 2012, a total of 30.8 km^{2} (11.9 mi^{2}) or 50.6% is used for agricultural purposes, while 19.39 km^{2} (7.49 mi^{2}) or 31.8% is forested. The rest of the municipality is 1.48 km^{2} (0.57 mi^{2}) or 2.4% is settled (buildings or roads), 0.45 km^{2} (0.17 mi^{2}) or 0.7% is either rivers or lakes and 8.73 km^{2} (3.37 mi^{2}) or 14.3% is unproductive land.

During the same year, housing and buildings made up 0.9% and transportation infrastructure made up 1.2%. A total of 26.8% of the total land area is heavily forested and 3.4% is covered with orchards or small clusters of trees. Of the agricultural land, 9.8% is pasturage and 40.7% is used for alpine pastures. All the water in the municipality is flowing water. Of the unproductive areas, 6.9% is unproductive vegetation and 7.5% is too rocky for vegetation.

St. Stephan lies in the Bernese Oberland in the Simmental between Zweisimmen and Lenk. The municipality includes Albristhorn (2,762 m (9,062 ft)).

The municipality consists of the cooperative farming villages (Bäuerten) of Ried, Häusern, Grodey, Matten, Fermel, Obersteg and Zu Hähligen. There is not a place known as St. Stephan.

At the bottom of the valley is a 2,050 m (6,730 ft) paved airfield. A private firm controls the service. The field was built for the military, but it is used for both civilian and military purposes.

On 31 December 2009 Amtsbezirk Obersimmental, the municipality's former district, was dissolved. On the following day, 1 January 2010, it joined the newly created Verwaltungskreis Obersimmental-Saanen.

== Coat of arms ==
The blazon of the municipal coat of arms is Argent on a Mount Vert St. Stephen proper passant haloed Or clad Purpure holding in his dexter hand and reading an open book bound Gules and in his sinister a Palm Branch Vert and carrying in a Pouch Stones of the first.

== Demographics ==
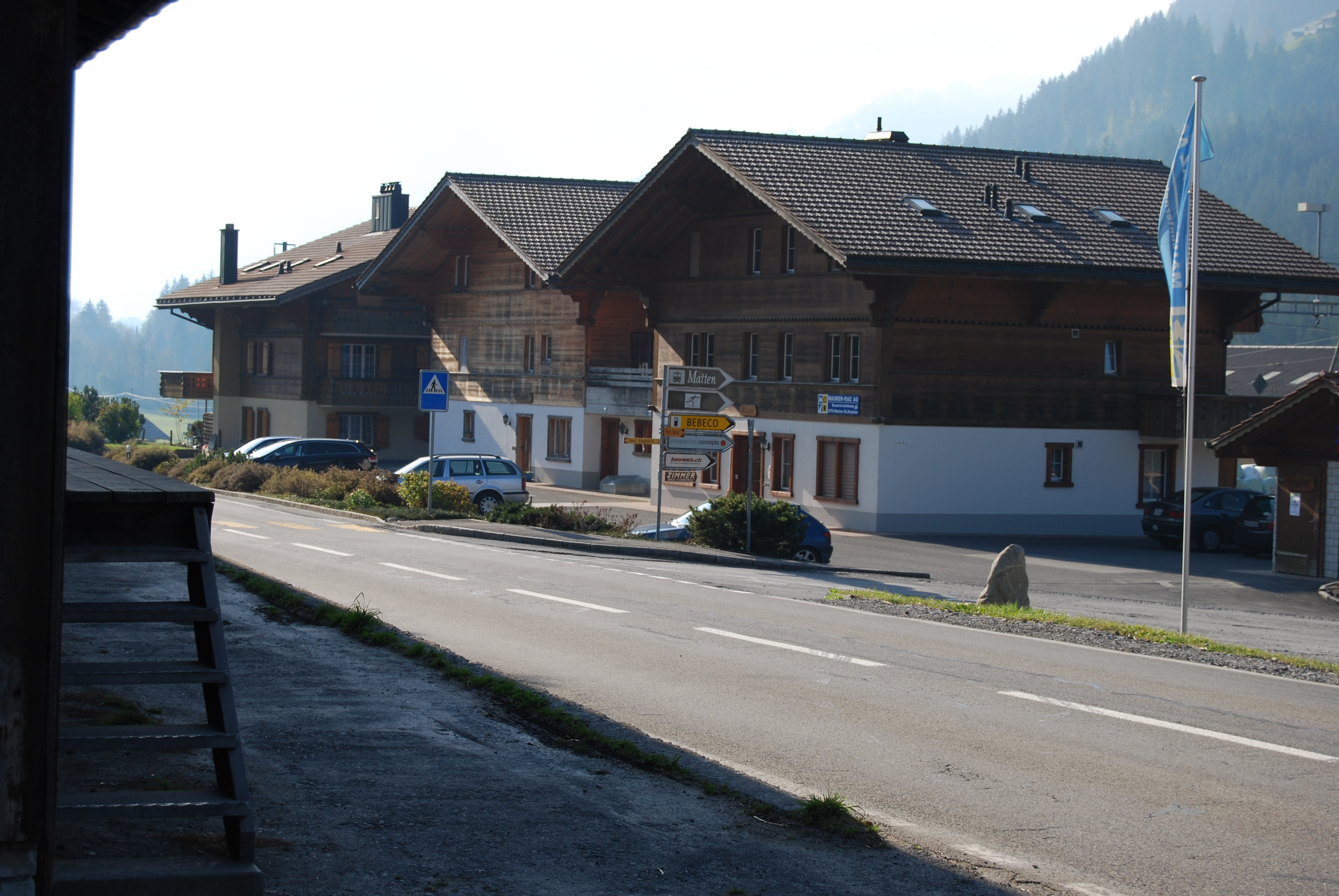
Matten village in the municipality of St. Stephan

St. Stephan has a population (as of December 2020) of 1,310. As of 2011, 8.9% of the population are resident foreign nationals. Over the last year (2010-2011) the population has changed at a rate of -0.5%. Migration accounted for -2.3%, while births and deaths accounted for 0.2%.

Most of the population (as of 2000) speaks German (1,321 or 95.7%) as their first language, Albanian is the second most common (17 or 1.2%) and Serbo-Croatian is the third (12 or 0.9%). There are 5 people who speak French and 10 people who speak Italian.

Of the population in the municipality, 771 or about 55.8% were born in St. Stephan and lived there in 2000. There were 387 or 28.0% who were born in the same canton, while 69 or 5.0% were born somewhere else in Switzerland, and 104 or 7.5% were born outside of Switzerland.

As of 2011, children and teenagers (0–19 years old) make up 22.5% of the population, while adults (20–64 years old) make up 57.4% and seniors (over 64 years old) make up 20.1%.

As of 2000, there were 612 people who were single and never married in the municipality. There were 633 married individuals, 98 widows or widowers and 38 individuals who are divorced.

As of 2010, there were 157 households that consist of only one person and 75 households with five or more people. In 2000, a total of 493 apartments (65.4% of the total) were permanently occupied, while 218 apartments (28.9%) were seasonally occupied and 43 apartments (5.7%) were empty. As of 2010, the construction rate of new housing units was 1.5 new units per 1000 residents. The vacancy rate for the municipality, in 2010, was 0.59%. In 2011, single family homes made up 25.1% of the total housing in the municipality.

The historical population is given in the following chart:

== Politics ==
In the 2011 federal election the most popular party was the Swiss People's Party (SVP) which received 60.5% of the vote. The next three most popular parties were the Federal Democratic Union of Switzerland (EDU) (12.7%), the Conservative Democratic Party (BDP) (9.4%) and the Social Democratic Party (SP) (4.8%). In the federal election, a total of 697 votes were cast, and the voter turnout was 65.4%.

== Economy ==
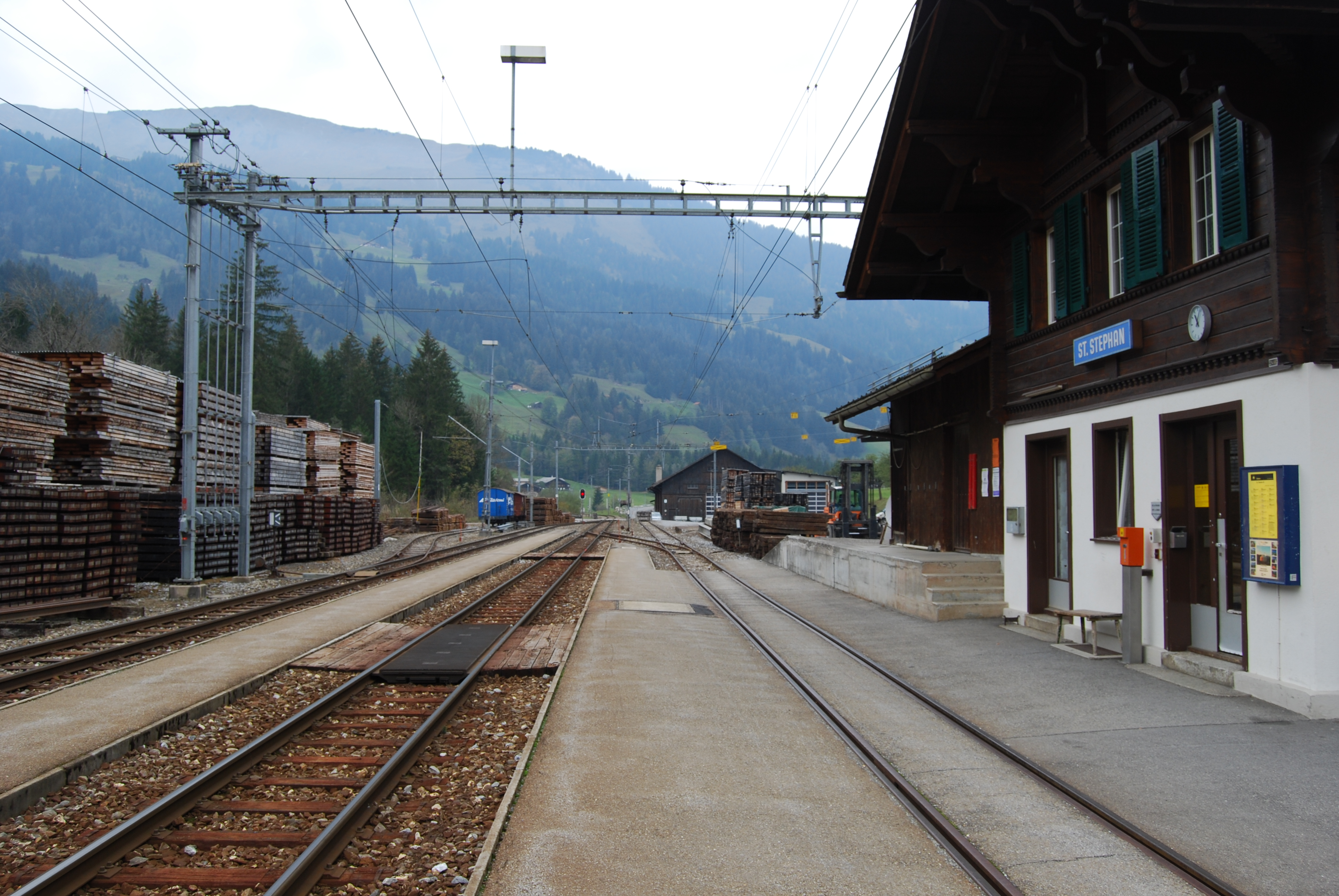
St. Stephan train station. About one-third of the workers commute to jobs in neighboring towns

As of 2011, St. Stephan had an unemployment rate of 1.28%. As of 2008, there were a total of 548 people employed in the municipality. Of these, there were 262 people employed in the primary economic sector and about 86 businesses involved in this sector. 154 people were employed in the secondary sector and there were 17 businesses in this sector. 132 people were employed in the tertiary sector, with 34 businesses in this sector. There were 688 residents of the municipality who were employed in some capacity, of which females made up 39.7% of the workforce.

In 2008 there were a total of 387 full-time equivalent jobs. The number of jobs in the primary sector was 154, of which 145 were in agriculture and 9 were in forestry or lumber production. The number of jobs in the secondary sector was 137 of which 84 or (61.3%) were in manufacturing and 53 (38.7%) were in construction. The number of jobs in the tertiary sector was 96. In the tertiary sector; 28 or 29.2% were in wholesale or retail sales or the repair of motor vehicles, 8 or 8.3% were in the movement and storage of goods, 25 or 26.0% were in a hotel or restaurant, 3 or 3.1% were the insurance or financial industry, 2 or 2.1% were technical professionals or scientists, 13 or 13.5% were in education and 7 or 7.3% were in health care.

In 2000, there were 87 workers who commuted into the municipality and 352 workers who commuted away. The municipality is a net exporter of workers, with about 4.0 workers leaving the municipality for every one entering. A total of 335 workers (79.4% of the 422 total workers in the municipality) both lived and worked in St. Stephan. Of the working population, 15.1% used public transportation to get to work, and 55.2% used a private car.

In 2011 the average local and cantonal tax rate on a married resident, with two children, of St. Stephan making 150,000 CHF was 13%, while an unmarried resident's rate was 19.1%. For comparison, the average rate for the entire canton in the same year, was 14.2% and 22.0%, while the nationwide average was 12.3% and 21.1% respectively.

In 2009 there were a total of 527 tax payers in the municipality. Of that total, 121 made over 75,000 CHF per year. There were 14 people who made between 15,000 and 20,000 per year. The greatest number of workers, 140, made between 50,000 and 75,000 CHF per year. The average income of the over 75,000 CHF group in St. Stephan was 101,374 CHF, while the average across all of Switzerland was 130,478 CHF.

In 2011 a total of 0.9% of the population received direct financial assistance from the government.

== Religion ==
From the 2000 census, 1,025 or 74.2% belonged to the Swiss Reformed Church, while 66 or 4.8% were Roman Catholic. Of the rest of the population, there were 4 members of an Orthodox church (or about 0.29% of the population), there was 1 individual who belongs to the Christian Catholic Church, and there were 136 individuals (or about 9.85% of the population) who belonged to another Christian church. There were 39 (or about 2.82% of the population) who were Muslim. There were 2 individuals who belonged to another church. 42 (or about 3.04% of the population) belonged to no church, are agnostic or atheist, and 66 individuals (or about 4.78% of the population) did not answer the question.

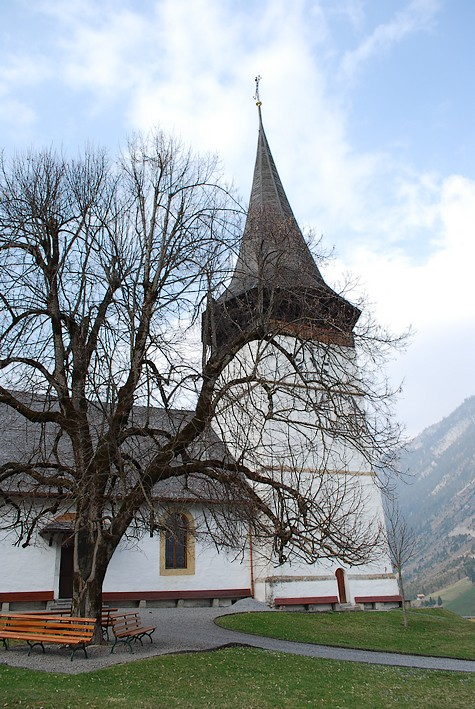
St. Stephan Church

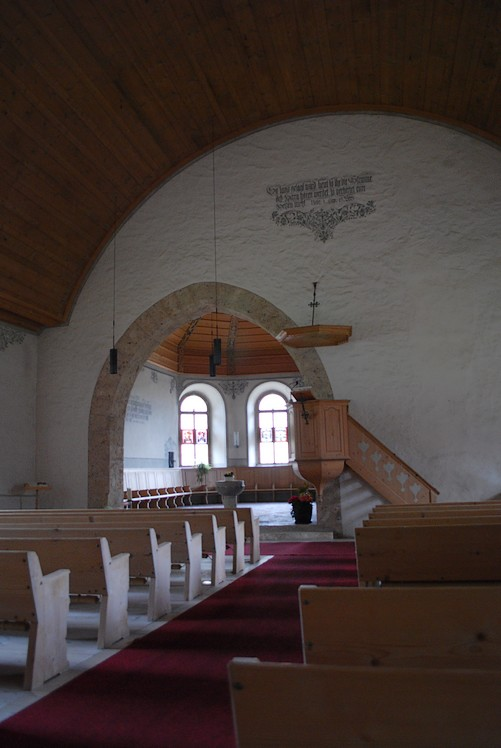
Interior of church

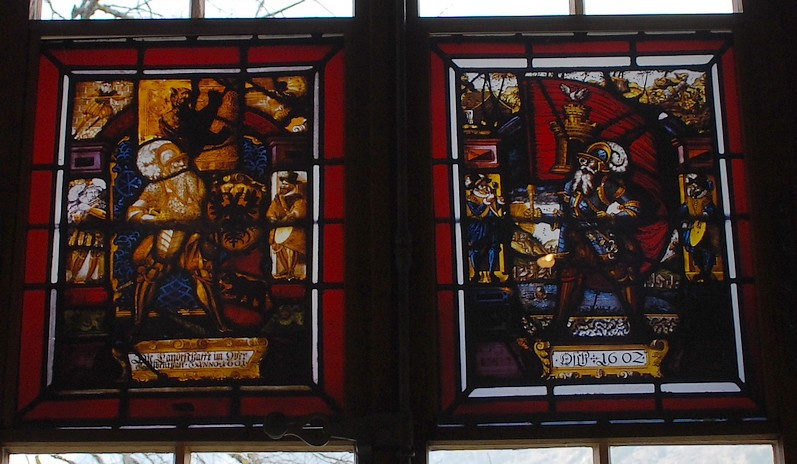
Vitraux within church

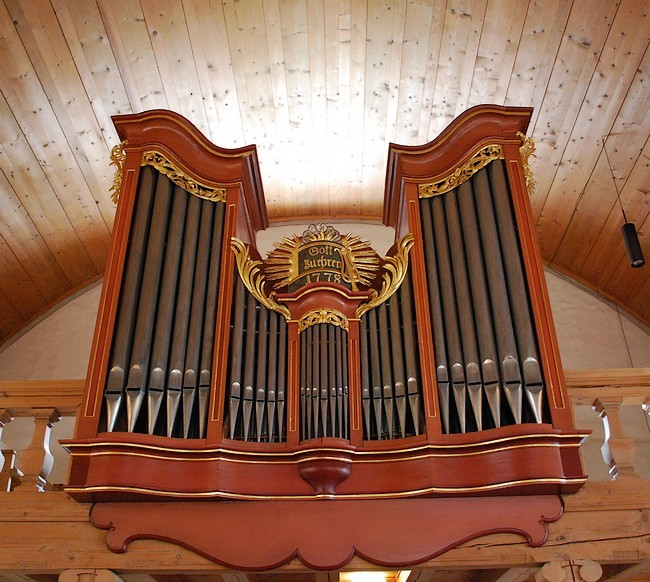
Organ (1778)

== Education ==
In St. Stephan about 50.8% of the population have completed non-mandatory upper secondary education, and 9.3% have completed additional higher education (either university or a Fachhochschule). Of the 72 who had completed some form of tertiary schooling listed in the census, 72.2% were Swiss men, 22.2% were Swiss women.

The Canton of Bern school system provides one year of non-obligatory Kindergarten, followed by six years of Primary school. This is followed by three years of obligatory lower Secondary school where the students are separated according to ability and aptitude. Following the lower Secondary students may attend additional schooling or they may enter an apprenticeship.

During the 2011-12 school year, there were a total of 97 students attending classes in St. Stephan. There was one kindergarten class with a total of 22 students in the municipality. Of the kindergarten students, 18.2% were permanent or temporary residents of Switzerland (not citizens) and 18.2% have a different mother language than the classroom language. The municipality had 3 primary classes and 70 students. Of the primary students, 11.4% were permanent or temporary residents of Switzerland (not citizens) and 12.9% have a different mother language than the classroom language. During the same year, there was one lower secondary class with a total of 5 students.

As of 2000, there were a total of 205 students attending any school in the municipality. Of those, 174 both lived and attended school in the municipality, while 31 students came from another municipality. During the same year, 33 residents attended schools outside the municipality.

== Notable people ==
- August Fetscherin (1849 in St. Stephan – 1882 in Zäziwil) was a Swiss physician. Between 1874-82, he was the first Swiss doctor to follow up on the development of cretinism in a young girl after a complete thyroidectomy
