= Kocher (surname) =

Kocher (German pronunciation: [ˈkɔxɐ]) is a German surname. Notable people with the surname include:

- Emil Theodor Kocher (1841–1917), Swiss surgeon and Nobel prize winner
- Martina Kocher, Swiss luger
- Paul Kocher, American cryptographer
- Paul H. Kocher, German-American author
- Zina Kocher, Canadian biathlete
