= Edgar Bonjour =

Swiss historian (1898–1991)

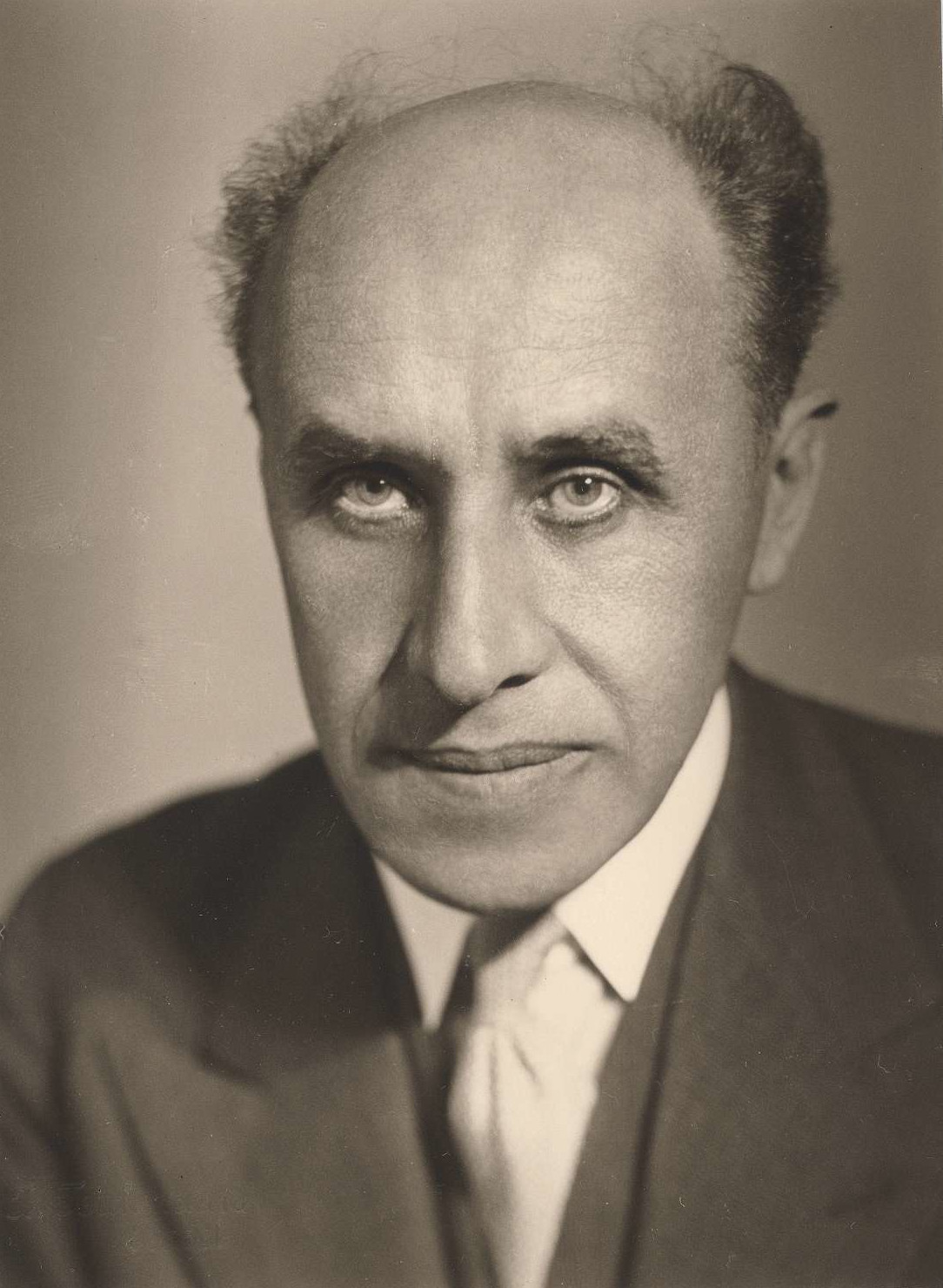
- Born: 21 August 1898; Bern, Switzerland
- Died: 26 May 1991 (aged 92); Basel, Switzerland
- Occupation: Historian
- Spouse: Dora Kocher (m. 1941)
- Parents: Jules Bonjour (father); Maria Schuler (mother)
- Relatives: Theodor Kocher (his wife's grandfather)

Edgar Bonjour (21 August 1898 – 26 May 1991) was a Swiss historian. From 1935 to 1968 he was full professor of Swiss history and modern general history at the University of Basel. His life's theme was the history of Swiss neutrality, which he developed into a six-volume work (1965–1970); the last three volumes were written on behalf of the Federal Council.

== Biography ==
Edgar Bonjour was born on 21 August 1898 in Bern, the son of Jules Bonjour, a federal official (postal director), and Maria née Schuler. In 1941 he married Dora Kocher.

Bonjour attended schools in Bern and studied the humanities at the University of Bern, with history as his main subject. In 1921 he passed the higher teaching examination (Oberlehrerexamen), and from 1922 to 1933 he taught at a Gymnasium in Bern. He obtained his doctorate in 1923. In 1933 he became a senior official (Adjunkt) and deputy director at the Federal Archives, and in the same year he completed his habilitation at the University of Bern. From 1935 to 1968 he was full professor (ordentlicher Professor) of Swiss history and modern general history at the University of Basel, and in 1946 he was its rector. Bonjour remained active as an academic teacher and as an author of historical contributions into old age.

Because of its topicality at the time, the history of Swiss neutrality became Bonjour's life's theme. After a first short publication (1943), he developed the subject in several stages into a monumental six-volume work (1965–1970). The last three volumes, written on behalf of the Federal Council, were also translated into French. Three volumes of documents followed by 1976, and an abridged version in 1978.

Bonjour also worked on many other subjects: above all the history of Swiss historiography, and also, each time in step with the corresponding anniversary years, the creation of the Swiss federal state (1947/48), Basel's membership of the Confederation (1951) and the history of the University of Basel (1960). In 1981 he published a work on the well-known surgeon Theodor Kocher, his wife's grandfather.

Bonjour received honorary doctorates from the universities of Neuchâtel and St. Gallen and was a member of various European academies of sciences. He died in Basel on 26 May 1991.

== Works ==
- Die Schweiz und Europa, 8 vols., 1958–1988 (with a list of works)
- Erinnerungen, 1983
- (editor) Freundesbriefe, 1987

== Bibliography ==
- Neue Zürcher Zeitung, 30 May 1991
- H. R. Guggisberg, "Edgar Bonjour, 1898–1991", in Historische Zeitschrift 254, 1992, 222–228
- Basler Zeitung, 20 August 1998
