= August Fetscherin =

Swiss physician

August Fetscherin (German pronunciation: [aʊ̯ɡʊst ˈfɛtʃəʁɪn]; 28 March 1849, in St. Stephan – 18 March 1882, in Zäziwil) was a Swiss medical doctor.

He visited the Gymnasium in Bern, studied medicine in Bern and Zurich and passed the medicinal degree in Bern in 1871. He was assistant in the insane asylum Waldau, went to Vienna and Berlin for further education and settled as physician in Zäziwil in 1873. In 1879, he was the co-founder and first director of the hospital Höchstetten. Between 1874-82, he was the first Swiss doctor to follow up on the development of cretinism in a young girl after a complete thyroidectomy. He reported his findings to Theodor Kocher in 1874, 9 years before Kocher made this finding public.

In 1873, he married Maria Barbara Brunner, from Luzern.

The family name Fetscherin is originally from Bern. The name is originally from 1520 and the family Fetscherin belongs to the "Burgergemeinde Bern" which is the burial community of the city of Bern in Switzerland. The Fetscherins are among the 18,000 "Burger" and belong to the guild of Mohren from 1383.
