= Hermann Askan Demme =

German-Swizz doctor

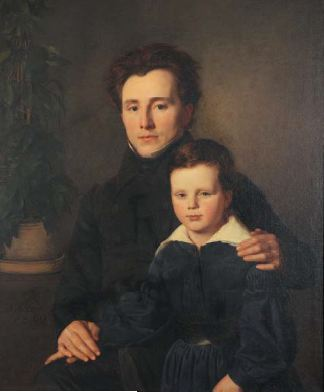
Hermann Askan Demme with son Hermann Rudolf Demme, by Johann Friedrich Dietler, 1840.

Hermann Askan Demme (* 28 August 1802 in Altenburg; † 18 January 1867 in Bern) was a German-Swiss physician.

Demme was the son of Hermann Gottfried, Generalsuperintendent of Sachsen-Altenburg. At first, he studied philosophy and theology in Jena and Berlin. 1822 he entered the Jenaischen Burschenschaft. He finished his studies 1830 and became assistant to Johann Lukas Schönlein. 1831 he was a military doctor in Warschau, 1832 he visited the United States of America.

In 1833, Demme married Marie Lucie Elisabeth Auguste Diruf (1808-1882) from Heidelberg. They had one daughter and three sons. In the same year, he became professor for anatomy at the University of Zurich and 1834 he became professor at the University of Bern. 1847 he was the first in the German-speaking world to perform surgery using ether for anesthesia.

== Works ==
- Allgemeine Chirurgie der Schusswunden. Nach eigenen Erfahrungen in den norditalienischen Lazarethen von 1859 und mit Benutzung der bisherigen Leistungen, Bd. 1 von Militärchirurgische Studien, Würzburg 1863. online
- Beiträge zur pathologischen Anatomie des Tetanus und einiger anderen Krankheiten des Nervensystems, Leipzig und Heidelberg 1859. online
- Über die Veränderungen der Gewebe durch Brand. Ein Beitrag zur Pathologischen Histologie, Frankfurt a. M. 1857. online

== Sources ==
- Marie Lucie Elisabeth Auguste Demme-Diruf: Eine Erfahrung aus meinem Leben und zugleich ein Leitweg zu meiner Menschenkenntniss, s.l., ca. 1866 (Universitätsarchiv Bern).

== Literature ==
- Helge Dvorak: Biografisches Lexikon der Deutschen Burschenschaft. Band I Politiker, Teilband 1: A-E. Heidelberg 1996, S. 190–191.
- Rahel Hert: Hermann Askan Demme (1802-1867). Der erste Chirurgieprofessor der Universität Bern. Leben und Werk, Bern 2011 (Diss.).
- "Hermann Askan Demme" in German, French and Italian in the online Historical Dictionary of Switzerland.
- Hermann Rennefahrt, E. Hintzsche, 600 Jahre Inselspital, Bern 1954.
- Sammlung Bernischer Biographien, Bd. 3 (1898), S. 481–518.
