= Inselspital =

Coordinates: 46°56′50″N 7°25′28″E

University Hospital of Bern
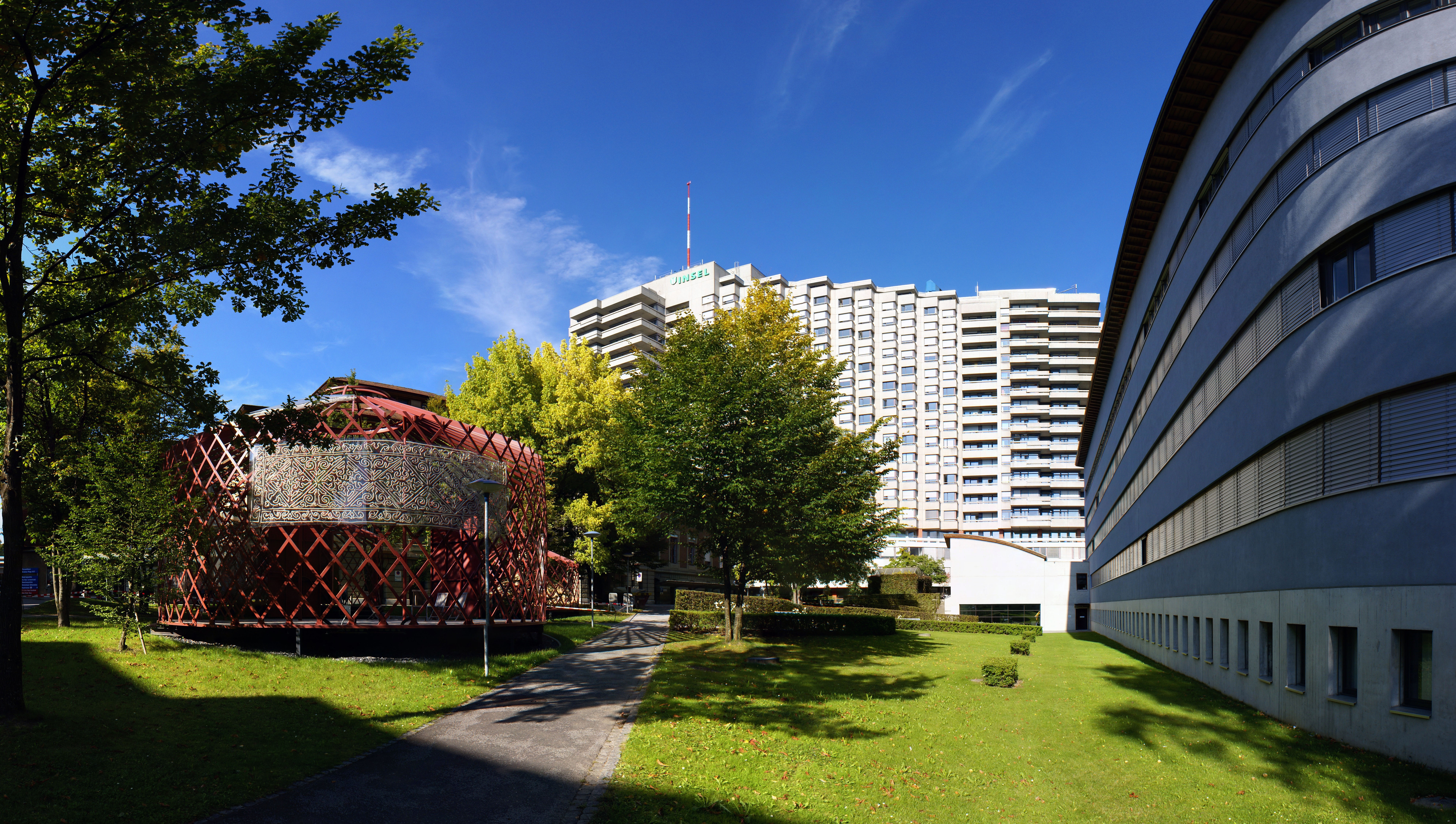
- The Inselspital patient ward (center) and polyclinic ward 2 (right)

Geography
- Location: Bern, Switzerland

Organisation
- Type: Teaching
- Affiliated university: University of Bern

Services
- Emergency department: Yes

Links
- Website: www.insel.ch

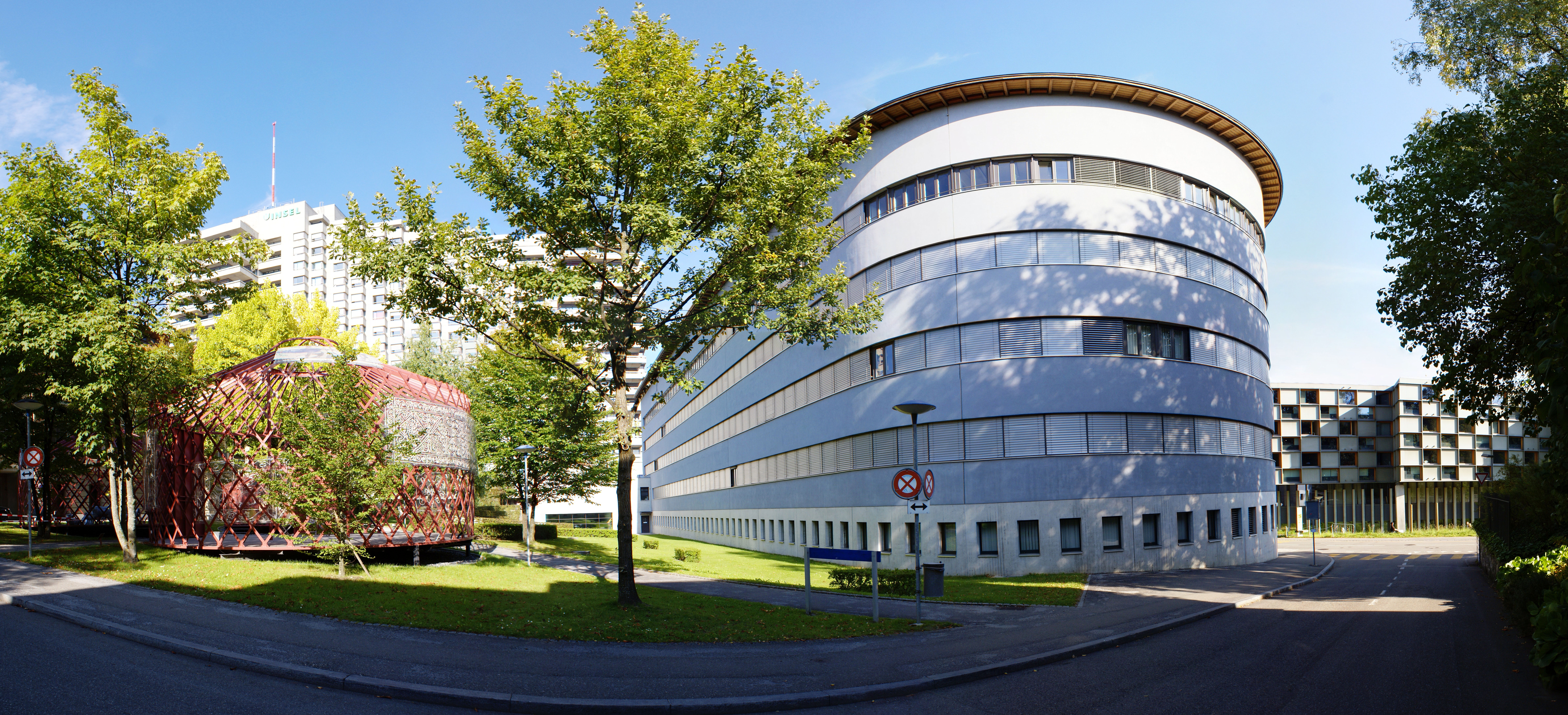
Part of the hospital complex

The Inselspital, also named the University Hospital of Bern (German: Universitätsspital Bern), located in Bern, is one of the five university hospitals of Switzerland. It is associated with the University of Bern.

The hospital is operated by a charitable foundation established in 1354 through the will of Anna Seiler, a wealthy Bernese. It acquired its current name in 1531 when it occupied the buildings of the "St. Michaels Insel" convent. From 1841 on, it has participated in the training of medical students.

The hospital moved to its present location in 1885. Many of the historic buildings were demolished from 1958 to 1978 and replaced by modern infrastructure, including a high-rise patient building.

As of 2016, the hospital employs a staff of 7,255 and provides care for 250,000 patients each year. It also provides practical training to 600 medical students and over 1,000 other healthcare professionals.

The prominent physicians who have practiced in the Inselspital include Emil Theodor Kocher, the 1909 Nobel laureate.

== Bibliography ==
- Fritz Leu (ed.): Das Inselspital: Geschichte des Universitätsspitals Bern, 1954–2004. Weber, Thun/Gwatt 2006, ISBN 3-909532-36-5
