= Kocher manoeuvre =

Surgical procedure

The Kocher manoeuvre is a surgical procedure to expose structures in the retroperitoneum behind the duodenum and pancreas. In vascular surgery, it is described as a method to expose the abdominal aorta. It usually has been in contrast to midline laparotomy and right retroperitoneal space dissection. These two procedures have been used for diverse cases, but have approximately equivalent outcomes.

The Kocher manoeuvre may also refer to a procedure used to reduce anterior shoulder dislocations by externally rotating the shoulder, before adducting and internally rotating it.

== Uses ==
- Access to the porta hepatis:
  - The Kocher manoeuvre allows access to the porta hepatis, the gateway to the liver.
  - By mobilizing the duodenum and pancreas, surgeons gain exposure to the structures in the hepatic portal area.
- Exposure of hepatoduodenal ligament:
  - The procedure facilitates the dissection and exposure of the hepatoduodenal ligament.
  - This exposure is crucial for various hepatic and biliary surgeries.
- Visualizing the common bile duct:
  - The manoeuvre provides visualization of the common bile duct.
  - Surgeons can palpate and examine the peripheral parts of the common bile duct, aiding in procedures involving this duct.
- Foramen of Winslow access:
  - Opening the foramen of Winslow is achievable through the Kocher manoeuvre.
  - This allows surgeons to access the lesser sac, facilitating procedures in this region.
- Superior mesenteric artery exposure:
  - The SMA is a critical vascular structure, and the Kocher manoeuvre exposes its supramesenteric segment.
  - This exposure is valuable for identifying and managing aberrant vessels, such as the right hepatic artery arising from the SMA.
- Control of portal vein in hemorrhage:
  - In cases of hemorrhage, especially around the portal vein, the Kocher manoeuvre provides access and control.
  - Surgeons can manage bleeding effectively, ensuring hemostasis.
- Abdominal exploration and mobilization:
  - The manoeuvre allows for exploration and mobilization of the duodenum and head of the pancreas.
  - This is crucial in various surgeries involving these structures, including tumor resections and other abdominal procedures.
- Mesoduodenum restoration:
  - Restoring the mesoduodenum renders the duodenum movable.
  - This is particularly important in surgeries where the mobility of the duodenum is a factor, such as in addressing obstructions or abnormalities.
- Identification of anatomical structures:
  - Surgeons can identify and visualize important anatomical structures, such as the veins of Retzius, during the Kocher manoeuvre.
  - This knowledge is vital for avoiding inadvertent damage to critical structures.
- Assessment of pancreatic vascular arcades:
  - The manoeuvre aids in the assessment of pancreatic vascular arcades.
  - Surgeons can use this information for procedures like embolectomy or aortomesenteric bypass.
- Exposure for surgical anatomy studies:
  - The Kocher manoeuvre serves as a valuable tool for studying surgical anatomy.

== Technique ==
The Kocher manoeuvre involves the following steps:

1. Patient Positioning: The liver is retracted upwards, and the right colic flexure is retracted downwards. The surgeon typically stands on the left side of the patient for better access.
2. Duodenal Mobilization: The surgeon rolls the second part of the duodenum, making an incision about 3 cm from the duodenal rim. The duodenum, along with the head of the pancreas, is mobilized, detached from the inferior vena cava and aorta, with the superior mesenteric vessels limiting further mobilization.
3. Fascial Layers: Underlying the duodenum and head of the pancreas is an avascular plane known as the fusion fascia of Treitz. This fascia, along with the pancreatic capsule, is crucial for the bloodless detachment and mobilization of these structures.
4. Mesoduodenum Restoration: The Kocher manoeuvre restores the mesoduodenum, rendering the duodenum movable. The posterior surfaces of the duodenum and pancreas become visible, allowing for the examination of the hidden peripheral parts of the common bile duct.
5. Portal Exposure: The manoeuvre exposes the porta hepatis, allows dissection of the hepatoduodenal ligament, and provides access to the lesser sac by opening the foramen of Winslow.
6. Limitations: The Kocher manoeuvre has limitations, as only the first and proximal second parts of the duodenum and the head of the pancreas can be mobilized. For complete mobilization, the Cattell manoeuvre is required, involving the mobilization and reflection of the cecum, ascending colon, and right colic flexure

== History ==
In 1895, Jourdain first talked about moving the duodenum in the body. Theodor Kocher, after whom the manoeuvre is named, wrote a detailed explanation of this in 1903. He explained that during early development, the duodenum is freely hanging in the belly. In children, it's even more flexible, but as they grow, it sticks to the back of the belly and is covered in a layer of peritoneum. Kocher figured out that by loosening it, the duodenum could be moved like it was in the early stages of development.

Kocher also knew that the duodenum and pancreas are initially hanging freely in the belly, connected by a mesentery. The Kocher maneuver brings these organs back to their original position in the belly. Since Kocher's time, people have learned more about how the duodenum and pancreas develop and settle into their final position in the body. This study will briefly explain these processes, outline the surgical anatomy of the area, and discuss some clinical issues related to embryology and anatomy.
