= Kocher's sign =

Medical sign

Kocher's sign is a medical sign that denotes an eyelid phenomenon in hyperthyroidism and Basedow's disease. In fixation on a fast upwards movement there occurs a convulsive retraction of the eyelid.
