= Belmont-sur-Montreux railway station =

Railway station in Montreux, Switzerland

Belmont-sur-Montreux
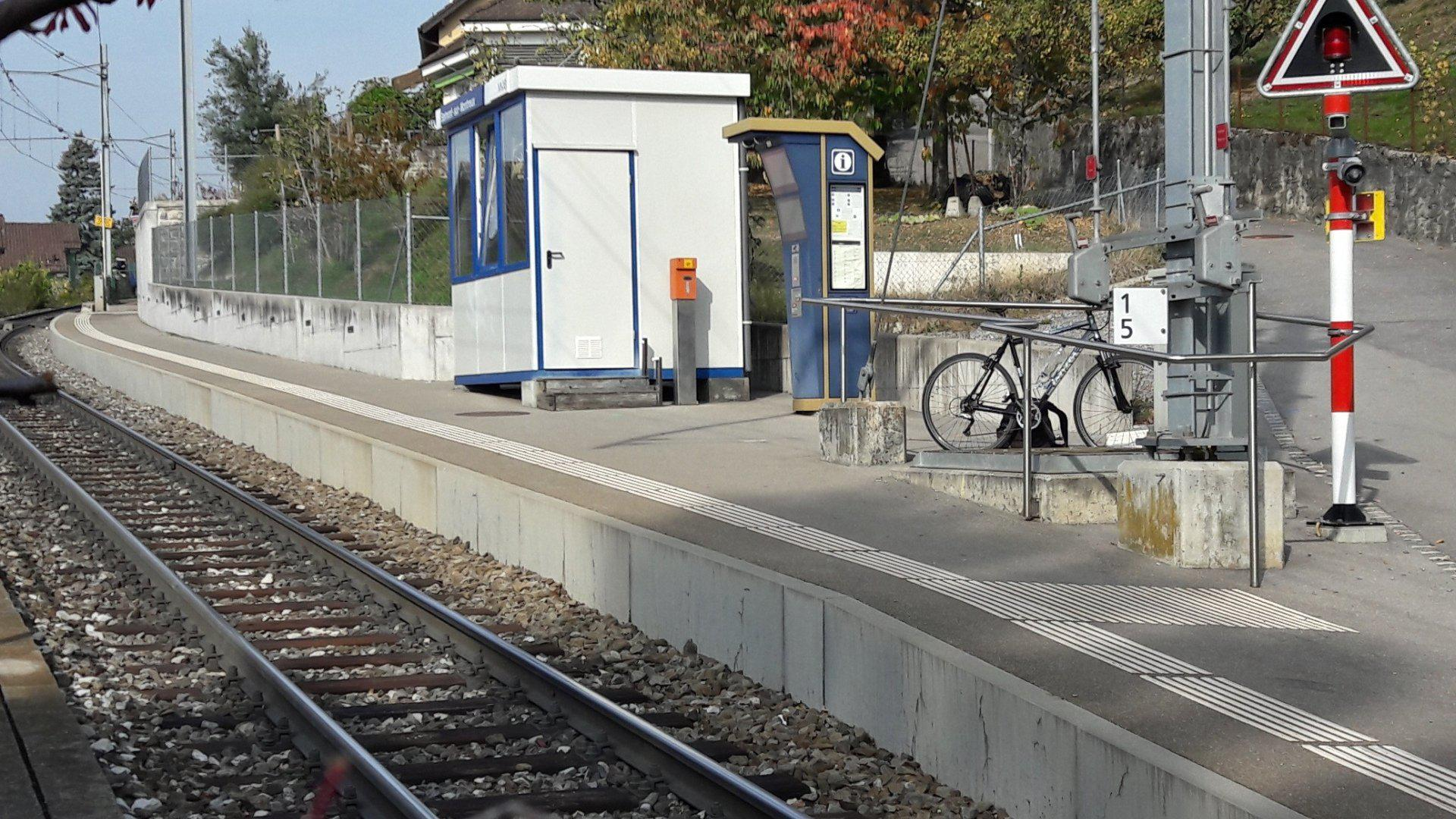
- The station in 2018

General information
- Location: Montreux, Vaud; Switzerland
- Coordinates: 46°26′31″N 6°54′22″E
- Elevation: 462 m (1,516 ft)
- Owner: Montreux Oberland Bernois Railway
- Operator: Montreux Oberland Bernois Railway
- Line: Montreux–Lenk im Simmental line
- Distance: 1.5 km (0.93 mi) from Montreux
- Platforms: 1 side platform
- Tracks: 1
- Train operators: Montreux Oberland Bernois Railway

Construction
- Accessible: Yes

Other information
- Station code: 8501390 (BEMM)
- Fare zone: 73 (mobilis)

History
- Opened: 18 December 1901

Passengers
- 2023: Fewer than 50 people per day (MOB)

Services
Preceding station	Montreux Oberland Bernois Railway	Following station
Vuarennes towards Montreux	R34	Châtelard VD towards Les Avants
Location

Belmont-sur-Montreux railway station (French: Gare de Belmont-sur-Montreux) is a railway station in the municipality of Montreux, in the Swiss canton of Vaud. It is an intermediate stop and a request stop on the 1,000 mm (3 ft 3 3/8 in) metre gauge Montreux–Lenk im Simmental line of the Montreux Oberland Bernois Railway.

== Services ==
As of the December 2024 timetable change, the following services stop at Belmont-sur-Montreux:

- Regio: hourly service between Montreux and Les Avants or Château-d'Oex.
