= Montreux-Collège railway station =

Railway station in Montreux, Switzerland

Montreux-Collège
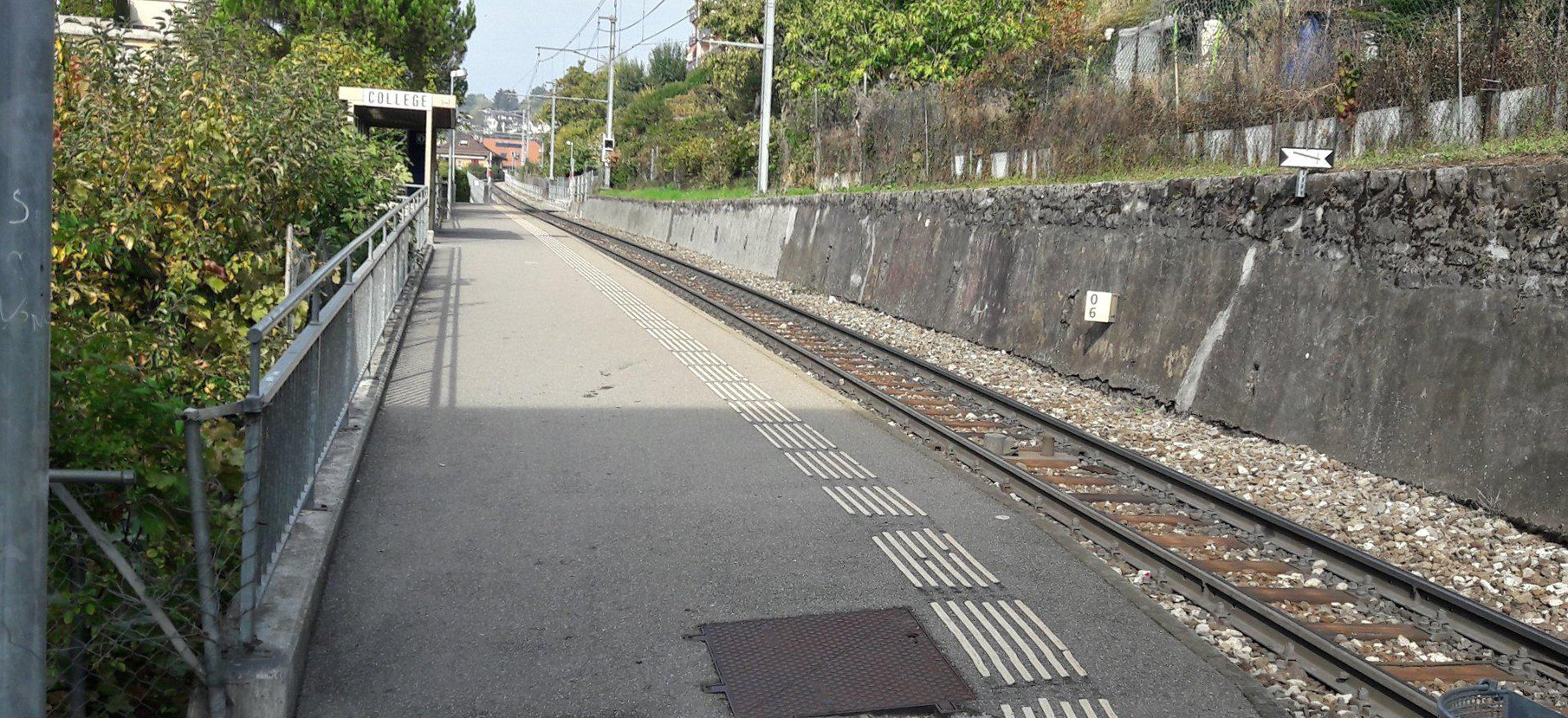
- The station in 2018

General information
- Location: Montreux, Vaud; Switzerland
- Coordinates: 46°26′10″N 6°54′46″E
- Elevation: 424 m (1,391 ft)
- Owner: Montreux Oberland Bernois Railway
- Line: Montreux–Lenk im Simmental line
- Distance: 0.7 km (0.43 mi) from Montreux
- Platforms: 1 side platform
- Tracks: 1
- Train operators: Montreux Oberland Bernois Railway

Construction
- Accessible: Yes

Other information
- Station code: 8501380 (CGE)
- Fare zone: 73 (mobilis)

History
- Opened: 18 December 1901

Passengers
- 2023: 120 per weekday (MOB)

Services
Preceding station	Montreux Oberland Bernois Railway	Following station
Montreux Terminus	R34	Vuarennes towards Les Avants
Location

Montreux-Collège railway station (French: Gare de Montreux-Collège), is a railway station in the municipality of Montreux, in the Swiss canton of Vaud. It is an intermediate stop and a request stop on the 1,000 mm (3 ft 3 3/8 in) metre gauge Montreux–Lenk im Simmental line of Montreux Oberland Bernois Railway.

== Services ==
As of the December 2024 timetable change, the following services stop at Montreux-Collège:

- Regio: hourly service between Montreux and Les Avants or Château-d'Oex.

== Bibliography ==
- Wägli, Hans G.; Jacobi, Sébastien (2010). Schienennetz Schweiz - Bahnprofil Schweiz CH+ [Swiss rail network] (in German) (3rd ed.). Zürich: AS Verlag. ISBN 978-3-909111-74-9.
