= Lötschberg =

Mountain massif in Valais, Switzerland

- Lötschen Pass
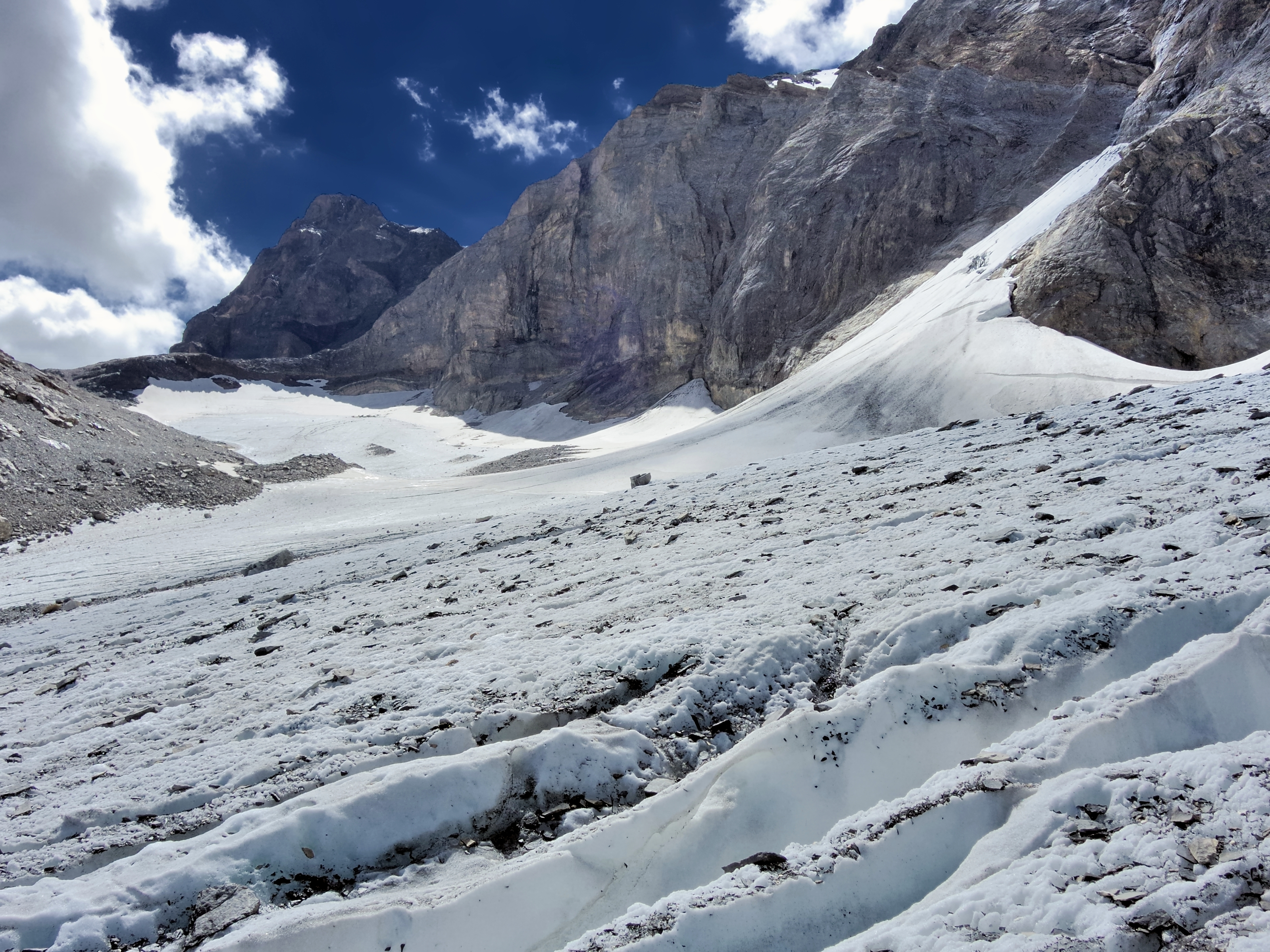
- The Lötschen Pass (left) from the glacier

- Location within Switzerland
- Elevation: 2,676 metres (8,780 ft)
- Traversed by: Trail (2,690 m); Railway tunnels

Third Approach
- Location: Bern/Valais, Switzerland
- Range: Bernese Alps
- Coordinates: 46°24′58″N 7°42′59″E
- Topo map: Swiss Federal Office of Topography swisstopo

The Lötschberg is an Alpine mountain massif, usually associated with a major, historically important transit axis of the Alps in Switzerland with, at its core, the Lötschen Pass (German: Lötschenpass, Swiss German: Lötschepass). The mountain pass, which culminates at nearly 2,700 metres above sea level, are part of the eastern Bernese Alps, whose main crest straddles the border between the cantons of Bern and Valais. The valleys concerned by the Lötschberg are those of the Kander in the Berner Oberland, with Kandersteg at the head of it, and a secluded side-valley of the Upper Valais, the Lötschental, with Ferden at the valley's entrance and at the bottom of the pass.

Although the Lötschberg is one of the main north-south axes through the Alps, it is not on the main chain of the Alps, the Pennine Alps, further south, making up the main water divide. As a main north-south axis through the Alps, the Lötschberg is thus completed by the Simplon, between Brig and Domodossola in Italy. The Lötschberg alone constitutes an important shortcut from the Swiss Plateau to the Upper Valais, the alternative route involving a long detour via the lower Rhone Valley (Monthey) around the western end of the Bernese Alps.

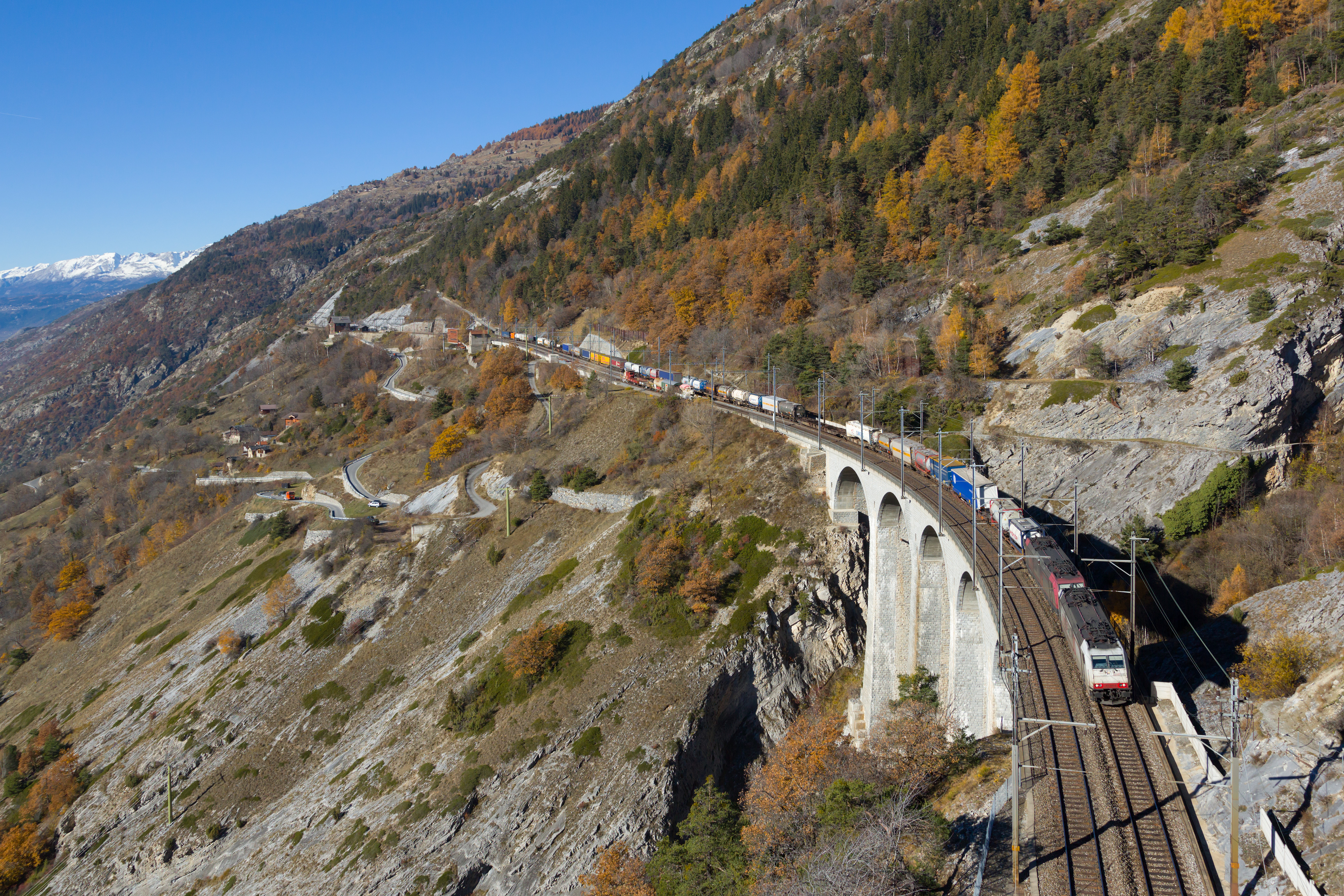
The Lötschberg railway line (southern approach)

The Lötschberg is crossed by two railway lines and tunnels. The first line, the Lötschberg railway line was opened to traffic in 1913. It has at its centre the 14.6 kilometre-long Lötschberg (Culmination) Tunnel, with portals in Kandersteg (BE) and Goppenstein (VS). It culminates at a height of 1,240 metres and is the highest railway on the main Swiss network. The second line, since 2007, uses the 34.6 kilometre-long Lötschberg Base Tunnel, which has its portals in Frutigen (BE) and Raron (VS). The maximum height of the new railway is 828 metres. Both railways are connected to the Simplon railway, which runs from Lausanne to Domodossola (and further to Milan) via the Simplon Tunnel.

Unlike the Gotthard, the other main north-south axis in Switzerland, the Lötschberg is not crossed by a road pass nor by a road tunnel. However, a car shuttle train is operated between Kandersteg railway station and Goppenstein railway station.

The Lötschen Pass itself is the lowest point (2,676 m) on the crest between the Balmhorn to the west and the high range west of the Jungfrau to the east, making up the water divide between the Rhine (north) and the Rhone (south). On the north side of the pass is a two kilometre-long glacier named Lötschengletscher. Although it is a glacier pass, the Lötschen Pass can be crossed by hikers without mountaineering equipment and a mountain hut, the Lötschenpasshütte, is located on the top of the pass. The pass is traversed by a trail (reaching 2,690 m) from Kandersteg via the secluded Gastern Valley to Ferden. The complete traverse from the railway station of Kandersteg to that of Goppenstein lasts about 10 hours. On the south side the approach can be shortened by a few hours starting from Lauchernalp, accessible by cable car from Kippel.

Transit across the Lötschberg
Route	Type	Major tunnel	Since	Maximum height	Remarks
Lötschen Pass	Path	-	Later Neolithic	2,690 m	Glacier pass
Lötschberg Railway (summit line)	Railway	Lötschberg Tunnel	1913	1,240 m	Highest conventional railway in Switzerland, car shuttle train services since 1954
Lötschberg Railway (base line)	High-speed railway	Lötschberg Base Tunnel	2007	828 m	First high-speed railway through the Bernese Alps, world's longest land railway tunnel until 2016

== See also ==
- Lötschental
- List of mountain passes in Switzerland
- Lötschberg Tunnel
- Lötschberg Base Tunnel
- NRLA
