= Lötschberg (disambiguation) =

Lötschberg is an Alpine mountain massif in Switzerland.

Lötschberg may also refer to:

- Lötsche Pass, an Alpine mountain pass over the Lötschberg
- Lötschberg railway line, a railway line which underpasses the mountain
- Lötschberg Tunnel, a 14.6km tunnel opened in 1913
- Lötschberg Base Tunnel, a 34.6km tunnel opened in 2007
- PS Lötschberg, a 1914 paddle steamer which operates on Lake Brienz, Switzerland

== See also ==
- Bern-Lötschberg-Simplon Railway, builders of Lötschberg Tunnel, a predecessor of the Swiss railway company BLS AG
