= Ferden =

- Municipality
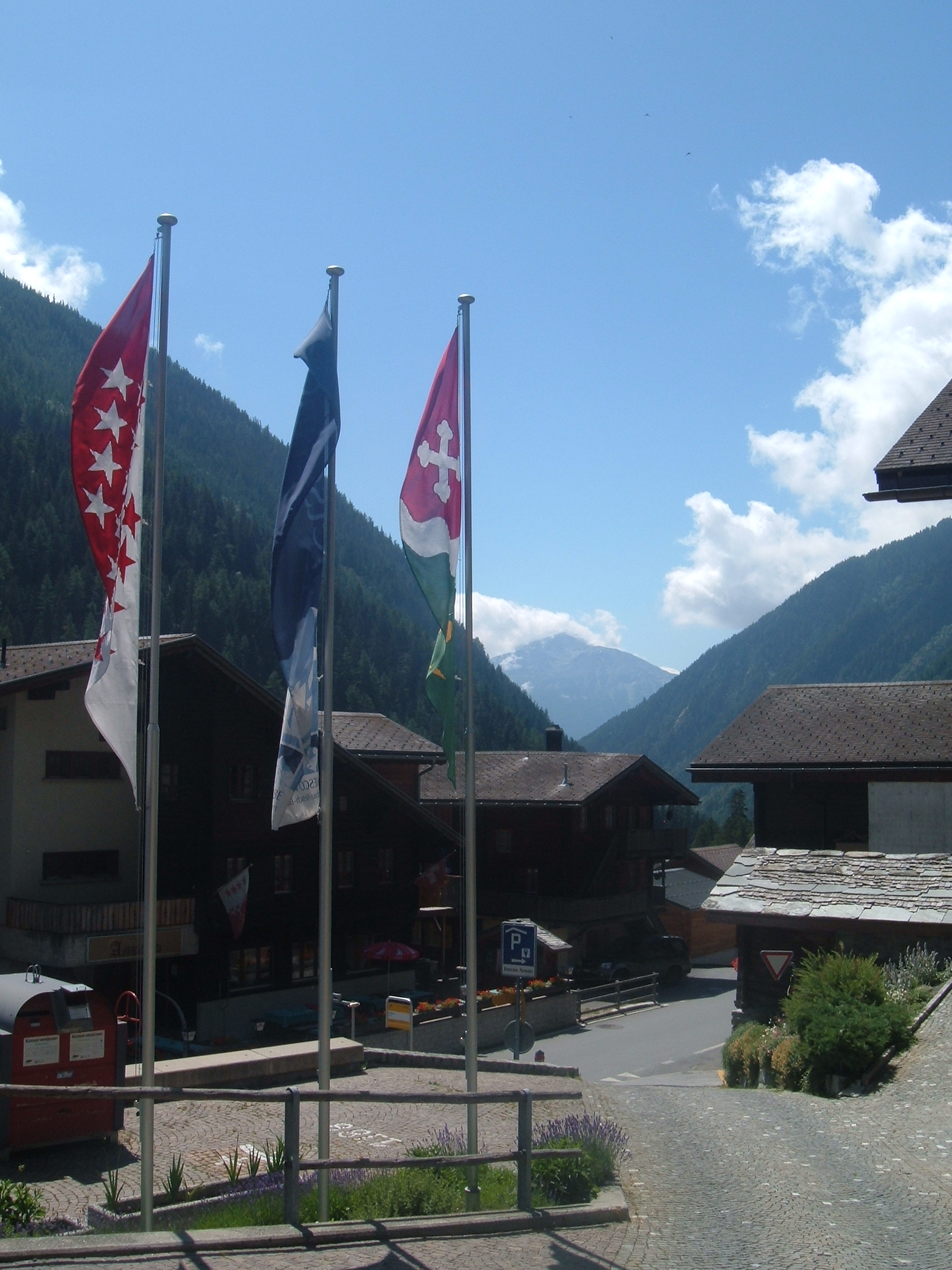
- Ferden village

- Flag Coat of arms
- Location of Ferden
- Location within Switzerland Location within Canton of Valais
- Coordinates: 46°22′N 7°45′E
- Country: Switzerland
- Canton: Valais
- District: Raron

Government
  - Mayor: Dionys Werlen

Area
  - Total: 27.89 km^{2} (10.77 sq mi)
- Elevation: 1,389 m (4,557 ft)

Population (December 2002)
  - Total: 342
  - Density: 12.3/km^{2} (31.8/sq mi)
- Time zone: UTC+01:00 (CET)
  - Summer (DST): UTC+02:00 (CEST)
- Postal code: 3916
- SFOS number: 6195
- ISO 3166 code: CH-VS
- Surrounded by: Erschmatt, Gampel, Guttet-Feschel, Kandersteg (BE), Kippel, Leukerbad, Niedergesteln, Steg
- Website: https://www.ferden.ch SFSO statistics

Ferden is a municipality in the district of Raron in the canton of Valais in Switzerland. Besides the village of Ferden itself, the municipality includes the hamlet of Goppenstein, and the alpine settlements of Faldum, Resti and Kummen.

== History ==
Ferden is first mentioned in 1380 as Verdan.

== Geography ==
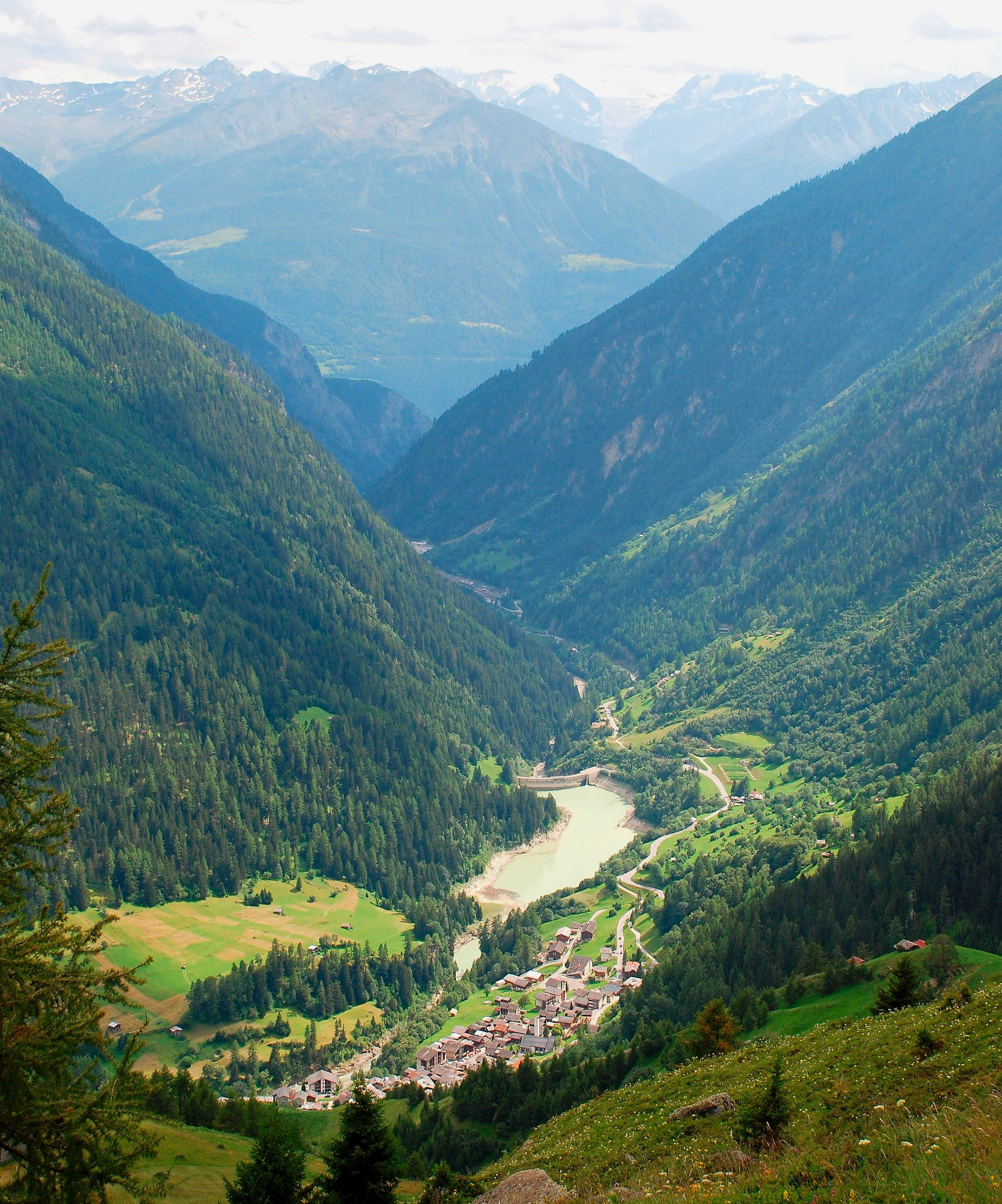
Ferden and the lower Lötschen valley

Ferden has an area, as of 2009, of 27.9 square kilometers (10.8 mi^{2}). Of this area, 4.93 km^{2} (1.90 mi^{2}) or 17.7% is used for agricultural purposes, while 5.38 km^{2} (2.08 mi^{2}) or 19.3% is forested. Of the rest of the land, 0.22 km^{2} (0.085 mi^{2}) or 0.8% is settled (buildings or roads), 0.32 km^{2} (0.12 mi^{2}) or 1.1% is either rivers or lakes and 17.05 km^{2} (6.58 mi^{2}) or 61.1% is unproductive land.

Of the built up area, housing and buildings made up 0.2% and transportation infrastructure made up 0.5%. Out of the forested land, 14.4% of the total land area is heavily forested and 2.6% is covered with orchards or small clusters of trees. Of the agricultural land, 1.3% is pastures and 16.4% is used for alpine pastures. Of the water in the municipality, 0.4% is in lakes and 0.8% is in rivers and streams. Of the unproductive areas, 17.5% is unproductive vegetation, 41.8% is too rocky for vegetation and 1.8% of the land is covered by glaciers.

The municipality is located in the Westlich Raron district. It is at the bottom of the Lötschen valley at an elevation of 1,370 m (4,490 ft). It consists of the haufendorf village (an irregular, unplanned and quite closely packed village, built around a central square) of Ferden, the hamlet of Goppenstein, and the alpine settlements of Faldum, Resti and Kummen.

Stausee Ferden is a reservoir on the Lonza River.

== Coat of arms ==
The blazon of the municipal coat of arms is Per fess by a bar wavy Argent, in chief Gules a Cross bottony Argent and in base Vert the Host Argent radiating Or issuant from a Cup Or.

== Demographics ==
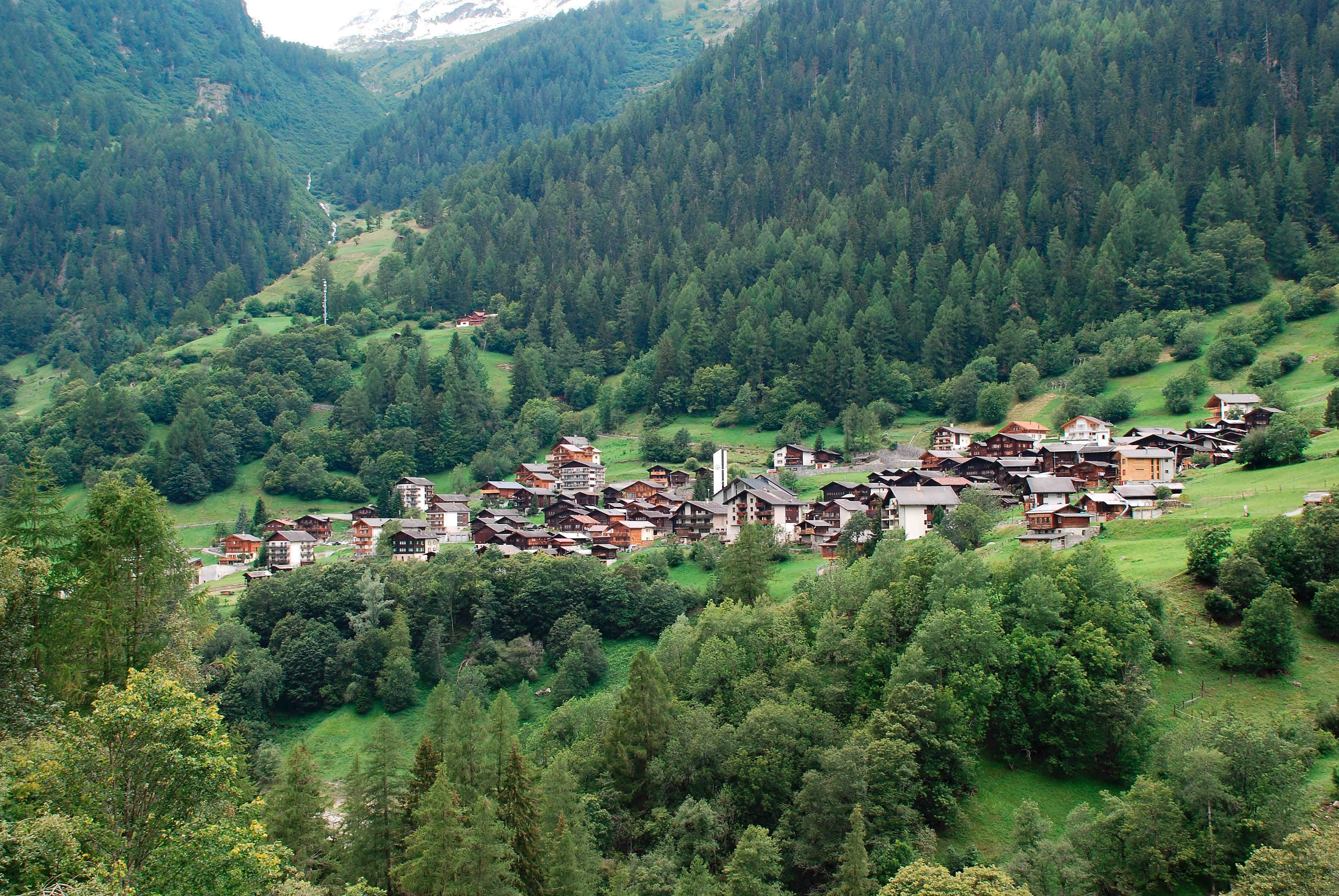
Ferden village

Ferden has a population (as of December 2020) of 247. As of 2008, 1.1% of the population are resident foreign nationals. Over the last 10 years (2000–2010 ) the population has changed at a rate of -17.9%. It has changed at a rate of -5.3% due to migration and at a rate of -6.3% due to births and deaths.

Most of the population (as of 2000) speaks German (280 or 97.9%) as their first language, Italian is the second most common (4 or 1.4%) and French is the third (1 or 0.3%).

As of 2008, the population was 51.5% male and 48.5% female. The population was made up of 135 Swiss men (51.5% of the population) and (0.0%) non-Swiss men. There were 125 Swiss women (47.7%) and 2 (0.8%) non-Swiss women. Of the population in the municipality, 214 or about 74.8% were born in Ferden and lived there in 2000. There were 43 or 15.0% who were born in the same canton, while 17 or 5.9% were born somewhere else in Switzerland, and 10 or 3.5% were born outside of Switzerland.

As of 2000, children and teenagers (0–19 years old) make up 22.4% of the population, while adults (20–64 years old) make up 60.1% and seniors (over 64 years old) make up 17.5%.

As of 2000, there were 145 people who were single and never married in the municipality. There were 123 married individuals, 16 widows or widowers and 2 individuals who are divorced.

As of 2000, there were 112 private households in the municipality, and an average of 2.5 persons per household. There were 36 households that consist of only one person and 9 households with five or more people. In 2000, a total of 106 apartments (63.5% of the total) were permanently occupied, while 46 apartments (27.5%) were seasonally occupied and 15 apartments (9.0%) were empty. The vacancy rate for the municipality, in 2010, was 4.02%.

The historical population is given in the following chart:

== Politics ==
In the 2007 federal election the most popular party was the CVP which received 75.24% of the vote. The next three most popular parties were the SVP (15.88%), the SP (6.28%) and the FDP (1.66%). In the federal election, a total of 125 votes were cast, and the voter turnout was 54.1%.

In the 2009 Conseil d'État/Staatsrat election a total of 156 votes were cast, of which 15 or about 9.6% were invalid. The voter participation was 67.0%, which is much more than the cantonal average of 54.67%. In the 2007 Swiss Council of States election a total of 125 votes were cast, of which 3 or about 2.4% were invalid. The voter participation was 54.1%, which is much less than the cantonal average of 59.88%.

== Economy ==
As of 2010, Ferden had an unemployment rate of 0.8%. As of 2008, there were 26 people employed in the primary economic sector and about 16 businesses involved in this sector. 6 people were employed in the secondary sector and there were 2 businesses in this sector. 68 people were employed in the tertiary sector, with 10 businesses in this sector. There were 145 residents of the municipality who were employed in some capacity, of which females made up 40.7% of the workforce.

In 2008 the total number of full-time equivalent jobs was 67. The number of jobs in the primary sector was 9, all of which were in agriculture. The number of jobs in the secondary sector was 5, all of which were in construction. The number of jobs in the tertiary sector was 53. In the tertiary sector; 2 or 3.8% were in wholesale or retail sales or the repair of motor vehicles, 37 or 69.8% were in the movement and storage of goods and 8 or 15.1% were in a hotel or restaurant.

In 2000, there were 75 workers who commuted into the municipality and 107 workers who commuted away. The municipality is a net exporter of workers, with about 1.4 workers leaving the municipality for every one entering. Of the working population, 34.5% used public transportation to get to work, and 43.4% used a private car.

== Transport ==
Goppenstein railway station is within the municipality, is on the Lötschberg line, and is served by trains to Bern, Thun and Brig. It is also the southern terminus of a car carrying shuttle train to Kandersteg station via the Lötschberg tunnel.

The municipality straddles the road up the Lötschental valley from Steg to Fafleralp. A PostAuto bus service runs along the road as far as Fafleralp, connecting the upper valley settlements, including Blatten village, to Goppenstein station, with some buses continuing further down the valley to Steg.

== Religion ==
From the 2000 census, 274 or 95.8% were Roman Catholic, while 9 or 3.1% belonged to the Swiss Reformed Church. 1 (or about 0.35% of the population) belonged to no church, are agnostic or atheist, and 2 individuals (or about 0.70% of the population) did not answer the question.

== Education ==
In Ferden about 89 or (31.1%) of the population have completed non-mandatory upper secondary education, and 18 or (6.3%) have completed additional higher education (either university or a Fachhochschule). Of the 18 who completed tertiary schooling, 83.3% were Swiss men, 11.1% were Swiss women.

As of 2000, there were 16 students in Ferden who came from another municipality, while 26 residents attended schools outside the municipality.
