= Guggisee =

Lake in Valais, Switzerland

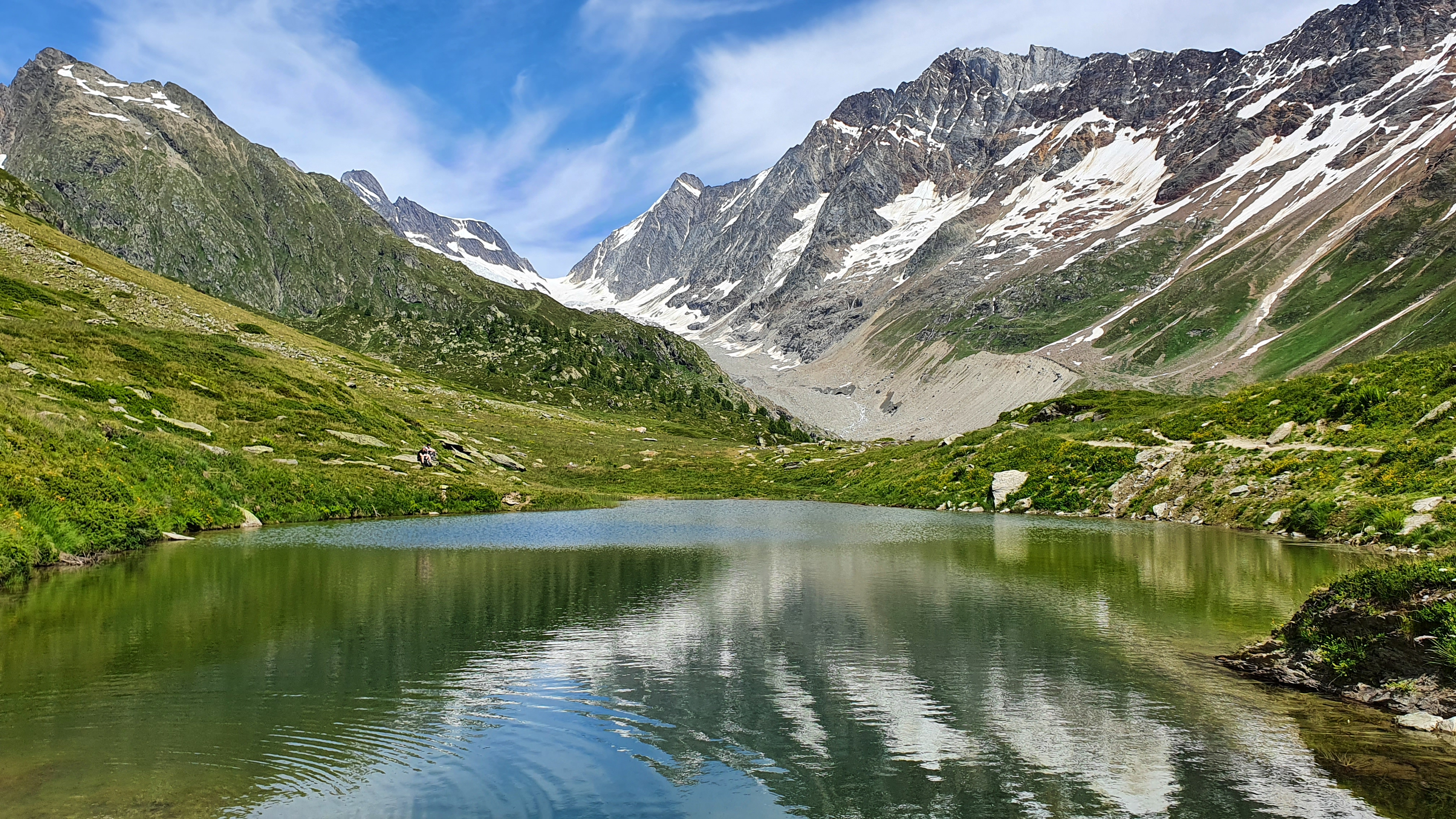

- Location within Canton of Valais Location within Switzerland
- Interactive map of Guggisee
- Location: Lötschental, Valais, Switzerland
- Coordinates: 46.444417°N 7.880761°E
- Primary outflows: tributary to the Lonza
- Basin countries: Switzerland
- Surface elevation: 2,007 m (6,585 ft)

Guggisee is a mountain lake in the Lötschental in the canton of Valais in Switzerland. The lake is located at an altitude of 2,007 m (6,585 ft) near the Alp Guggistafel.

== Access ==
From Fafleralp the Fafleralp circular trail leads to the Guggisee (walking time about one hour) and further to the Anusee and Anenhütte (Anen hut).
