= Blatten =

Blatten may refer to:

- Blatten bei Naters, a ski resort and village in the municipality of Naters in the Swiss canton of Valais
- Blatten (Lötschen), a village and municipality in the Lötschental valley in the Swiss canton of Valais, largely destroyed by a landslide in May 2025
- Blatten (Lucerne), a hamlet in the municipality of Malters in the Swiss canton of Lucerne
