= Goppenstein railway station =

Railway station in Ferden, Switzerland

Goppenstein
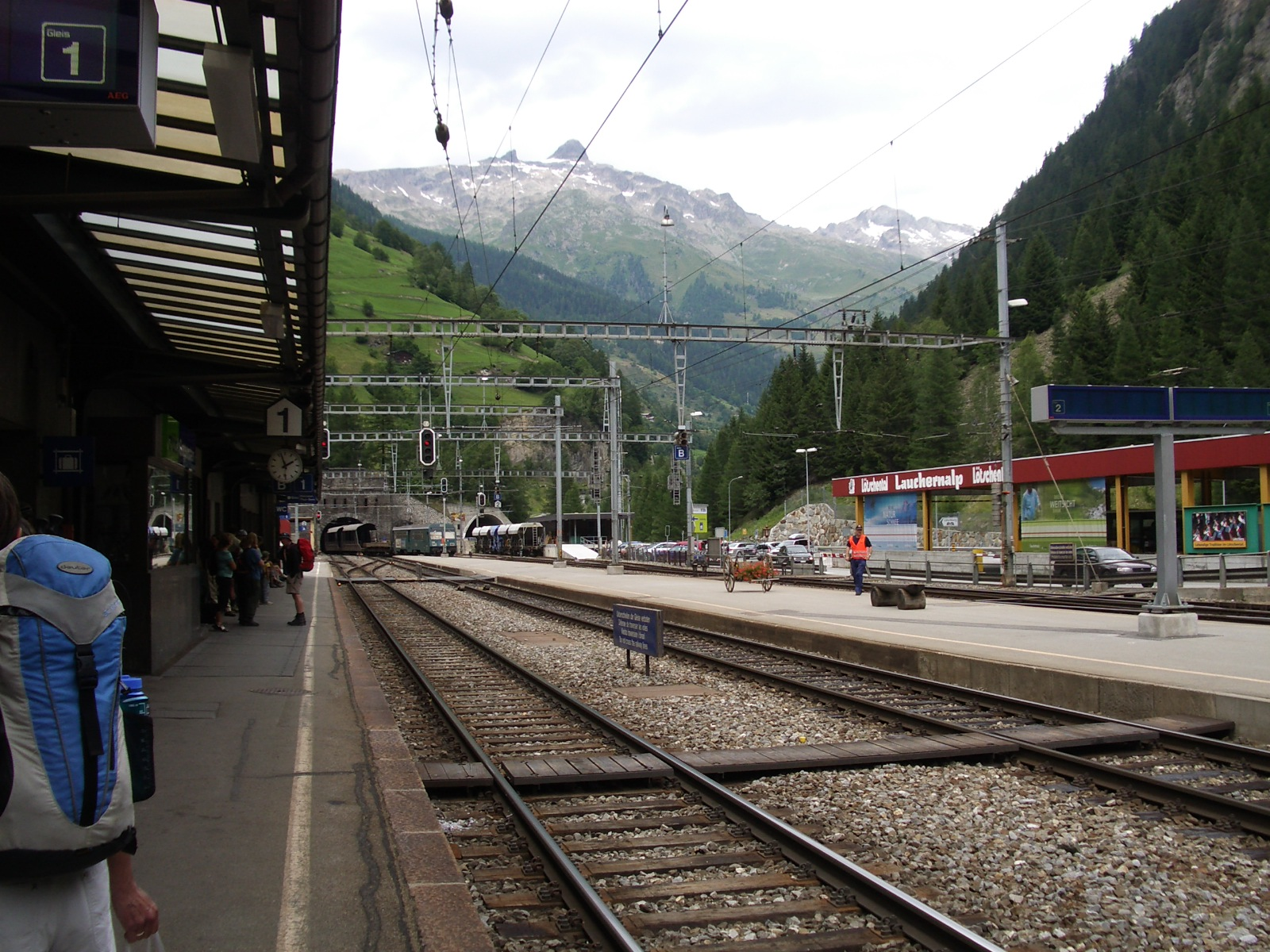
- The station in 2008

General information
- Location: Bahnhofstrasse; Ferden, Canton of Valais; Switzerland
- Coordinates: 46°22′03″N 7°45′20″E
- Elevation: 1,217 m (3,993 ft)
- Owner: BLS AG
- Line: Lötschberg line
- Distance: 48.4 km (30.1 mi) from Spiez
- Platforms: 2: 1 side platform; 1 island platform
- Tracks: 2
- Train operators: BLS AG
- Connections: PostAuto AG bus service

Construction
- Parking: Yes (113 spaces)
- Accessible: No

Other information
- Station code: 8507474 (GO)

Passengers
- 2023: 620 per weekday (BLS, SBB)

Services
Preceding station	BLS	Following station
Kandersteg towards Bern	RE1	Hohtenn towards Brig or Domodossola
Kandersteg towards Biel/Bienne	RE11 Weekends only	Hohtenn towards Brig
Location

Goppenstein is a railway station in the Swiss canton of Valais and municipality of Ferden. The station is located on the Lötschberg line of the BLS AG, just outside the southern portal of the Lötschberg tunnel. It takes its name from the nearby hamlet of Goppenstein.

== Services ==
As of the December 2024 timetable change, the following services stop at Goppenstein:

- RegioExpress:
  - hourly service to Bern and Brig, with most trains continuing from Brig to Domodossola.
  - daily service on weekends during the high season to Biel/Bienne and Brig.

The station is also the southern terminus of the BLS car carrying shuttle train to Kandersteg station via the Lötschberg tunnel, with trains running every 30 minutes. There is no road across the Lötschen Pass, under which the tunnel runs, and the nearest alternative road crossings lie many kilometres to the east and west.

A connecting PostAuto bus service runs through the Lötschental valley between Steg and Fafleralp. Up the valley towards Fafleralp this route runs hourly and serves the valley communities of Ferden, Kippel, Wiler and Blatten. Alternate buses continue down the valley to Gampel-Steg.
