= Wiler =

Wiler (Lötschen)
- Municipality
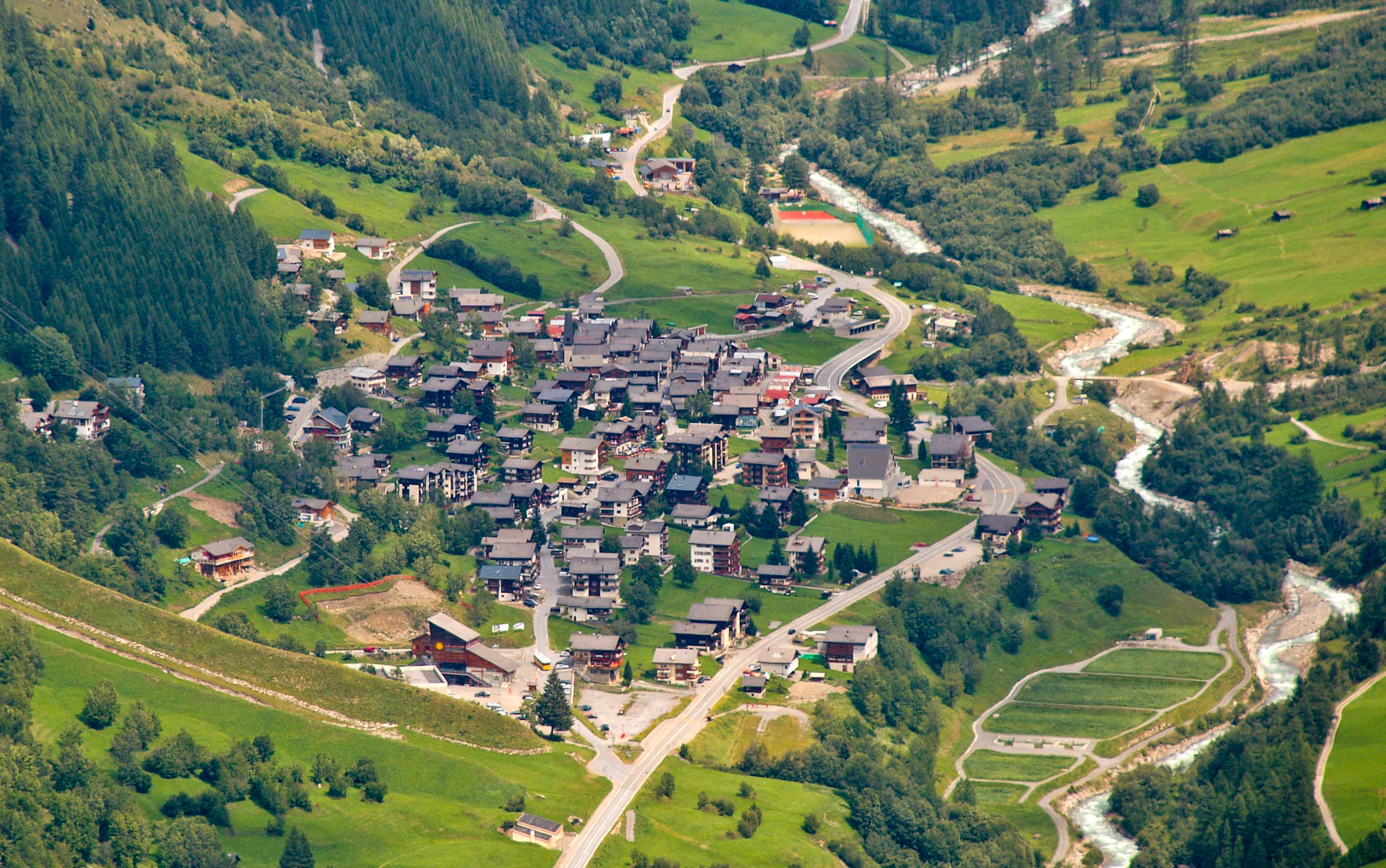

- Flag Coat of arms
- Location of Wiler (Lötschen)
- Location within Switzerland Location within Canton of Valais
- Coordinates: 46°23′N 7°46′E
- Country: Switzerland
- Canton: Valais
- District: Raron

Area
  - Total: 14.68 km^{2} (5.67 sq mi)
- Elevation: 1,421 m (4,662 ft)

Population (December 2002)
  - Total: 538
  - Density: 36.6/km^{2} (94.9/sq mi)
- Time zone: UTC+01:00 (CET)
  - Summer (DST): UTC+02:00 (CEST)
- Postal code: 3918
- SFOS number: 6202
- ISO 3166 code: CH-VS
- Surrounded by: Blatten (Lötschen), Kandersteg (BE), Kippel, Niedergesteln, Raron
- Website: https://www.wilervs.ch SFSO statistics

Wiler (Lötschen) is a municipality in the district of Raron in the canton of Valais in Switzerland.

== Geography ==
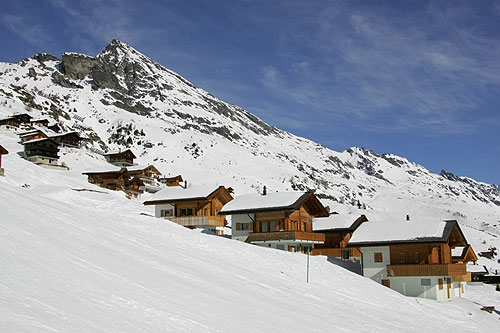
Lauchernalp

Wiler has an area, as of 2009, of 14.7 square kilometers (5.7 mi^{2}). Of this area, 2.83 km^{2} (1.09 mi^{2}) or 19.3% is used for agricultural purposes, while 3.4 km^{2} (1.3 mi^{2}) or 23.2% is forested. Of the rest of the land, 0.37 km^{2} (0.14 mi^{2}) or 2.5% is settled (buildings or roads), 0.14 km^{2} (35 acres) or 1.0% is either rivers or lakes and 7.95 km^{2} (3.07 mi^{2}) or 54.2% is unproductive land.

Of the built up area, housing and buildings made up 1.4% and transportation infrastructure made up 0.9%. Out of the forested land, 19.6% of the total land area is heavily forested and 2.5% is covered with orchards or small clusters of trees. Of the agricultural land, 0% is used for growing crops, 5.2% is pastures and 14.1% is used for alpine pastures. All the water in the municipality is flowing water. Of the unproductive areas, 13.6% is unproductive vegetation, 36.5% is too rocky for vegetation and 4.2% of the land is covered by glaciers.

== Coat of arms ==
The blazon of the municipal coat of arms is Argent, four Cynorrhodon Flowers Gules conjoined Or surrounded by a Garland and in base Coupeaux Vert.

== Demographics ==
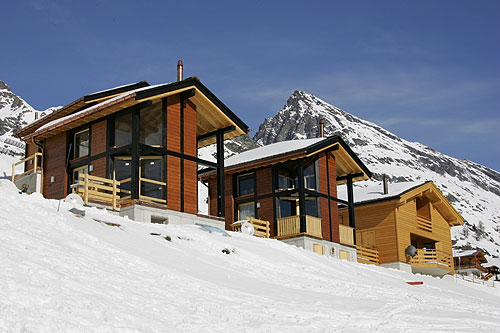
New houses at Launchernalp

Wiler has a population (as of December 2020) of 565. As of 2008, 5.1% of the population are resident foreign nationals. Over the last 10 years (2000–2010), the population has changed at a rate of 9.3%. It has changed at a rate of 2% due to migration and at a rate of 8.3% due to births and deaths.

Most of the population (as of 2000) speaks German (479 or 98.2%) as their first language, Serbo-Croatian is the second most common (4 or 0.8%) and Danish is the third (3 or 0.6%).

As of 2008, the population was made up of 522 Swiss citizens and 28 non-citizen residents (5.09% of the population). Of the population in the municipality, 355 or about 72.7% were born in Wiler and lived there in 2000. There were 97 or 19.9% who were born in the same canton, while 24 or 4.9% were born somewhere else in Switzerland, and 11 or 2.3% were born outside of Switzerland.

As of 2000, children and teenagers (0–19 years old) make up 21.5% of the population, while adults (20–64 years old) make up 65% and seniors (over 64 years old) make up 13.5%.

As of 2000, there were 229 people who were single and never married in the municipality. There were 224 married individuals, 28 widows or widowers and 7 individuals who are divorced.

As of 2000, there were 175 private households in the municipality, and an average of 2.8 persons per household. There were 36 households that consist of only one person and 20 households with five or more people. In 2000, a total of 173 apartments (30.6% of the total) were permanently occupied, while 342 apartments (60.5%) were seasonally occupied and 50 apartments (8.8%) were empty. As of 2009, the construction rate of new housing units was 16.3 new units per 1000 residents.

The historical population is given in the following chart:

== Politics ==
In the 2007 federal election, the most popular party was the CVP which received 71.3% of the vote. The next three most popular parties were the SVP (16.64%), the Green Party (5.29%) and the SP (4.16%). In the federal election, a total of 206 votes were cast, and the voter turnout was 52.0%.

== Economy ==
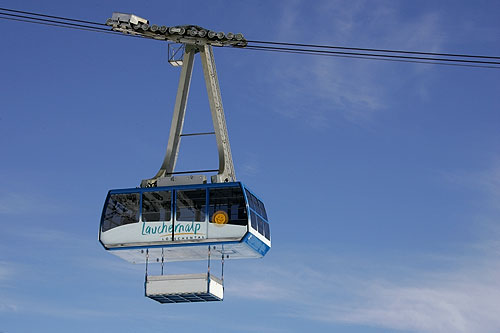
Cable car Wiler-Lauchernalp

As of 2010, Wiler had an unemployment rate of 1.3%. As of 2008, there were 54 people employed in the primary economic sector and about 19 businesses involved in this sector. 28 people were employed in the secondary sector and there were 8 businesses in this sector. 113 people were employed in the tertiary sector, with 28 businesses in this sector. There were 255 residents of the municipality who were employed in some capacity, of which females made up 34.9% of the workforce.

In 2008, the total number of full-time equivalent jobs was 141. The number of jobs in the primary sector was 28, of which 19 were in agriculture and 9 were in forestry or lumber production. The number of jobs in the secondary sector was 26 of which 3 or (11.5%) were in manufacturing and 23 (88.5%) were in construction. The number of jobs in the tertiary sector was 87. In the tertiary sector; 14 or 16.1% were in wholesale or retail sales or the repair of motor vehicles, 18 or 20.7% were in the movement and storage of goods, 30 or 34.5% were in a hotel or restaurant, 2 or 2.3% were the insurance or financial industry, 2 or 2.3% were technical professionals or scientists, 6 or 6.9% were in education and 2 or 2.3% were in health care.

In 2000, there were 46 workers who commuted into the municipality and 141 workers who commuted away. The municipality is a net exporter of workers, with about 3.1 workers leaving the municipality for every one entering. Of the working population, 23.1% used public transportation to get to work, and 42.4% used a private car.

== Transport ==
Wiler lies on the road up the Lötschental valley from Steg and Goppenstein. The road passes through Wiler village and reaches its end at Fafleralp. A PostAuto bus service runs along the road, connecting the municipality to Goppenstein railway station, with some buses continuing to Steg.

== Religion ==
From the 2000 census, 472 or 96.7% were Roman Catholic, while 13 or 2.7% belonged to the Swiss Reformed Church. 1 (or about 0.20% of the population) belonged to no church, are agnostic or atheist, and 2 individuals (or about 0.41% of the population) did not answer the question.

== Education ==
In Wiler about 216 or (44.3%) of the population have completed non-mandatory upper secondary education, and 26 or (5.3%) have completed additional higher education (either university or a Fachhochschule). Of the 26 who completed tertiary schooling, 88.5% were Swiss men, 11.5% were Swiss women.

As of 2000, there were 10 students in Wiler who came from another municipality, while 22 residents attended schools outside the municipality.
