= Lauchernalp =

Coordinates: 46°24′40″N 7°46′27″E

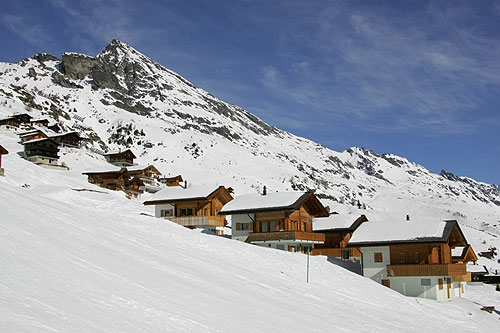
Lauchernalp in winter

Lauchernalp is an alp and resort area in the Swiss Alps, located in the canton of Valais. It sits on a sunny terrace, between 1,900 and 2,100 metres (6,200 and 6,900 ft) above sea level, overlooking the Lötschental above Wiler. Lauchernalp mainly belongs to the municipality of Wiler, with a small part belonging to the municipality of Kippel.

In winter the resort is car-free and can only be reached by cable car from Wiler. The cable car station is located at a height of 1,969 metres (6,460 ft). The ski area culminates at the Hockenhorngrat (east of the Hockenhorn) at 3,111 metres (10,207 ft).
