= Kippel =

- Municipality
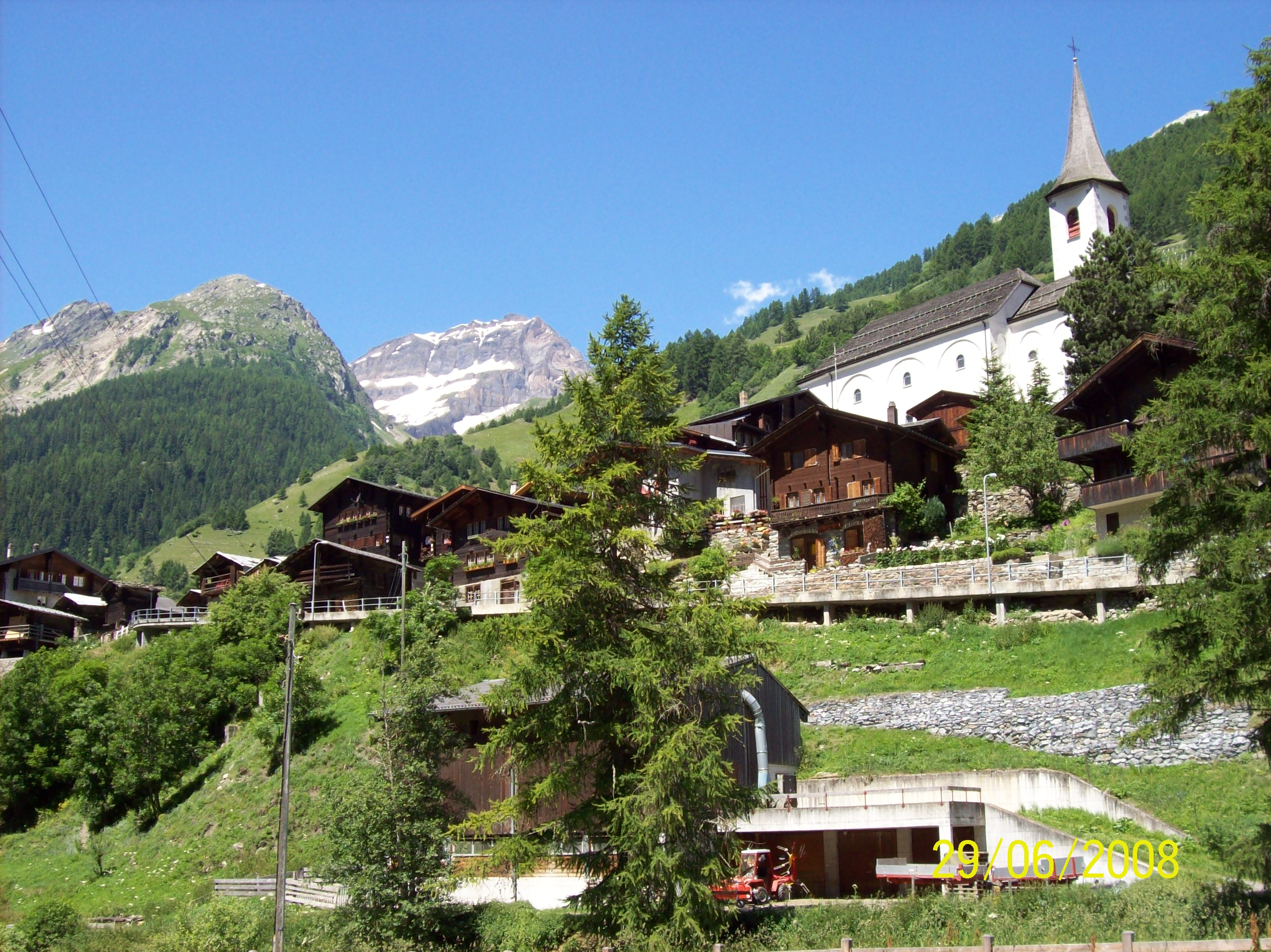

- Flag Coat of arms
- Location of Kippel
- Location within Switzerland Location within Canton of Valais
- Coordinates: 46°23′N 7°46′E
- Country: Switzerland
- Canton: Valais
- District: Raron

Government
  - Mayor: Bernhard Rieder

Area
  - Total: 11.7 km^{2} (4.5 sq mi)
- Elevation: 1,376 m (4,514 ft)

Population (December 2002)
  - Total: 383
  - Density: 32.7/km^{2} (84.8/sq mi)
- Time zone: UTC+01:00 (CET)
  - Summer (DST): UTC+02:00 (CEST)
- Postal code: 3917
- SFOS number: 6197
- ISO 3166 code: CH-VS
- Surrounded by: Ferden, Kandersteg (BE), Niedergesteln, Wiler (Lötschen)
- Website: www.kippel.ch

Kippel is a municipality in the district of Raron in the canton of Valais in Switzerland.

== History ==
Kippel is first mentioned in 1437 as Kypil.

== Geography ==
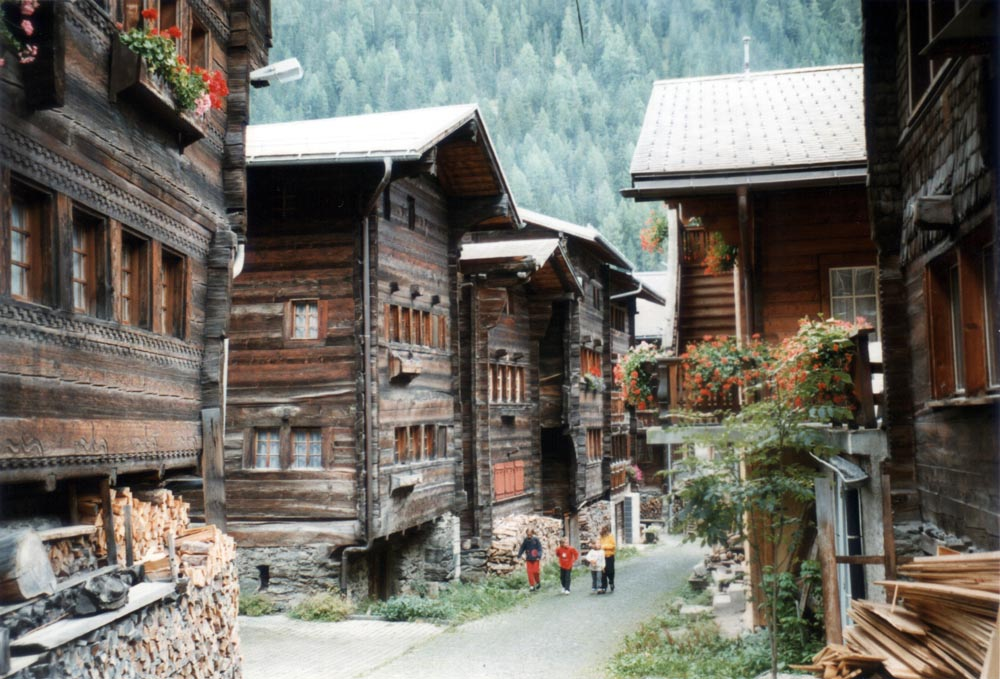
Kippel village

Kippel has an area, as of 2009, of 11.7 square kilometers (4.5 mi^{2}). Of this area, 2.73 km^{2} (1.05 mi^{2}) or 23.4% is used for agricultural purposes, while 4.12 km^{2} (1.59 mi^{2}) or 35.3% is forested. Of the rest of the land, 0.2 km^{2} (0.077 mi^{2}) or 1.7% is settled (buildings or roads), 0.09 km^{2} (22 acres) or 0.8% is either rivers or lakes and 4.53 km^{2} (1.75 mi^{2}) or 38.9% is unproductive land.

Of the built up area, housing and buildings made up 0.8% and transportation infrastructure made up 0.4%. Out of the forested land, 30.6% of the total land area is heavily forested and 3.9% is covered with orchards or small clusters of trees. Of the agricultural land, 5.8% is pastures and 17.6% is used for alpine pastures. Of the water in the municipality, 0.3% is in lakes and 0.4% is in rivers and streams. Of the unproductive areas, 13.9% is unproductive vegetation, 23.8% is too rocky for vegetation and 1.2% of the land is covered by glaciers.

The municipality is located in the Westlich Raron district, in the upper Lötschental valley. It is the largest of the villages of the Lötschental valley.

== Coat of arms ==
The blazon of the municipal coat of arms is Gules, a Saltire couped Argent between two Mullets of Five Or.

== Demographics ==
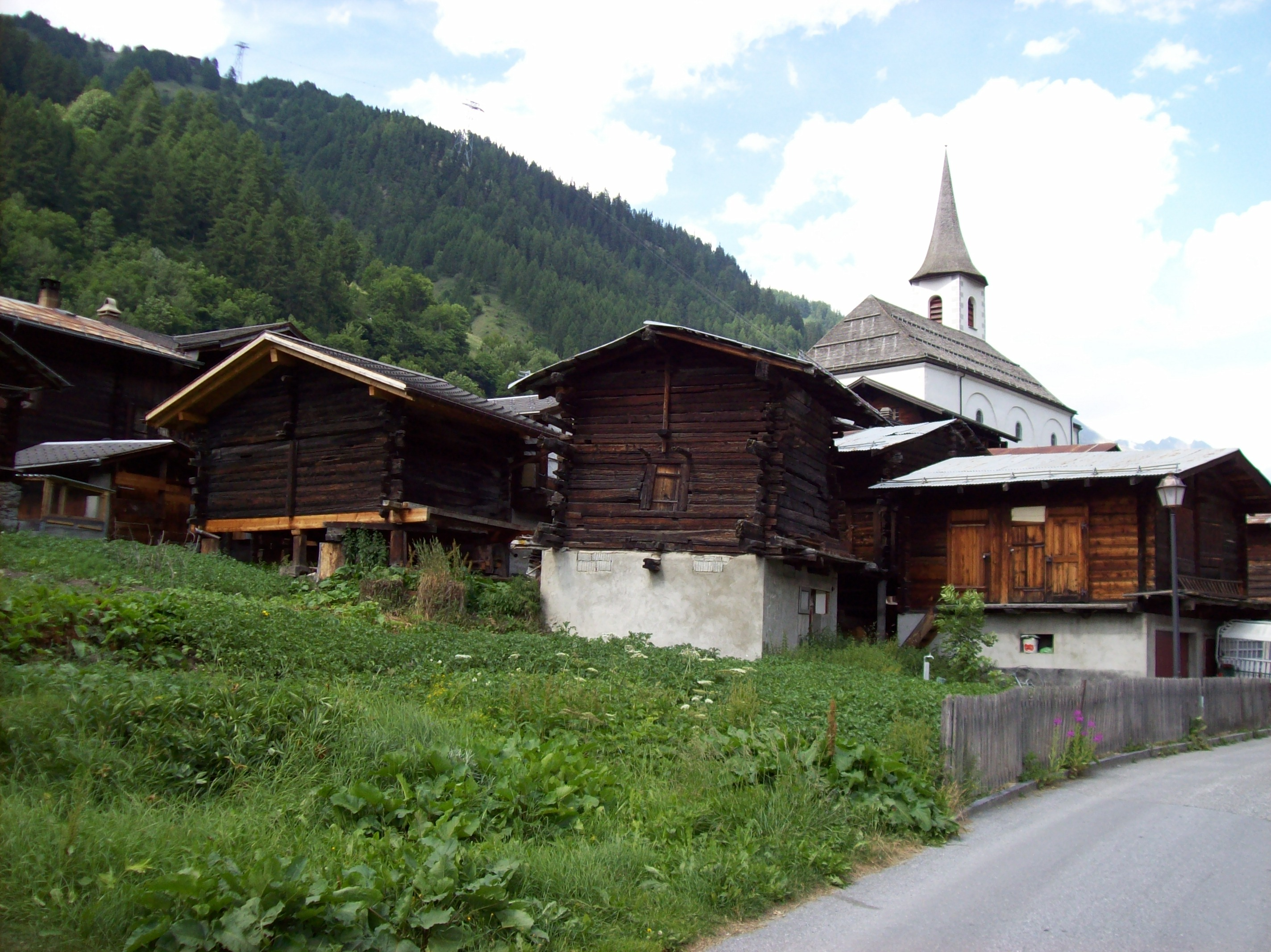
Kippel village

Kippel has a population (as of December 2020) of 310. As of 2008, 2.9% of the population are resident foreign nationals. Over the last 10 years (2000–2010) the population has changed at a rate of −2.4%. It has changed at a rate of −9.2% due to migration and at a rate of -0.5% due to births and deaths.

Most of the population (as of 2000) speaks German (365 or 99.2%) as their first language with the rest speaking French.

As of 2008, the population was 50.3% male and 49.7% female. The population was made up of 183 Swiss men (49.5% of the population) and 3 (0.8%) non-Swiss men. There were 177 Swiss women (47.8%) and 7 (1.9%) non-Swiss women. Of the population in the municipality, 259 or about 70.4% were born in Kippel and lived there in 2000. There were 82 or 22.3% who were born in the same canton, while 19 or 5.2% were born somewhere else in Switzerland, and 7 or 1.9% were born outside of Switzerland.

As of 2000, children and teenagers (0–19 years old) make up 22.3% of the population, while adults (20–64 years old) make up 57.6% and seniors (over 64 years old) make up 20.1%.

As of 2000, there were 177 people who were single and never married in the municipality. There were 161 married individuals, 29 widows or widowers and 1 individuals who are divorced.

As of 2000, there were 134 private households in the municipality, and an average of 2.6 persons per household. There were 36 households that consist of only one person and 13 households with five or more people. In 2000, a total of 134 apartments (53.0% of the total) were permanently occupied, while 89 apartments (35.2%) were seasonally occupied and 30 apartments (11.9%) were empty. The vacancy rate for the municipality, in 2010, was 2.65%.

The historical population is given in the following chart:

== Sights ==
The entire village of Kippel is designated as part of the Inventory of Swiss Heritage Sites.

== Politics ==
In the 2007 federal election the most popular party was the CVP which received 72.19% of the vote. The next three most popular parties were the SP (11.72%), the SVP (10.89%) and the Green Party (2.39%). In the federal election, a total of 191 votes were cast, and the voter turnout was 60.8%.

In the 2009 Conseil d'État/Staatsrat election a total of 223 votes were cast, of which 9 or about 4.0% were invalid. The voter participation was 76.9%, which is much more than the cantonal average of 54.67%. In the 2007 Swiss Council of States election a total of 190 votes were cast, of which 16 or about 8.4% were invalid. The voter participation was 61.9%, which is similar to the cantonal average of 59.88%.

== Economy ==
As of 2010, Kippel had an unemployment rate of 0.9%. As of 2008, there were 9 people employed in the primary economic sector and about 5 businesses involved in this sector. 1 person was employed in the secondary sector and there was 1 business in this sector. 90 people were employed in the tertiary sector, with 16 businesses in this sector. There were 191 residents of the municipality who were employed in some capacity, of which females made up 42.4% of the workforce.

In 2008 the total number of full-time equivalent jobs was 74. The number of jobs in the primary sector was 3, all of which were in agriculture. The number of jobs in the secondary sector was 1, in construction. The number of jobs in the tertiary sector was 70. In the tertiary sector; 9 or 12.9% were in wholesale or retail sales or the repair of motor vehicles, 18 or 25.7% were in the movement and storage of goods, 15 or 21.4% were in a hotel or restaurant, 2 or 2.9% were the insurance or financial industry and 20 or 28.6% were in health care.

In 2000, there were 35 workers who commuted into the municipality and 113 workers who commuted away. The municipality is a net exporter of workers, with about 3.2 workers leaving the municipality for every one entering. Of the working population, 16.8% used public transportation to get to work, and 34.6% used a private car.

== Transport ==
Kippel lies on the road up the Lötschental valley from Steg and Goppenstein. The road passes through Kippel village and reaches its end at Fafleralp. A PostAuto bus service runs along the road, connecting the municipality to Goppenstein railway station, with some buses continuing to Steg.

== Religion ==
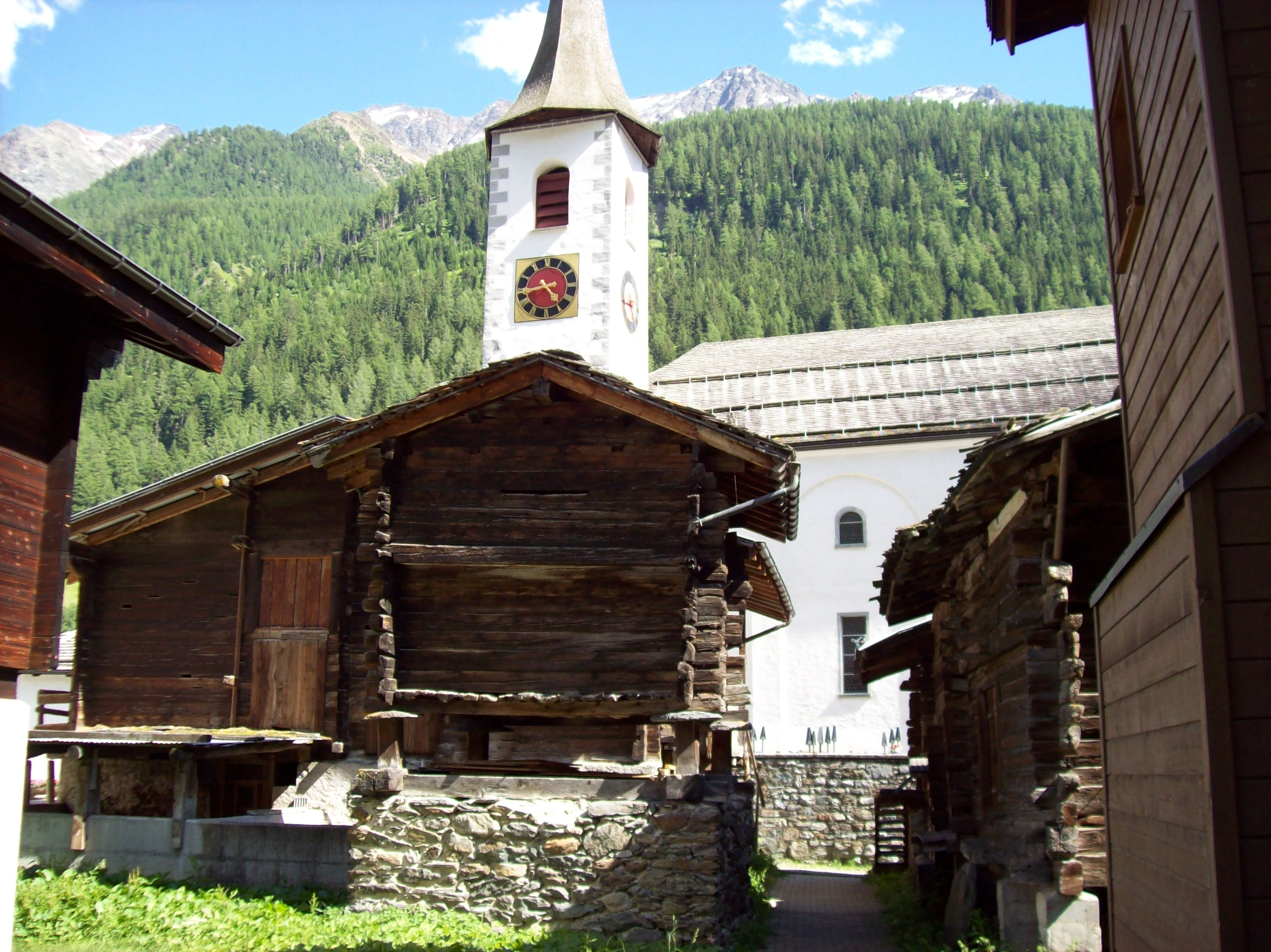
Kippel village church

From the 2000 census, 361 or 98.1% were Roman Catholic, while 6 or 1.6% belonged to the Swiss Reformed Church. 1 person belonged to no church, was agnostic or atheist.

== Education ==
In Kippel about 143 or (38.9%) of the population have completed non-mandatory upper secondary education, and 23 or (6.3%) have completed additional higher education (either university or a Fachhochschule). Of the 23 who completed tertiary schooling, 73.9% were Swiss men, 21.7% were Swiss women.

As of 2000, there were 40 students in Kippel who came from another municipality, while 22 residents attended schools outside the municipality.
