= Kandersteg railway station =

Railway station in Kandersteg, Switzerland

Kandersteg
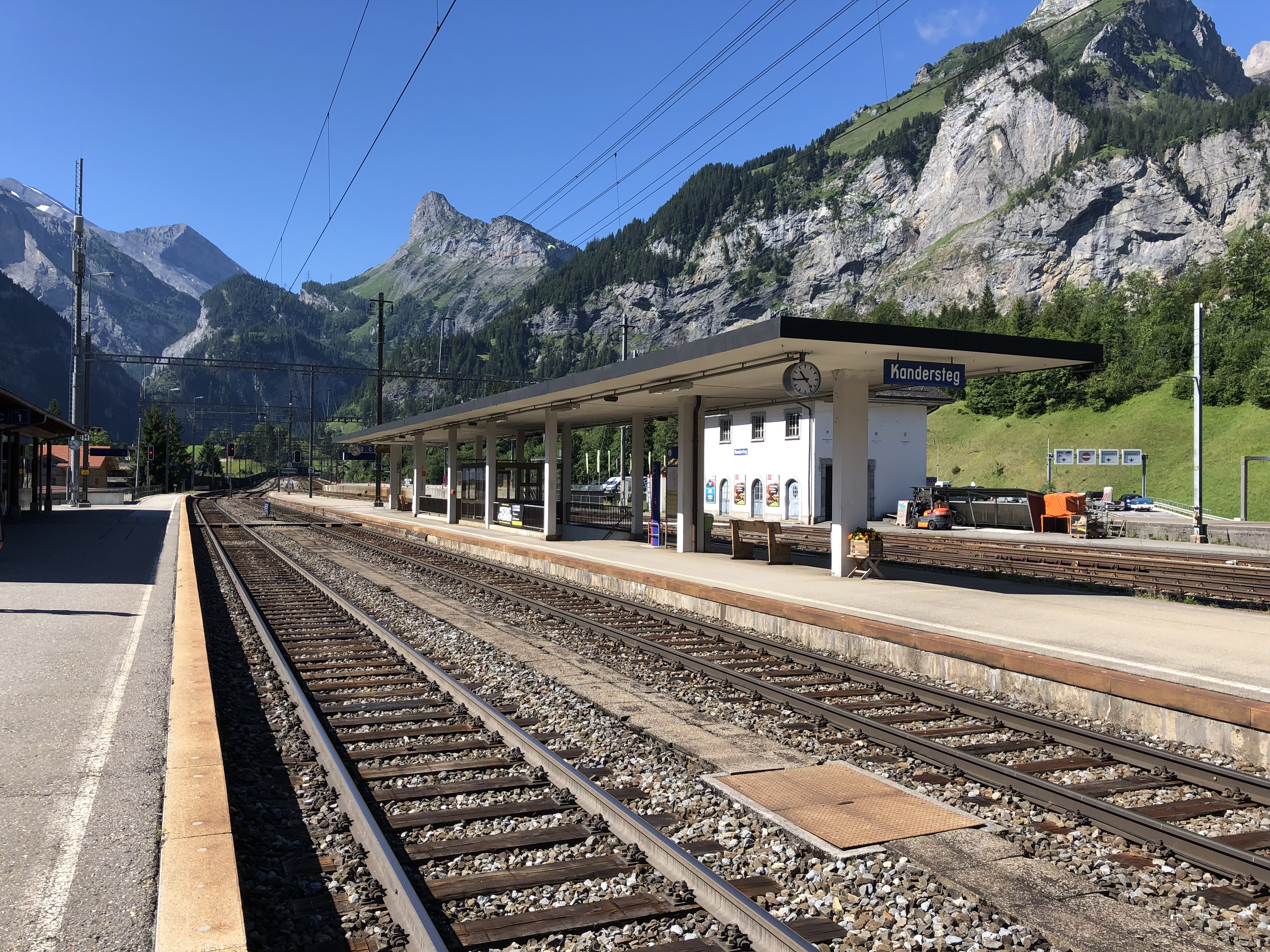
- The station platforms in 2019

General information
- Location: Bahnhofstrasse; Kandersteg, Canton of Bern; Switzerland
- Coordinates: 46°29′43″N 7°40′17″E
- Elevation: 1,176 m (3,858 ft)
- Owner: BLS AG
- Line: Lötschberg line
- Distance: 31.6 km (19.6 mi) from Spiez
- Platforms: 2: 1 side platform; 1 island platform
- Tracks: 2 (for passenger use)
- Train operators: BLS AG
- Connections: Automobilverkehr Frutigen-Adelboden bus services; Busbetrieb Kandersteg - Gasterntal bus service

Construction
- Parking: Yes (100 spaces)
- Accessible: No

Other information
- Station code: 8507475 (KA)
- Fare zone: 833 (Libero)

Passengers
- 2023: 1'200 per weekday (BLS, SBB)

Services
Preceding station	BLS	Following station
Frutigen towards Bern	RE1	Goppenstein towards Brig or Domodossola
Frutigen towards Biel/Bienne	RE11 Weekends only	Goppenstein towards Brig
Location
- Location within Switzerland Location within Canton of Bern

Kandersteg is a railway station in the Swiss canton of Bern and municipality of Kandersteg. The station is located on the Lötschberg line of the BLS AG, and is the first station to the north of the Lötschberg tunnel.

== Services ==
As of the December 2024 timetable change, the following services stop at Kandersteg:

- RegioExpress:
  - hourly service to Bern and Brig, with most trains continuing from Brig to Domodossola.
  - daily service on weekends during the high season to Biel/Bienne and Brig.

The station is also the northern terminus of the BLS car carrying shuttle train to Goppenstein station via the Lötschberg tunnel, with trains running every 30 minutes. There is no road across the Lötschen Pass, under which the tunnel runs, and the nearest alternative road crossings lie many kilometres to the east and west.

The station is also served by Automobilverkehr Frutigen-Adelboden bus services to Mitholz, Blausee, Kandergrund and Frutigen, to Sunnbühl and Busbetrieb Kandersteg - Gasterntal bus services to Selden in the Gastertal.

== Gallery ==
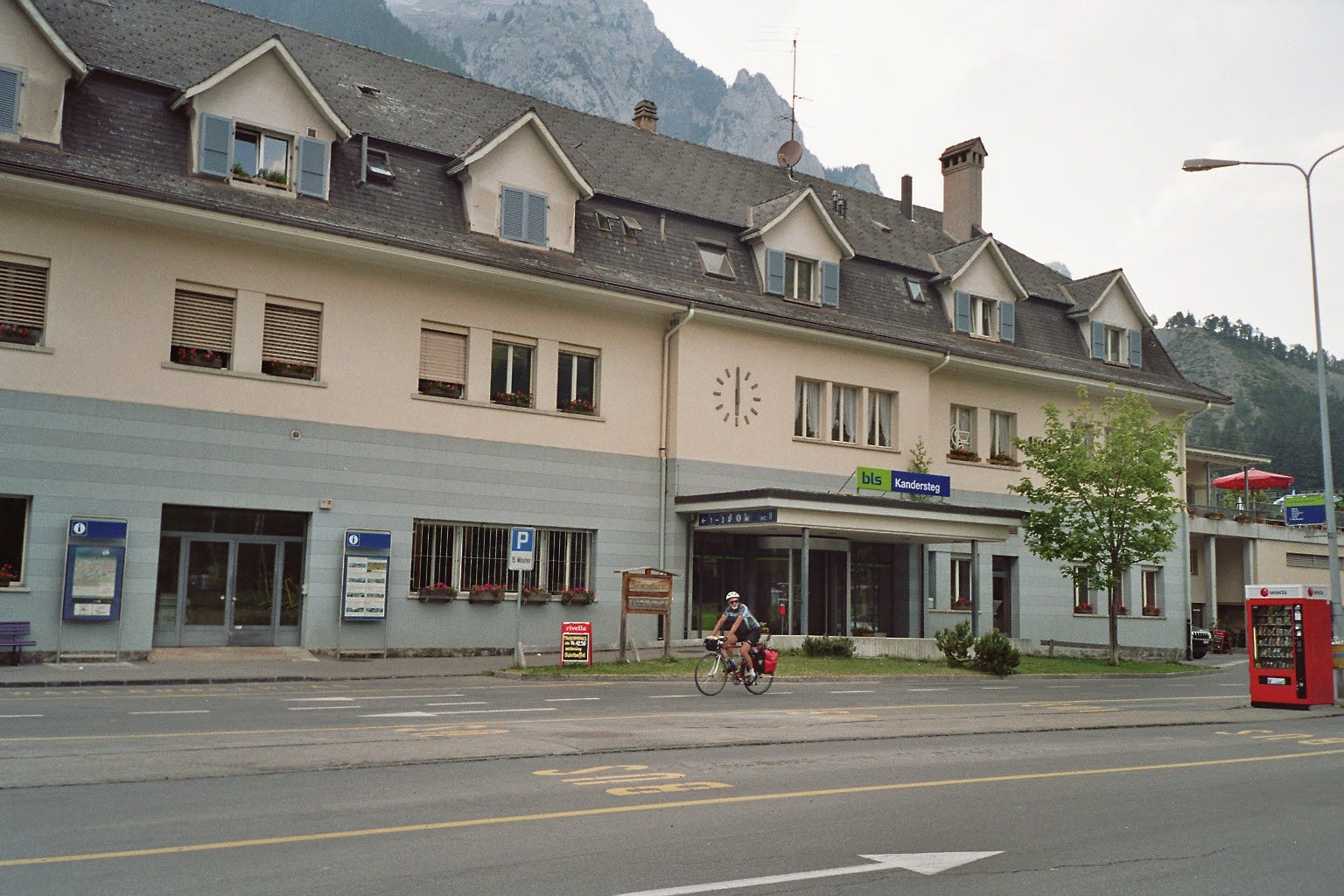
The station from the street

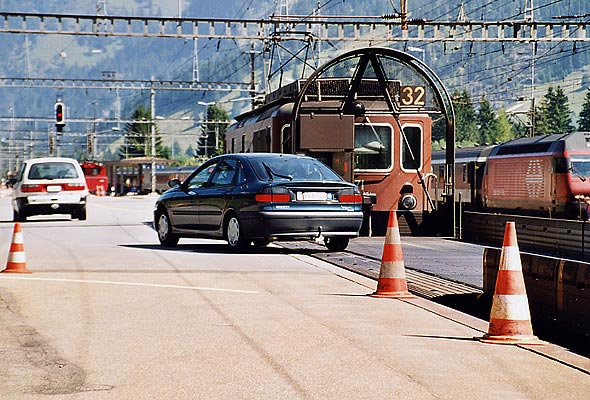
Unloading the car shuttle

== See also ==
- Rail transport in Switzerland
