= Lötschberg Tunnel =

Railway tunnel through the Bernese Alps

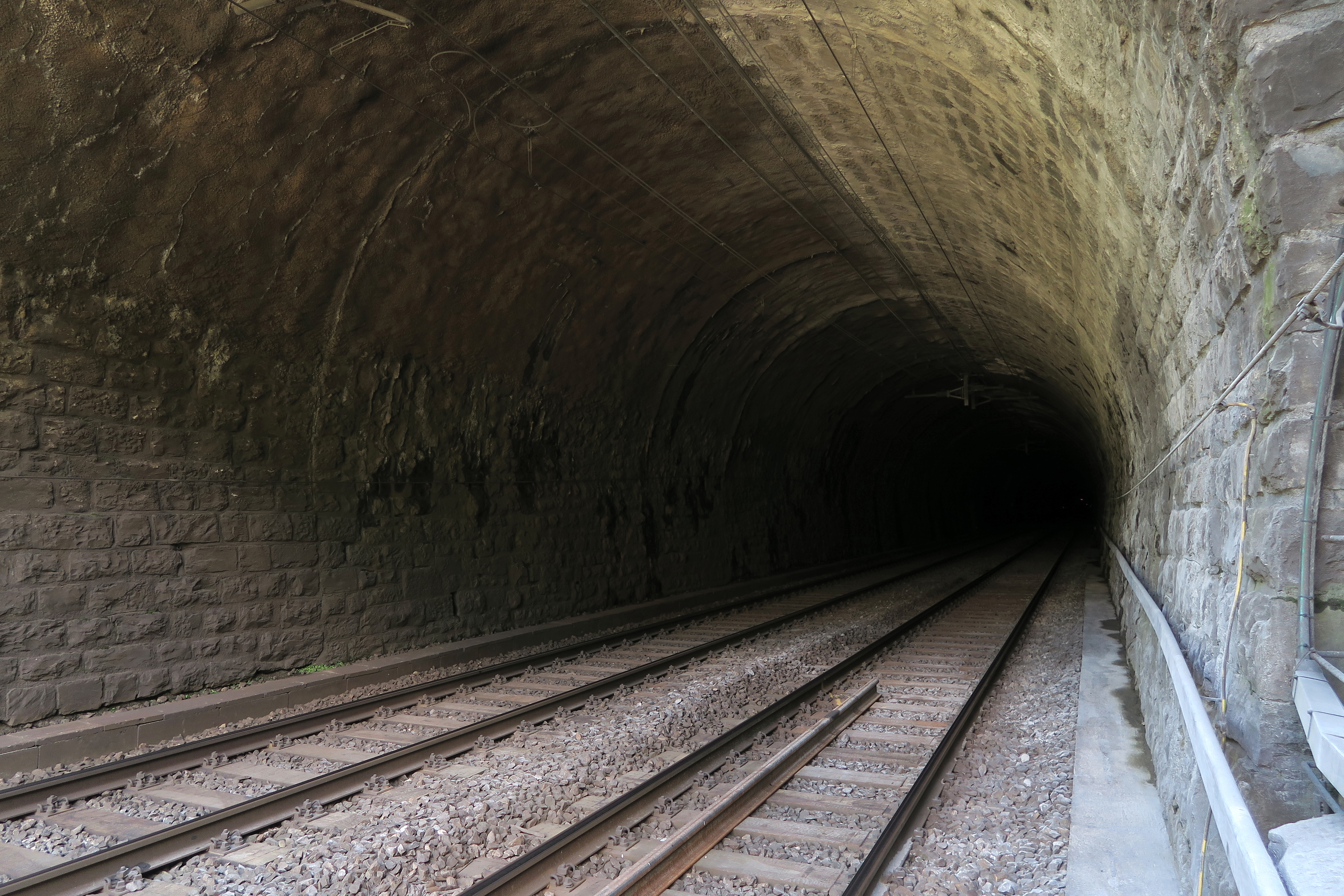
- The Lötschberg Tunnel from the north portal

Overview
- Official name: German: Lötschberg Tunnel
- Line: Lötschberg Line
- Location: Circumventing the Lötschen Pass in the Bernese Alps in Switzerland (Canton of Bern, canton of Valais)
- Coordinates: 46.369°N 7.754°E – 46.478°N 7.667°E
- System: BLS, SBB CFF FFS
- Start: Kandersteg, canton of Bern, 1,200 m (3,900 ft)
- End: Goppenstein, canton of Valais, 1,216 m (3,990 ft)

Operation
- Work began: 7 March 1907
- Opened: 15 July 1913
- Owner: BLS NETZ AG
- Operator: BLS
- Traffic: Railway
- Character: Passenger, Freight, Car Transport

Technical
- Length: 14.612 km (9.079 mi)
- No. of tracks: One double-track
- Track gauge: 1,435 mm (4 ft 8 1/2 in) (standard gauge)
- Electrified: 15 kV 16.7 Hz
- Max elevation: 1,239.54 m (4,066.7 ft)
- Min elevation: 1,200 m (3,900 ft) (north portal)
- Grade: 3–7 ‰

Route map

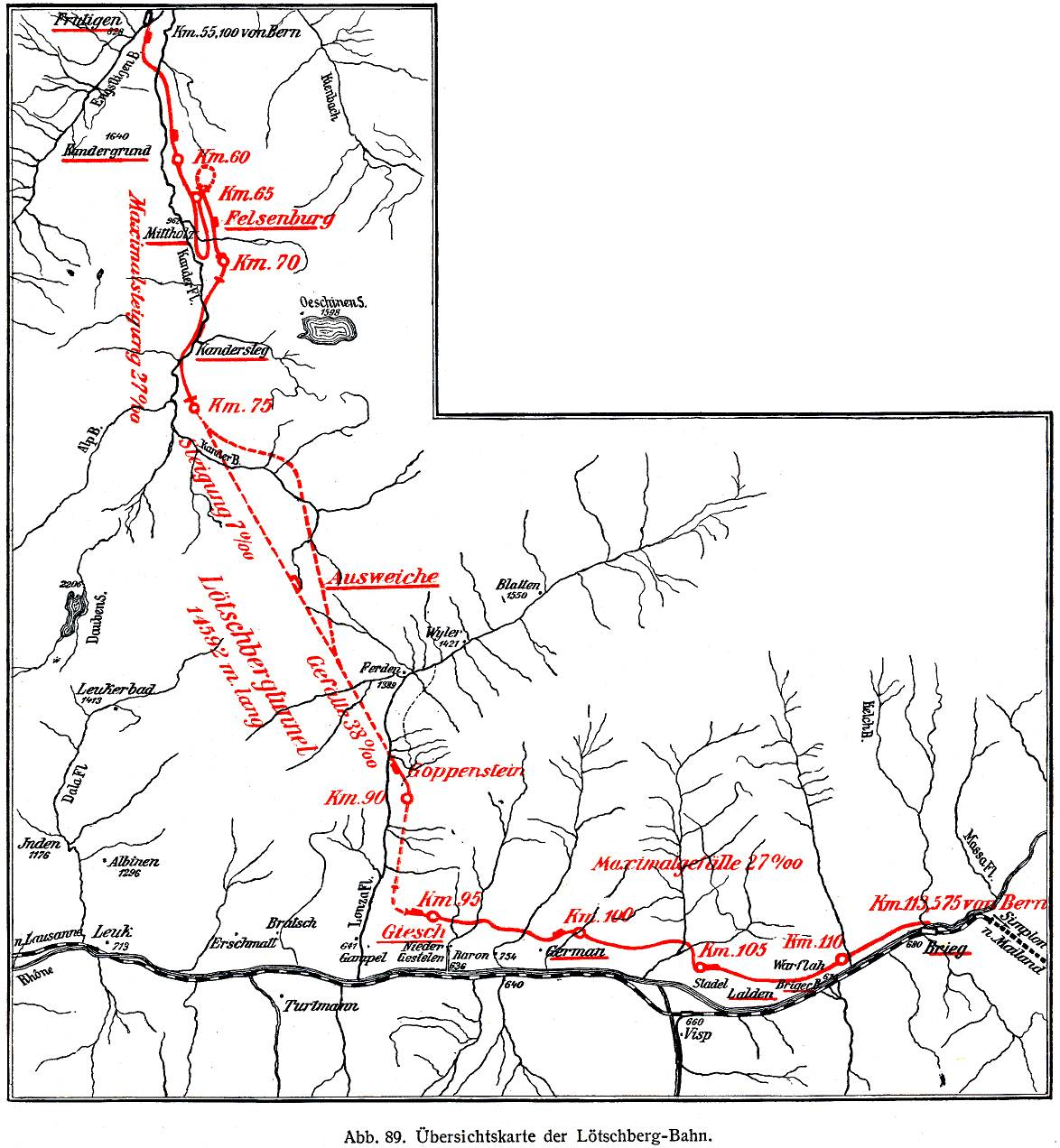
The Lötschberg Tunnel in the outline of the Lötschberg Line showing the planned straight and realized curved tunnel between km 75 and 90. Positions are indicated in travel distance from Bern in [km].

The Lötschberg Tunnel is a 14.61-kilometre-long (9.08 mi) railway tunnel on the Lötschberg Line, which connects Spiez and Brig at the northern end of the Simplon Tunnel, cutting through the Bernese Alps of Switzerland. Its ends are at the towns of Kandersteg (2 km away) in the canton of Bern and Goppenstein in the canton of Valais. The top elevation of the tunnel is 1,240 m (4,070 ft) above sea level—this is the highest point of the main Swiss railway network.

Construction began in 1907 and suffered delays by several severe accidents.

- February 1908: An avalanche destroyed a hotel that the workers lived in, killing 13.
- July 1908: The tunnel broke into a deep fissure below the Gastern Valley and flooded with water and glacial deposit from the fissure, killing 25, and 1,554 metres (5,098 ft) of the tunnel had to be abandoned and sealed off and replaced by a curved bypass.
- March 1911: Breakthrough was achieved
- 3 June 1913: Finalization
- 15 July 1913: Regular service began.

The tunnel is a single-bore twin track.

The BLS AG company offers a car-transport service through the tunnel, between Kandersteg station and Goppenstein station, for accompanied vehicles. The journey time is approximately 20 minutes; passengers remain in their cars in open-sided car-transport vehicles. At peak times, the car-transport service operates in each direction every 7½ minutes.

The new Lötschberg Base Tunnel, opened on June 15, 2007, has been constructed some 400 m (1,312 ft) below the level of the current Lötschberg Tunnel as part of the NRLA (New Railway Link through the Alps) project.

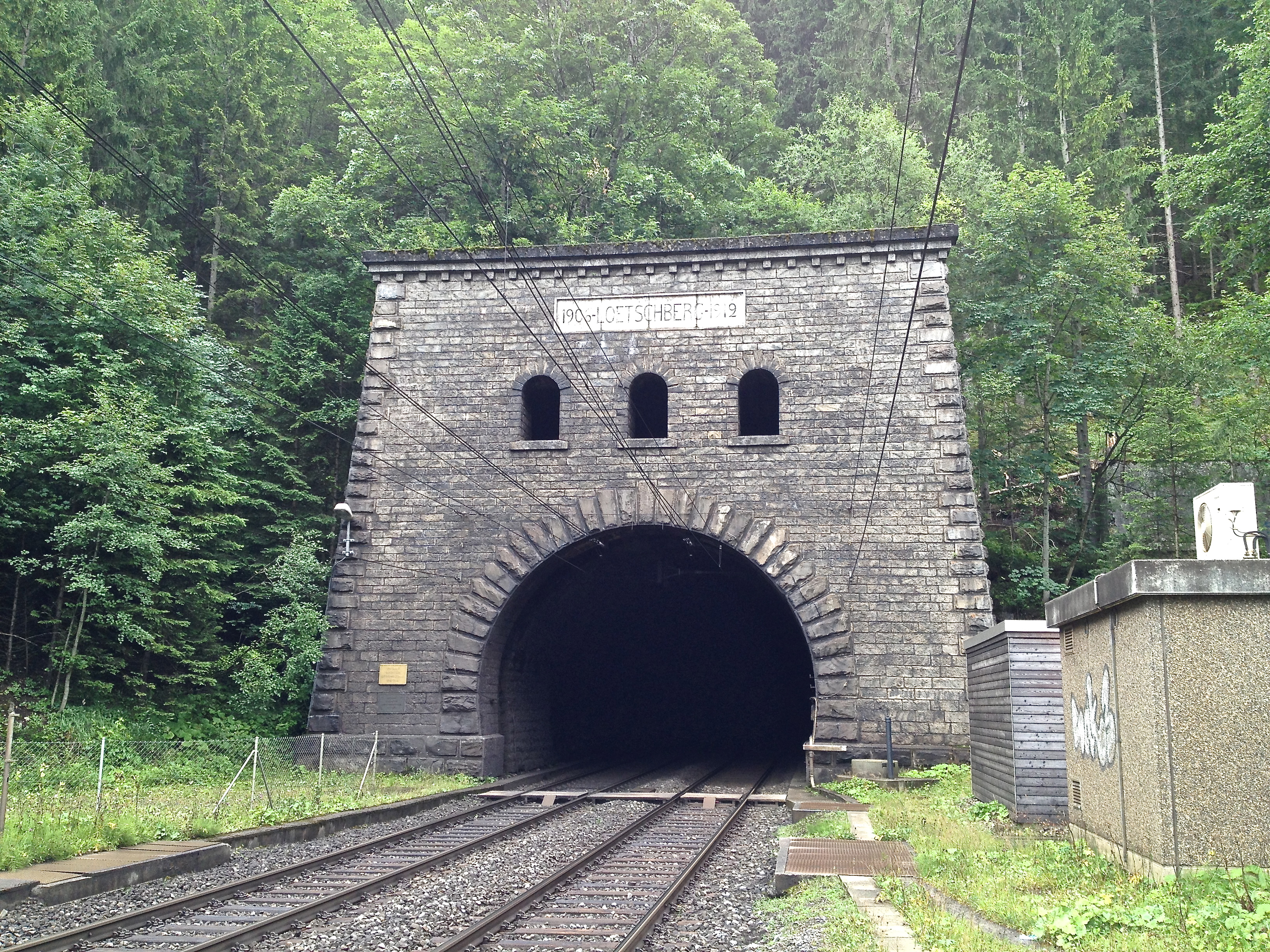
North portal south of Kandersteg (1200 m a.s.l.)

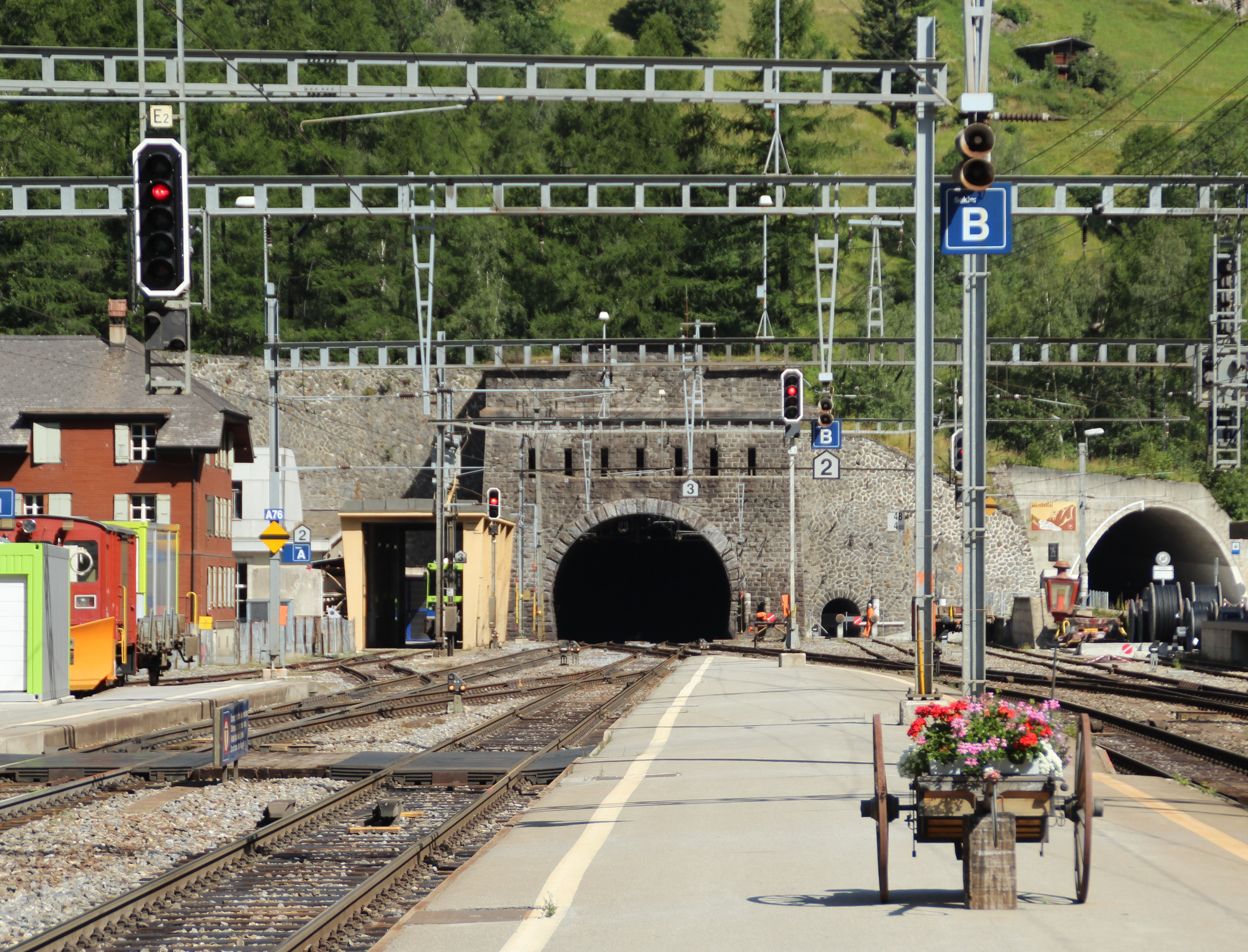
South portal from Goppenstein (1216 m a.s.l.)

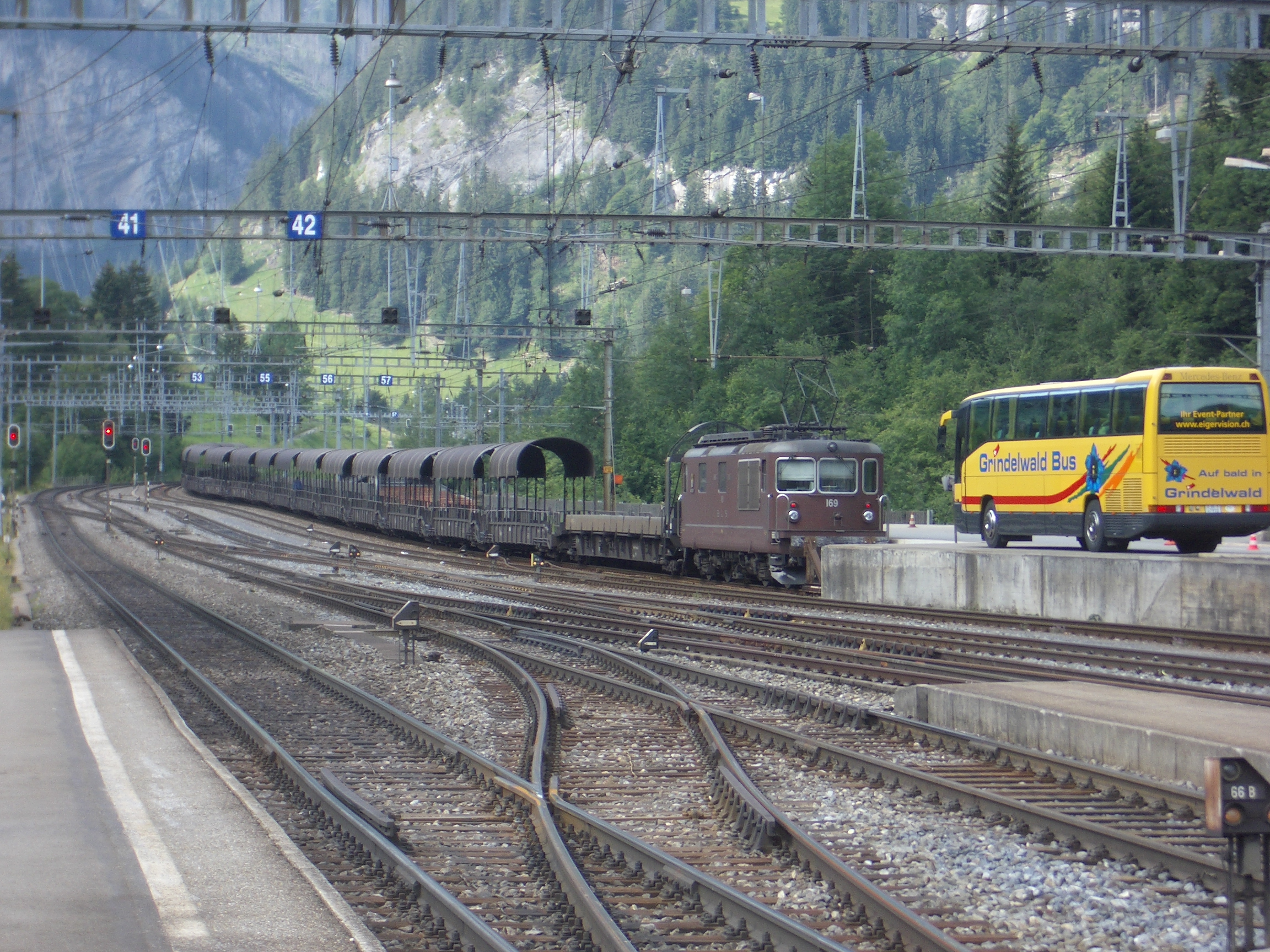
Car transport through the Lötschberg tunnel (Kandersteg)

== See also ==
- Lötschberg
- Lötschberg Base Tunnel
- Simplon Tunnel
- NRLA
