= Goppenstein =

Hamlet in Valais, Switzerland

Coordinates: 46°22′06″N 7°45′20″E

Goppenstein (1,216 m) is a Swiss hamlet in the canton of Valais, located in the lower Lötschental and traversed by the Lonza river. It belongs to the municipality of Ferden.

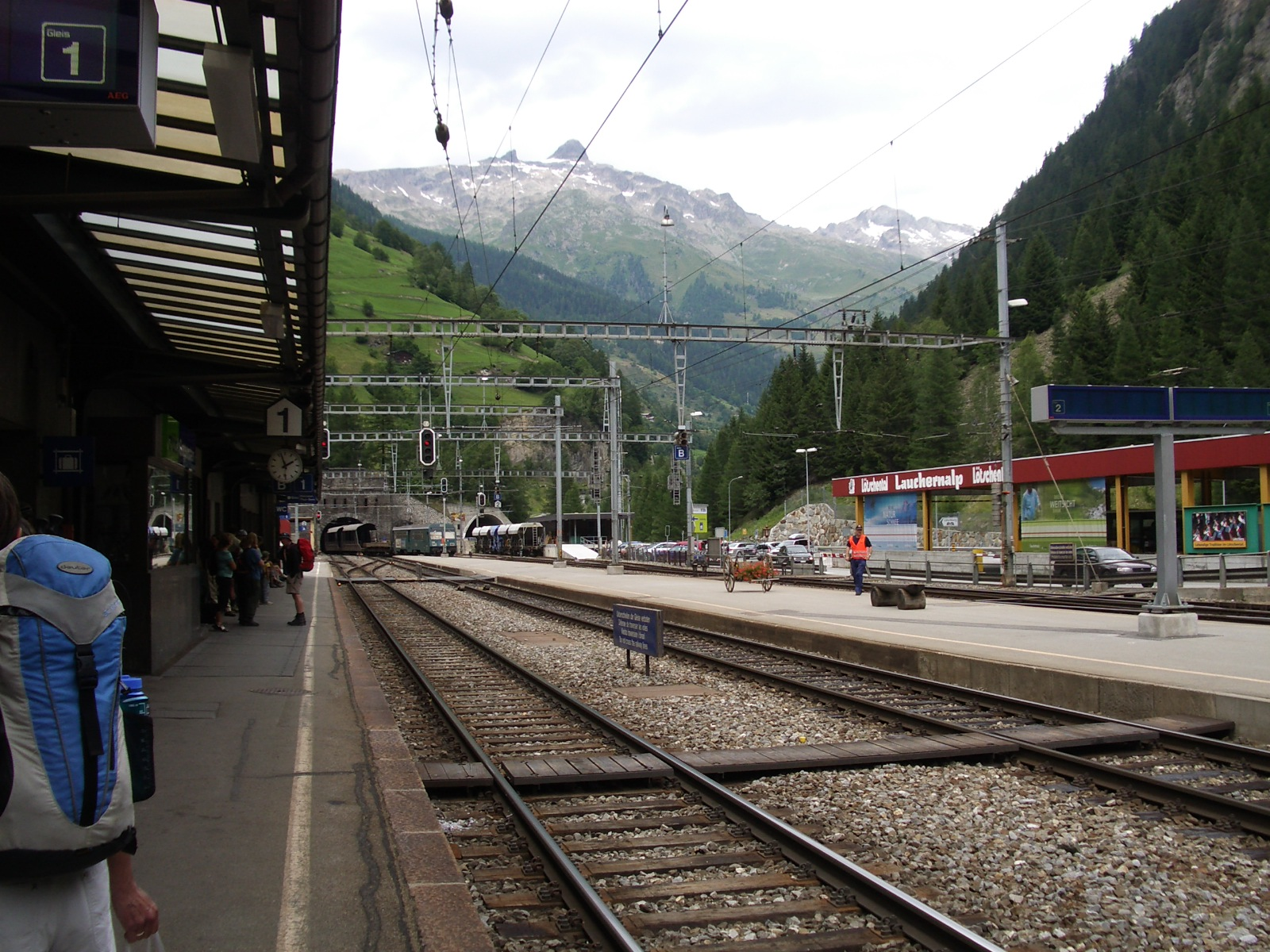
Goppenstein

Goppenstein is mainly known for its railway station on the Lötschberg railway line, at the southern entrance of the Lötschberg Tunnel leading to Kandersteg. Road vehicles can be carried through the tunnel to Kandersteg by open sided car shuttle trains.
