= Blatten (Lötschen) =

Village and municipality in Valais, Switzerland

- Municipality
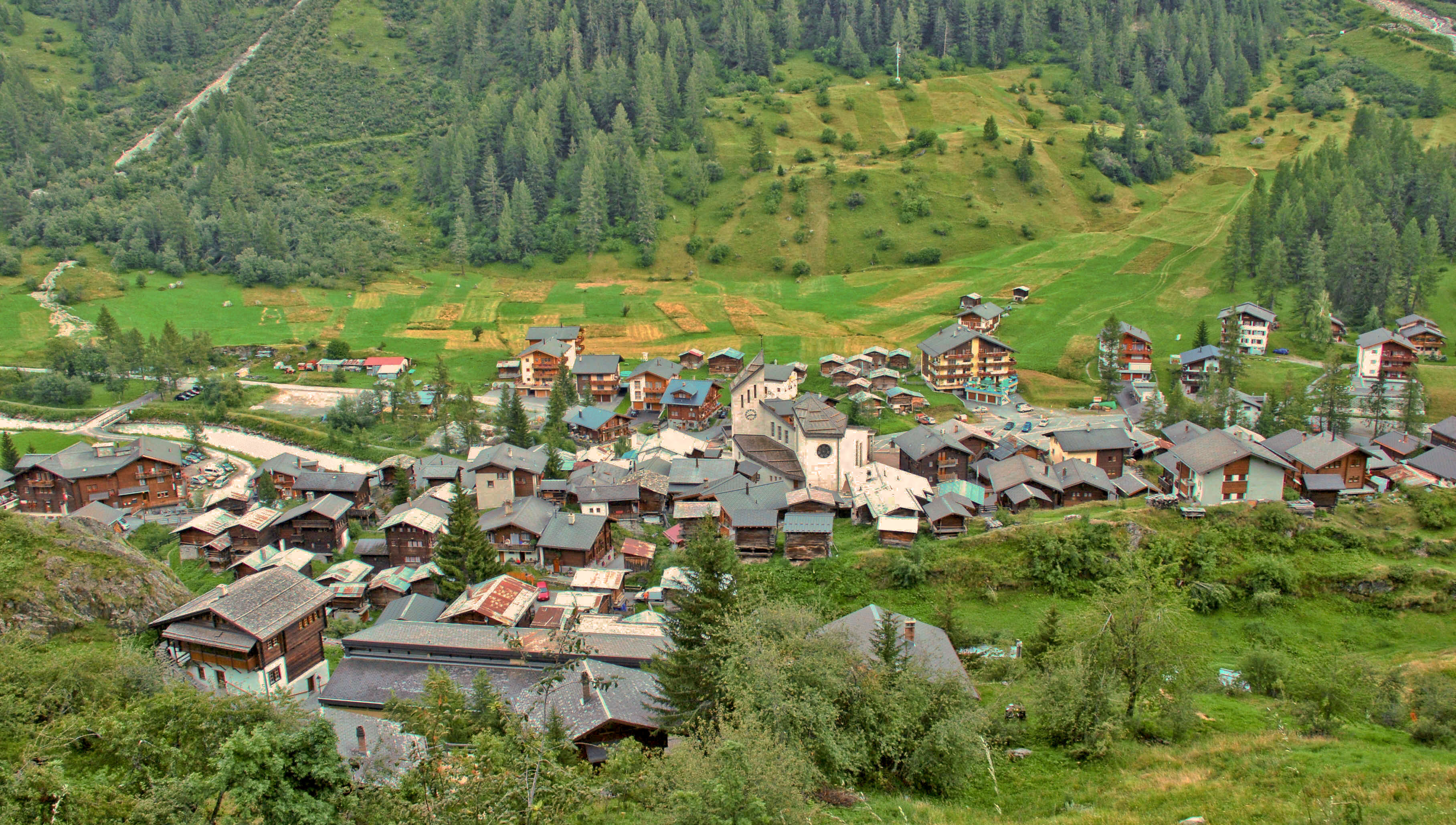

- Flag Coat of arms
- Location of Blatten
- Location within Switzerland Location within Canton of Valais
- Coordinates: 46°25′13″N 7°49′11″E
- Country: Switzerland
- Canton: Valais
- District: Westlich Raron

Government
  - Mayor: Matthias Bellwald

Area
  - Total: 90.7 km^{2} (35.0 sq mi)
- Elevation: 1,542 m (5,059 ft)

Population (December 2023)
  - Total: 303
  - Density: 3.34/km^{2} (8.65/sq mi)
- Time zone: UTC+01:00 (CET)
  - Summer (DST): UTC+02:00 (CEST)
- Postal code: 3919
- SFOS number: 6192
- ISO 3166 code: CH-VS
- Surrounded by: Baltschieder, Fieschertal, Kandersteg (BE), Lauterbrunnen (BE), Naters, Raron, Wiler (Lötschen)
- Website: blatten-vs.ch

Blatten (German pronunciation: [ˈblatn̩]) is a village and municipality in the Lötschental in the canton of Valais, Switzerland, which was almost entirely destroyed by a cataclysmic landslide caused by a glacier collapse on 28 May 2025. It is part of the district of Westlich Raron, and much of its area lies within the Jungfrau-Aletsch protected area, a World Heritage Site. In addition to the main village of Blatten, the municipality includes the settlements of Eisten, Fafleralp, Ried and Weissenried.

The Belalp ski resort and village of Blatten bei Naters lie some 15 kilometres (9.3 mi) to the south-east in a direct line, or about 50 kilometres (31 mi) by road.

== History ==
Blatten was first mentioned in a deed of 1343 as uffen der Blatten.

The Fafleralp above the village area has been a tourist attraction since 1910.

The village was connected by paved road in 1954 and thenceforth residents turned more and more to jobs in the industrial and service sectors and the population also declined somewhat.

=== 2025 glacier collapse ===
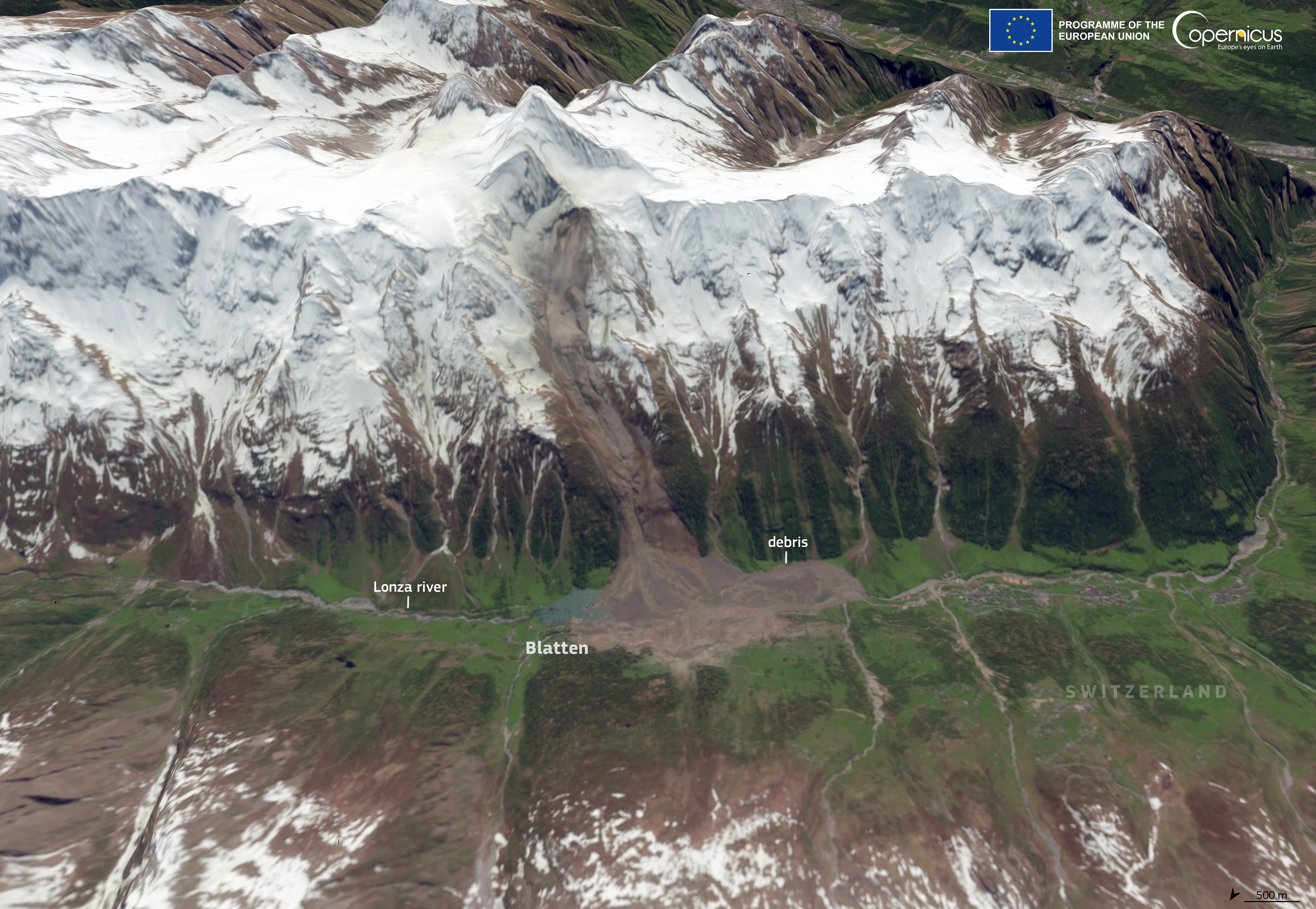
Satellite view of the landslide at Blatten, imaged on 30 May 2025

On 28 May 2025, at 15:24 CEST, approximately 90% of Blatten was destroyed by a landslide due to the collapse of the Birch glacier. The glacier collapsed because a prior rockfall from the Klein Nesthorn mountain had brought down over 10 million tons of weight onto the glacier, massively increasing pressure and stress on the ice. A seismic signal equivalent to a magnitude 3.1 earthquake was recorded at the moment of the landslide. An area approximately 2 km (1.2 mi) long, 200 m (660 ft) wide, and 200 m (660 ft) deep was buried by the debris cone, extending on both sides of the valley.

An estimated 10 million cubic metres (350×10^{6} cu ft) of ice, earth, and rock blocked the Lonza River, forming a lake. Smaller landslides in the preceding weeks had led to the partial evacuation of the village on 17 May 2025 and then a full evacuation of the remaining residents on 19 May 2025, thus preventing mass loss of life. A shepherd tending to his sheep was reported to be missing and later confirmed to have perished.

=== Reconstruction plans ===
A "New Blatten" working group was established by the local government. As reconstruction at the current site was complicated due to the sheer volume of debris and difficulty of removing it and disposing of it elsewhere, consideration was also being given to rebuilding at another location in the Lötschental. However, following contributions from the public, the canton, and the federal government, clean up of the site had begun by later in 2025.

== Geography ==
Blatten lies in the Lötschental south of the Bernese Alps. The municipality is located in the Westlich Raron district and is the highest inhabited part of the Lötschental at an elevation of 1,540 m (5,050 ft). It consists of the village of Blatten and the hamlets of Eisten, Ried and Weissenried. At the head of the road up the valley, Fafleralp is the site of a well-known hotel.

The Jungfrau-Aletsch protected area includes most of the municipality, although excluding the main settlements. At the head of the Lötschental, the Lötschenlücke pass, into the valley of the Aletsch Glacier, forms the municipal boundary. Below this pass, the Langgletscher occupies the Lötschental valley, whilst the Schwarzsee lies at a lower level. The valley is framed by the Tschingelhorn to the north and the Bietschhorn to the south, and the slopes of both mountains lie within the municipality.

Blatten has an area, as of 2011, of 90.7 square kilometers (35.0 mi^{2}). Of this area, 9.5% is used for agricultural purposes, while 9.0% is forested. Of the rest of the land, 0.4% is settled (buildings or roads) and 81.1% is unproductive land.

The entire village of Blatten and the hamlets of Eisten and Weissenried are designated as part of the Inventory of Swiss Heritage Sites.

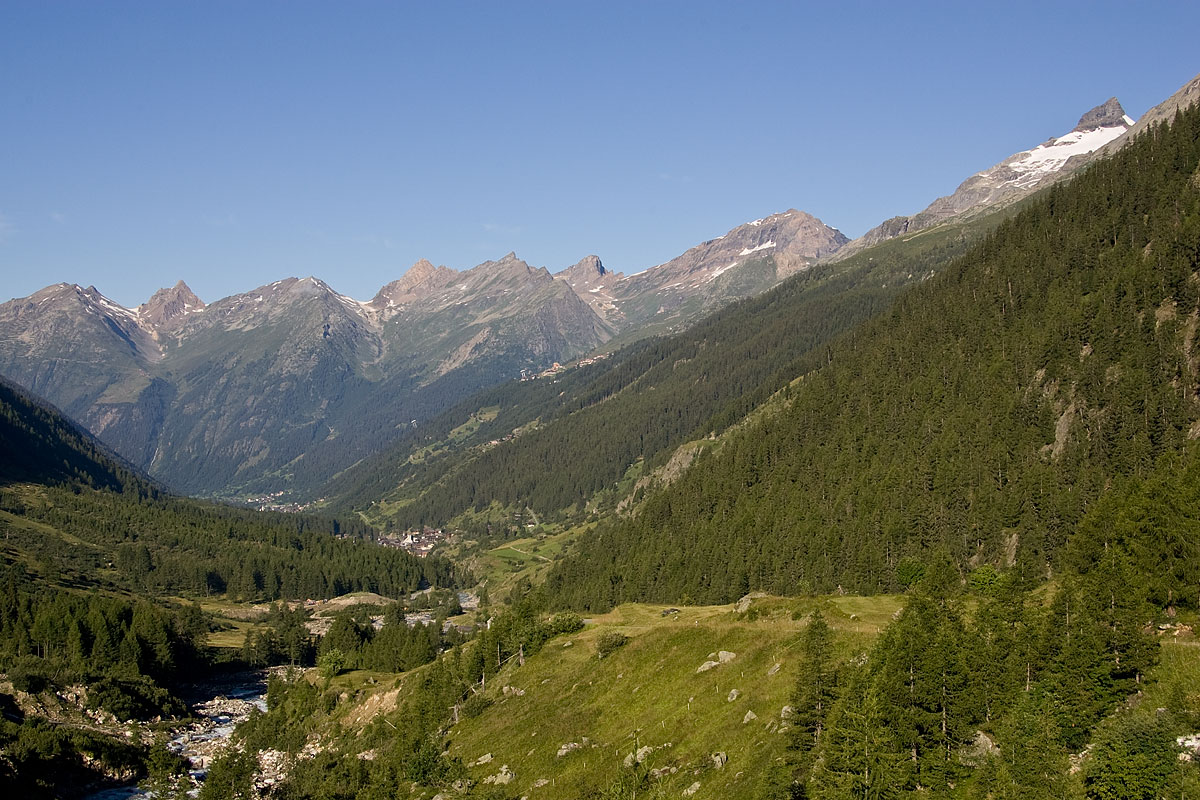
View of the Lötschental with the village of Blatten

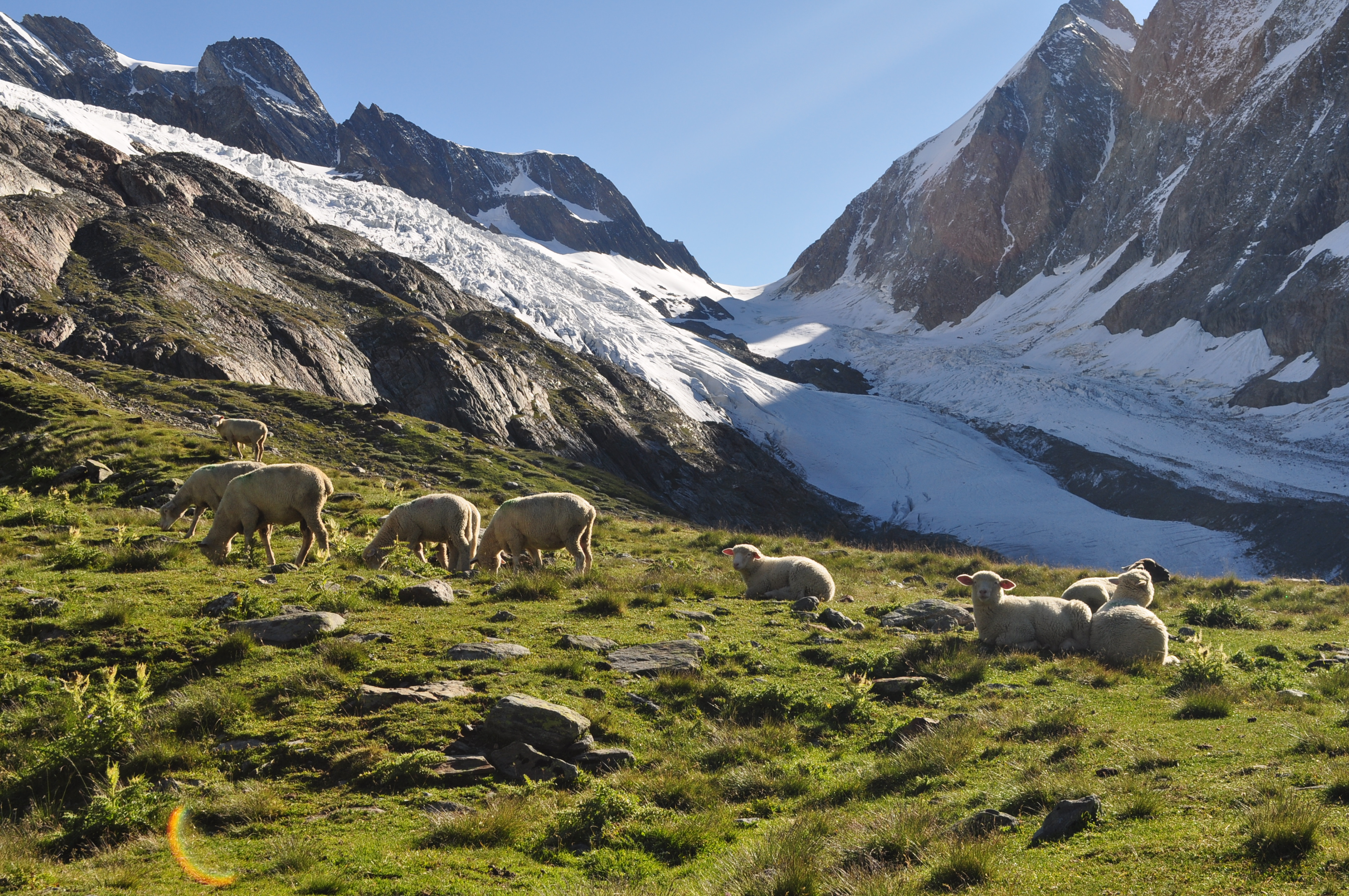
The Lötschenlücke and Langgletscher

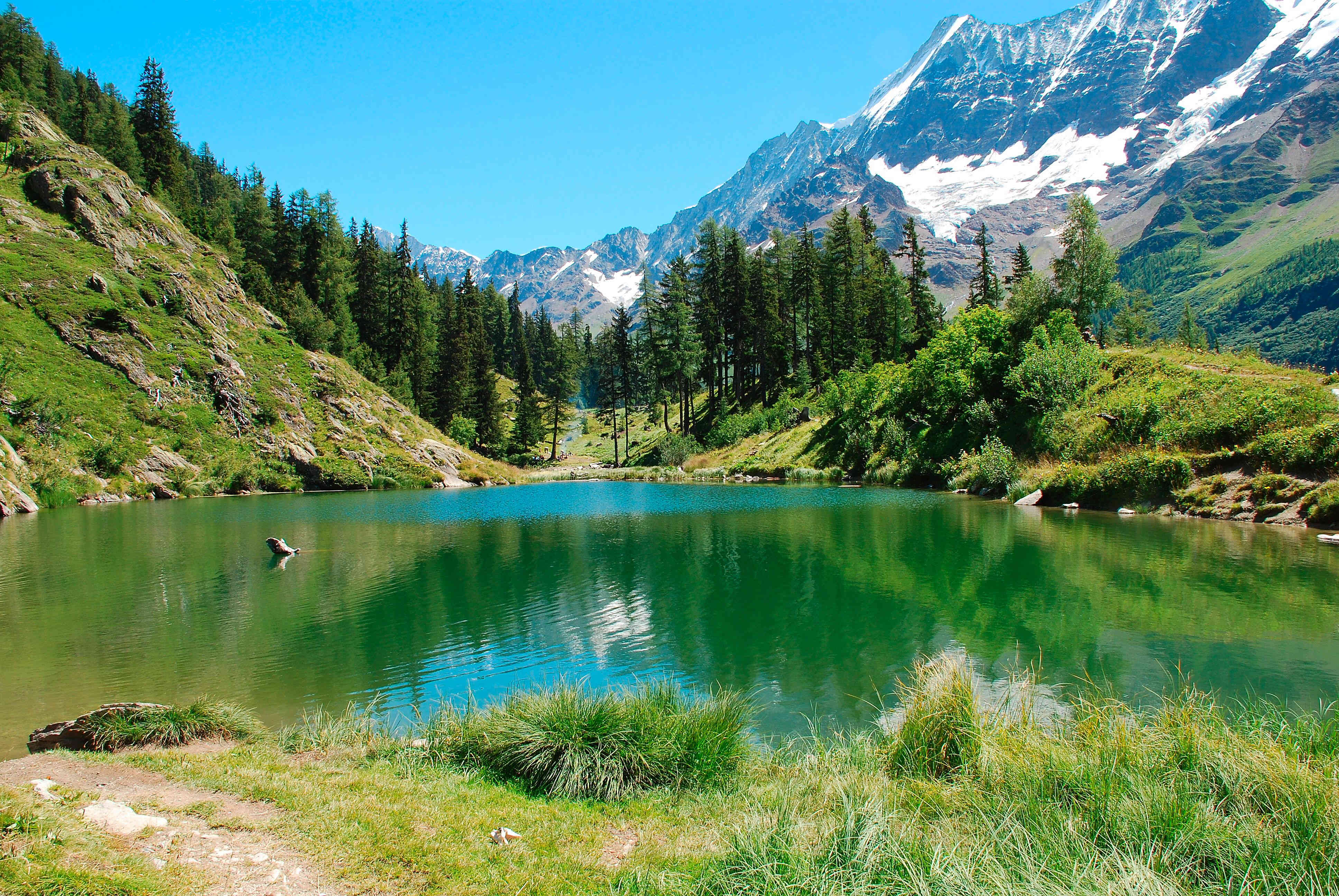
The Schwarzsee lake

=== Climate ===
According to the Köppen Climate Classification system, Blatten has a humid continental climate, abbreviated "Dfc" on climate maps.

Climate data for Blatten, Lötschental, elevation 1,538 m (5,046 ft), (1991–2020 normals, extremes 2015–present)
Month	Jan	Feb	Mar	Apr	May	Jun	Jul	Aug	Sep	Oct	Nov	Dec	Year
Record high °C (°F)	10.9 (51.6)	13.3 (55.9)	13.8 (56.8)	18.2 (64.8)	24.9 (76.8)	30.4 (86.7)	29.7 (85.5)	30.4 (86.7)	24.7 (76.5)	22.6 (72.7)	17.4 (63.3)	11.0 (51.8)	30.4 (86.7)
Mean daily maximum °C (°F)	0.1 (32.2)	1.8 (35.2)	5.3 (41.5)	8.8 (47.8)	13.9 (57.0)	18.1 (64.6)	20.4 (68.7)	19.8 (67.6)	15.8 (60.4)	11.5 (52.7)	4.8 (40.6)	0.4 (32.7)	10.1 (50.2)
Daily mean °C (°F)	−5.4 (22.3)	−4.4 (24.1)	−0.4 (31.3)	3.3 (37.9)	8.0 (46.4)	11.7 (53.1)	13.4 (56.1)	12.9 (55.2)	9.0 (48.2)	4.9 (40.8)	−0.6 (30.9)	−4.3 (24.3)	4.0 (39.2)
Mean daily minimum °C (°F)	−8.8 (16.2)	−8.9 (16.0)	−5.1 (22.8)	−1.4 (29.5)	2.5 (36.5)	5.2 (41.4)	7.0 (44.6)	7.0 (44.6)	3.8 (38.8)	0.7 (33.3)	−3.6 (25.5)	−7.2 (19.0)	−0.7 (30.7)
Record low °C (°F)	−19.1 (−2.4)	−22.1 (−7.8)	−15.9 (3.4)	−11.3 (11.7)	−6.2 (20.8)	−0.3 (31.5)	1.0 (33.8)	0.9 (33.6)	−2.6 (27.3)	−5.8 (21.6)	−14.2 (6.4)	−17.4 (0.7)	−22.1 (−7.8)
Average precipitation mm (inches)	96.8 (3.81)	78.1 (3.07)	77.0 (3.03)	62.1 (2.44)	94.6 (3.72)	90.7 (3.57)	93.2 (3.67)	99.2 (3.91)	68.6 (2.70)	89.4 (3.52)	92.9 (3.66)	121.4 (4.78)	1,064 (41.89)
Average precipitation days (≥ 1.0 mm)	9.7	9.2	9.2	8.3	10.8	11.3	11.4	11.3	9.0	9.8	9.8	10.5	120.3
Source 1: NOAA
Source 2: MeteoSwiss Infoclimat (extremes)

== Demographics ==
Historical population
Year	Pop.	±%
1850	234	—
1860	272	+16.2%
1870	288	+5.9%
1880	277	−3.8%
1888	284	+2.5%
1900	274	−3.5%
1910	305	+11.3%
1920	329	+7.9%
1930	343	+4.3%
1941	372	+8.5%
1950	362	−2.7%
1960	344	−5.0%
1970	343	−0.3%
1980	327	−4.7%
1990	296	−9.5%
2000	281	−5.1%
2010	307	+9.3%
2020	296	−3.6%

Blatten had a population of 303 in 2023.

As of 2000, most of the population (as of 2000) spoke German (280 or 99.6%) as their first language with the rest speaking English. Children and teenagers (0–19 years old) made up 17.8% of the population, while adults (20–64 years old) made up 56.2% and seniors (over 64 years old) make up 26%. There were 115 people who were single and never married in the municipality. There were 136 married individuals, 29 widows or widowers and 1 individual who was divorced.

Also as of 2000, there were 114 private households in the municipality, and an average of 2.4 persons per household. There were 35 households that consist of only one person and 10 households with five or more people. A total of 113 apartments (42.0% of the total) were permanently occupied, while 133 apartments (49.4%) were seasonally occupied and 23 apartments (8.6%) were empty. As of 2009, the construction rate of new housing units was 12.7 new units per 1000 residents. The vacancy rate for the municipality, in 2010, was 1.98%.

== Politics ==
In the 2007 federal election the most popular party was the CVP which received 74.87% of the vote. The next three most popular parties were the SP (11.66%), the SVP (10.46%) and the FDP (1.97%). In the federal election, a total of 182 votes were cast, and the voter turnout was 68.9%.

In the 2009 Conseil d'Etat/Staatsrat election a total of 191 votes were cast, of which 13 or about 6.8% were invalid. The voter participation was 80.3%, which is much more than the cantonal average of 54.67%. In the 2007 Swiss Council of States election a total of 179 votes were cast, of which 11 or about 6.1% were invalid. The voter participation was 70.5%, which is much more than the cantonal average of 59.88%.

=== Religion ===
From the 2000 census, 276 or 98.2% of the population were Catholic, while none belonged to the Swiss Reformed Church. Two people (or about 0.71% of the population) belonged to no church, or were agnostic or atheist, and 3 individuals (or about 1.07% of the population) did not answer the question.

== Economy ==
As of 2010, Blatten had an unemployment rate of 1.1%. As of 2008, there were 35 people employed in the primary economic sector and about 15 businesses involved in this sector. Two people were employed in the secondary sector and there was one business in this sector. 82 people were employed in the tertiary sector, with 16 businesses in this sector. There were 127 residents of the municipality who were employed in some capacity, of which females made up 30.7% of the workforce.

In 2008 the total number of full-time equivalent jobs was 74. The number of jobs in the primary sector was 14, all of which were in agriculture. The number of jobs in the secondary sector was two, all of which were in manufacturing. The number of jobs in the tertiary sector was 58. In the tertiary sector; six or 10.3% were in wholesale or retail sales or the repair of motor vehicles, one was in the movement and storage of goods, 43 or 74.1% were in a hotel or restaurant and one was the insurance or financial industry.

In 2000, there were 11 workers who commuted into the municipality and 81 workers who commuted away. The municipality is a net exporter of workers, with about 7.4 workers leaving the municipality for every one entering. Of the working population, 22% used public transportation to get to work, and 48% used a private car.

== Transport ==
Blatten lies on the road up the Lötschental valley from Steg and Goppenstein. The road passes through Blatten village and reaches its end at Fafleralp. A PostAuto bus service runs along the road as far as Fafleralp, connecting the settlements within the municipality to Goppenstein railway station, with some buses continuing to Steg.

== Education ==
In Blatten about 101 (or 35.9%) of the population have completed non-mandatory upper secondary education, and 7 (or 2.5%) have completed additional higher education (either university or a Fachhochschule). Of the seven who completed tertiary schooling, all were Swiss men. As of 2000, there were 26 students from Blatten who attended schools outside the municipality.
