= Lötschental =

Valley in Switzerland

Coordinates: 46°25′N 7°50′E

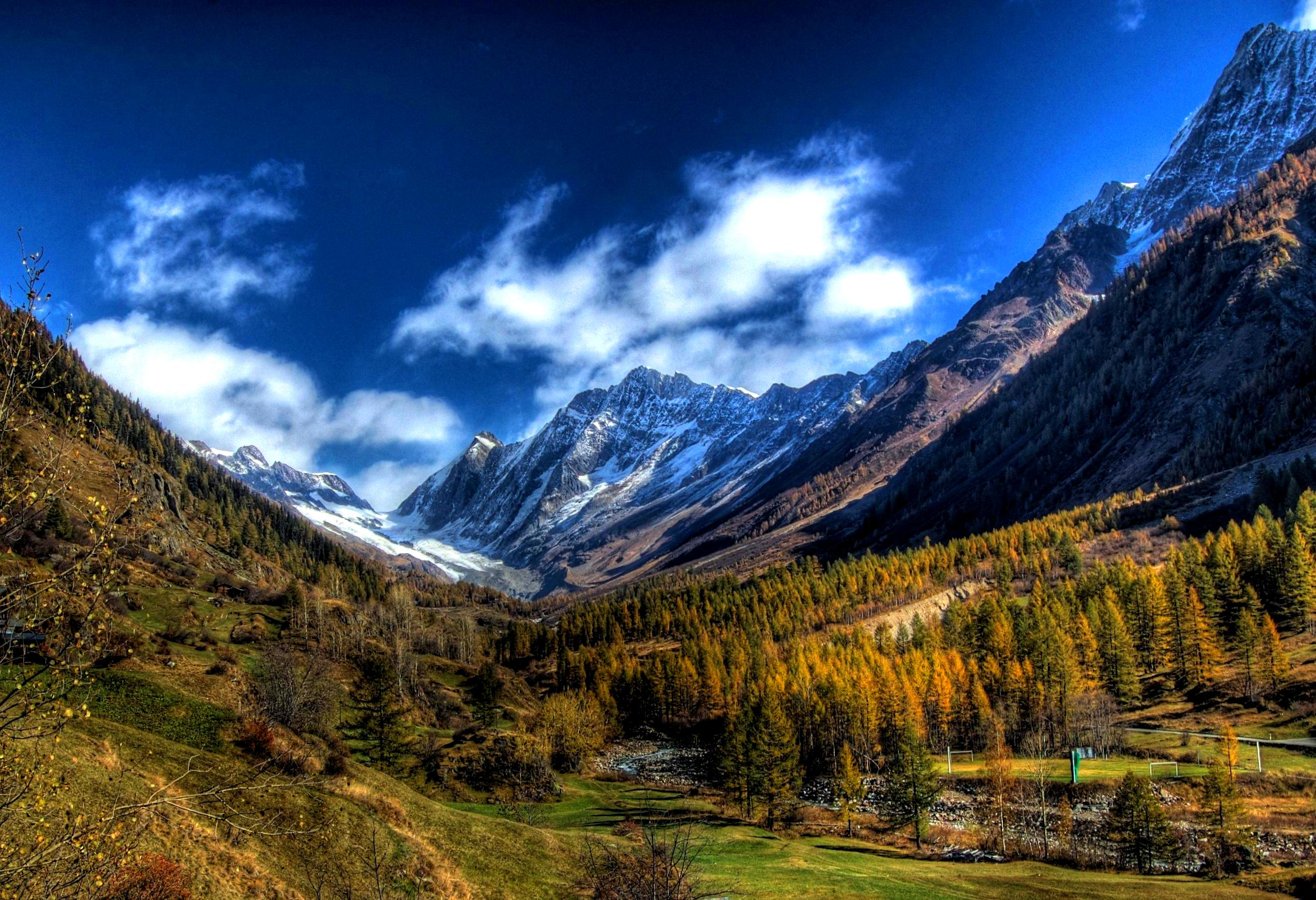
The Lötschental in the Swiss Alps

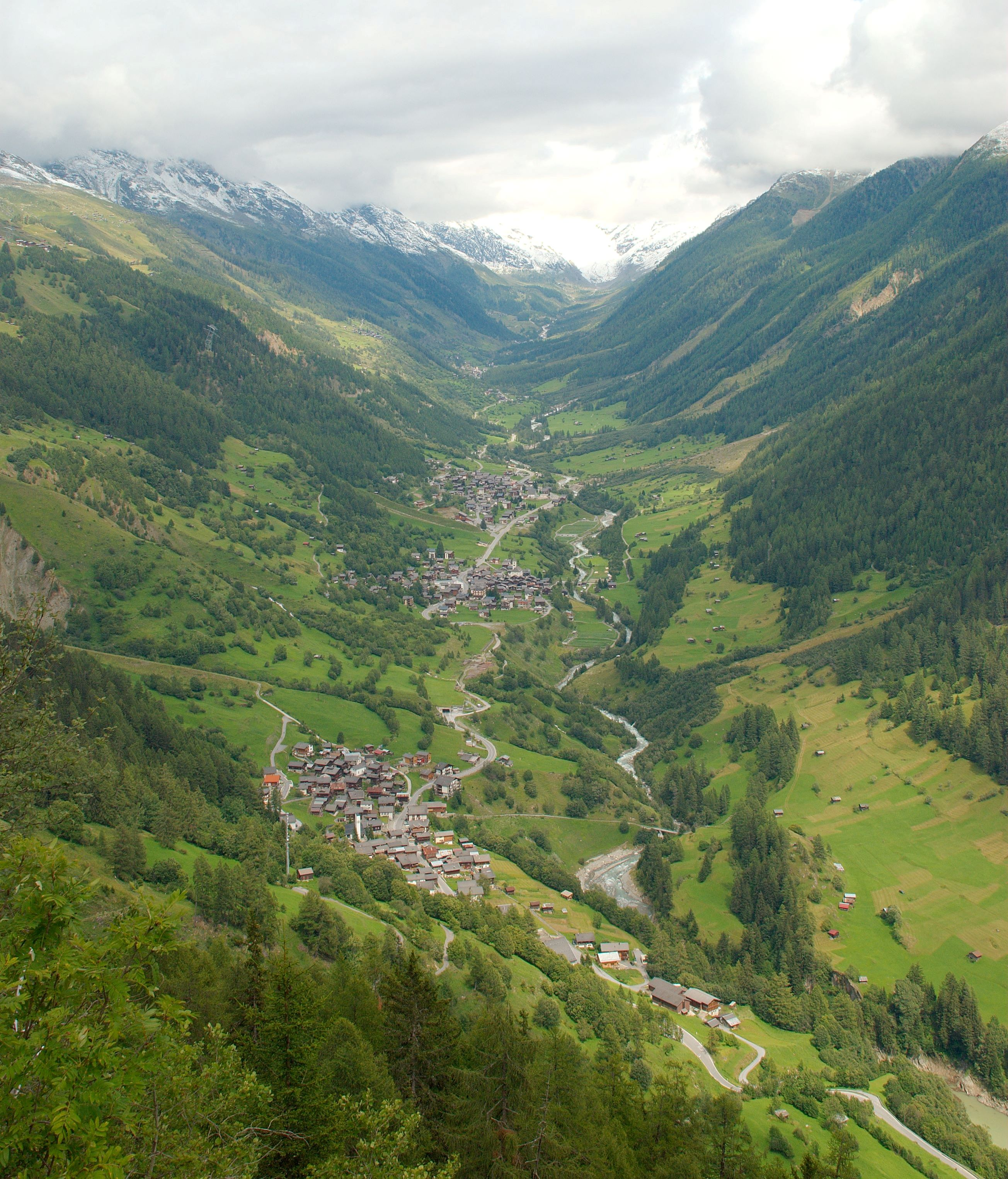
View to the east from a point west of Ferden

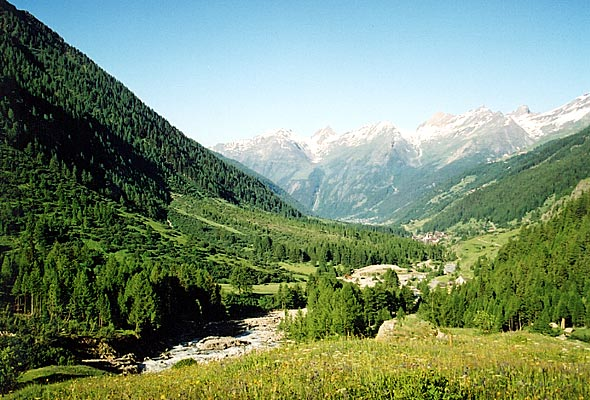
View of the Lötschental from Fafleralp

The Lötschental (German pronunciation: [ˈlœt͡ʃn̩taːl]) is the largest valley on the northern side of the Rhône valley in the canton of Valais in Switzerland. It lies in the Bernese Alps, with the Lonza running down the length of the valley from its source within the Langgletscher (lit.: Long Glacier).

== Geography ==
The valley extends about 27 kilometers (17 mi) from the Lötschenlücke (3178 m) at the top of the Langgletscher to the mouth of the valley at Steg/Gampel (630 m). It is surrounded by 3,000 meter high mountains, including the Bietschhorn (3,934 m), the Hockenhorn (3,293 m), the Wilerhorn (3,307 m) and the Petersgrat (3,205 m). The Jungfrau-Aletsch Protected Area is the most glaciated area in the Swiss Alps, and was declared a Natural World Heritage Site by decision of UNESCO on December 13, 2001, along with southern and eastern parts of the Lötschental.

The main villages of the Lötschental are Wiler and Kippel, with 538 and 383 inhabitants respectively. Other villages in the valley include Ferden and Blatten. Altogether, the valley has approximately 1,500 inhabitants.

== History ==
The Lötschental was likely first settled during the Roman period, but remained largely cut off from the outside world until the beginning of the twentieth century. The valley remained remote and difficult to access, especially during the winters, until the construction of the Lötschbergbahn, between 1907 and 1913, connected it to an international railway line.

Traditional farming, involving primarily agriculture and cattle and sheep rearing, began to disappear with the extension of the road to Blatten after World War II. Tourism increasingly came to function as the valley's primary industry, especially since the construction of a cablecar from Wiler to Lauchernalp in 1972. This lift had a capacity of only sixty people and was later replaced with one of a hundred. The Lötschental is now a destination resort for hiking with many tracks, such as the Höhenweg, and winter sports, including Nordic and Alpine skiing as well as sledging and snowshoeing. In November 2003, a new gondola lift from Gandegg to the Hockenhorngrat was opened, giving access to the Milibachgletscher and the Lötschen Pass. In December 2017 a six-person chair lift was opened from the top of the cablecar station to Stafel replacing the old chair and drag lifts originally built in the sixties, or seventies.

Lauchernalp and Fischbiel have now 1,500 beds for rent, five restaurants and one hotel. The lift system supports a varied ski terrain with a vertical drop of 1,000 m or more and 33 km of ski runs.

The Lauchernalp ski area has FIS homologated race courses in all disciplines of Alpine skiing and was the venue for the Swiss National Championships in 1974.

On 28 May 2025, a large landslide in the valley buried the village of Blatten. The landslide had been anticipated, and the village had been evacuated since 19 May.

== Tschäggättä ==
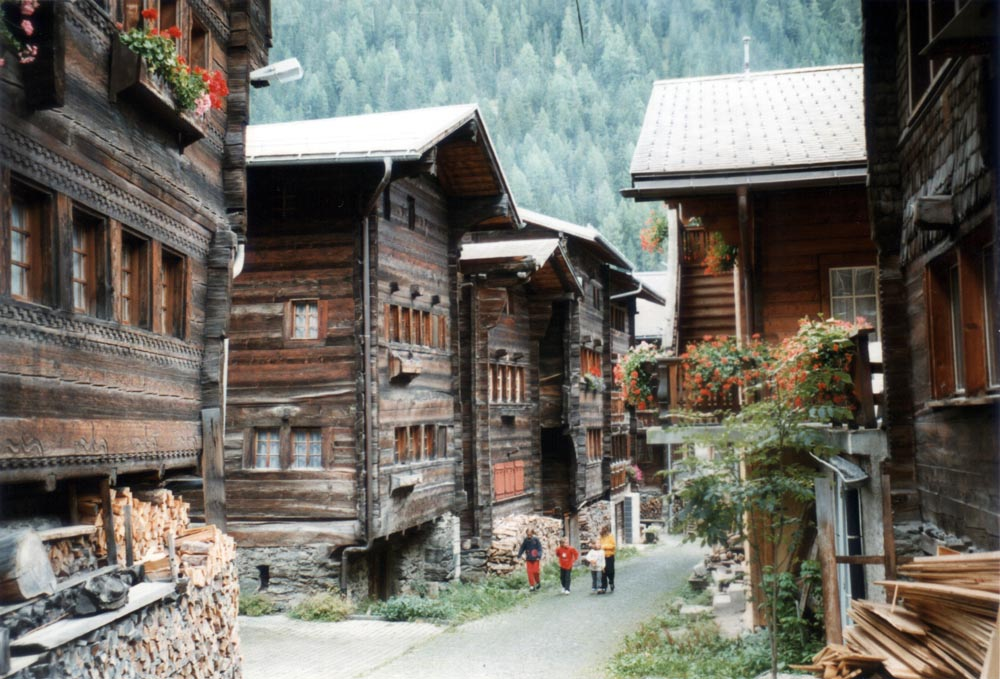
Wooden Houses in a village in the Lötschental

The Lötschental is known for its unique local custom involving the so-called Tschäggättä: frightening figures wearing furs and carved wooden masks that walk the streets during carnival tossing soot at onlookers. The custom developed during the valley's history of relative isolation, though its exact origins are a matter of debate. The first official mention of the Tschäggättä occurs in a church chronicle of Kippel dating from 1860, and witnesses the local prior lamenting the difficulties of enforcing a ban on "the terrible misuse of the so-called Tschäggättä".
