= Gastern Valley =

Valley in the Bernese Highlands, Switzerland

Coordinates: 46°27′21″N 7°41′54″E

The Gastern Valley ('Gasterntal') is a valley near Kandersteg in the Bernese Oberland in Switzerland. The Kander river flows through it. The rear valley basin is about 1,600 metres above sea level, while the valley exit is about 1,350 metres above sea level. The valley is inhabited only during the summer months.

In the past, Selden, the rear part of the valley, was inhabited all year round; two inns offered travellers crossing the Lötschen Pass (2,676 m) accommodation and food.

After the easy-to-walk path over the Gemmi pass (2.269 m) was opened in 1739, the population of the Gastern Valley declined. In 1785, only 50 people still lived in the valley. In 1924/1925, the road through the Klus ('Chlusenstrasse') was built as part of an unemployment programme.

The Lötschberg Tunnel and the Lötschberg Base Tunnel run beneath the valley floor.

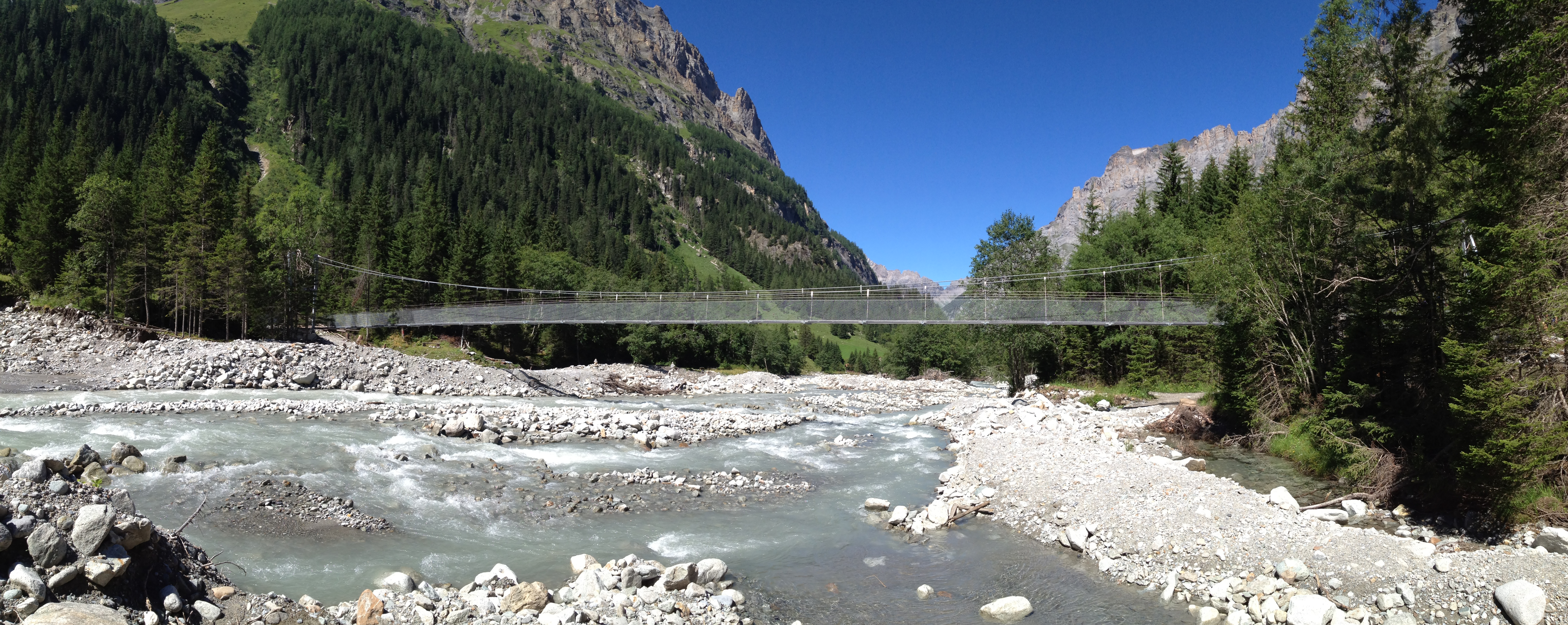
bridge crosing the Kander

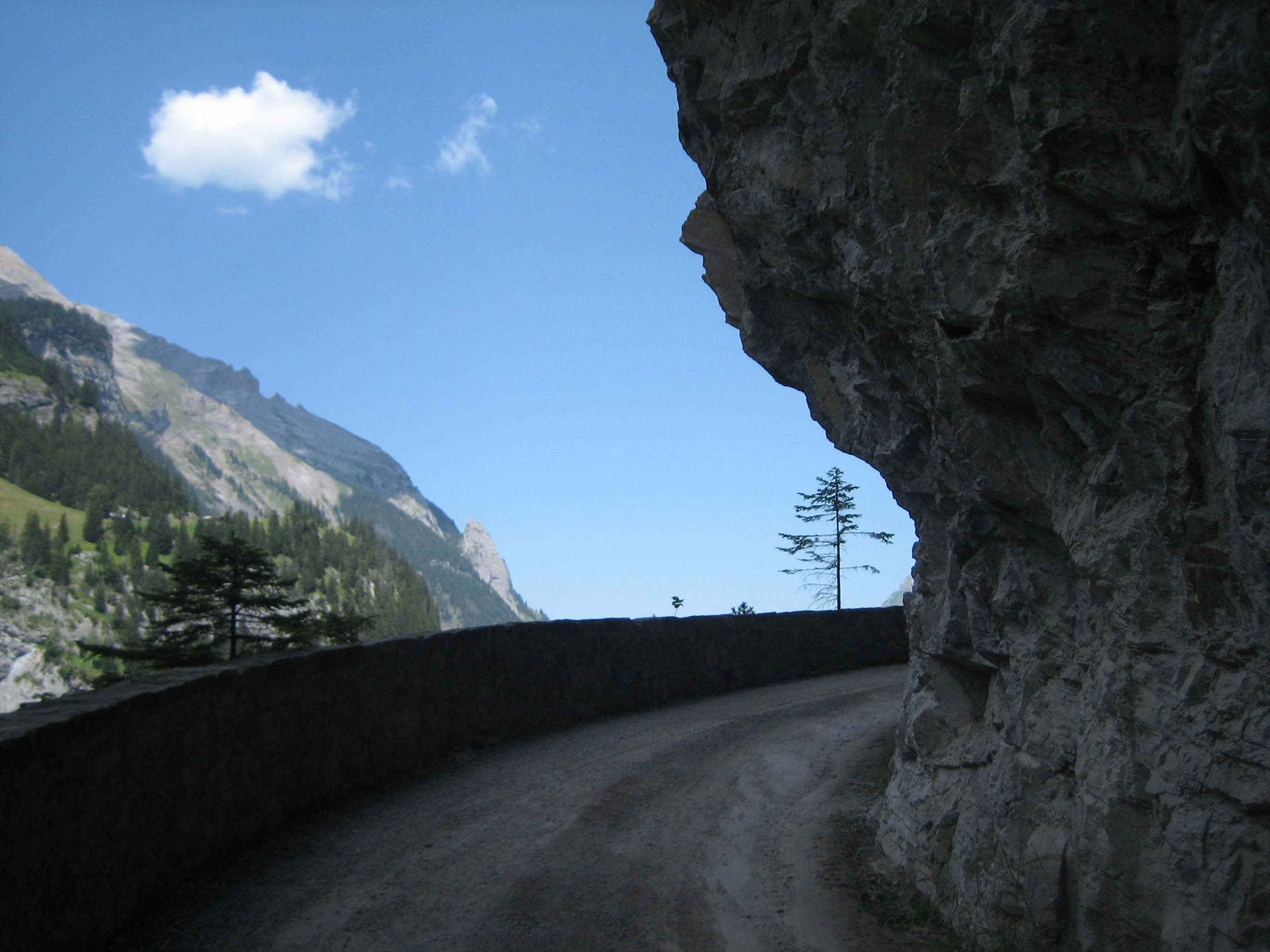
Zufahrtsstrasse, built 1924/25

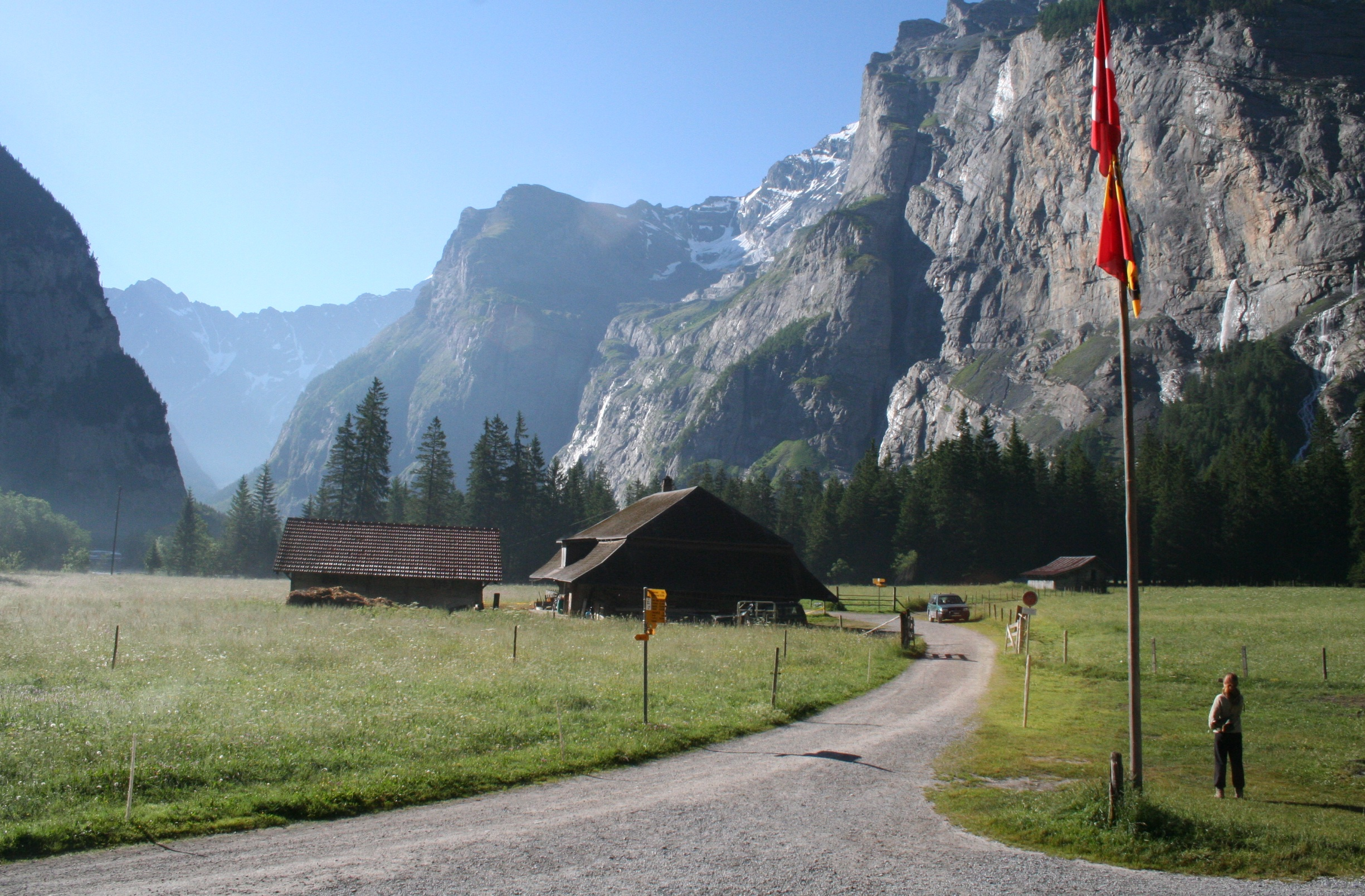
Gastern Valley

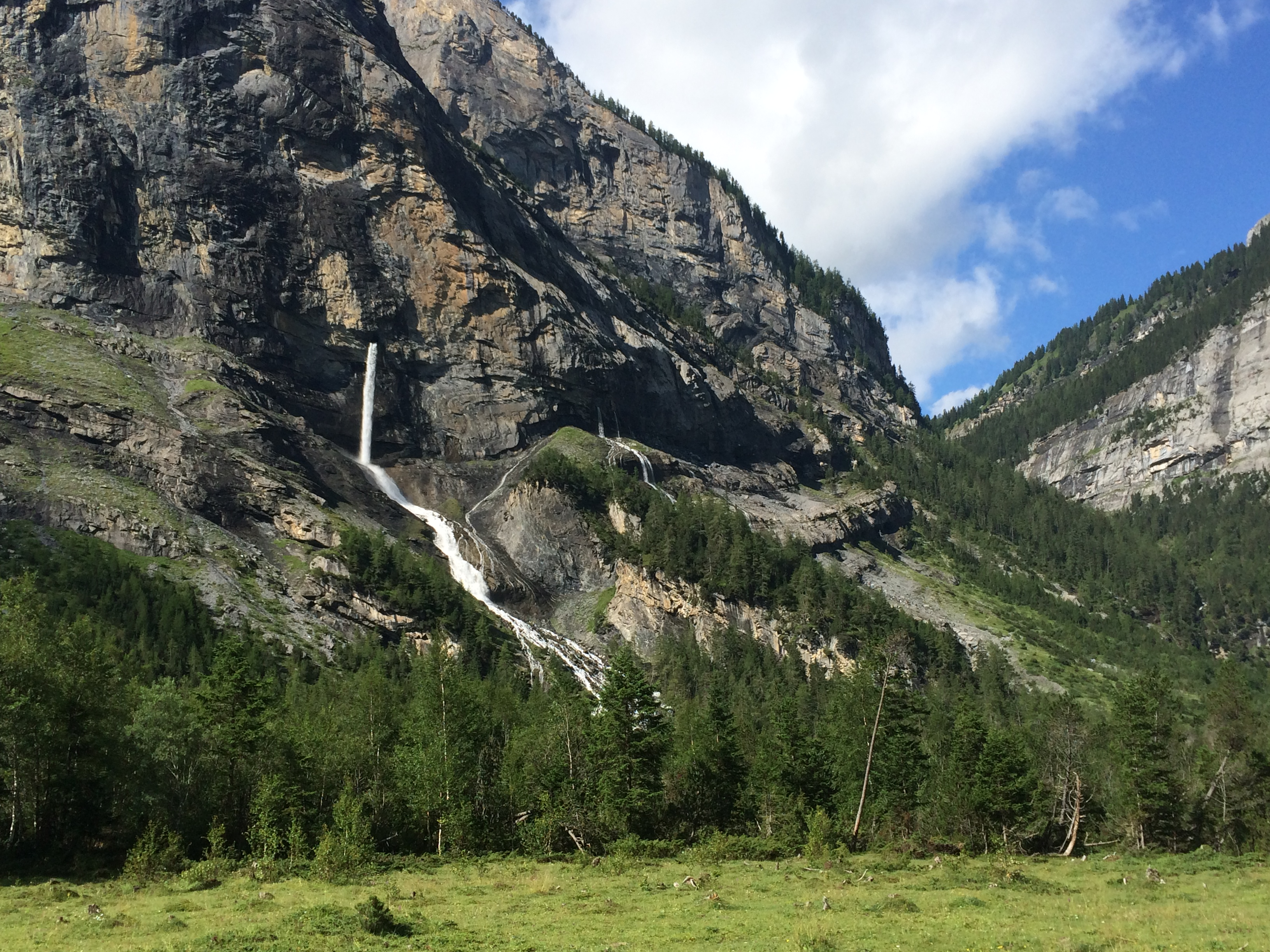
Geltenbach waterfall

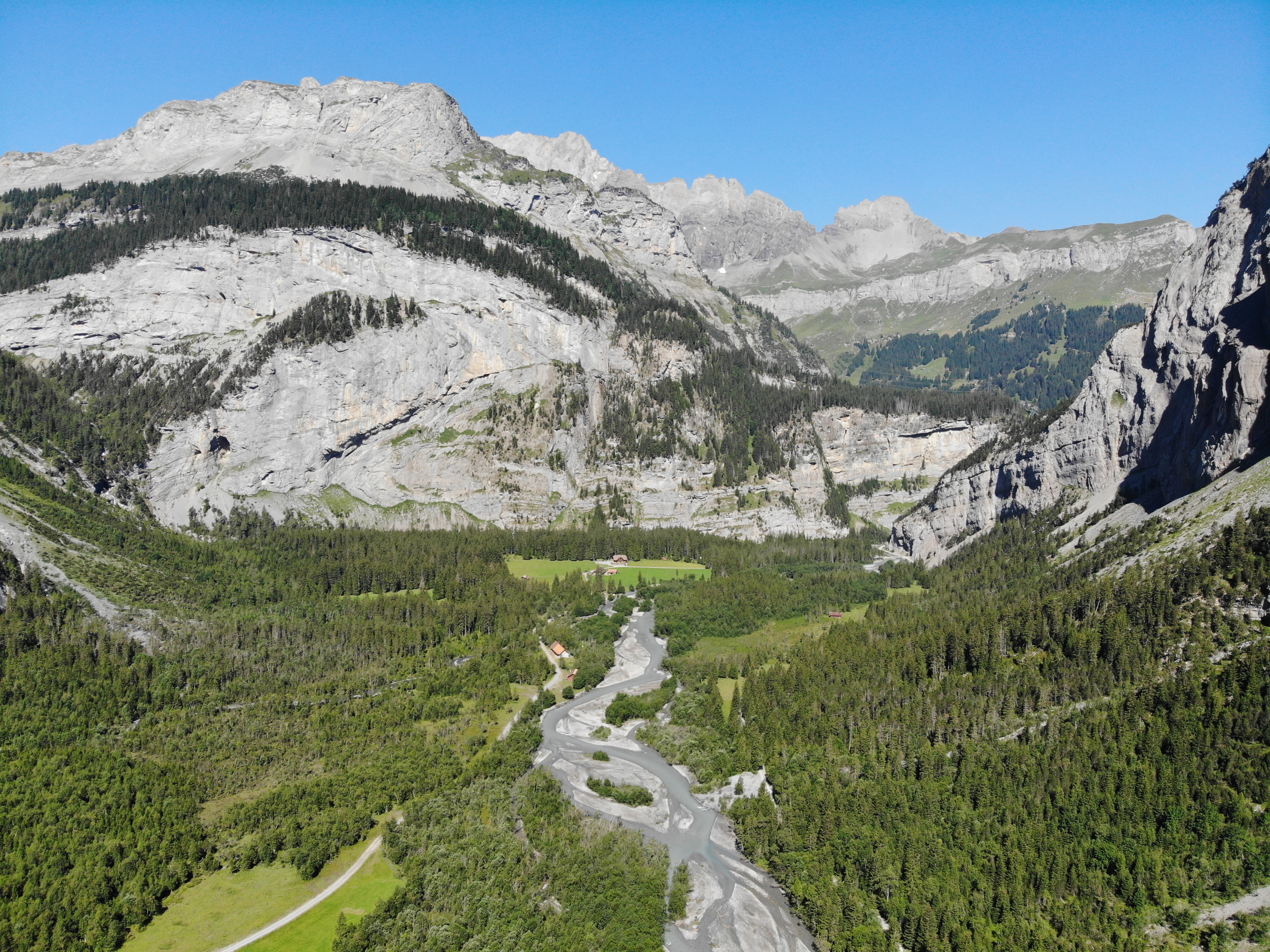
Gasternholz

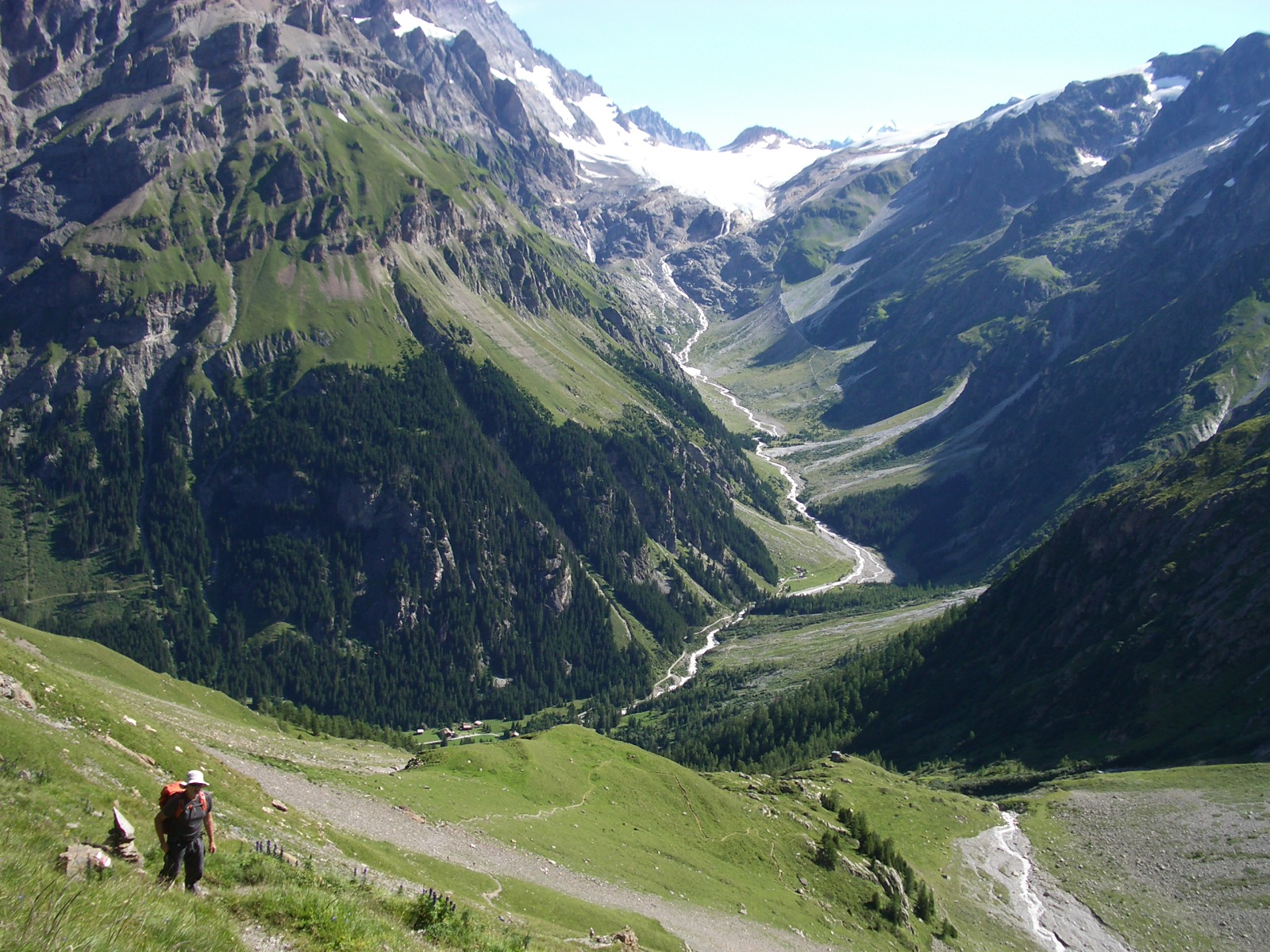

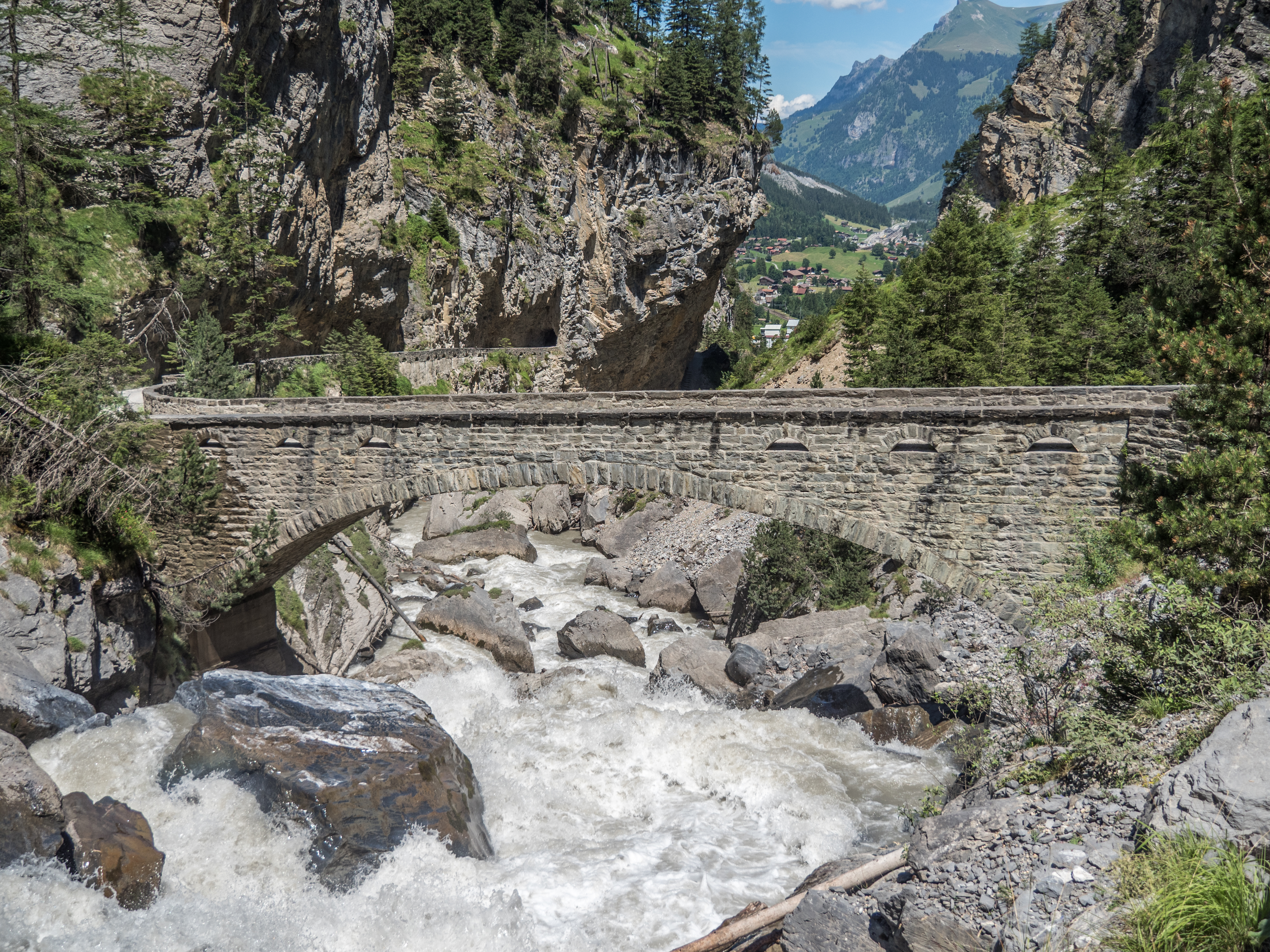
Chlusenbrücke (built 1925)

Panoramic view of the Gasterntal valley, taken from the summit of the Hockenhorn. On the right is the Kanderfirn, on the left the east face of the Balmhorn; opposite in the centre is the Doldenhorn, to the right of which is the Blüemlisalp.
