= Oeschinensee and Kandertal landslides =

Landslides in Switzerland

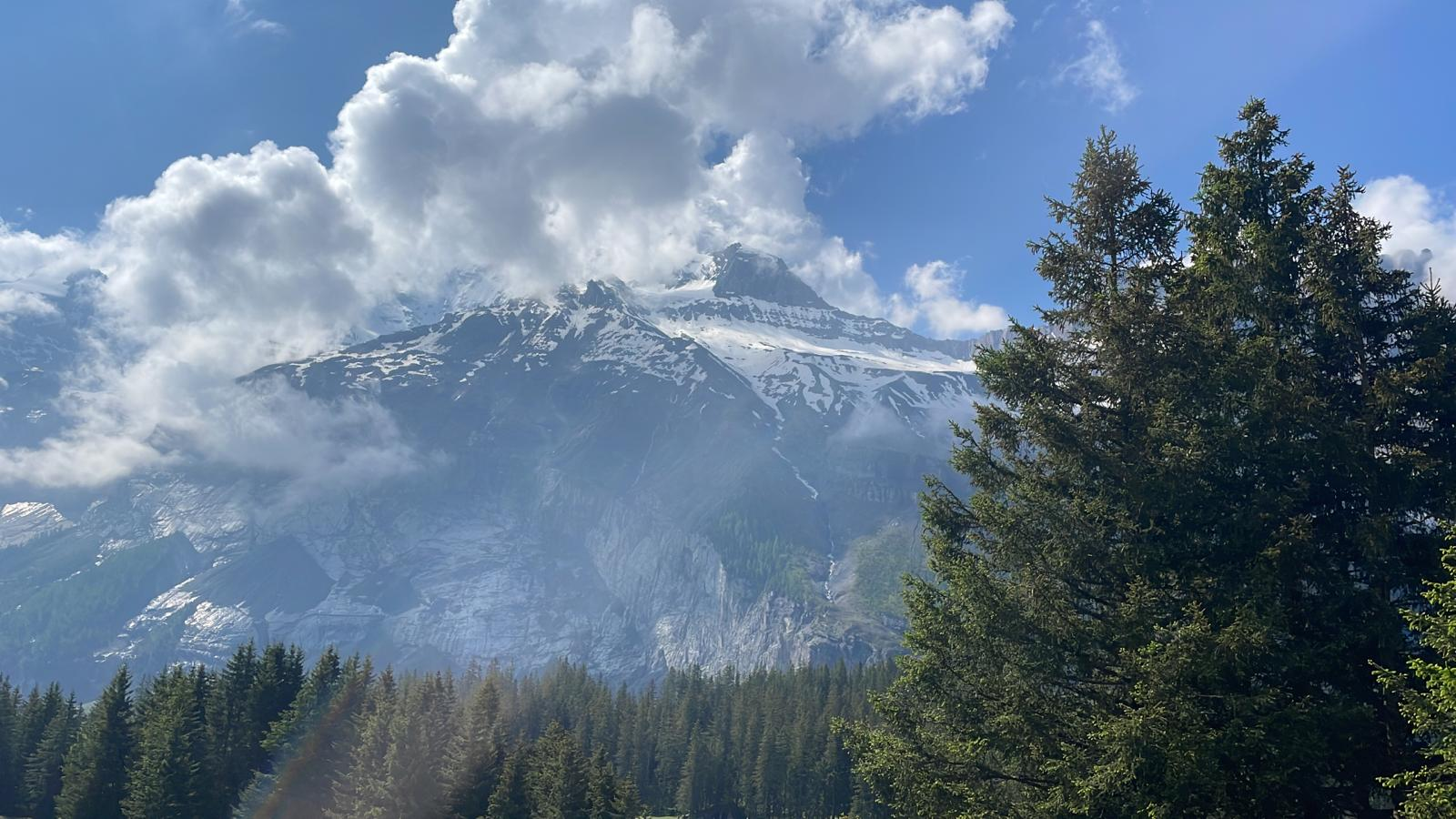
The landslide scar of the more recent Oeschinensee collapse

The area of Oeschinen Lake and Kander river valley in Switzerland have been subject of multiple large landslides during the Holocene. Both the number and timing of landslides are disputed, but the most recent estimates state that the large Kander landslide occurred about 3,210 years ago and the smaller Oeschinen Lake landslide 2,300 years ago. Both may have been caused by earthquakes, and the latter landslide generated the Oeschinen Lake. More recent landslides have occurred, and unstable rock masses occur in the landslide area.

== Geographical context and importance ==
Large landslides that block entire valleys are a considerable hazard in mountainous regions, in particular when they form highly unstable dams on rivers; the breach of such a dam on the Dadu River in China in 1786 caused a flood that killed 100,000 people. On the other hand, such landslides can generate spectacular landscapes, such as the glaciated terrain around Oeschinen Lake in Switzerland which has drawn tourists since 150 years and is now part of the Jungfrau-Aletsch protected area. Climate variations can cause slope instabilities and with global warming scientific interest in large collapses of mountains has risen. Giant landslides in the Alps are commonly related to the destabilizing effects of ice retreat at the end of the ice ages, but the landslides often occur millennia after the retreat of ice, suggesting that additional triggers such as climate variations and earthquake activity - perhaps in turn caused by deglaciation - are necessary to actually cause collapses.

Oeschinensee is situated in the Bernese Alps, within a 5 kilometres (3.1 mi) long side valley of the Kandertal, and lies at about 1,578 metres (5,177 ft) elevation. It receives inflow from glaciers and springs, while its waters eventually seep through landslide debris although in the past (before a small dam was built) the lake periodically overflowed. The mountains are largely formed by various formations of Mesozoic rocks, which are mostly limestones with marls and sandstones; their layered structure and the weakness of the marl layers facilitates the development of landslides. The seismically active Rawil depression is only about 20 kilometres (12 mi) southeast of the Kander area.

== Collapses ==
Multiple landslides and collapses have occurred in the Oeschinen area, including the Kandertal and Oeschinensee collapses; both landslides left debris at the outlet of the Oeschinensee. Apart from the two large landslides, avalanches, rockfalls and debris flows have left smaller deposits. A pre-Kandertal landslide has been identified in drill cores.

=== Kandertal ===
The landslide ran over a length of 12 kilometres (7.5 mi) to just north of Reckenthal. It dammed the Kander River, generating a lake in the area of present-day Kandersteg which broke 200–300 years after the landslide and generated an outburst flood and debris flow, redepositing landslide debris as far as Frutigen. A more recent interpretation in 2020 is that no lake was formed. It is possible that winds generated by the landslide blew down forests, and sparks from moving rocks ignited wildfires.

With a surface area of 10 square kilometres (3.9 sq mi) and a volume of 0.8 cubic kilometres (0.19 cu mi) is one of the largest landslides in the Alps. and detached from the north-northwestern flanks of the Fisistock mountain, with an additional collapse from Bire Mountain north of Fisistock. Computer simulations indicate that the collapse occurred over a timespan of about two minutes, and the debris first descended into the Kander valley and then proceeded northwards. The emplacement would have taken about ten minutes. During its later stages, the northern part of the landslide incorporated wet sediments from the Kander valley and began to collapse, forming extensional features such as the ridges at Blausee.

The Fisistock collapse area forms a box-shaped depression, whose western headwall reaches 0.5 kilometres (0.31 mi) height while the eastern one is less conspicuous. At Kandersteg, the landslide debris forms the Uf der Höh hill, which is cut by secondary scarps, and which formed when the landslide hit the opposite valley flanks. The debris deposit is formed by large blocks up to several metres wide, with spaces often filled in by later soils. The terrain features hummocks and ridges perpendicular to the slide direction. Some groundwater-fed lakes such as Blausee lie within the debris deposit. Undulating terrain at the end of the landslide deposit suggest that it behaved like a fluid there.

The Kandertal landslide was originally interpreted to have occurred 9,600 years ago, at a time where numerous giant landslides happened in the Austrian and Swiss Alps and a possibly earthquake-related group of landslides south of Kandersteg. More recent research in 2020 however implies that it actually occurred 3,210±220 years ago, at a time where a change on climate and an expansion of glaciers in the area of the landslide was taking place. Lake sediments indicate the occurrence of a large earthquake about 3,300 years ago, which, while not necessarily directly causing the landslide, may have destabilized the slopes that later failed.

=== Oeschinensee ===
While the Oeschinensee collapse was once considered to have been contemporaneous with the Kandertal avalanche, research published in 2018 indicates that it actually occurred only 2,300±1,200 years ago. The landslide took place just before historical times in Switzerland, but sediments in lakes have shown evidence of earthquakes during that time that could have caused the collapse. While glacial erosion that undercuts valley slopes is necessary to cause landslides, often additional triggers such as earthquakes are necessary to actually trigger the collapse.

It detached from the northwestern flank of the Doldenhorn mountain, reached the valley floor after about 20 seconds with a speed of about 65 metres (213 ft), where it was deflected by an earlier landslide deposit (probably from the Kandertal event). The slide crossed the Oeschinen valley and ran up the opposite slope and down the valley. After about one minute the collapse was complete.

The landslide left a conspicuous slide surface bordered by high cliffs. These cliffs reach heights of 80 metres (260 ft); the highest point lies at 2,250 metres (7,380 ft) elevation. Debris from the landslide covers an area of 1.1 square kilometres (0.42 sq mi) at the outlet of Oeschinensee and may extend below the lake surface. The deposits feature large boulders and hummocky topography. How the landscape looked like before the collapse is unclear but a volume of 0.046 cubic kilometres (0.011 cu mi) has been estimated on the basis of plausible reconstructions both of the source area and the landslide deposit. The landslide blocked the valley and created Oeschinen Lake, although it is possible that the earlier landslide left an earlier lake or swamp.

=== Post-Oeschinensee collapses ===
Lake sediments in Oeschinen Lake show evidence of turbidites, some of which could be related to collapses caused by earthquakes. A number of collapse scarps lie on the mountains surrounding the lake and could have been the source of landslides. At least six such collapses took place. Some of the collapses may have occurred in historical times; a flood from the lake in 1846 AD may have been caused by an unobserved landslide.

=== Future collapses ===
The headwalls of the Kandertal landslide are still unstable. In summer 2018 a volume of 0.02 cubic kilometres (0.0048 cu mi) in the "Bim Spitze Stei" area between the Kandertal and Oeschinensee landslide detachment areas became noticeably unstable. Geophysical analyses have shown that there are a number of rock masses in motion, some of them containing warm permafrost, with most motion occurring in summer. As of 2021, the speed of the motion has increased with every year.

There are a number of scenarios for a future collapse of the Spitze Stei. Most of them would spare the Oeschinen lake and Kandersteg, but buildings close to the lake would be in danger. Landslides could dam local creeks and generate mudflows that can reach Kandersteg. As a consequence, the area below the Oeschinensee landslide scar has been closed off and dry dams were built above the village in 2021.

== Research history ==
The landslide deposits were originally interpreted as glacial deposits, before outcrops investigated during the construction of railroads led to the discovery of the Kandertal landslide in 1897 or 1909. Over the 20th and 21st century, different estimates on the number, ages, causes and volumes of the landslide deposits have been made. A major source of uncertainty is how to separate distinct landslide deposits; usually, the Oeschinensee landslide was considered a single event. The increased instability observed in summer 2018 led to an investigation of the detachment area, with drilling, satellite mapping and the installation of telemetry devices among other responses.
