= Kander (Switzerland) =

River in Switzerland

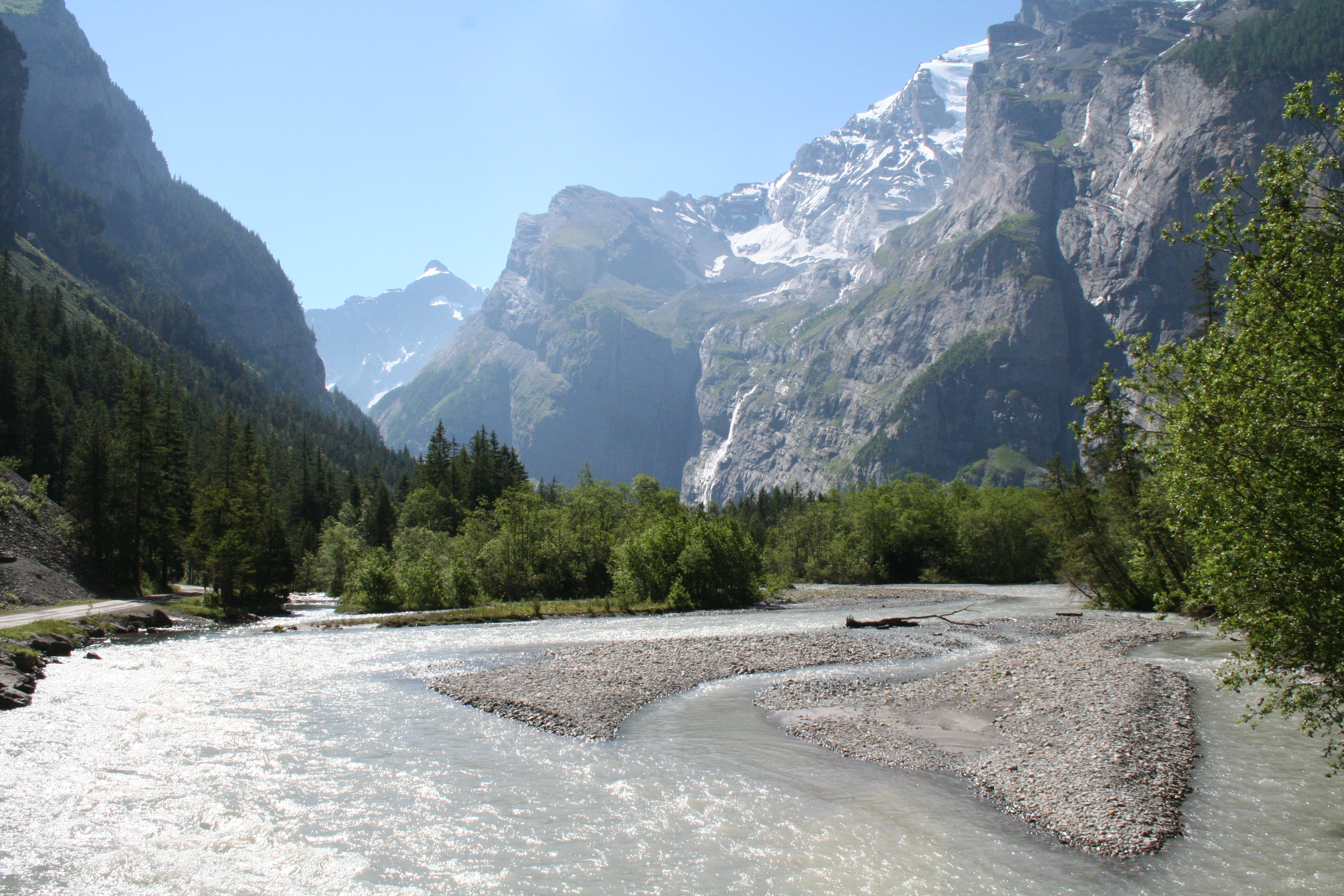
- The Kander in the Gasterntal

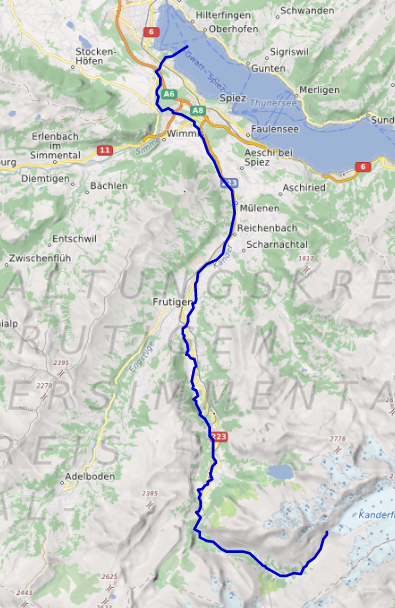
- Course of the Kander

Location
- Country: Switzerland
- State: Bern

Physical characteristics
- Source
  - location: Kander Neve, Switzerland
  - coordinates: 46°27′53″N 07°45′54″E
  - elevation: 2,301 m (7,549 ft)
- Mouth
  - location: Lake Thun, Switzerland
  - coordinates: 46°43′02″N 07°38′22″E
  - elevation: 558 m (1,831 ft)
- Length: 44 km (27 mi)
- Discharge
  - location: Lake Thun/Aare

Basin features
- Progression: Lake Thun→ Aare→ Rhine→ North Sea
- Tributaries
  - left: Engstlige, Simme
  - right: Öschibach, Chiene, Suld

The Kander is a river in Switzerland. It is 44 kilometres (27 mi) long and has a watershed of 1,126 square kilometres (435 sq mi). The Kander is a tributary of the Aare, the longest river to begin and end entirely in Switzerland. The Kander once flowed directly into the Aare, downstream from the city of Thun. However, since 1714 its confluence with the Aare is at Lake Thun, upstream from the city.

The drainage water from the Kander Neve (glacier) in the middle of the Bernese Alps at an altitude of 2,301 m (7,549 ft) flows through the Gastern Valley westward. 3 kilometres (1.9 mi) south of Kandersteg it turns to north into the larger Kandertal. After 14 kilometres (8.7 mi) it converges in Frutigen with the Engstlige from the left, its second major tributary. The Engstligental with Adelboden at its south end, runs more or less parallel to the Kandertal before they converge into the Frutigtal. Continuing northwards, the Frutigtal makes a long bend to the west in order to get around the Niesen. Between Spiez and Reutigen it converges with the Simme from the left, its major tributary, and turns to the north again and flows into the Lake of Thun after a break through a hill, which used to prevent it flowing into the lake until 1714. Here the river crosses the A6 motorway.

== Course ==
The source of the Kander is fed from the Kanderfirn glacier in the Blüemlisalp massif. Initially the river in an easterly direction, until it turns sharply north just south of the village of Kandersteg. This section is known as the Gastern Valley.

In Kandersteg, the Öschibach, a tributary stream that drains the Oeschinensee, joins the Kander. The river then runs north through Kandergrund as far as Frutigen, where it is joined by another tributary, the Engstlige.

Below Frutigen the river flows through Reichenbach im Kandertal, where it meets the Chiene, and Mülenen, where it meets the Suld. Finally, near the village of Wimmis, it meets the Simme. The valley downstream of Frutigen is known as the Frutigtal.

The last short section of today's river, the Kanderschlucht or Kander canyon, is artificial, having been created as a result of the Kander Correction (see below). At the end of the canyon, the river flows into Lake Thun.

Between Mülenen and Kandersteg, the river is followed by the Lötschberg railway line on its climb to the northern portal of the Lötschberg tunnel, which passes under the Gastertal on its way to Brig and the Rhone Valley. A road also follows the valley to Kandersteg and beyond into the Gastern Valley, but unlike the railway this is a dead-end, with no through road route across the mountains.

== Kander Correction ==
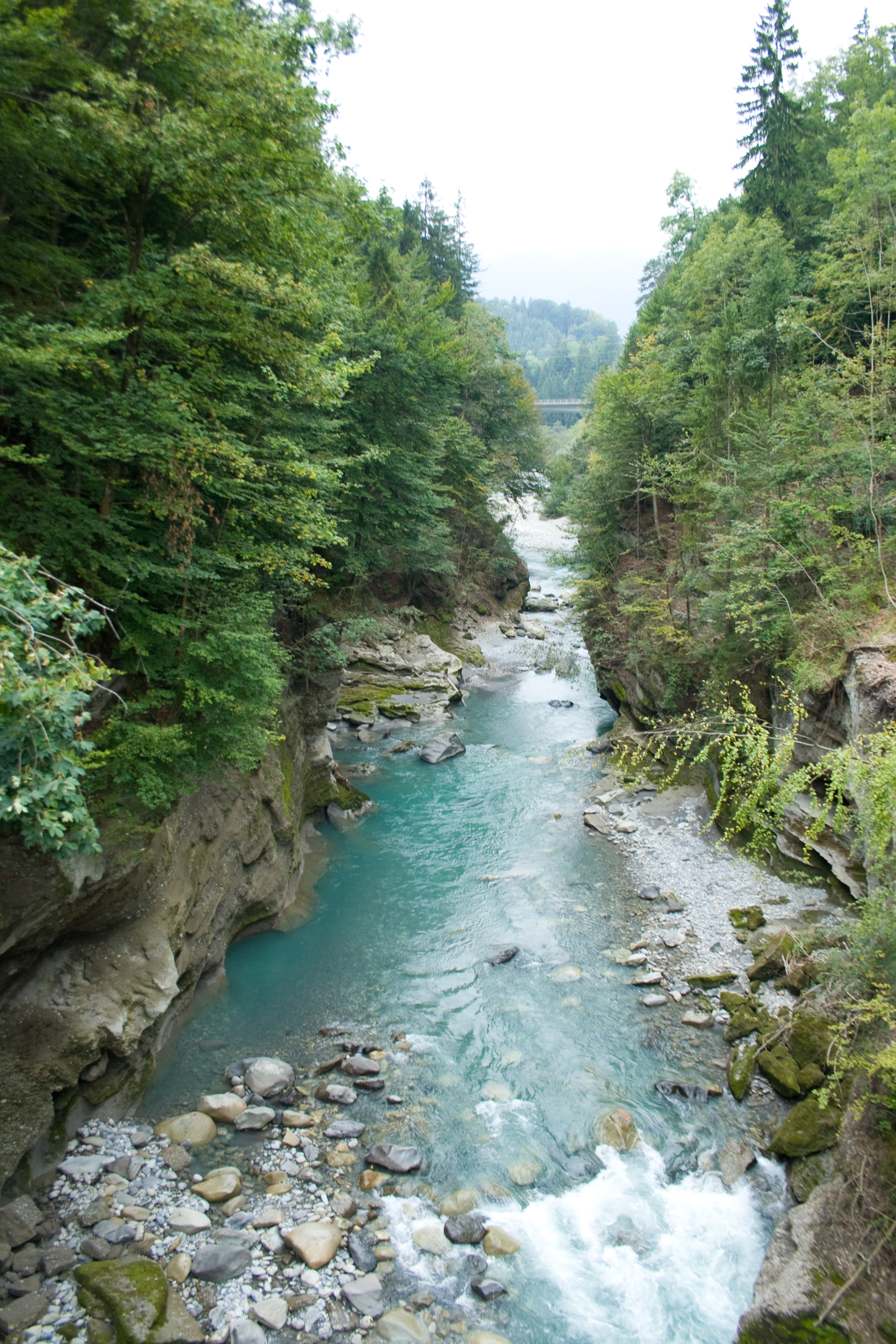
The artificially created Kanderschlucht

The Kander originally flowed through the low lying Thun Allmend area and entered the Aare between the city of Thun and Uttigen. As a result, the Allmend was repeatedly flooded.

As the river flowed within a few hundred meters of Lake Thun, there were early proposals to divert the river into the lake, thus avoiding the Allmend and stopping the flooding. At the beginning of the 18th Century, the engineer Samuel Bodmer created plans involving a cutting through the Strättlighügel ridge that separated the river and lake.

The plans were approved in 1711, and work began but was delayed by the second Battle of Villmergen. In the spring of 1713 work restarted under the direction of Bern's city architect Samuel Jenner, but with a tunnel instead of the unfinished cutting. Work was finished by the end of the year, but in 1714, the river started to enlarge the channel, causing the tunnel to collapse and creating today's Kanderschlucht or Kander canyon.

The Kander correction was the first piece of major water course re-engineering in Switzerland and lack of experience subsequently led to problems. The amount of water flowing into Lake Thun was increased by 60%, with a commensurate increase in outflow through the city of Thun. This caused flooding and bank correction, which has been addressed over the years in different ways, including channeling of the Aare in 1716, a more major correction of the Aare in the 1870s, and a flood relief tunnel in the early 21st century.

== Navigation ==
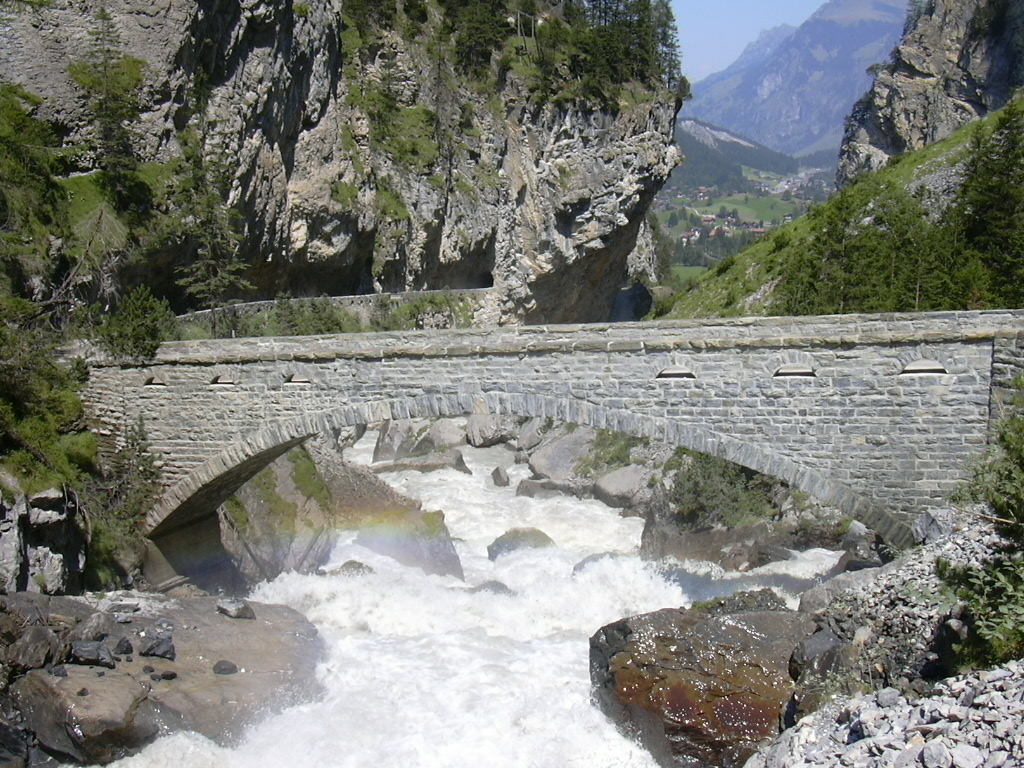
The Kander at Klus, upstream of Kandersteg

With respect to rafting, the Kander is categorized as Class VI: Extreme and Exploratory Rapids on the International Scale of River Difficulty due to the river's numerous rapids and barriers. In 2008, a Swiss Army rafting party's inflatable boats capsized during an attempt to navigate the river; five soldiers were killed.

== See also ==
- Oeschinensee and Kandertal landslides
- List of rivers of Switzerland
