= Hockenhorn =

Mountain in Switzerland

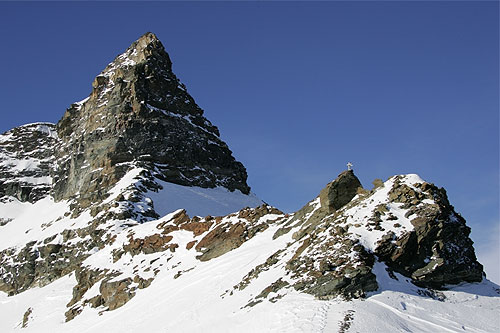

Highest point
- Elevation: 3,293 m (10,804 ft)
- Prominence: 350 m (1,150 ft)
- Parent peak: Finsteraarhorn
- Listing: Alpine mountains above 3000 m
- Coordinates: 46°25′42″N 7°44′39″E

Geography
- Location within Switzerland
- Location: Bern/Valais, Switzerland
- Parent range: Bernese Alps

Climbing
- First ascent: August 1840 (Arthur Thomas Malkin)

The Hockenhorn is a mountain of the Bernese Alps, located on the border between the Swiss cantons of Bern and Valais. Its summit is 3,293 metres high and lies between the upper Kandertal and the Lötschental. On its southern (Valais) side lies a glacier named Milibachgletscher.

The summit of the Hockenhorn is accessible by a trail starting at the Lötschen Pass. The southern side of the mountain is part of a ski area. The closest locality is Lauchernalp above Kippel.
