= Schwarzgrätli =

Coordinates: 46.4369°N 7.6097°E

The signpost at Schwarzgrätli

Schwarzgrätli is a mountain ridge near to the village of Kandersteg in Switzerland. It stands 2,383 m (7,818 ft) above sea level and has a signpost along with a fantastic view.

The view from Schwarzgrätli

Prior to walking this ridge there is another ridge around 2 feet wide with a sheer rock face up to the right and an 800 m (2,600 ft) drop to the left with only a steel cable to hold onto.
