= Kandersteg =

- Municipality
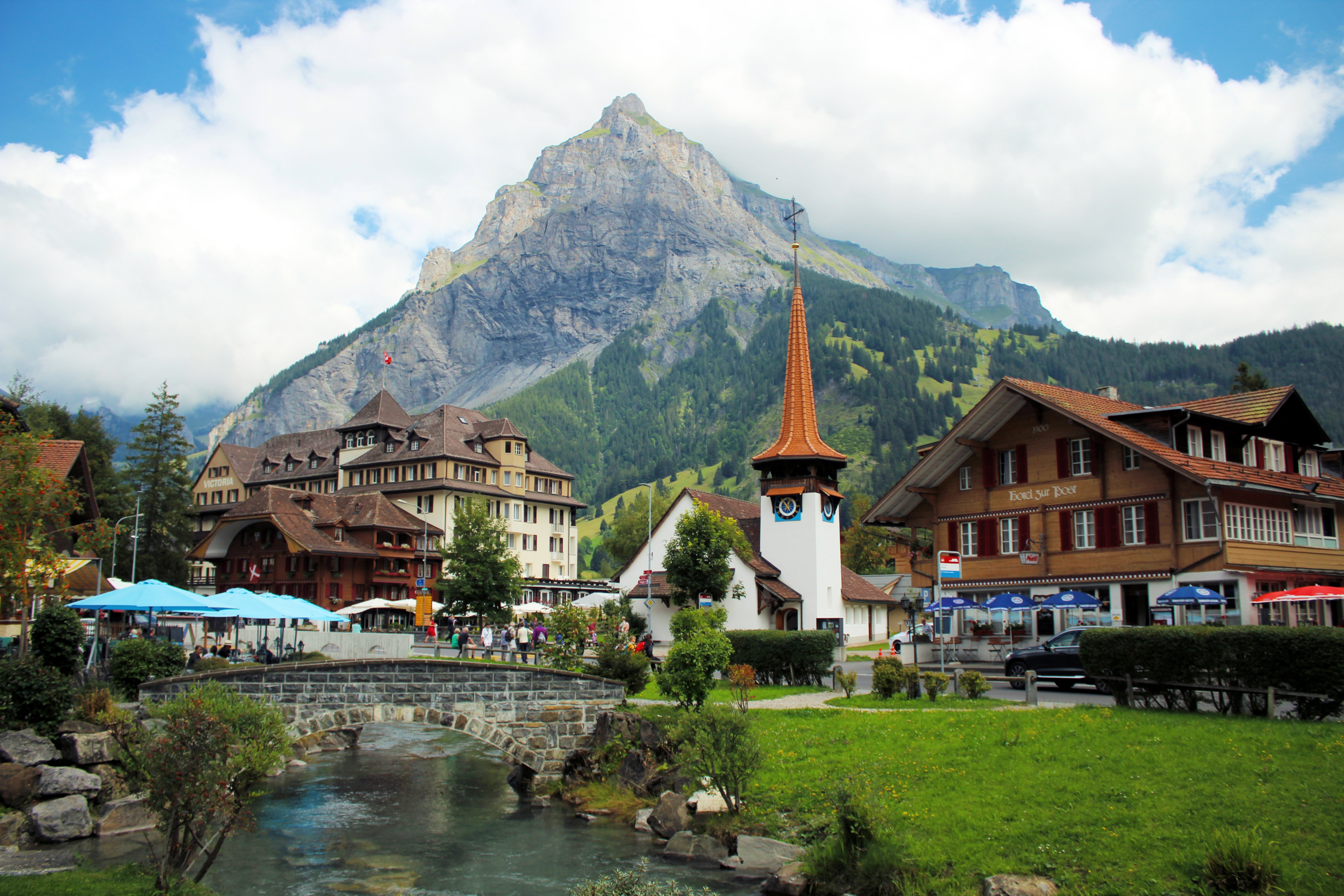
- Kandersteg center with reformed church

- Flag Coat of arms
- Location of Kandersteg
- Location within Switzerland Location within Canton of Bern
- Coordinates: 46°30′N 7°40′E
- Country: Switzerland
- Canton: Bern
- District: Frutigen-Niedersimmental

Government
  - Executive: Gemeinderat with 7 members
  - Mayor: Gemeindepräsident(in); René-François Maeder (as of 2026)

Area
  - Total: 133.9 km^{2} (51.7 sq mi)
- Elevation: 1,174 m (3,852 ft)
- Highest elevation (Balmhorn): 3,698 m (12,133 ft)
- Lowest elevation (Bühl): 1,150 m (3,770 ft)

Population (December 2020)
  - Total: 1,288
  - Density: 9.619/km^{2} (24.91/sq mi)
- Time zone: UTC+01:00 (CET)
  - Summer (DST): UTC+02:00 (CEST)
- Postal code: 3718
- SFOS number: 565
- ISO 3166 code: CH-BE
- Surrounded by: Adelboden, Blatten (Lötschen) (VS), Ferden (VS), Frutigen, Kandergrund, Kippel (VS), Lauterbrunnen, Leukerbad (VS), Reichenbach im Kandertal, Wiler (Lötschen) (VS)
- Website: https://www.gemeindekandersteg.ch/

Kandersteg (Swiss Standard German pronunciation: [ˈkandərˌʃteːk]) is a municipality in the Frutigen-Niedersimmental administrative district in the canton of Bern in Switzerland. It is located along the valley of the River Kander, west of the Jungfrau massif. It is noted for its spectacular mountain scenery and sylvan alpine landscapes. Tourism is a very significant part of its economic life today. It offers outdoor activities year-round, with hiking trails and mountain climbing as well as downhill and cross-country skiing. Kandersteg hosted the ski jumping and Nordic combined parts of the 2018 Nordic Junior World Ski Championships.

== Recent landslide risk ==
There has been a heightened landslide threat in Kandersteg since 2018, when paragliders noticed that Spitzer Stein, a nearby rocky peak, was losing height and that bits of it had broken off. Historically, there have been landslides in the Oeschinen Lake and Kander river valley region. The area's seismic activity calmed down about 3000 years ago, but has now reactivated, and thawing permafrost has weakened rock structures that were previously frozen solid.

Officials have been more closely monitoring the Spitzer Stein after a neighbouring village of Blatten was buried due to a glacier collapse and rockslide on 28 May 2025. The unstable rock at Spitzer Stein is around 16 to 20 million cubic meters, compared to the 9 million cubic meters that fell on Blatten. Monitoring via exploratory drilling and geo-radar measurement indicates movement of a "large to very large" rock mass which, in the summer months, has velocities that exceed 10 cm (4 inches) per day.

Kandersteg has spent over 11 million Swiss francs (US$13.81 million) on preparedness, including two dams on the Öschibach stream and a debris flow network. The area below the Oeschinen Lake landslide scar has been closed off, and paths in the Oeschiwald trail network were closed in July 2025 due to rain causing heavy runoff and debris flows in the Oeschibach stream. Researchers check the mountain using GPS, radar, and drones. Kandersteg relies on GEOTEST for hazard management, the associated geological analyses, and the safety planning. In the event of a major rock movement, residents expect to receive an advance warning of at least 48 hours.

== History ==
Travellers in Kandersteg (1802 illustration by Samuel Weibel)

Kandersteg is first mentioned, together with Kandergrund, in 1352 as der Kandergrund.

Prehistorically the area was lightly settled. However, several late-neolithic or early Bronze Age bows have been found on the Lötschberg glaciers and a Bronze Age needle was found in the Golitschenalp. From the Roman era a bridge and part of a road were discovered in the village.

Until 1909 Kandersteg was politically and religiously part of Kandergrund. In 1511 the parish built a chapel in Kandersteg, which survived the iconoclasm of the Protestant Reformation in 1530. It became a filial church of the parish in Kandergrund between 1840 and 1860 and in 1910 became the parish church of the Kandersteg parish. A Roman Catholic church was built in 1927.

Traditionally the local economy relied on seasonal alpine herding and farming and supporting trade over the alpine passes. In the 17th and 18th centuries sulfur mining began in the Oeschinenalp. A match factory opened in the village in the 19th century to take advantage of the sulfur. Beginning around 1850, the municipality grew into a tourist destination. Between 1855 and 1890 five hotels opened and by 1913 there were 19 hotels. The population grew dramatically during construction of the Lötschberg Tunnel and the Lötschberg railway line between 1906 and 1913. The new railroad line and tunnel allowed ever increasing numbers of tourists to visit Kandersteg. A chair lift to Oeschinen Lake opened in 1948, followed by a cable car to the valley floor in 1951. A ski jump was built in 1979. The Kandersteg International Scout Centre opened in 1923.

== Geography ==
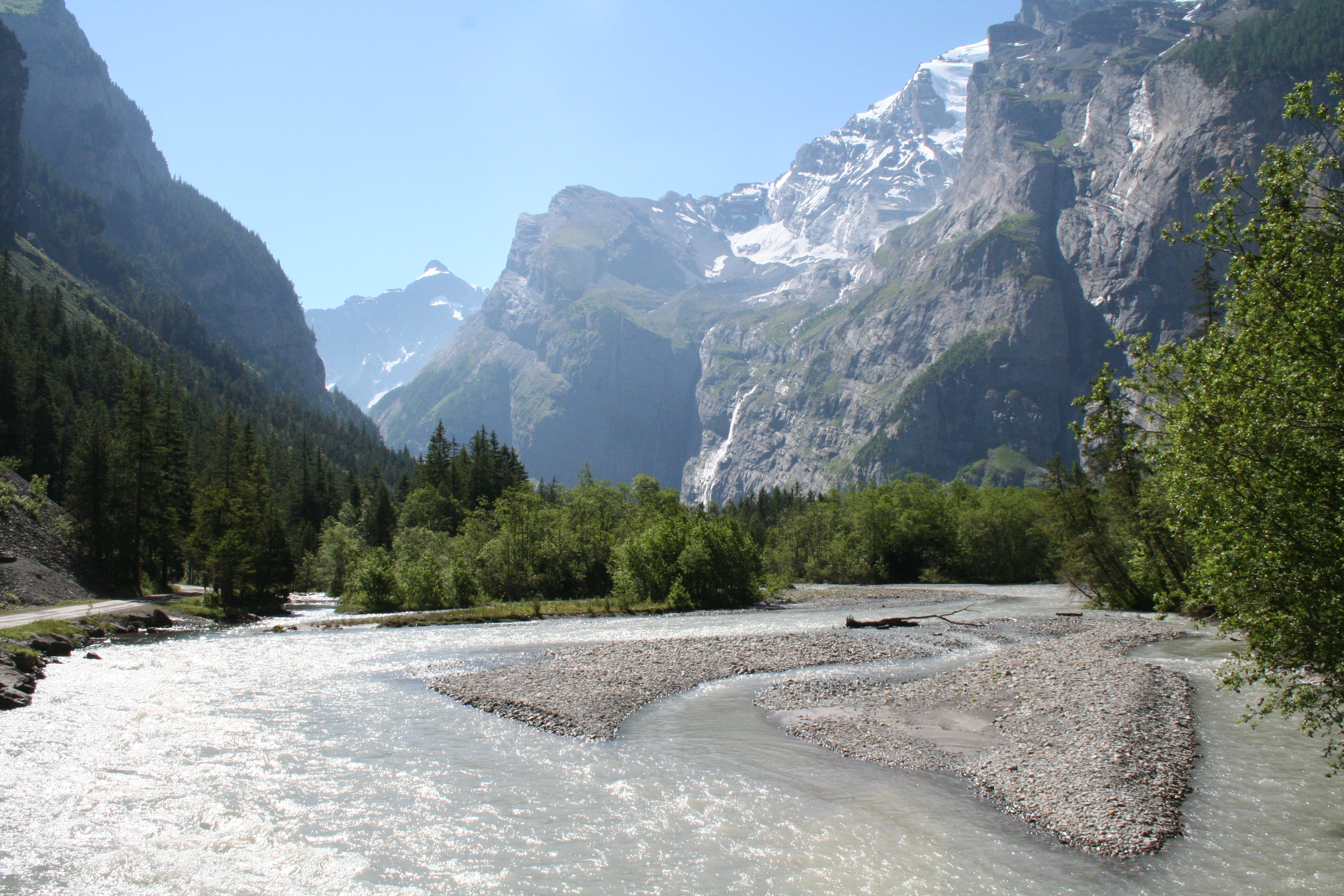
The upper Kander in the Gastern valley

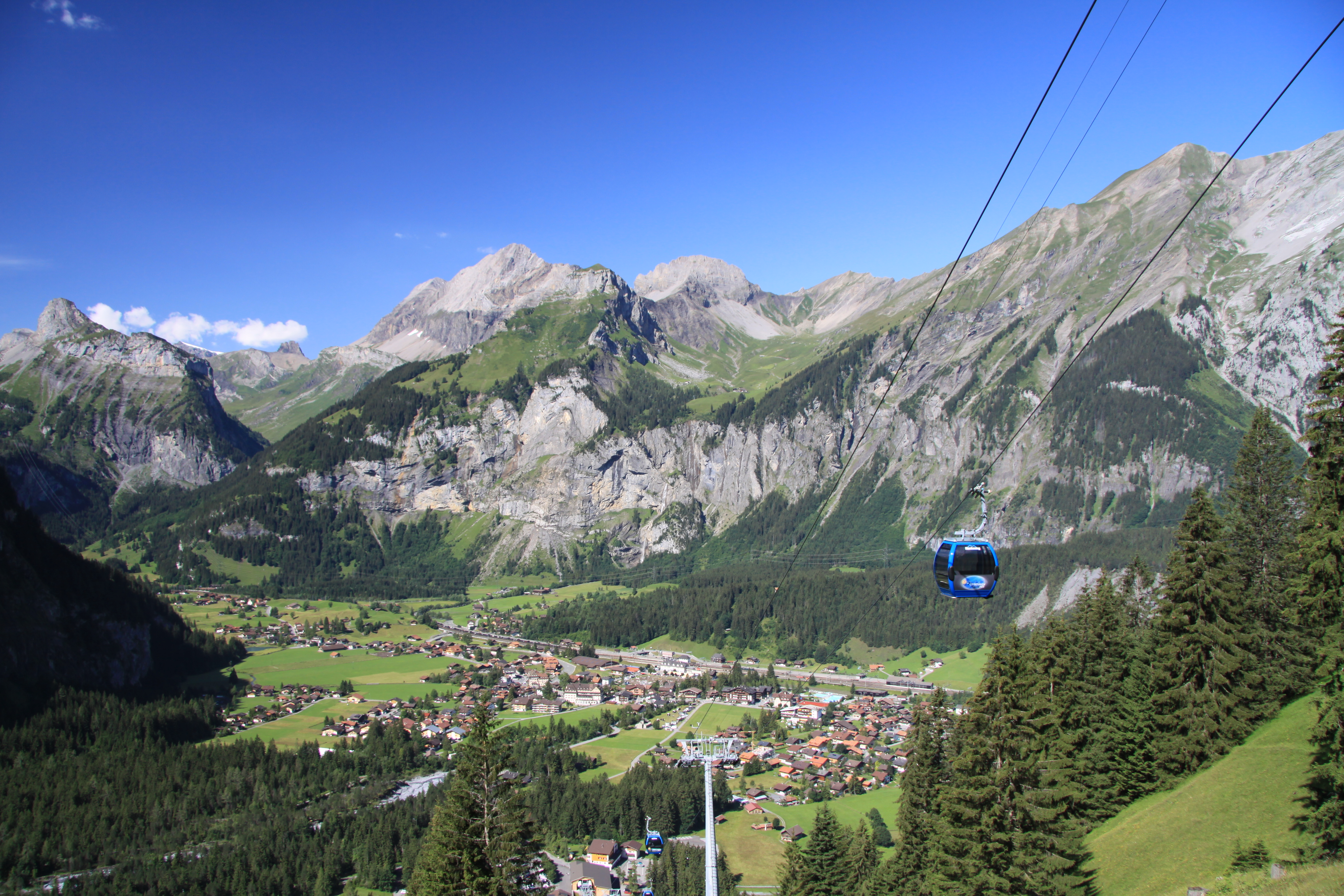
View of Kandersteg from the east

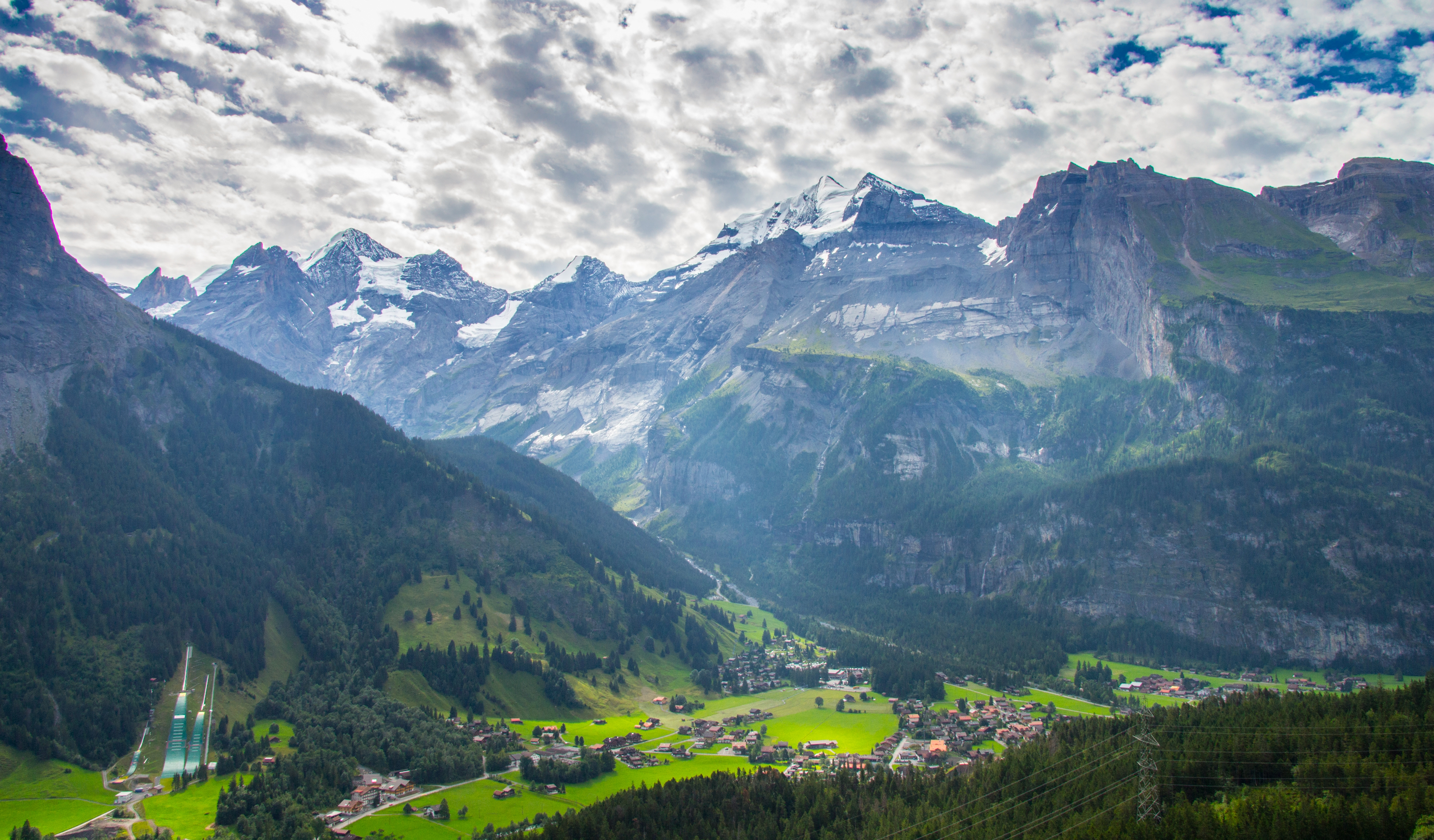
View of Kandersteg from the west with the Blüemlisalp and Doldenhorn

Kandersteg is located on the northern side of the Bernese Alps at an altitude of 1,200 meters (3,900 ft) above sea level at the foot of the Lötschen and Gemmi Passes. The village, with 1200 inhabitants, lies in the upper Kander Valley. The municipality extends over a territory encompassing the valleys of Gastern (upper Kander Valley) and Oeschinen. It includes the villages of Kandersteg and Gastern.

Kandersteg is surrounded by high mountains. The Balmhorn (3,698 m [12,133 ft]), bordering the canton of Valais to the south, is the highest in the valley; it is followed by the Blüemlisalp (3,663 m [12,018 ft]), east of the village. The Gross Lohner (3,049 m [10,003 ft]) is the highest summit between the Kander Valley and the valley of Adelboden on the west.

The Bunderchrinde Pass (2,385 m [7,825 ft]) connects Kandersteg to Adelboden, whilst the Hohtürli Pass (2,778 m [9,114 ft]) on the east connects Kandersteg to Griesalp in the Kiental valley. Neither pass carries a road, but both form part of the Alpine Pass Route, a long-distance hiking trail across Switzerland between Sargans and Montreux that passes through the village.

The largest lake in the valley is lake Oeschinen. It is located at 1,578 m (5,177 ft) east of Kandersteg, at the foot of the Blüemlisalp massif. The Gastern Valley is an almost closed off valley. At the upper end of the valley lies the Kander Glacier, the source of the 44 km (27 mi) long Kander river. The Gastern Valley is on the way to the 2,700 m [8,900 ft] high Lötschen Pass.

Part of the municipality is located within the Jungfrau-Aletsch area, declared a UNESCO World Heritage Site in 2001 and extended in 2007. The area comprises Lake Oeschinen and the Gastern Valley.

Kandersteg has an area of 134.33 km^{2} (51.87 sq mi). Of this area, 17.84 km^{2} (6.89 mi^{2}) or 13.3% is used for agricultural purposes, while 15.86 km^{2} (6.12 mi^{2}) or 11.8% is forested. Of the rest of the land, 1.33 km^{2} (0.51 mi^{2}) or 1.0% is settled (buildings or roads), 2.5 km^{2} (0.97 mi^{2}) or 1.9% is either rivers or lakes and 96.96 km^{2} (37.44 mi^{2}) or 72.1% is unproductive land.

Of the built up area, housing and buildings make up 0.4% and transportation infrastructure make up 0.4%. Of the forested land, 8.8% of the total land area is heavily forested and 1.3% is covered with orchards or small clusters of trees. Of the agricultural land, 1.2% is pastures and 12.0% is used for alpine pastures. Of the water in the municipality, 1.0% is in lakes and 0.9% is in rivers and streams. Of the unproductive areas, 10.4% is unproductive vegetation, 43.1% is too rocky for vegetation and 18.6% of the land is covered by glaciers.

The municipality is located in the upper most section of the Kander river valley, along with parts of the Gastern and Oeschinen valleys and part of the Blümlisalp mountain. It consists of the Bäuert of Kandersteg, which includes the village of Kandersteg and the Bäuert of Gastern.

On 31 December 2009 Amtsbezirk Frutigen, the municipality's former district, was dissolved. On the following day, 1 January 2010, it joined the newly created Verwaltungskreis Frutigen-Niedersimmental.

== Coat of arms ==
The blazon of the municipal coat of arms is Azure a Foot-bridge in pale Or and in chief Argent an Eagle displayed Sable.

== Demographics ==
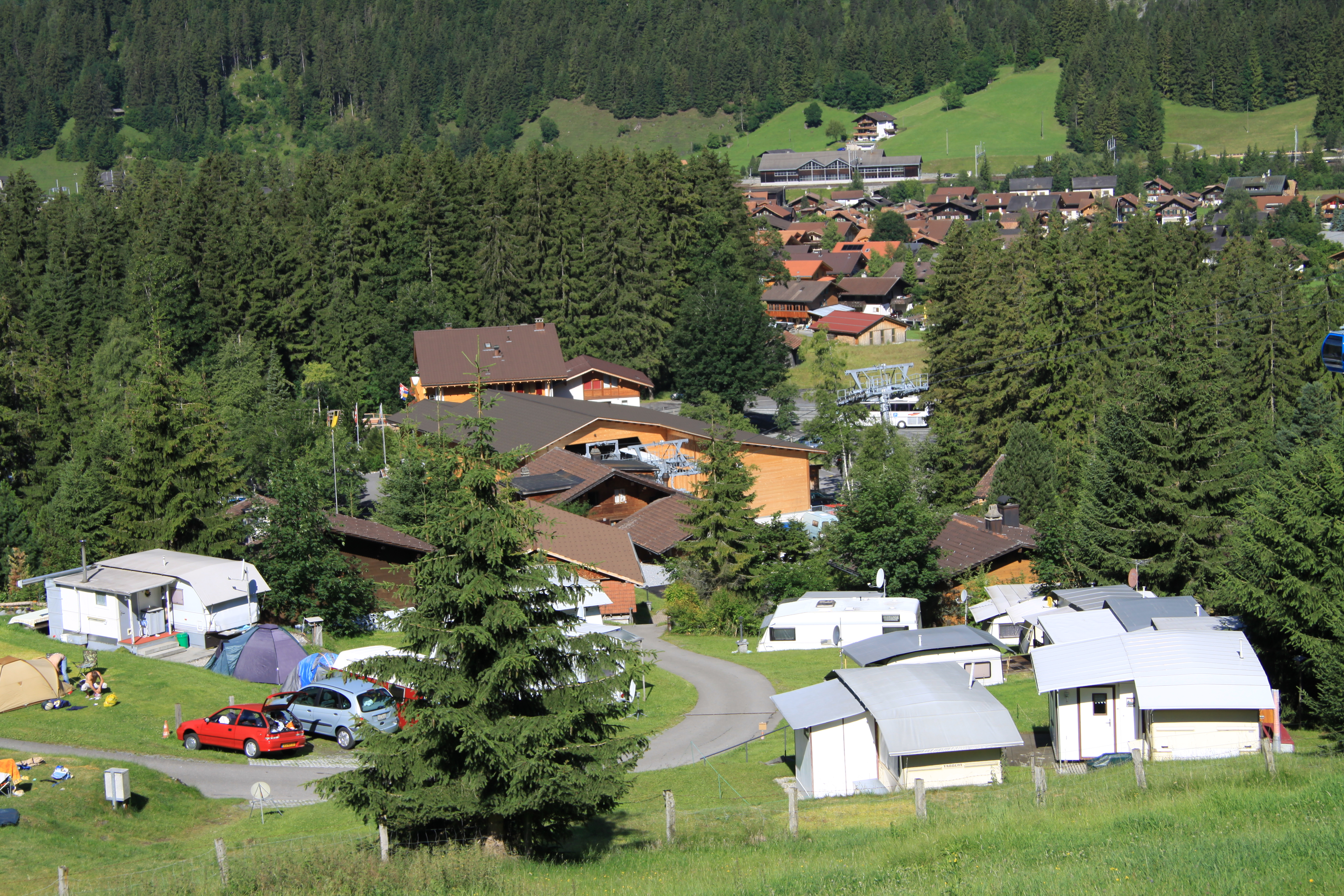
Houses, cabins and tents in Kandersteg during the summer

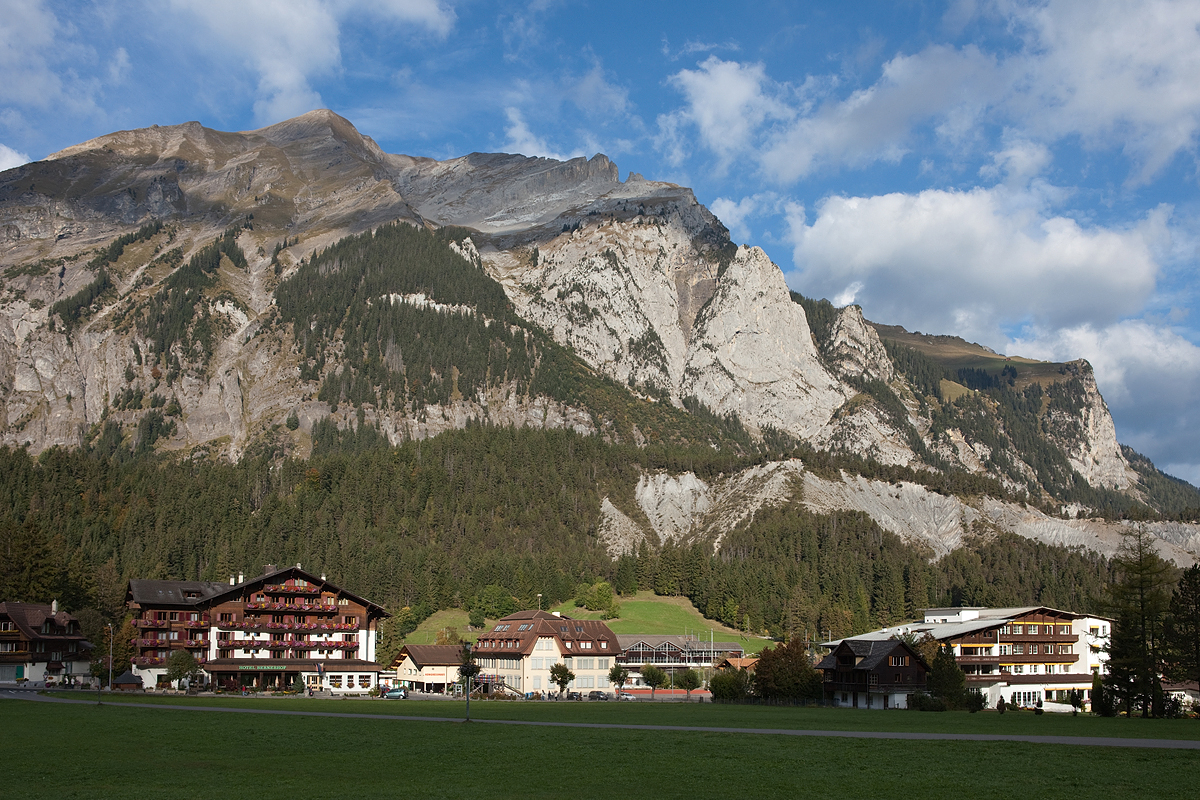
Main street in Kandersteg

Kandersteg has a population (as of December 2020) of 1,288. As of 2010, 17.9% of the population are resident foreign nationals. Over the last 10 years (2000-2010) the population has changed at a rate of 4.3%. Migration accounted for 9.7%, while births and deaths accounted for -4.5%.

Most of the population (as of 2000) speaks German (1,022 or 89.9%) as their first language, Portuguese is the second most common (32 or 2.8%) and English is the third (13 or 1.1%). There are 12 people who speak French, 5 people who speak Italian.

As of 2008, the population was 48.3% male and 51.7% female. The population was made up of 486 Swiss men (39.5% of the population) and 108 (8.8%) non-Swiss men. There were 525 Swiss women (42.6%) and 112 (9.1%) non-Swiss women. Of the population in the municipality, 403 or about 35.4% were born in Kandersteg and lived there in 2000. There were 355 or 31.2% who were born in the same canton, while 154 or 13.5% were born somewhere else in Switzerland, and 181 or 15.9% were born outside of Switzerland.

As of 2010, children and teenagers (0–19 years old) make up 16.2% of the population, while adults (20–64 years old) make up 61.9% and seniors (over 64 years old) make up 21.9%.

As of 2000, there were 436 people who were single and never married in the municipality. There were 597 married individuals, 72 widows or widowers and 32 individuals who are divorced.

As of 2000, there were 166 households that consist of only one person and 27 households with five or more people. In 2000, a total of 467 apartments (48.5% of the total) were permanently occupied, while 434 apartments (45.1%) were seasonally occupied and 61 apartments (6.3%) were empty. As of 2010, the construction rate of new housing units was 32.5 new units per 1000 residents. The vacancy rate for the municipality, in 2011, was 3.8%.

The historical population is given in the following chart:

The population rose sharply between 1906 and 1913 with the construction of the Lötschberg railway line.

== Heritage sites of national significance ==
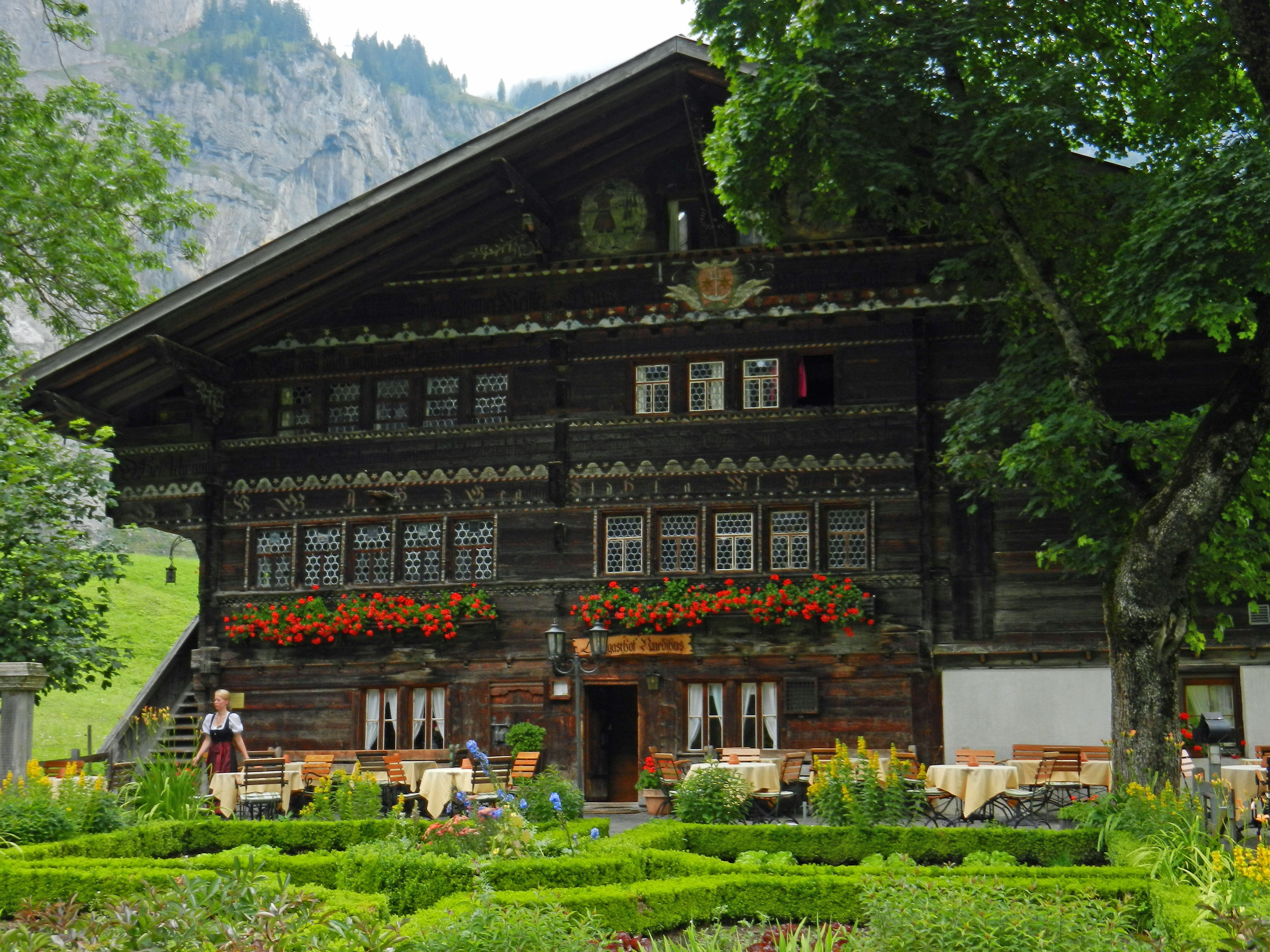
Gasthof Ruedihaus

The hotel and restaurant or Gasthof Ruedihaus is listed as a Swiss heritage site of national significance.

== Politics ==
In the 2015 federal election the most popular party was the Swiss People's Party (SVP) which received 48.5% of the vote. The next three most popular parties were the Conservative Democratic Party (BDP) (13.7%), the Social Democratic Party (SP) (11.9%) and the FDP.The Liberals (7.7%). In the federal election, a total of 531 votes were cast, and the voter turnout was 57.6%.

== Economy ==
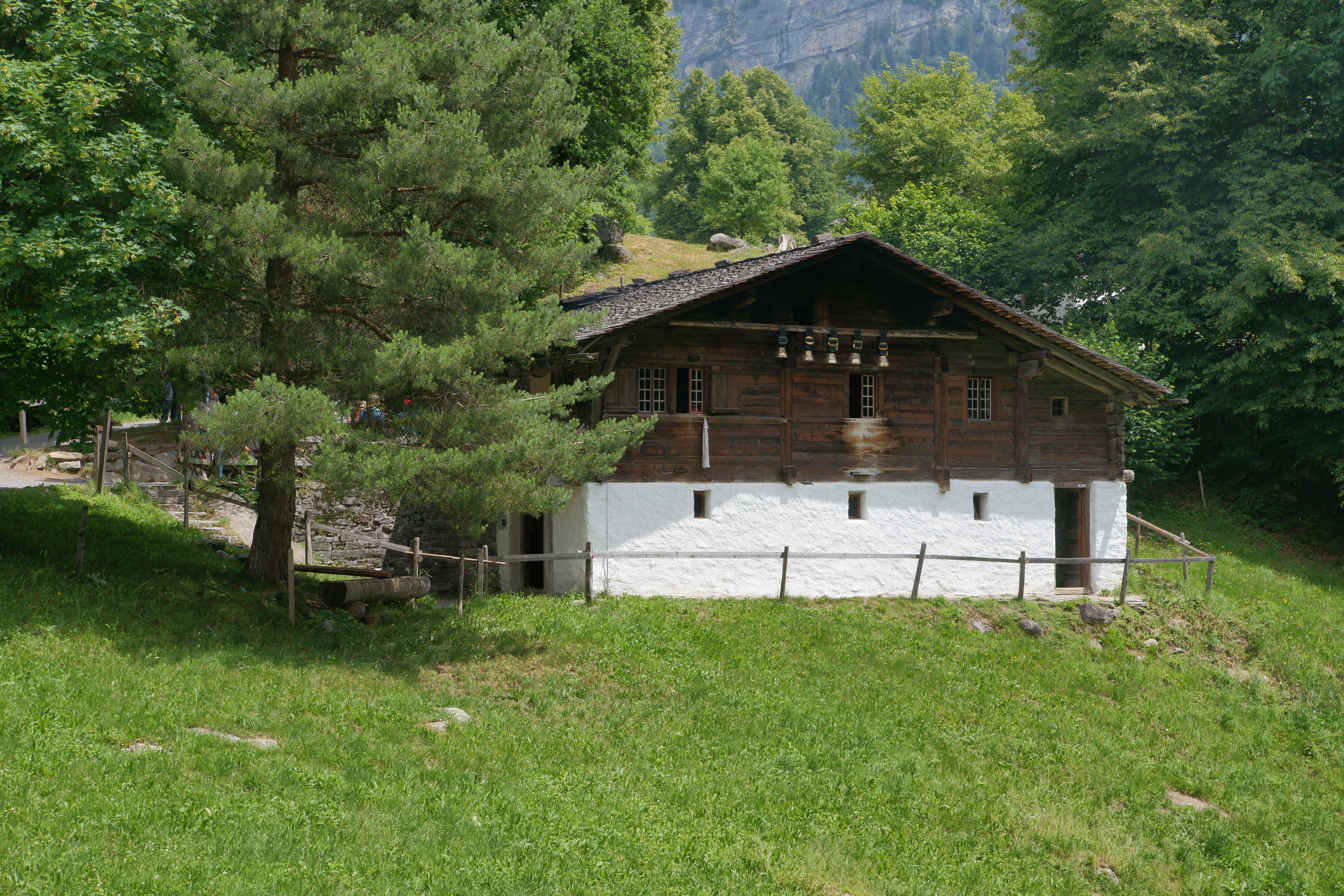
Alpine dairy in Kandersteg

As of 2012, there were a total of 678 people employed in the municipality. Of these, 44 were employed in the primary economic sector and there were about 15 businesses involved in this sector. 99 people were employed in the secondary sector and there were 21 businesses in this sector. 535 people were employed in the tertiary sector, with 104 businesses in this sector.

As of 2011, Kandersteg had an unemployment rate of 2.57%. As of 2008, there were a total of 647 people employed in the municipality. Of these, 46 were employed in the primary economic sector and there were about 16 businesses involved in this sector. 81 people were employed in the secondary sector and there were 14 businesses in this sector. 520 people were employed in the tertiary sector, with 76 businesses in this sector. There were 617 residents of the municipality who were employed in some capacity, of which females made up 43.1% of the workforce.

In 2008 there were a total of 527 full-time equivalent jobs. The number of jobs in the primary sector was 22, all of which were in agriculture. The number of jobs in the secondary sector was 71 of which 9 or (12.7%) were in manufacturing and 55 (77.5%) were in construction. The number of jobs in the tertiary sector was 434. In the tertiary sector, 50 (11.5%) were in wholesale or retail sales or the repair of motor vehicles, 58 (13.4%) were in the movement and storage of goods, 264 (60.8%) were in a hotel or restaurant, 6 (1.4%) were in the insurance or financial industry, 7 (1.6%) were in education and 20 (4.6%) were in health care.

In 2000, there were 175 workers who commuted into the municipality and 174 workers who commuted away; thus, by an extremely small margin the municipality is a net importer of workers. Of the working population, 9.6% used public transportation to get to work, and 37% used a private car.

== Religion ==
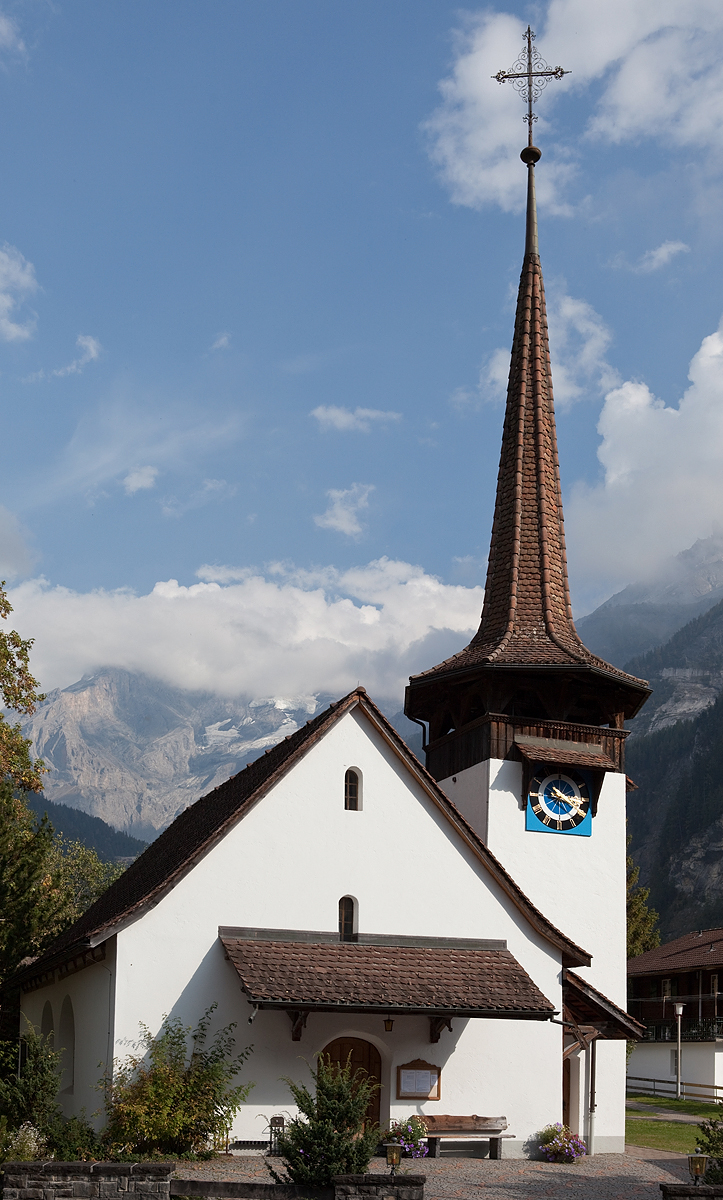
Swiss Reformed Church in Kandersteg

From the 2000 census, 840 or 73.9% belonged to the Swiss Reformed Church, while 154 or 13.5% were Roman Catholic. Of the rest of the population, there were 12 members of an Orthodox church (or about 1.06% of the population), and there were 27 individuals (or about 2.37% of the population) who belonged to another Christian church. There were 12 (or about 1.06% of the population) who were Islamic. There was 1 individual who belonged to another church. 53 (or about 4.66% of the population) belonged to no church, are agnostic or atheist, and 51 individuals (or about 4.49% of the population) did not answer the question.

== Climate ==
Between 1981 and 2010 Kandersteg had an average of 139.2 days of rain or snow per year and on average received 1,194 mm (47.0 in) of precipitation. The wettest month was July, when Kandersteg had an average of 147 mm (5.8 in) of rain or snow. During this month there was precipitation for an average of 13.5 days. The month with the most days of precipitation was June, with an average of 14.1, but with only 131 mm (5.2 in) of rain or snow. The driest month of the year was February with an average of 68 mm (2.7 in) of precipitation over 9.6 days.

== Education ==
In Kandersteg about 509 or (44.8%) of the population have completed non-mandatory upper secondary education, and 106 or (9.3%) have completed additional higher education (either university or a Fachhochschule). Of the 106 who completed tertiary schooling, 51.9% were Swiss men, 19.8% were Swiss women, 17.9% were non-Swiss men and 10.4% were non-Swiss women.

The Canton of Bern school system provides one year of non-obligatory Kindergarten, followed by six years of primary school. This is followed by three years of obligatory lower secondary school where the students are streamed according to ability and aptitude. After lower secondary school students may attend additional schooling or they may enter an apprenticeship.

During the 2010-11 school year, there were a total of 86 students attending classes in Kandersteg. There was one kindergarten class with a total of 18 students in the municipality. Of the kindergarten students, 27.8% were permanent or temporary residents of Switzerland (not citizens) and 22.2% have a different mother language than the classroom language. The municipality had 3 primary classes and 68 students. Of the primary students, 13.2% were permanent or temporary residents of Switzerland (not citizens) and 14.7% have a different mother language than the classroom language.

As of 2000, there was one student in Kandersteg who came from another municipality, while 49 residents attended schools outside the municipality.

== Tourism ==
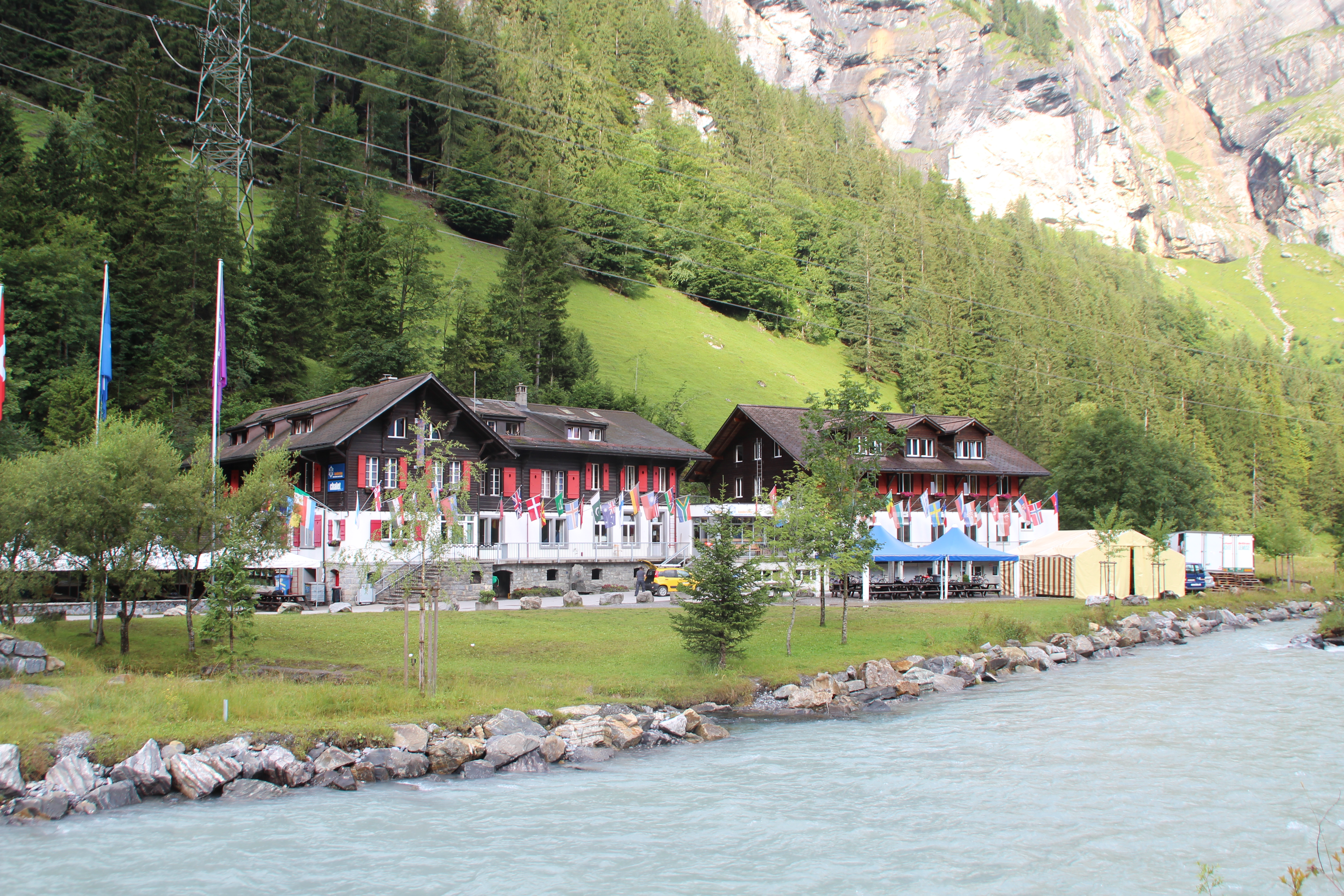
Kandersteg International Scout Centre

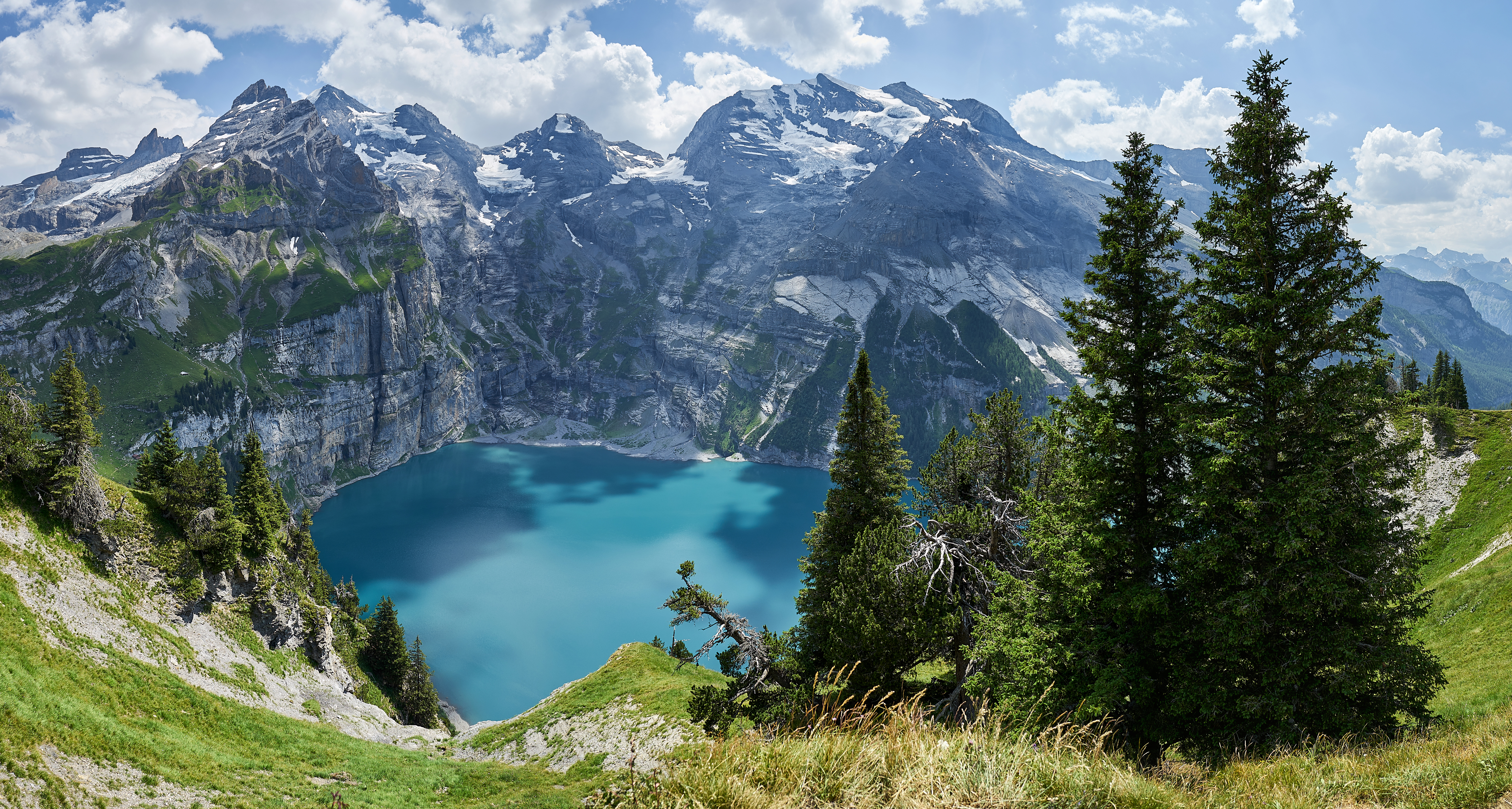
Lake Oeschinen

A broad spectrum of accommodation characterises the village: from 5-star hotel to holiday apartments and camp sites. Kandersteg International Scout Centre is located at the edge of the village. More than 16,000 Scouts from all over the world visit each year. The centre is run by a multi-national scouting volunteer team, called the "Pinkies". Several mountain huts belonging to the Swiss Alpine Club are located in the valley.

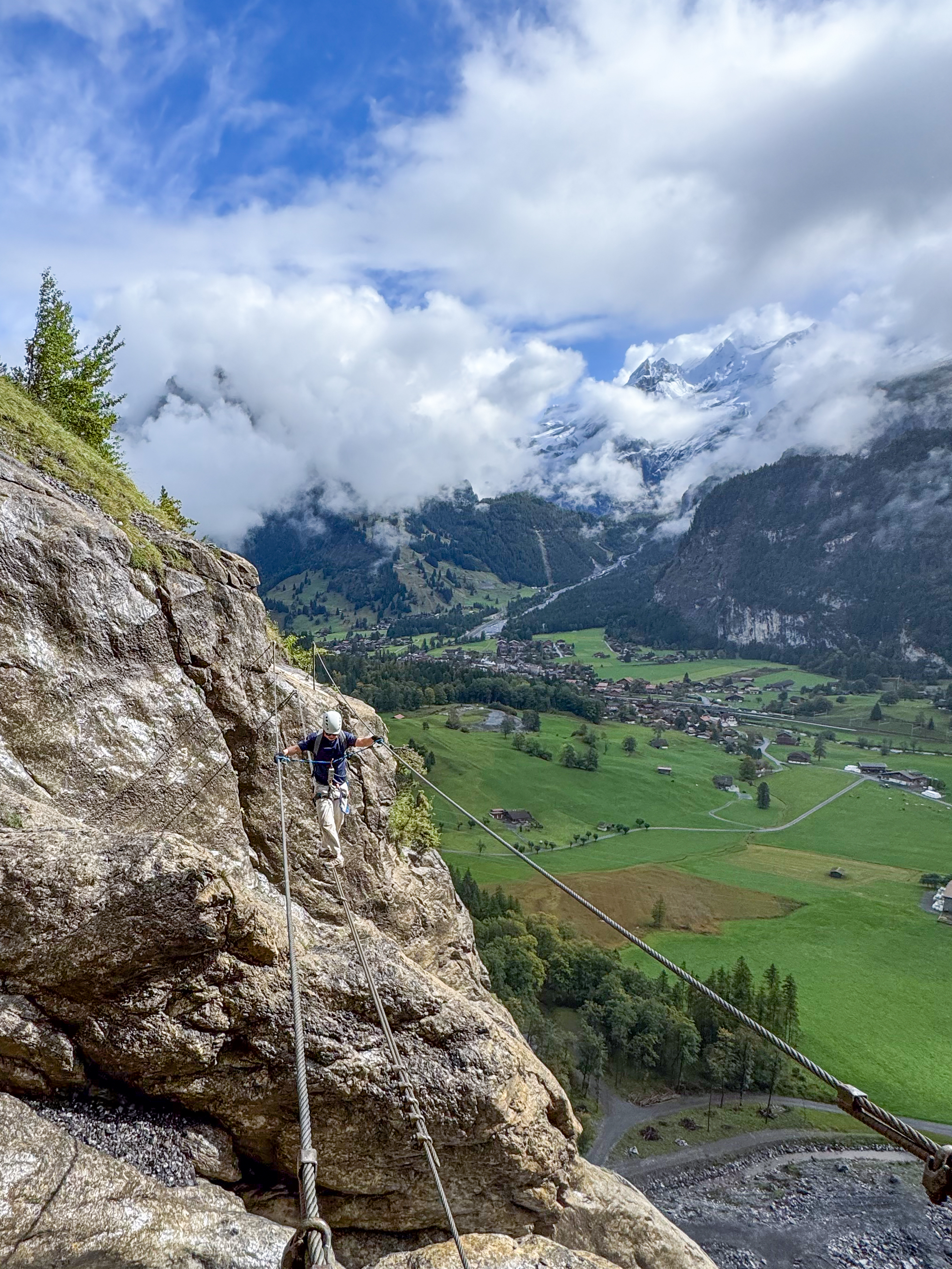
Via ferrata near Allmenalp

The Kander Valley has an extensive network of hiking trails from the valley floor to the mountaintops and passes. The most famous routes lead to the canton of Valais, across the Gemmi Pass straight to Leukerbad (with cable cars operating at each end) or through the wild Gastern valley across the higher Lötschen Pass to the Lötschental.

Lake Oeschinen is considered one of the most attractive in Switzerland and can be accessed by the Kandersteg-Oeschinen cablecar which replaced the chairlift that operated until 7 September 2008. Other cablecars serve the areas of Sunnbüel and Allmenalp.

In winter over 50 kilometers (31 mi) of cross-country skiing trails (classic and skating) are available in the valley floor and higher up. Small downhill ski areas are located near Lake Oeschinen and Sunnbüel. A winter trail network connects the village to Blausee and to the Gemmi Pass. Other winter activities include skating, curling, ice climbing and ice fishing.

Near Kandersteg is located the Ricola Alpine garden. Other attractions in the village include a 16th-century parish church.

== Transport ==
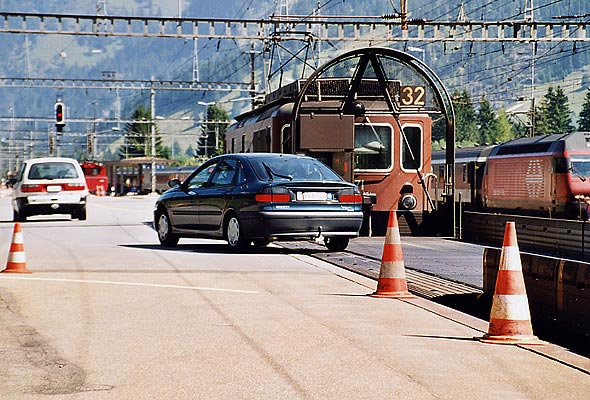
BLS car shuttle train at Kandersteg.

Kandersteg owes its development as a tourist destination to its good transport links at the northern end of the Lötschberg Tunnel, which is part of the Lötschberg line, a major railway line across the Alps.

Kandersteg railway station is located in the village, and is the first station to the north of the tunnel, through which trains run for 15 kilometres (9.3 mi) to emerge at Goppenstein in eastern Valais. Road vehicles can be carried through the tunnel to Goppenstein by open sided car shuttle trains.

Since 2007, the new Lötschberg Base Tunnel has connected Frutigen with Raron. As a result, the old Lötschberg line is used much less intensively. Nowadays, hourly regional express trains operate between Bern and Brig via Spiez, and freight trains continue to run on the mountain railway.

The municipality is also served by PostAuto bus services down the Kandertal to Mitholz, Blausee, Kandergrund and Frutigen, and up the Gastertal to Selden.

== See also ==
- Kandersteg International Scout Centre
- Schwarzgrätli
