= Simme =

Tributary of the river Kander in the Bernese Oberland

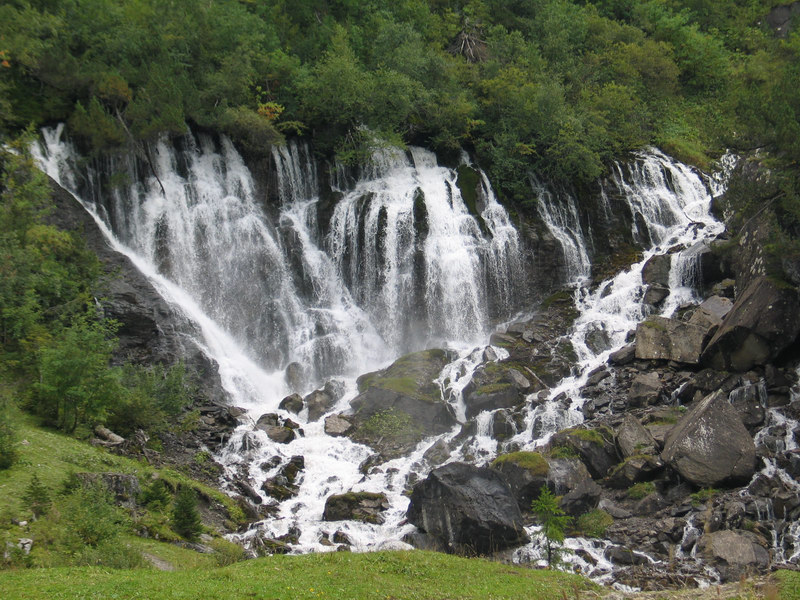
- Bi de Sibe Brünne ("At the Seven Springs"), just below the Flueschafberg cliffs

Location
- Country: Switzerland

Physical characteristics
- Mouth: Kander
  - coordinates: 46.6907°N 7.6328°E

Basin features
- Progression: Kander→ Aare→ Rhine→ North Sea

The river Simme (German pronunciation: [ˈzɪmə]) is a tributary of the river Kander in the Bernese Oberland in the canton of Bern in Switzerland. It is approximately 60 kilometres (37 mi) long and has a catchment area of 594 square kilometres (229 mi^{2}).

The river Simme begins at the Alpine lake of Flueseeli (lit.: "Little Lake of the Flue") (2,045 m (6,709 ft)) on the secluded Alpine meadow just above the Flueschafberg cliffs. But right afterwards, one level and 600 metres (2,000 ft) lower, below the Flueschafberg cliffs, on the Alpine meadow called Rezliberg, it converges with several creeks which have even higher springs, such as the Truebbach, the Rezligletscherbach, and the Ammertenbach. This area is located west of the mountain range Wildstrubel, and to the north of and below the Glacier de la Plaine Morte (2,700 m (8,900 ft)), and about 7 kilometres (4.3 mi) south of the resort of Lenk. Underneath the Rezliberg it forms the Simmenfälle, several waterfalls, which have, altogether, a drop of 200 metres (660 ft).

The river then flows roughly to the north and passes Lenk and flows towards Zweisimmen through the Obersimmental (Upper Simme Valley), where it converges with the Kleine Simme from the west, which origines in the mountains above Saanenmöser. Saanenmöser is also a small pass towards Saanen and Gstaad.

From Zweisimmen the Simme flows further north until Riedenbach where it smoothly turns east and runs now through the Niedersimmental (Lower Simme Valley). In Oey it converges with the Chirel of the Diemtigtal from the south.

After the village of Wimmis and southwest of Spiez, the Simme turns north again and joins the river Kander, which reaches the Lake Thun after 3 kilometres (1.9 mi)).

== See also ==
- List of rivers of Switzerland
