= Oeschinen Lake =

Lake in the Bernese Oberland, Switzerland

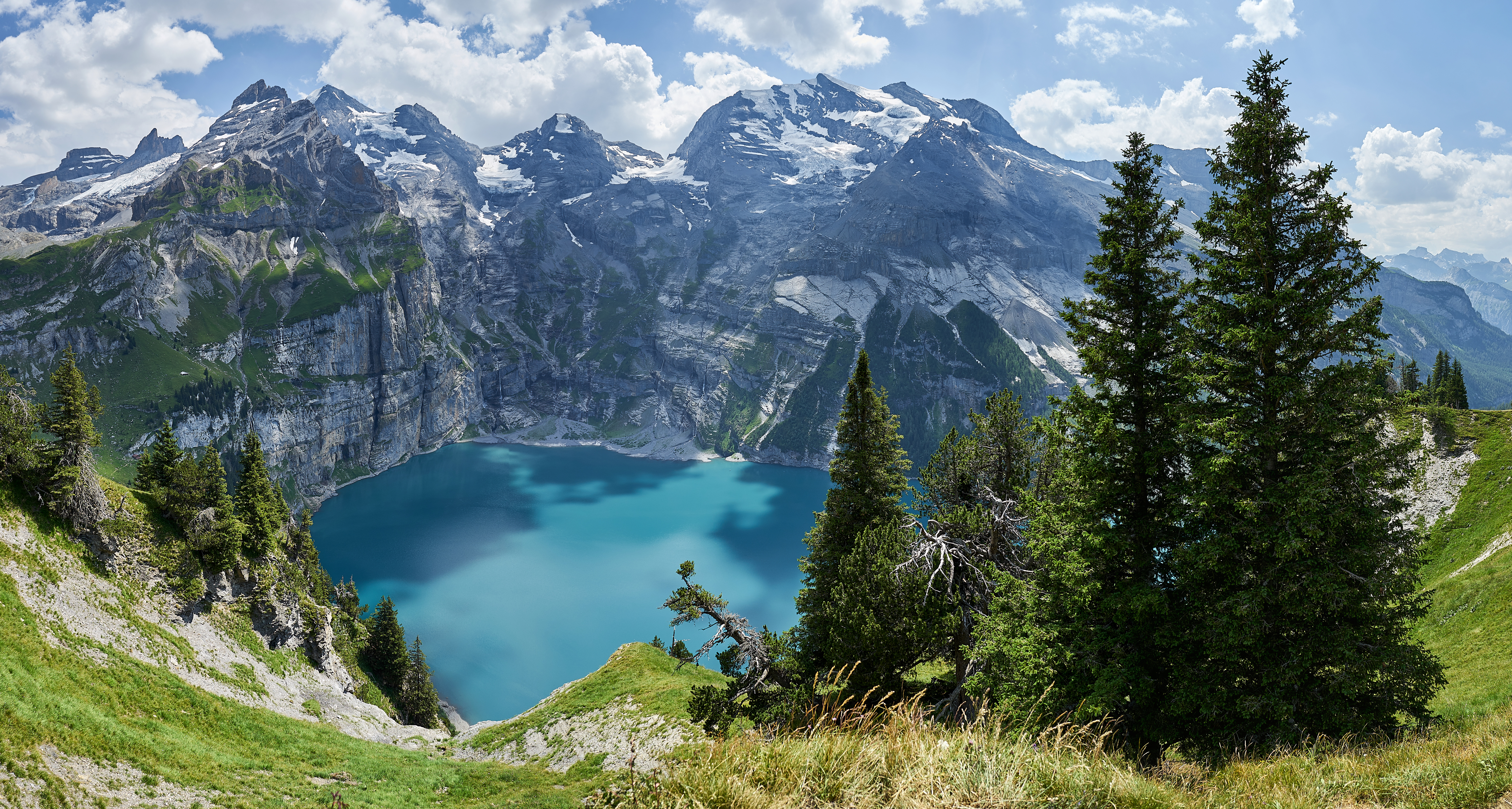
- Oeschinen Lake from Heuberg. View towards the Blüemlisalp and the Doldenhorn.

- Location within Switzerland Location within Canton of Bern Location within Alps
- Interactive map of Oeschinen Lake
- Location: Kandersteg, canton of Bern
- Coordinates: 46°29′54″N 07°43′37″E
- Type: oligotrophic, holomictic
- Primary inflows: Bärglibach, Wyssbach, Lägerbach, Oeschinenbach
- Primary outflows: underground
- Catchment area: 22 km^{2} (8.5 sq mi)
- Basin countries: Switzerland
- Surface area: 1.115 km^{2} (0.431 sq mi)
- Max. depth: 56 m (184 ft)
- Residence time: 588 days
- Surface elevation: 1,578 m (5,177 ft)

Oeschinen Lake (German: Oeschinensee) is a mountain lake in the Bernese Oberland, Switzerland, located above the village of Kandersteg. It lies at an elevation of 1,578 metres (5,177 ft), covers 1.115 km² (0.43 sq mi), and reaches a maximum depth of 56 metres (184 ft). The lake was formed by prehistoric landslides. Since 2007 it has formed part of the Swiss Alps Jungfrau–Aletsch UNESCO World Heritage Site.

== History ==
Large prehistoric landslides (the Oeschinensee and Kandertal landslides) in the upper Kander valley created the natural dam between Kandersteg and Kandergrund, which impounded Oeschinen Lake. Geological research attributes the deposits either to a rock avalanche from the northern flank of the Doldenhorn, or to an older rock avalanche from the Fisistock.

In the 17th and 18th centuries, sulfur was mined on the Oeschinenalp. With the rise of Alpinism after 1850, tourism developed in Kandersteg and the Oeschinensee valley, leading to the construction of hotels and, in 1948, a chairlift linking the village to the lake.

== Rockfall hazard ==
At the Spitzen Stein (2,974 m), a rocky summit above Oeschinen Lake and Kandersteg, rockfalls have long been observed, but experts report that instability has increased in recent years, partly due to thawing permafrost linked to climate change.

In May 2020, authorities closed parts of the south shore after geologists warned that large rockfalls from the Spitzen Stein could reach the lake. In 2021, smaller rockfalls and ongoing warnings led to the closure of hiking trails and sectors directly below the mountain.

Conditions worsened in July 2025, when prolonged rainfall accelerated movements on the slope and triggered collapses and debris-laden runoff in the Oeschibach, leading to the closure of numerous trails in the Oeschiwald area. A few days later, officials reported that slope movements had slowed, but some trails in the area remained closed as a precaution.

== Tourism ==
Lake Oeschinen is a popular destination in the Bernese Oberland and is part of the Swiss Alps Jungfrau–Aletsch UNESCO World Heritage Site. The lake is accessible by gondola lift from Kandersteg, and from the top station it is about a 30-minute walk to the shore.

The surrounding area offers hiking trails, including routes to the Heuberg and the Fründenhütte. Trails may be closed in some seasons due to snow or rockfall. In winter, when conditions allow, ice walks are created across the frozen lake. Rowing boats are available for rent from May to October, and in summer the lake is also used for bathing.

== Transport ==
A gondola lift from Kandersteg leads to Oeschinen Lake. The top station is 25 minutes away by foot from the lake. A bus links the valley station of the gondola lift with Kandersteg railway station.

== Gallery ==
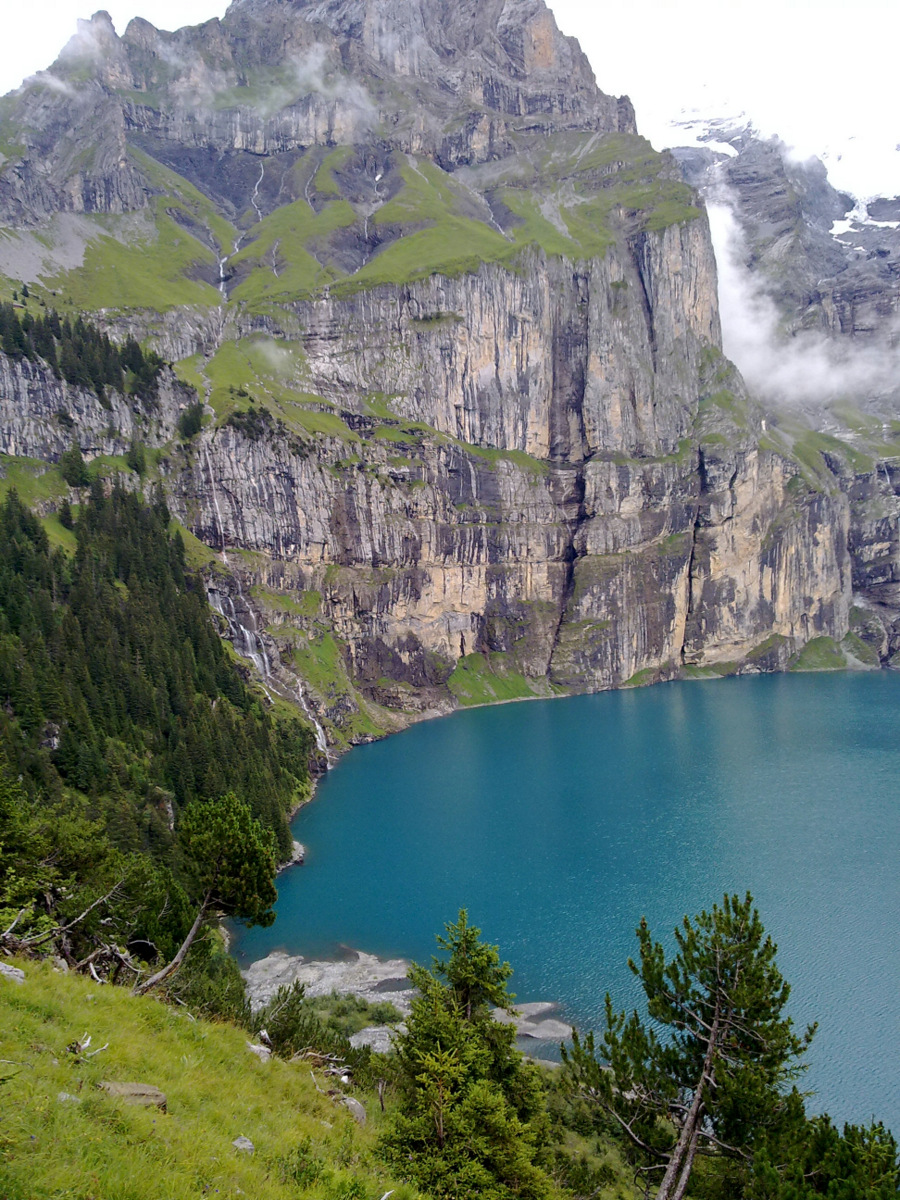

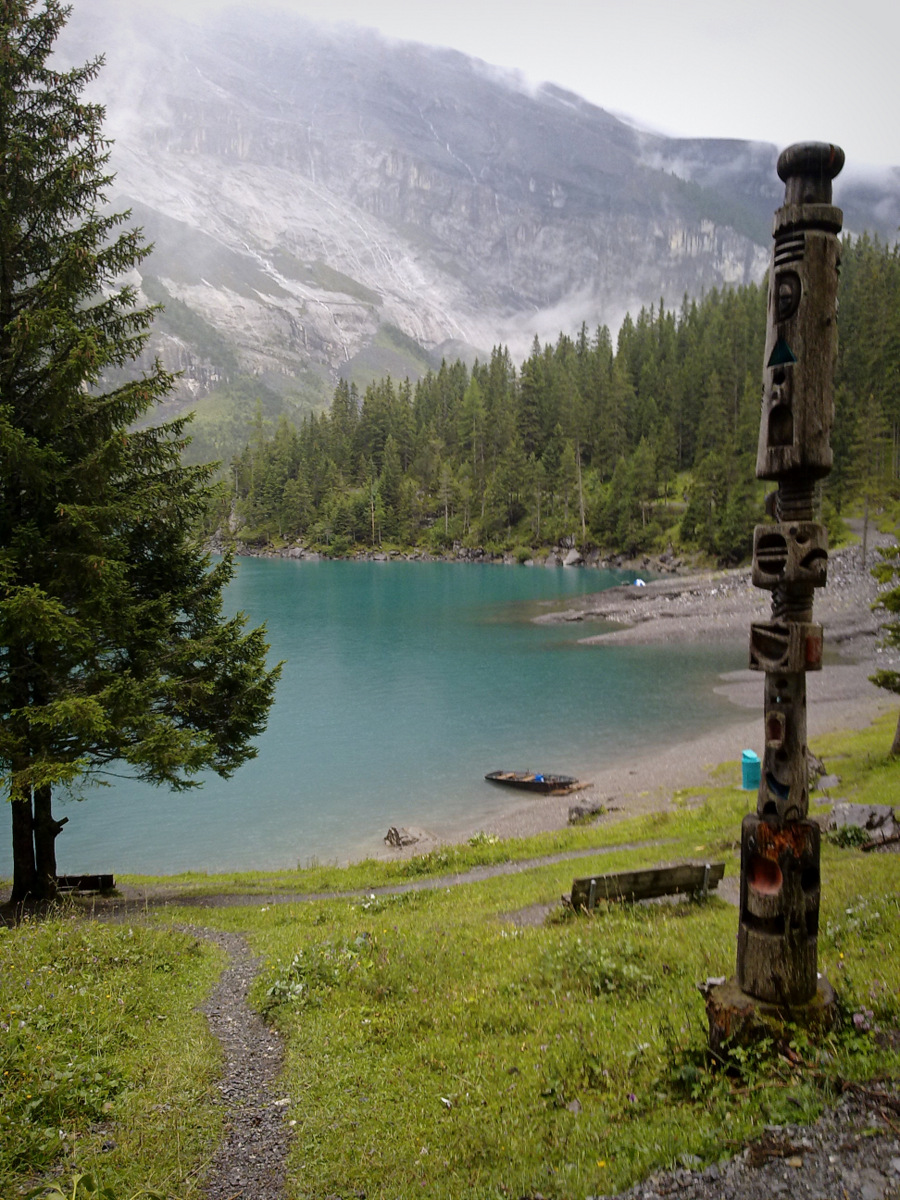

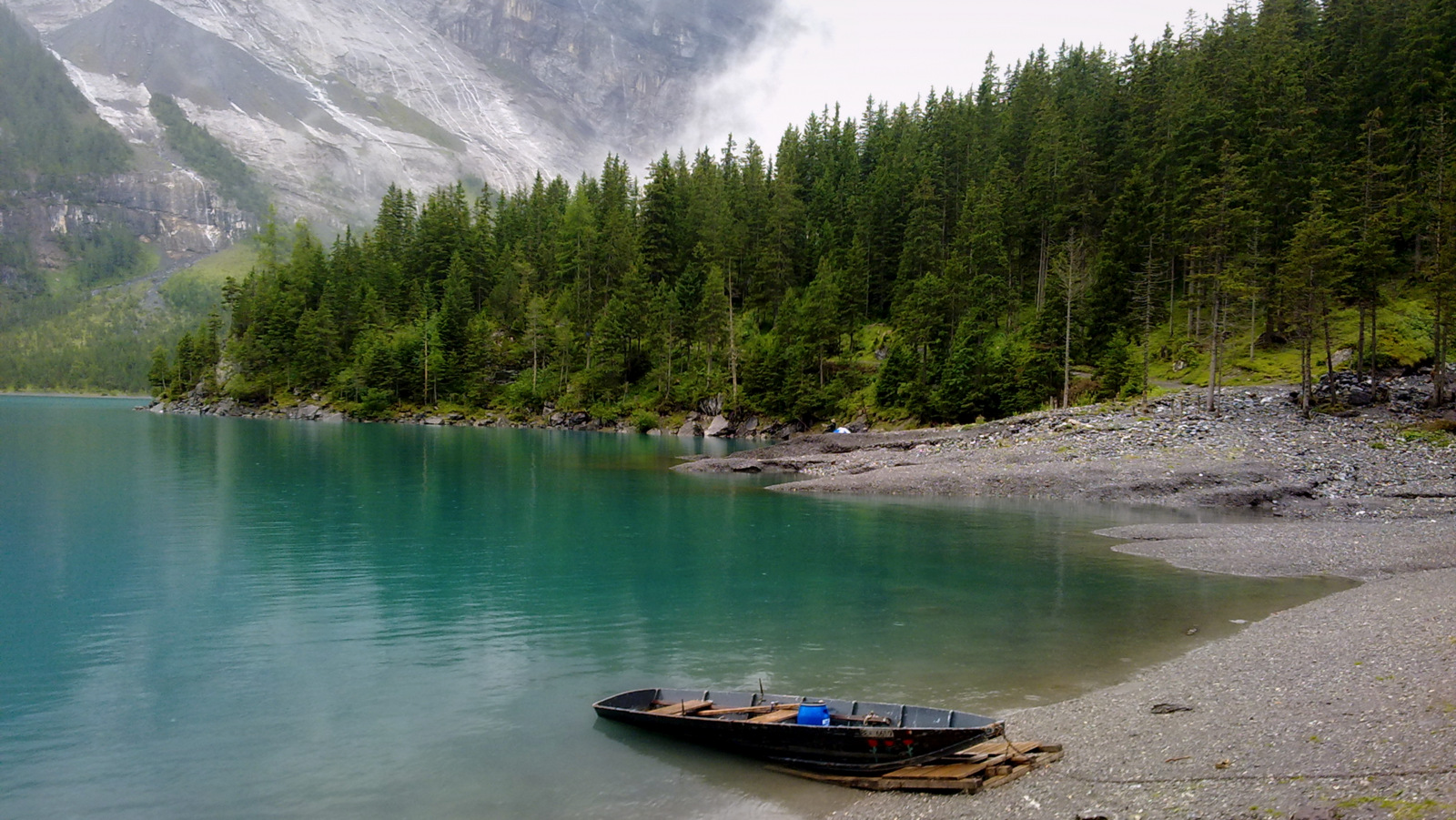

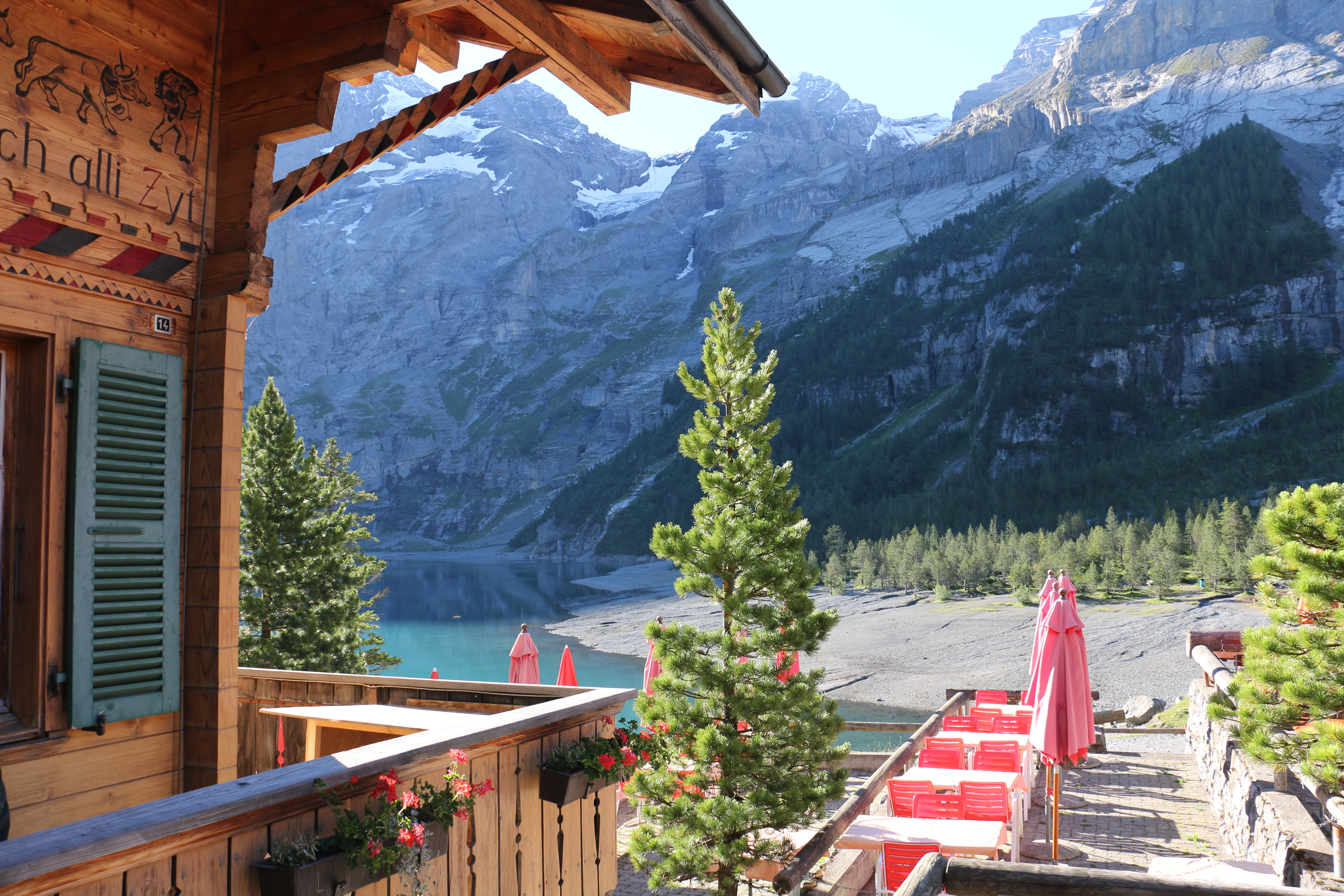

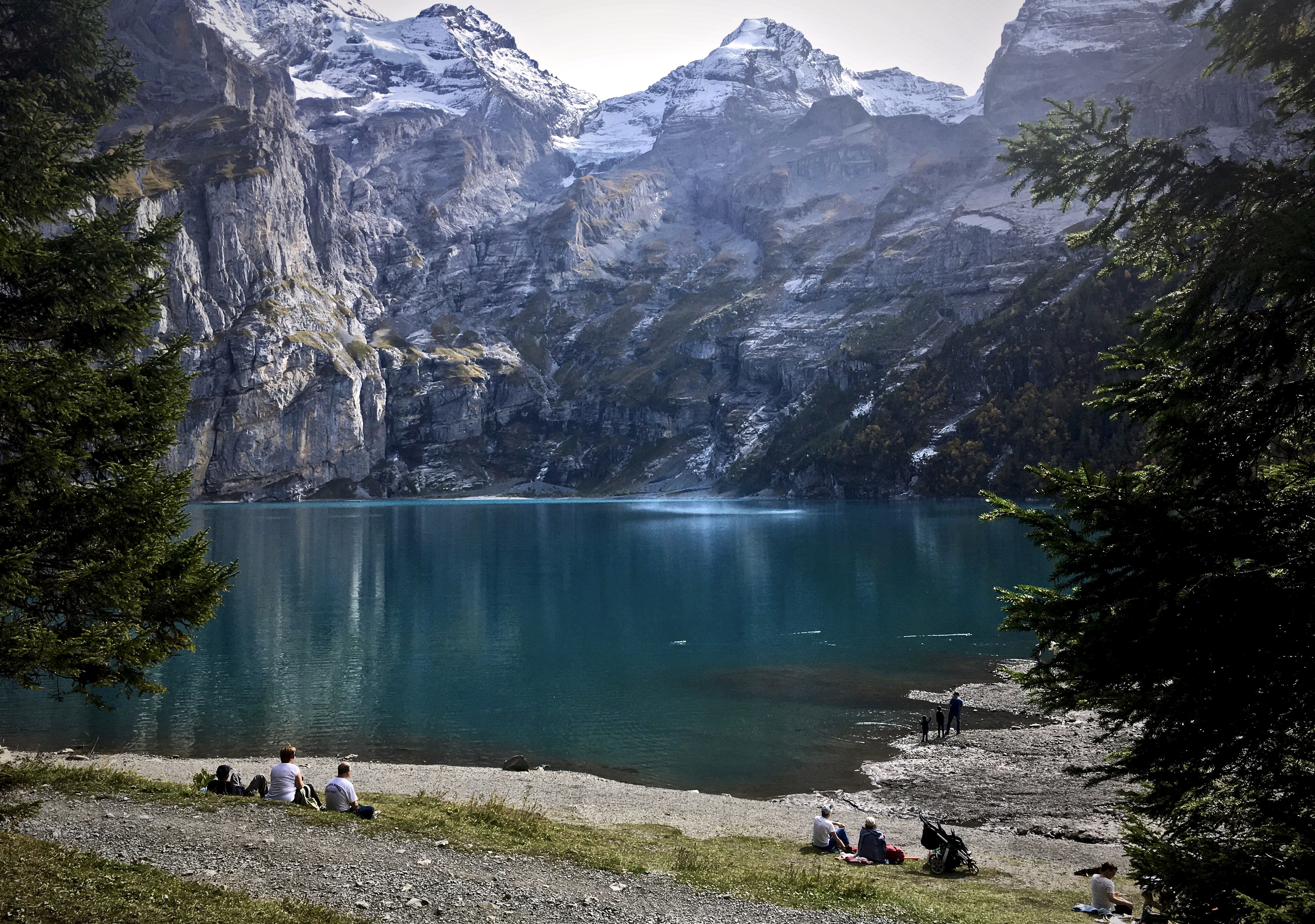

== See also ==
- List of lakes of Switzerland
- List of mountain lakes of Switzerland
