= Doldenhorn =

Mountain in Switzerland

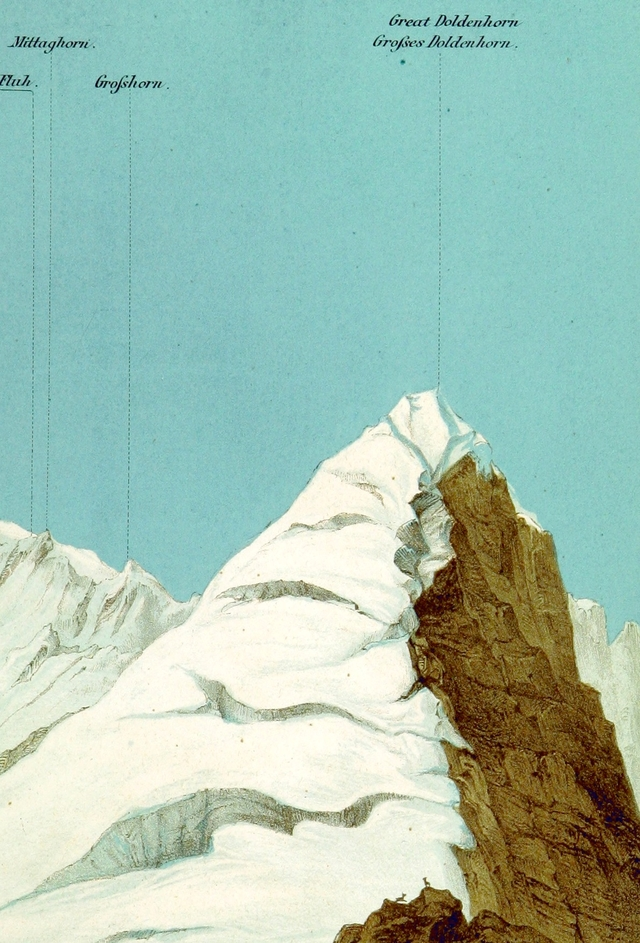
- A drawing by Abraham Roth who was one of the first to climb it

Highest point
- Elevation: 3,638 m (11,936 ft)
- Prominence: 655 m (2,149 ft)
- Parent peak: Blüemlisalp
- Isolation: 3.6 km (2.2 mi)
- Listing: Alpine mountains above 3000 m
- Coordinates: 46°28′07″N 7°44′06″E

Geography
- Location within Switzerland
- Location: Bern, Switzerland
- Parent range: Bernese Alps

Climbing
- First ascent: 30 June 1862 by Johann Bischoff, Kaspar Blatter, Christian Lauener, Gilgian Reichen, Abraham Roth and Edmund von Fellenberg.

The Doldenhorn is a mountain of the Bernese Alps, overlooking Kandersteg in the Bernese Oberland. On its north side is Lake Oeschinen.

== See also ==
- List of mountains of Switzerland
