= Engstlige Tunnel =

Railway tunnel in Switzerland

The Engstlige Tunnel is a 2.585 km (1.606 mi) long tunnel in the Swiss canton of Bern on the northern approach to the Lötschberg Base Tunnel along the Lötschberg axis of the New Railway Link through the Alps.

The tunnel bypasses Frutigen. Its north portal is located approximately 1.3 km after the LBT line branches off from the Lötschberg railway line, between the mountain line and the Kander river. The tunnel shortens the route of the mountain line, passes under the Engstlige river shortly before Frutigen station, and then under the station itself. The south portal is located near the Tellenfeld intervention point, immediately south of Frutigen station.

The open-pit tunnel was constructed using the cut-and-cover method. It is designed for two tracks, but for the time being only used by one. This track is located in the eastern tube, which is separated from the trackless western tube by a central wall.
