= Hahnenmoos Pass =

Mountain pass of the Bernese Alps

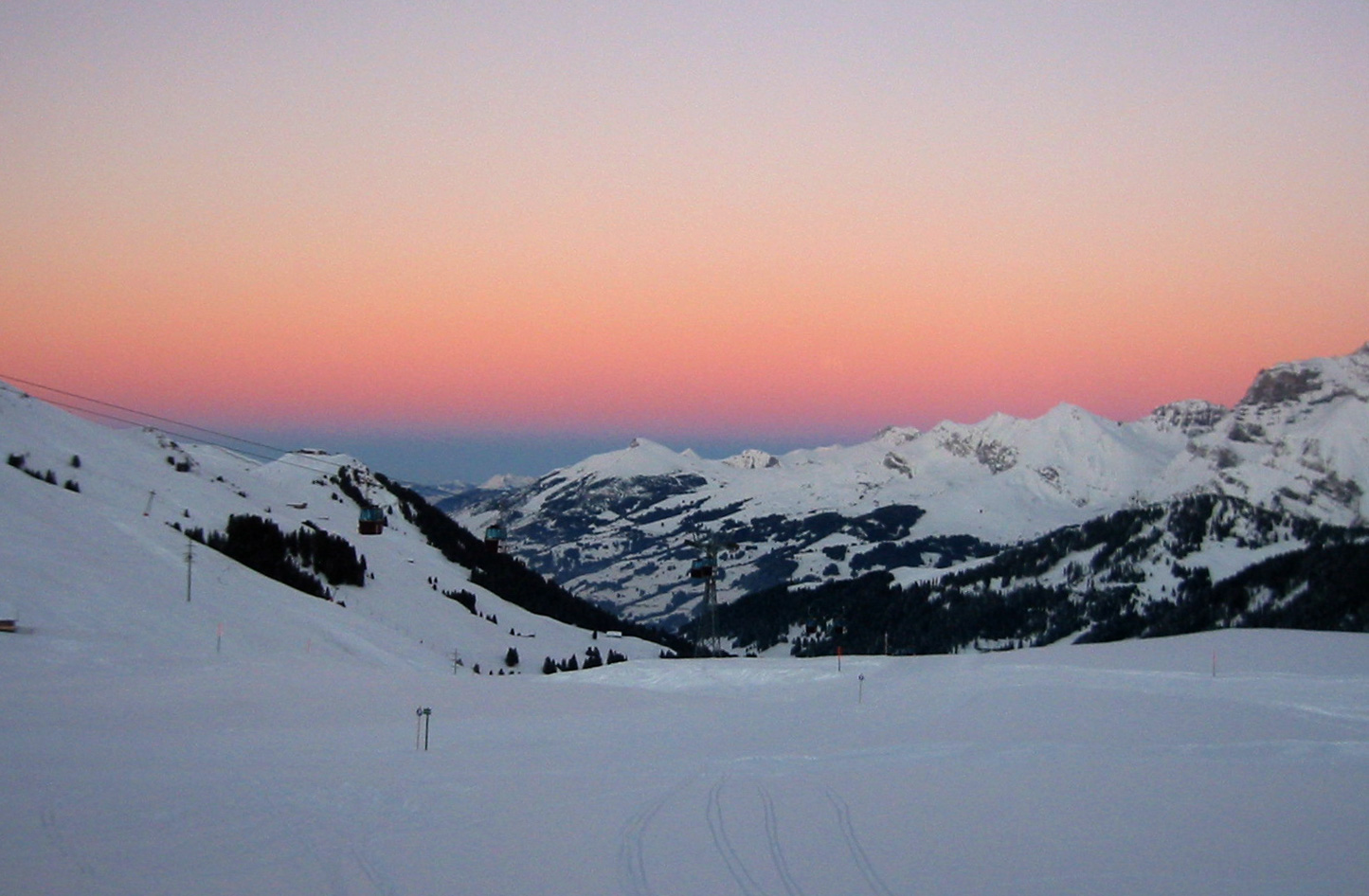
- The Hahnenmoos Pass in winter

- Location within Switzerland
- Elevation: 1,950 metres (6,400 ft)
- Traversed by: Trail (dead end road)

Third Approach
- Location: Bern, Switzerland
- Range: Bernese Alps
- Coordinates: 46°27′11″N 7°29′42″E

The Hahnenmoos Pass (German: Hahnenmoospass) is a mountain pass of the Bernese Alps. The pass crosses the col between the peaks of Regenboldshorn and Albristhorn, at an elevation of 1,950 m (6,400 ft). The Hahnenmoos Pass is the lowest pass between the Engstligental, to the east, and the upper Simmental, to the west.

The pass is traversed by a hiking track, which connects Adelboden, at an elevation of 1,350 m (4,430 ft) in the Engstligental, with Lenk, at an elevation of 1,068 m (3,504 ft) in the Simmental. The track forms part of the Alpine Pass Route, a long-distance hiking trail across Switzerland between Sargans and Montreux. Although a road leads to the pass from Adelboden, the pass can not be traversed by car.

In winter the pass is part of a ski area. The Berghotel Hahnenmoospass is a hotel and restaurant that is located at the summit of the pass and is open in both summer and winter.

== See also ==
- List of highest paved roads in Switzerland
- List of mountain passes in Switzerland
