= Chlyne Lohner =

Mountain in Switzerland

- Klein Lohner
- Location within Switzerland

Highest point
- Elevation: 2,587 m (8,488 ft)
- Prominence: 202 m (663 ft)
- Coordinates: 46°29′12″N 7°37′33″E

Geography
- Location: Bern, Switzerland
- Parent range: Bernese Alps

The Chlyne Lohner (also spelled Klein Lohner) is a mountain of the Bernese Alps, located between the valleys of Adelboden and Kandersteg.

The Chlyne Lohner lies to the north of the Gross Lohner, from which it is separated by the Bunderchrinde Pass, which provides a hiking route between Adelboden and Kandersteg.
