= Bunderchrinde Pass =

Mountain pass of the Bernese Alps

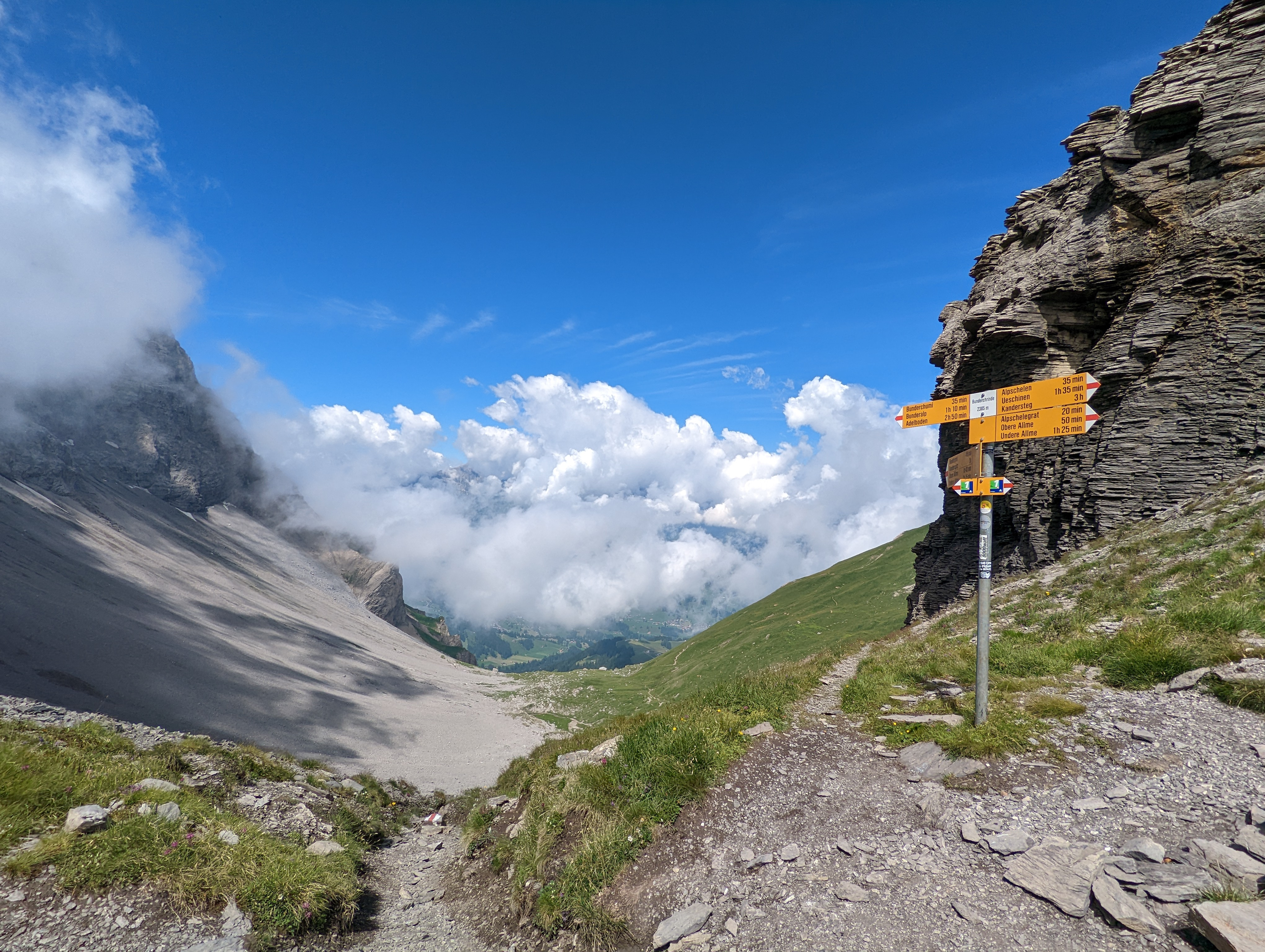

- Location within Switzerland
- Elevation: 2,385 metres (7,825 ft)
- Traversed by: Track or trail

Third Approach
- Location: Canton of Bern
- Range: Bernese Alps
- Coordinates: 46°28′57″N 07°37′34″E

The Bunderchrinde Pass is a mountain pass of the Bernese Alps. The pass crosses the col between the peaks of Gross Lohner and Chlyne Lohner, at an elevation of 2,385 m (7,825 ft).

The pass is traversed by a hiking track, which connects Kandersteg, at an elevation of 1,174 m (3,852 ft) in the valley of the Kander river, with Adelboden, at an elevation of 1,350 m (4,430 ft) in the valley of the Engstlige river. The track forms part of the Alpine Pass Route, a long-distance hiking trail across Switzerland between Sargans and Montreux.

== See also ==
- List of mountain passes in Switzerland
