= Regenboldshorn =

Mountain in Switzerland

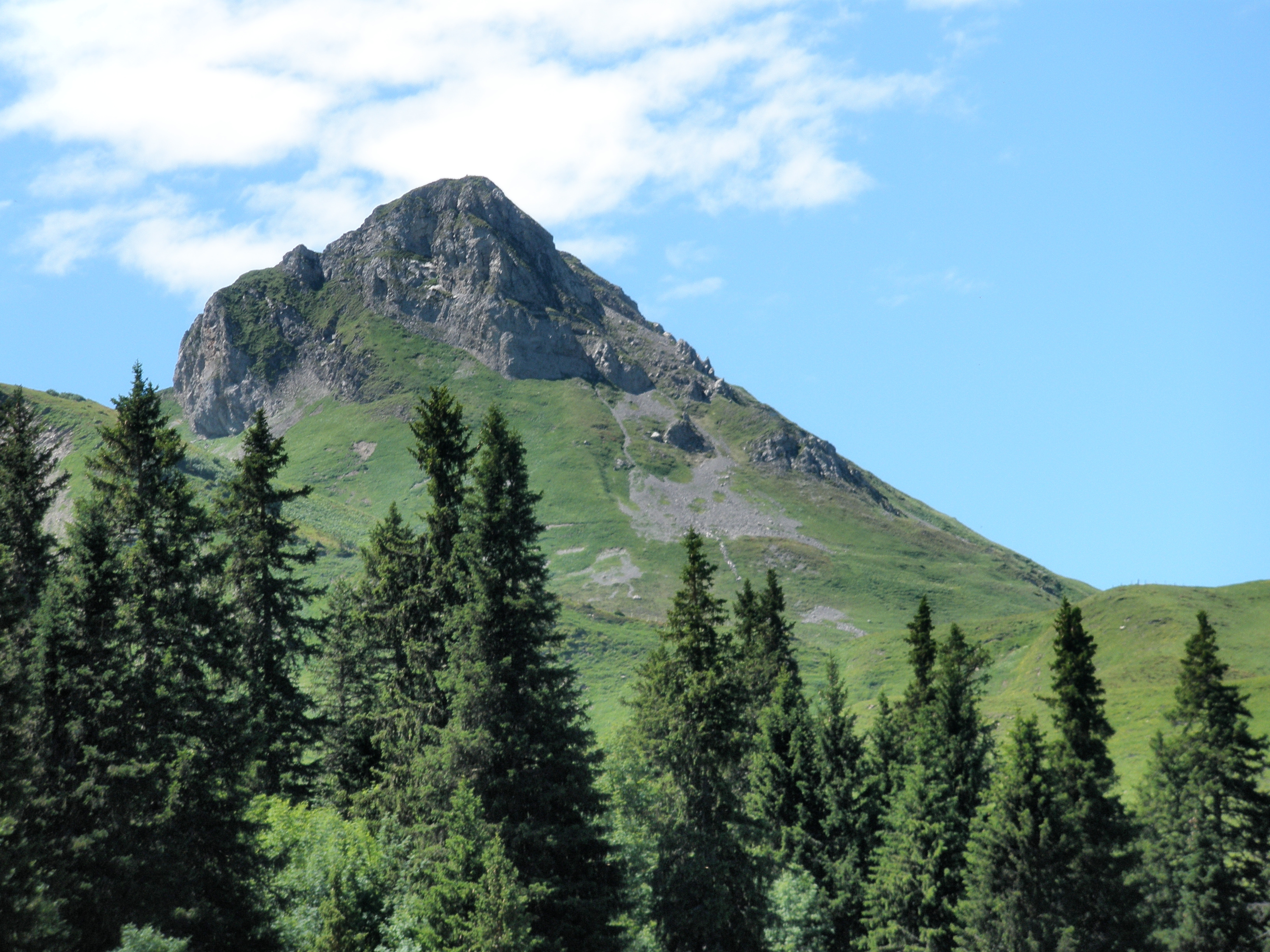
- View from the east

Highest point
- Elevation: 2,193 m (7,195 ft)
- Prominence: 100 m (330 ft)
- Coordinates: 46°26′32″N 7°30′16″E

Geography
- Location within Switzerland
- Location: Bern, Switzerland
- Parent range: Bernese Alps

The Regenboldshorn (or Rägeboldshore; 2,193 m) is a mountain of the Bernese Alps, located between Lenk and Adelboden in the canton of Bern. It lies south of the Hahnenmoos Pass, at the foot of the Ammertenspitz (part of the Wildstrubel massif).

The summit of the Regenboldshorn can be reached via marked trails from all sides of the mountain, except for the northeast side, which forms a steep limestone cliff. A chair lift connects Geisbüel (south of Adelboden) to a lower summit on the east named Bummeregrat.

== See also ==
- List of mountains of Switzerland accessible by public transport
