= Foostock =

Mountain in Switzerland

- Ruchen
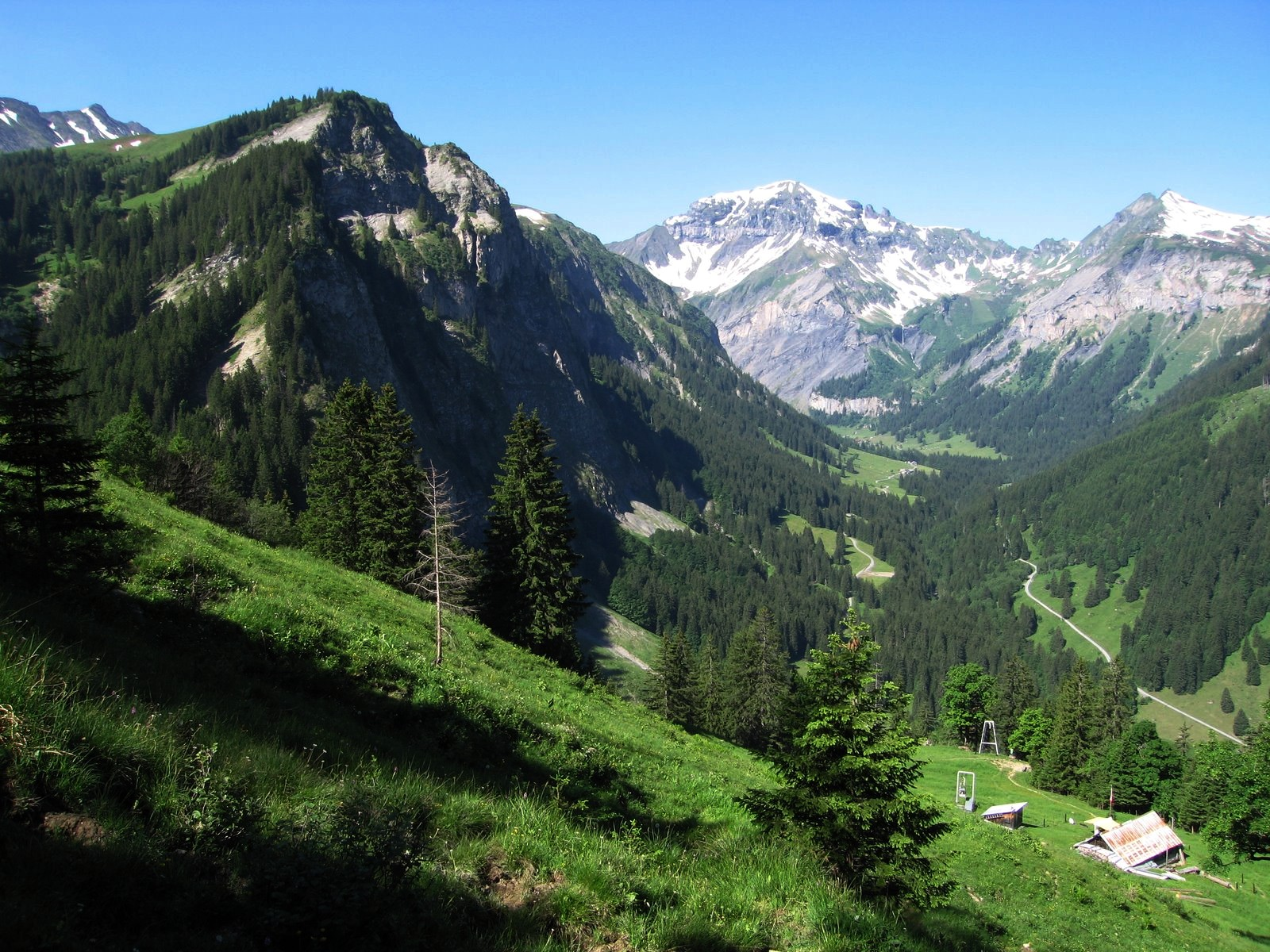
- The Foostock (centre-right) from the Weisstannental (east side)

Highest point
- Elevation: 2,611 m (8,566 ft)
- Prominence: 388 m (1,273 ft)
- Parent peak: Tödi
- Coordinates: 46°57′23.3″N 9°14′40.8″E

Geography
- Location within Switzerland Location within Canton of Glarus Location within Canton of St. Gallen
- Location: Glarus/St. Gallen
- Country: Switzerland
- Parent range: Glarus Alps
- Topo map: Swiss Federal Office of Topography swisstopo

The Foostock, also known as the Ruchen, is a mountain of the Glarus Alps, located on the border between the Swiss cantons of Glarus and St. Gallen. It lies north of Piz Sardona, on the range that separates the Sernf Valley from the Weisstannen Valley.

The Foostock lies between two passes that carry hiking trails between the cantons of St. Gallen and Glarus. The Foo Pass lies to the south of the Foostock and carries a trail from Weisstannen in St. Gallen to Elm in Glarus, forming part of the Alpine Pass Route between Sargans to Montreux. The less well known Riseten Pass lies to the north of the Foostock and links Weisstannen with Matt in Glarus.

== See also ==
- List of mountains of the canton of Glarus
- List of mountains of the canton of St. Gallen
