= Gsür =

Mountain in the Bernese Alps

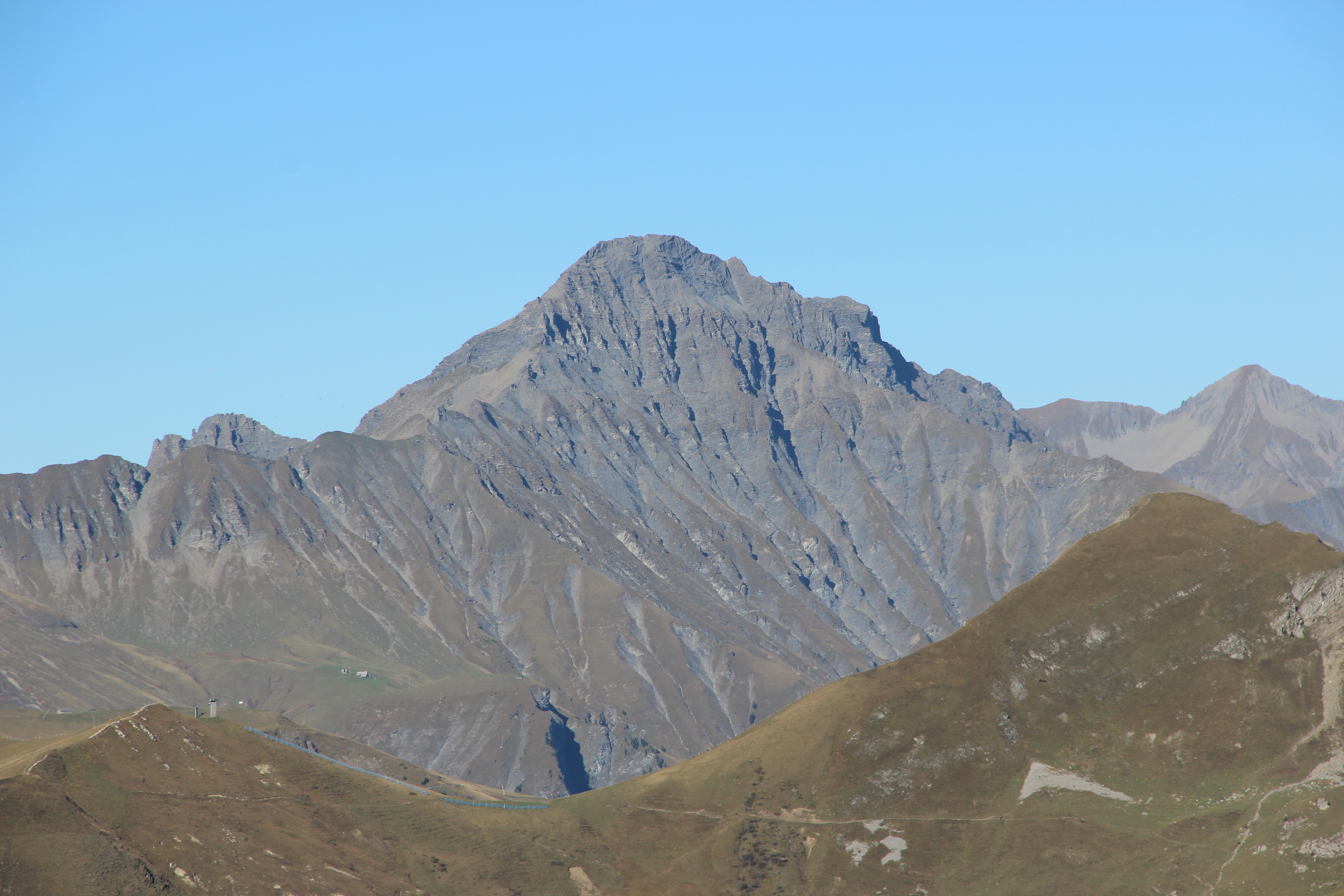

Highest point
- Elevation: 2,708 m (8,885 ft)
- Prominence: 372 m (1,220 ft)
- Parent peak: Albristhorn
- Listing: Alpine mountains 2500-2999 m
- Coordinates: 46°30′38.8″N 07°31′11.4″E

Geography
- Location within Switzerland
- Location: Bern, Switzerland
- Parent range: Bernese Alps

The Gsür is a mountain in the Bernese Alps at the very southeastern end of the Diemtigtal and rising above Adelboden in the Entschligetal in the canton of canton of Bern.

== Impressions ==
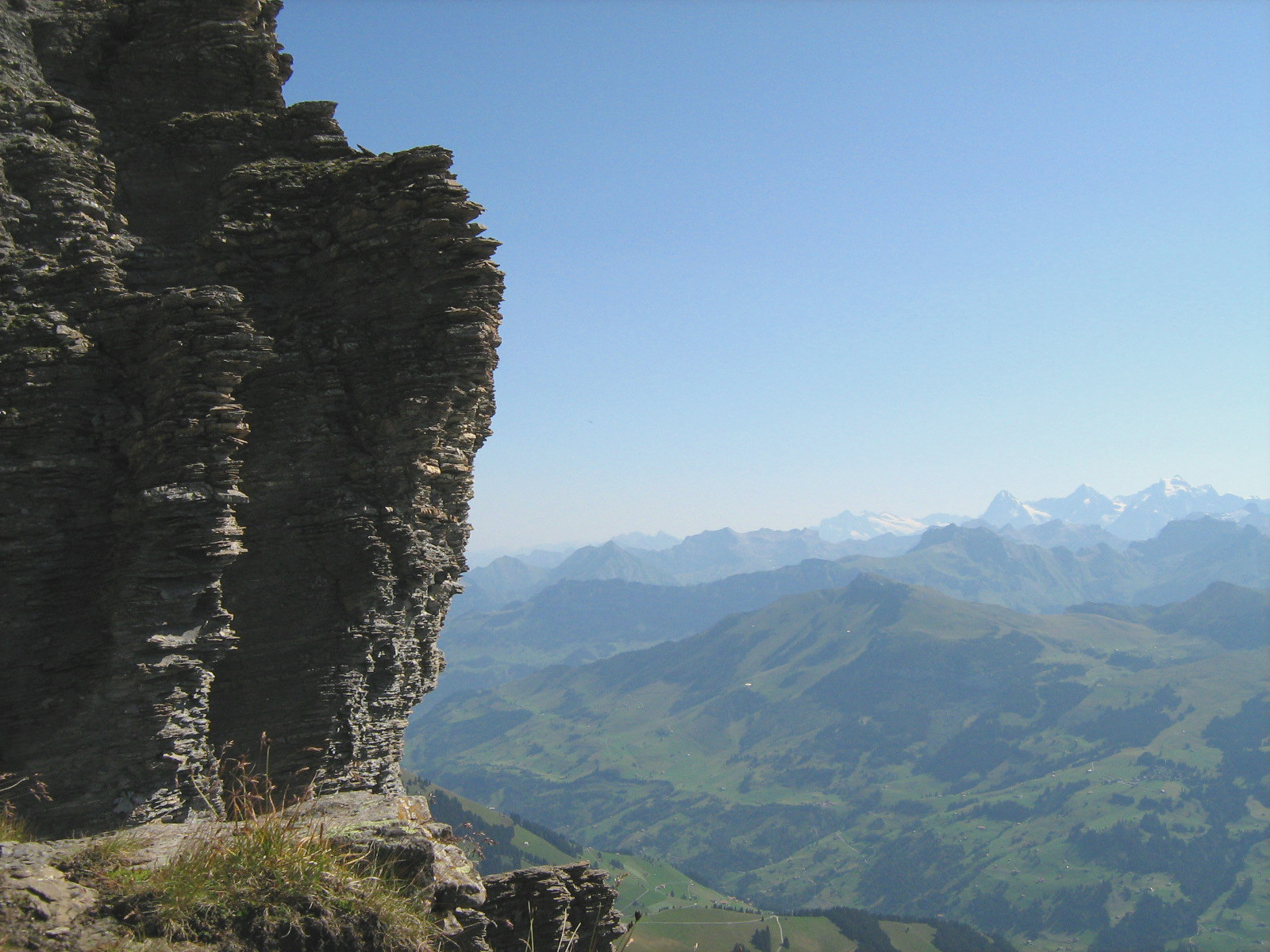
View during the ascent
