= Gross Lohner =

Mountain of the Bernese Alps

- Vorder Lohner
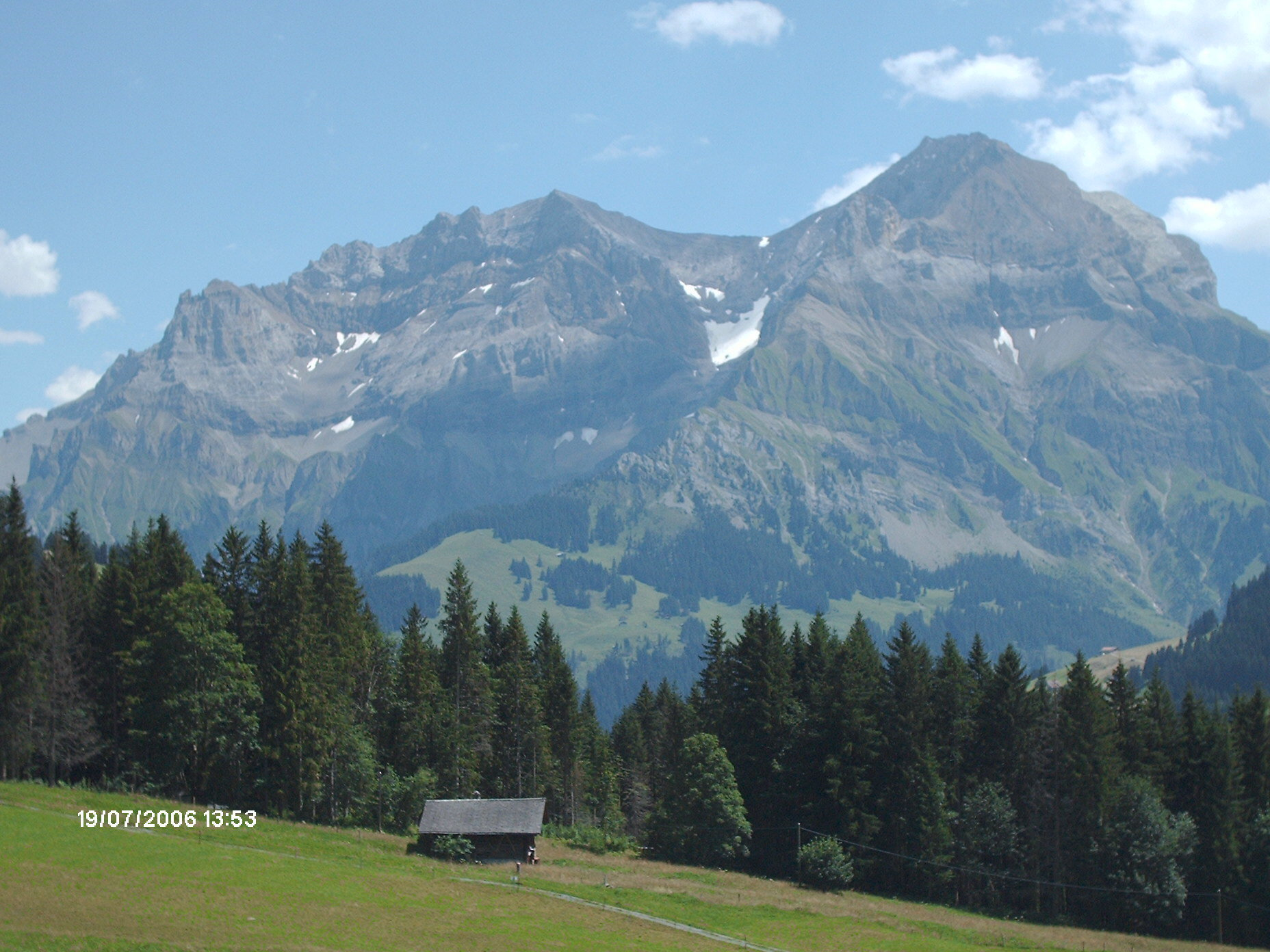
- Gross Lohner as seen from the west

Highest point
- Elevation: 3,048 m (10,000 ft)
- Prominence: 563 m (1,847 ft)
- Parent peak: Wildstrubel
- Listing: Alpine mountains above 3000 m
- Coordinates: 46°27′45″N 7°36′0″E

Geography
- Location within Switzerland
- Location: Bern, Switzerland
- Parent range: Bernese Alps

Climbing
- First ascent: 1875, by Kandersteg guides Ogi and Hari

The Gross Lohner (also spelled Gross Loner, German: Great Lohner), is a limestone mountain of the Bernese Alps, located between Adelboden and Kandersteg in the Bernese Oberland. The main summit has an elevation of 3,048 metres (10,000 ft) above sea level and is distinguished by the name Vorder Lohner ("Fore Lohner"). The mountain features several other peaks, from east to west:

- Nünihorn, 2,717 metres (8,914 ft)
- Hinder Lohner (Rear Lohner), 2,928 metres (9,606 ft)
- Mittler Lohner (Central Lohner), 3,001 metres (9,846 ft)
- Mittaghorn, 2,678 metres (8,786 ft)

The Lohner range is located east of Adelboden in the Engstlige valley and southwest of Kandersteg in Kander valley. The Gross Lohner is separated from the Chlyne Lohner (Small Lohner) to the north by the Bunderchrinde Pass, which provides a hiking route between Adelboden and Kandersteg.

The first tourist to climb the Lohner was one C. Dürheim from Bern in July 1876. In August of the same year, four members of the Alpine Club, during another ascent, found a bottle with the names of the two Kandersteg mountain guides Ogi and Hari, dated 1875.

Approximately halfways up the rock face, the Lohner hut can be found, which can be reached by skilled hikers without proper climbing.

The mountain with its many screes is almost only accessible by one of its three ridges. From the Lohner hut, the Mittler Lohner can be reached via the face by skilled climbers.
