= Engstligen Falls =

Waterfalls near Adelboden in the Bernese Highlands

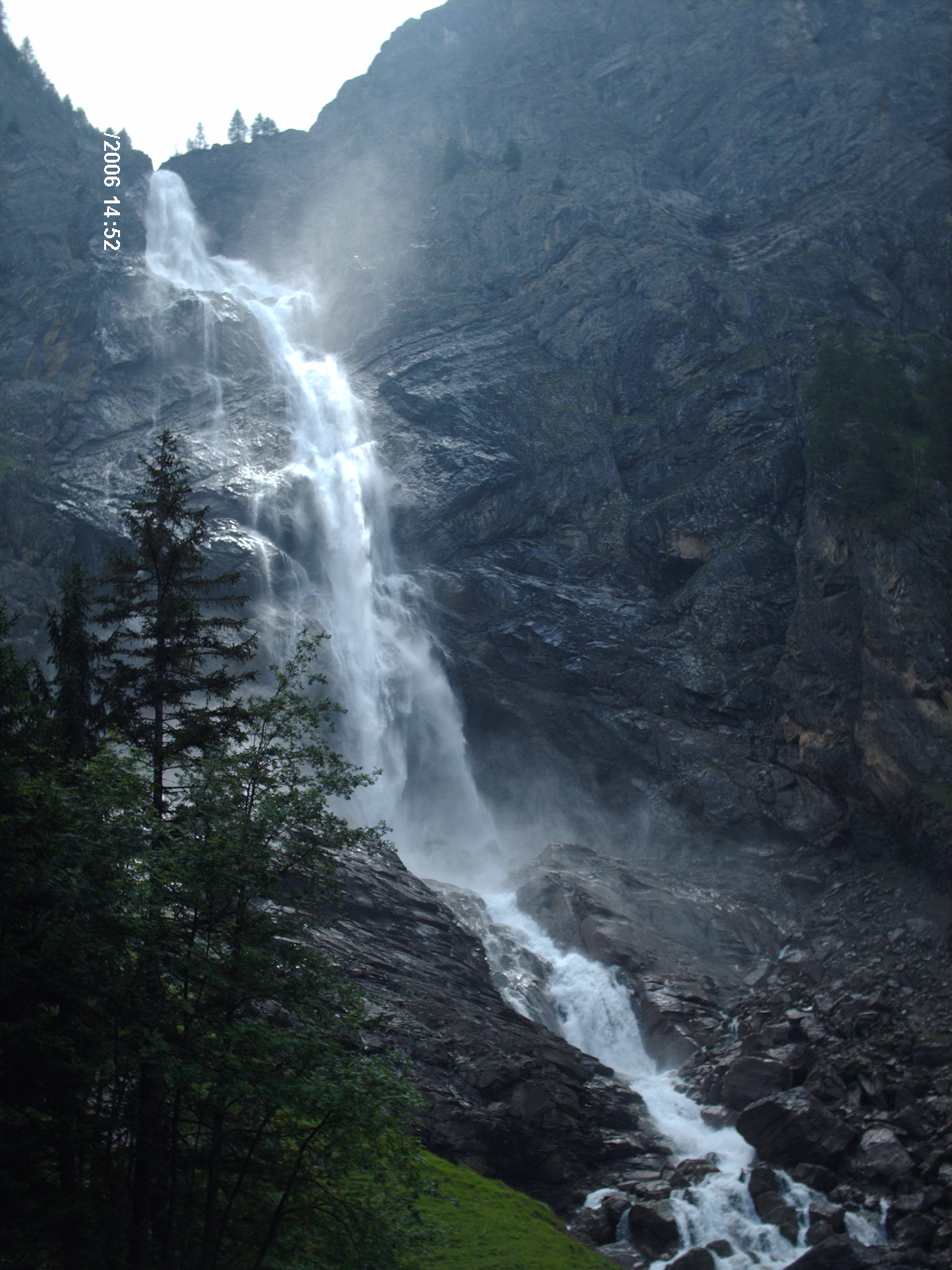
- The lower cascade of the Engstligen Falls
- Interactive map of Engstligen Falls
- Location: Adelboden, Switzerland
- Coordinates: 46°26′56″N 7°33′43″E
- Elevation: 2,000 metres (6,562 ft)
- Total height: 370 metres (1,214 ft)
- Number of drops: 2

The Engstligen Falls near Adelboden in the Bernese Highlands consists of two waterfalls, Engstligen Fall I & II (German: Engstligenfall I & II) of heights of 97 metres (318 ft), and 165 metres (541 ft), respectively). They are listed in the Swiss Inventory of Landscapes of National Significance and have been under environmental law since 1948.

The Engstligen Falls have one of the highest water volumes of alpine waterfalls, and are one of Adelboden's attractions.

The numerous mountain streams of the Engstligenalp, a plateau at an elevation of 2,000 metres (6,600 ft), join together near its northern exit and cascade in two steps over the rocks, falling 375 metres into the Engstligen valley where they form the source of the river Entschlige.

The upper falls can be partly seen from the Engstligenalp cable railway; a full view is possible from the mule track leading up the rocks. While the lower falls are accessible on an easy mountain path from the lower station of the Engstligenalp cable railway.

In winter, the Engstligen Falls are a popular location for ice climbers.

== See also ==
- List of waterfalls
- List of waterfalls in Switzerland
