= Steghorn =

Mountain of the Bernese Alps

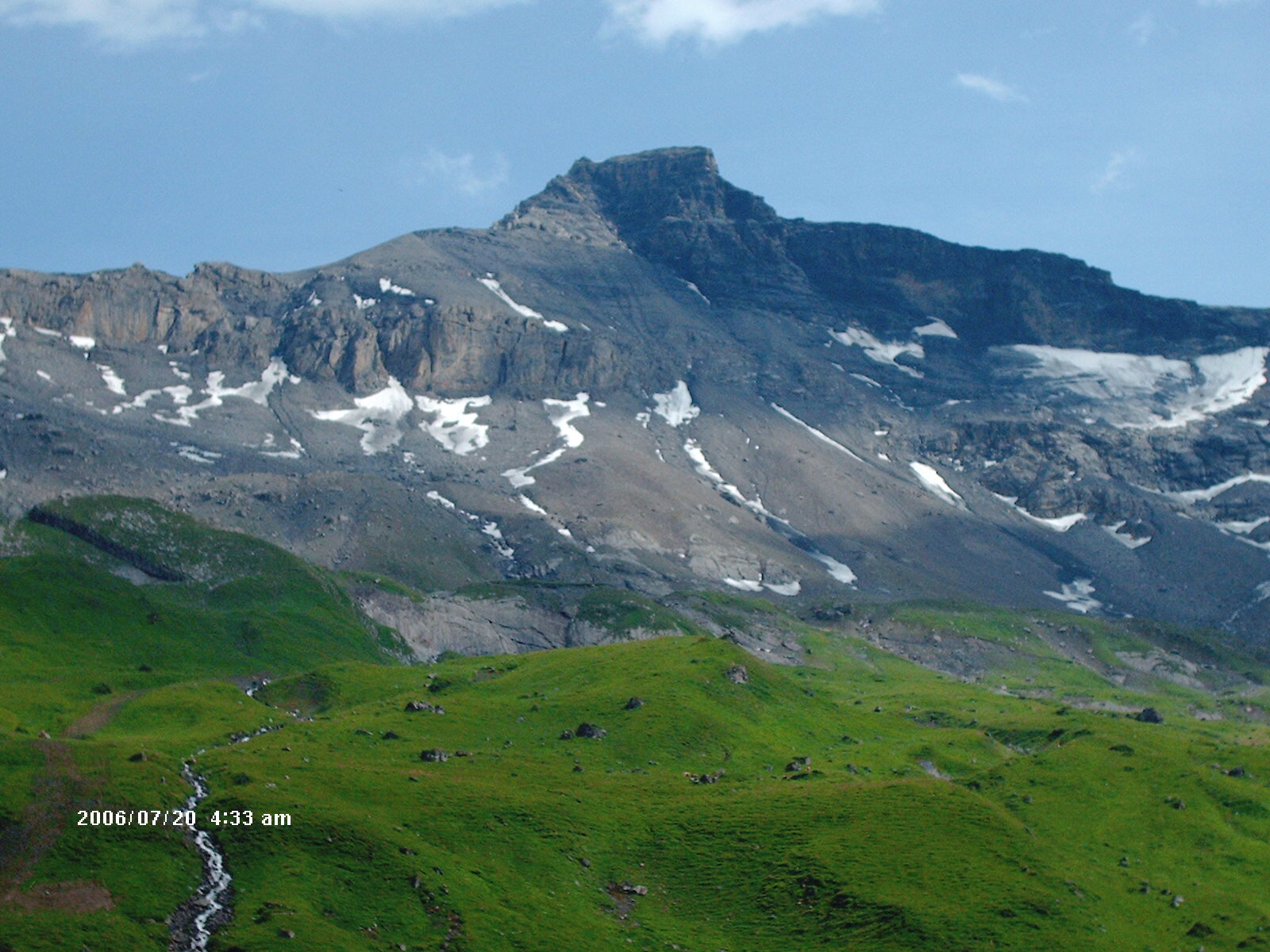
- The north side

Highest point
- Elevation: 3,147 m (10,325 ft)
- Prominence: 279 m (915 ft)
- Parent peak: Wildstrubel
- Coordinates: 46°25′0″N 7°35′3″E

Geography
- Location within Switzerland
- Location: Bern/Valais, Switzerland
- Parent range: Bernese Alps

Climbing
- Easiest route: From "Lämmeren" hut, Valais

The Steghorn is a mountain of the Bernese Alps, located on the border between the Swiss cantons of Bern and Valais. It lies between the Engstligenalp (Bernese Oberland and the Gemmi Pass (Valais). The Steghorn belongs to the massif of the Wildstrubel.

The easiest ascent can be made from the "Lämmeren" hut in the canton of Valais via the Steghorn glacier or the Leiterli rocks. Another route leads from Engstligenalp along the ridge between Steghorn and Wildstrubel.

The mountain can also be ascended from both sides during wintertime, yet the skiing tour is very challenging.
