= Adelboden =

- Municipality
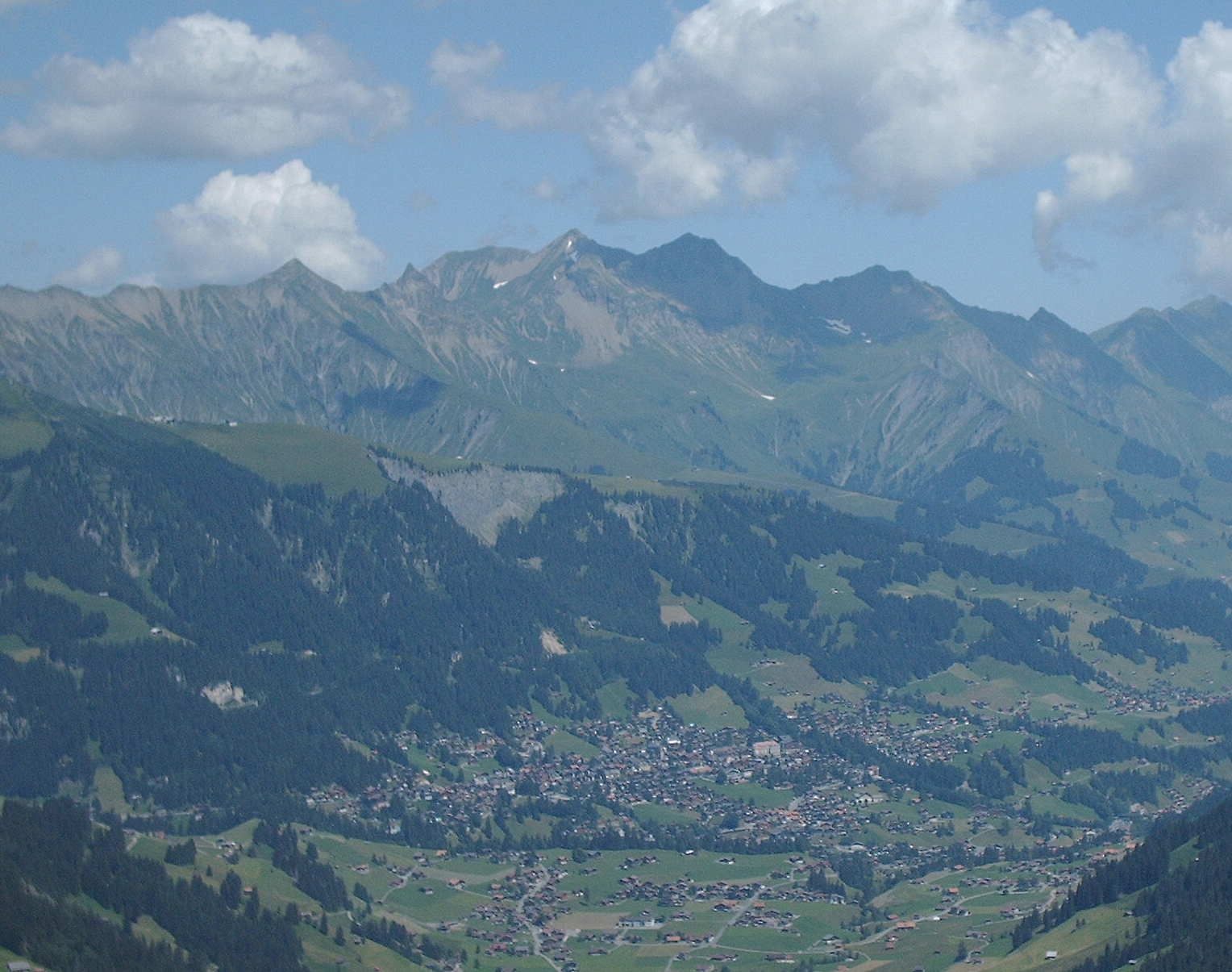
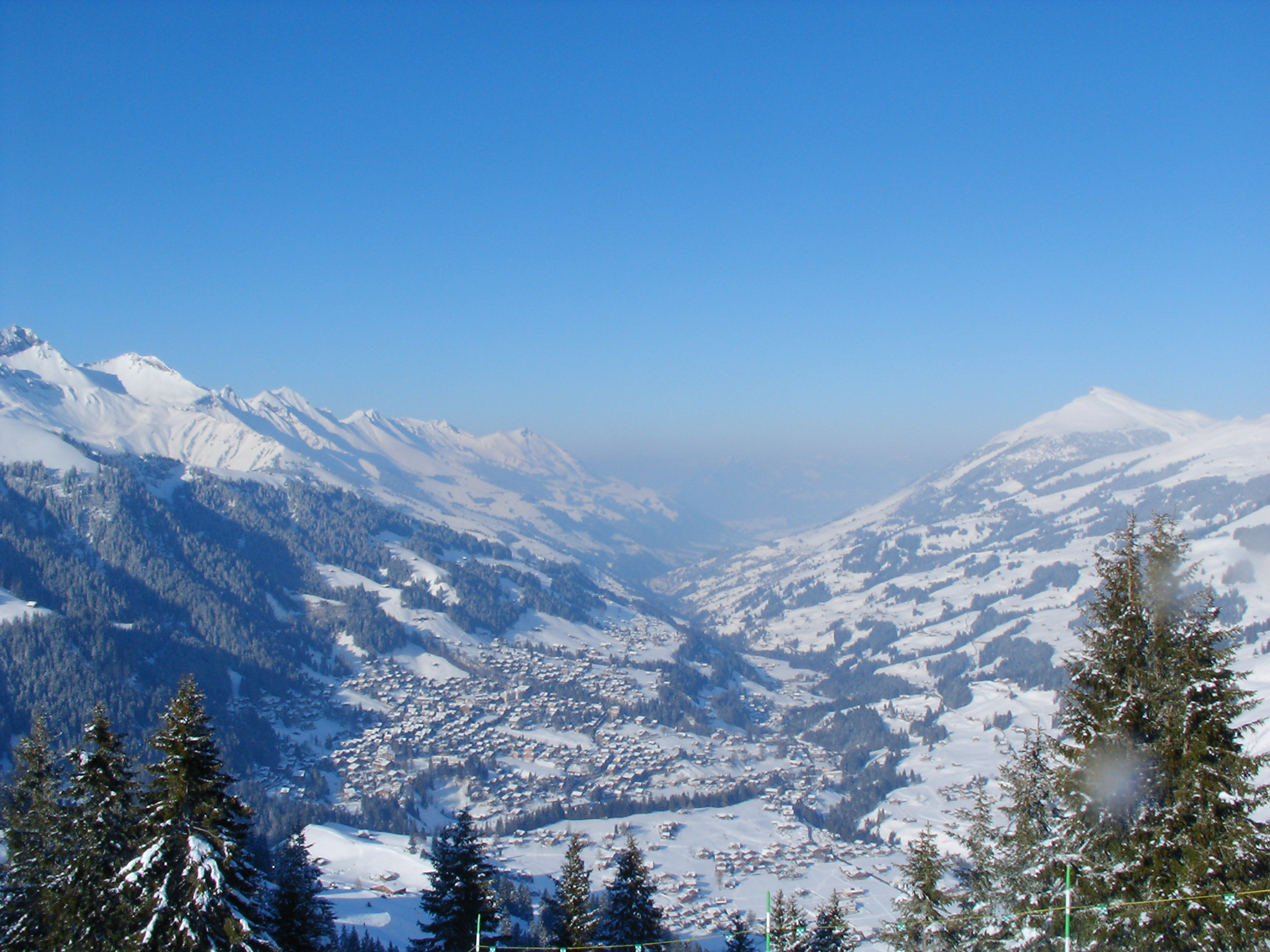
- Adelboden in July 2006 Adelboden in winter

- Flag Coat of arms
- Location of Adelboden
- Location within Switzerland Location within Canton of Bern
- Coordinates: 46°30′N 7°34′E
- Country: Switzerland
- Canton: Bern
- District: Frutigen-Niedersimmental

Government
  - Executive: Gemeinderat with 7 members
  - Mayor: Gemeindepräsident(in)/Obmann; Willy Schranz-Hari (as of 2026)

Area
  - Total: 88.2 km^{2} (34.1 sq mi)
- Elevation: 1,350 m (4,430 ft)
- Highest elevation (Grossstrubel): 3,242 m (10,636 ft)
- Lowest elevation (Engstligen valley): 1,045 m (3,428 ft)

Population (December 2020)
  - Total: 3,343
  - Density: 37.9/km^{2} (98.2/sq mi)
- Demonym: German: Adelbodner(in)
- Time zone: UTC+01:00 (CET)
  - Summer (DST): UTC+02:00 (CEST)
- Postal code: 3715
- SFOS number: 561
- ISO 3166 code: CH-BE
- Surrounded by: Diemtigen, Frutigen, Kandersteg, Lenk im Simmental, Leukerbad (VS), Sankt Stephan
- Website: https://www.3715.ch

Adelboden (Alemannic German: Adelbode) is a mountain village and a municipality in Switzerland, located in the Frutigen-Niedersimmental administrative district in the Bernese Highlands.

== Geography ==
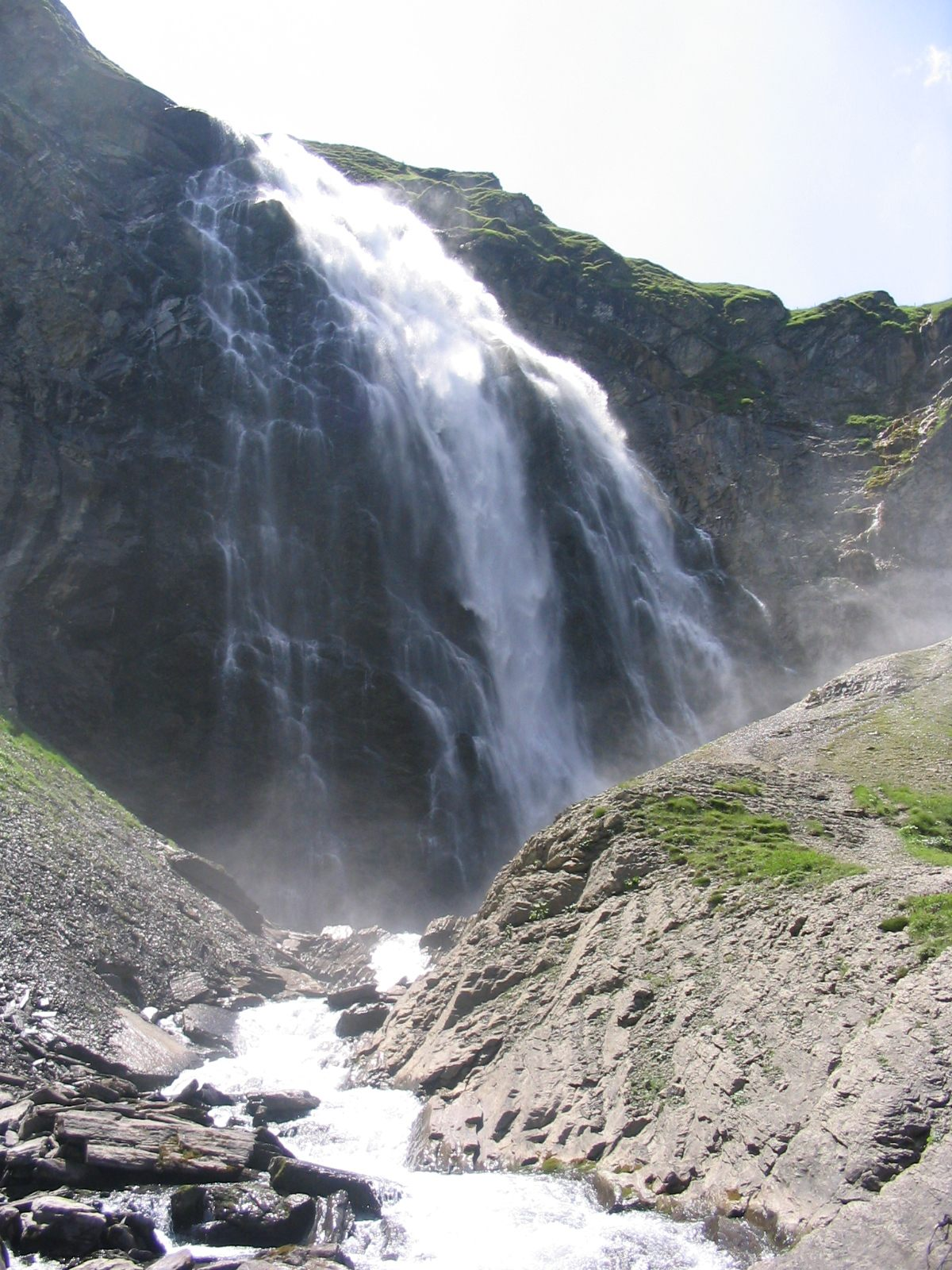
Engstligen Falls

Aerial view (1934)

Adelboden lies in the west of the Bernese Highlands, at the end of the valley of the river Entschlige (High German: Engstlige), which flows in Frutigen into the Kander.

Adelboden is a traditional Swiss mountain village on a terrace looking south to the Engstligen waterfalls. Also part of the village are the inhabited valleys of Gilbach, Stigelschwand, Boden, Hirzboden, and Ausserschwand. The church and main street are at 1,350 m (4,430 ft), the highest point of the area is the Grossstrubel with 3,242 m (10,636 ft), and the lowest point is at 1,045 m (3,428 ft) in the Engstligen valley.

The vegetation is alpine and sub-alpine, partially wooded, the slopes, the plateaus, and terraces usually alp meadows.

The most salient mountains are Lohner (3,049 m (10,003 ft)), Steghorn (3,146 m (10,322 ft)), Wildstrubel (3,243 m (10,640 ft)), Fitzer (2,458 m (8,064 ft)), Tschenten (2,025 m (6,644 ft)) (mountain railway), Albristhorn (2,762 m (9,062 ft)) and Gsür (2,708 m (8,885 ft)).

Adelboden has an area of 87.61 km^{2} (33.83 sq mi). Of this area, 36.52 km^{2} (14.10 mi^{2}) or 41.4% is used for agricultural purposes, while 16.07 km^{2} (6.20 mi^{2}) or 18.2% is forested. Of the rest of the land, 2.18 km^{2} (0.84 mi^{2}) or 2.5% is settled (buildings or roads), 1.53 km^{2} (0.59 mi^{2}) or 1.7% is either rivers or lakes and 31.93 km^{2} (12.33 mi^{2}) or 36.2% is unproductive land.

Of the built up area, housing and buildings made up 1.5% and transportation infrastructure made up 0.8%. Out of the forested land, 14.4% of the total land area is heavily forested and 3.0% is covered with orchards or small clusters of trees. Of the agricultural land, 8.5% is pastures and 32.9% is used for alpine pastures. All the water in the municipality is flowing water. Of the unproductive areas, 9.6% is unproductive vegetation, 25.6% is too rocky for vegetation and 1.1% of the land is covered by glaciers.

On 31 December 2009 Amtsbezirk Frutigen, the municipality's former district, was dissolved. On the following day, 1 January 2010, it joined the newly created Verwaltungskreis Frutigen-Niedersimmental.

== Coat of arms ==
The blazon of the municipal coat of arms is Argent on a Mount Vert an Eagle displayed Sable beaked, langued and membered Gules.

== History ==
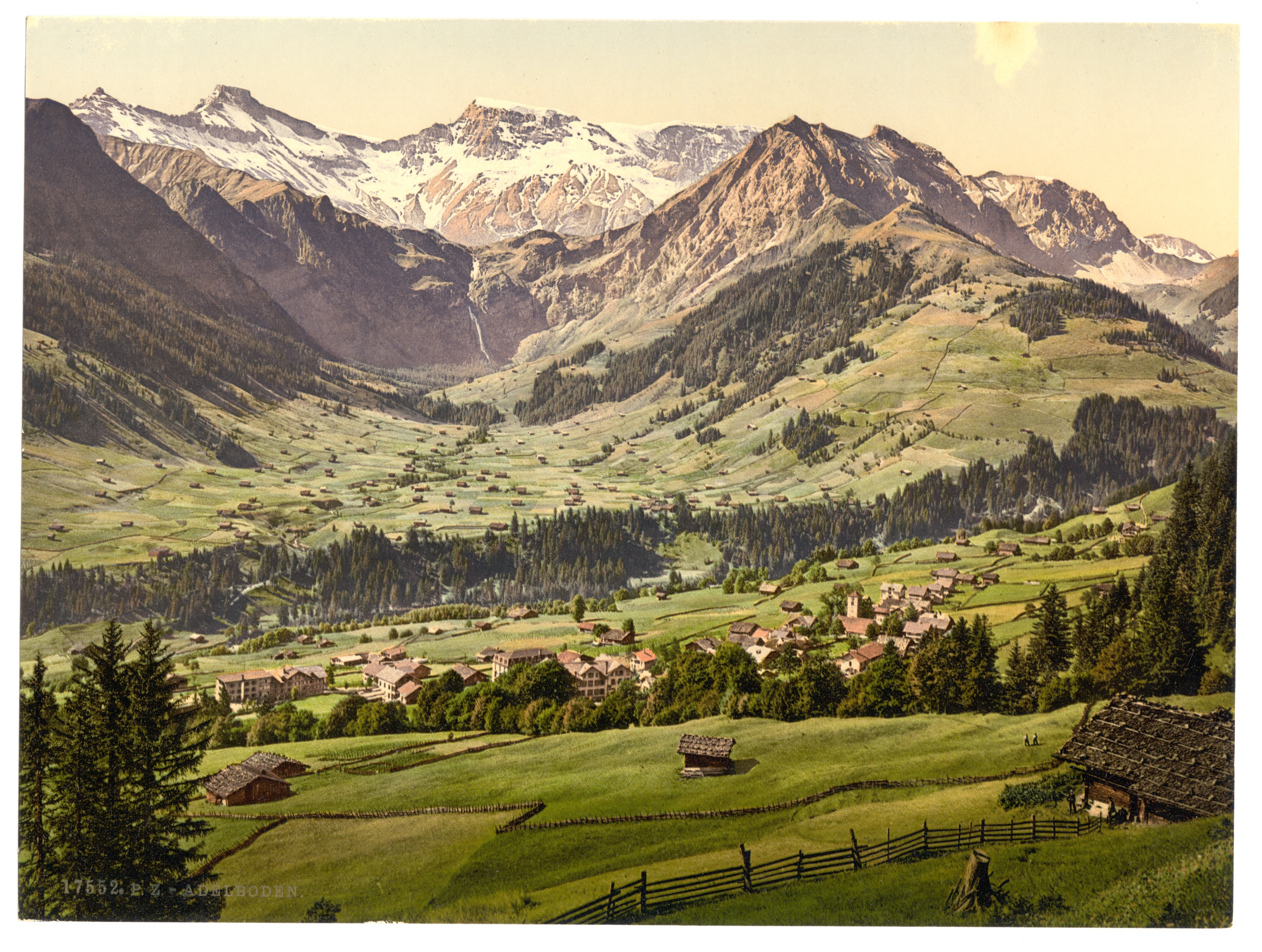
Adelboden in 1900

Adelboden is first mentioned 617 years ago in 1409 as in valle Adelboden. In 1453, it was mentioned as Adelboden alias silva.

The alps Engstligenalp and Silleren belonging to Adelboden first appeared in historical records in the 13th century. The inhabitants of Engstligental are referred to as forest people. In the 15th century, Adelboden established its own church and there were over 50 house fathers vouching for the salary of the minister.

In the 16th century, when Adelboden joined the Reformation, the Catholic priest fled over the Hahnenmoospass to the Catholic Canton of Fribourg.

Prior to the 19th century, the primary method of reaching Frutigen was by travelling along the steep southern south slope of the Engstligen Valley, a journey that was often rendered impassable in winter months. However, in the late 19th century, a road was constructed along the river Entschlige, improving accessibility and connecting the town of Adelboden to the rest of the world.

In the 1870s the first boarding house was opened by one of the local teachers. Over time, it evolved into a hotel, which remains under the ownership of the same family (known as Hotel Hari im Schlegeli). This was accompanied by a significant increase in the town's population, thanks to the influx of tourists around the turn of the century.

Adelboden was the destination of the first packaged winter sports holidays (vacations), organised by Sir Henry Lunn in 1903.

Into the 1930s the aerial ropeway to the Engstligenalp was built with further ropeways following. The Silleren area was up into the 1980s accessible by buses.

=== World War Two ===
During World War Two, Adelboden was an internment camp with converted chalets and hotels used to house internees. Adelboden was chosen because it was isolated, surrounded by mountains and so relatively hard to escape from. The US Government paid the local hotels for the internees' room and board.

Internees included British, German, Polish, Russian, Czech, and French combatants. American internees named the area “Camp Maloney” after the first American internee to die.

== Main sights and cultural events ==
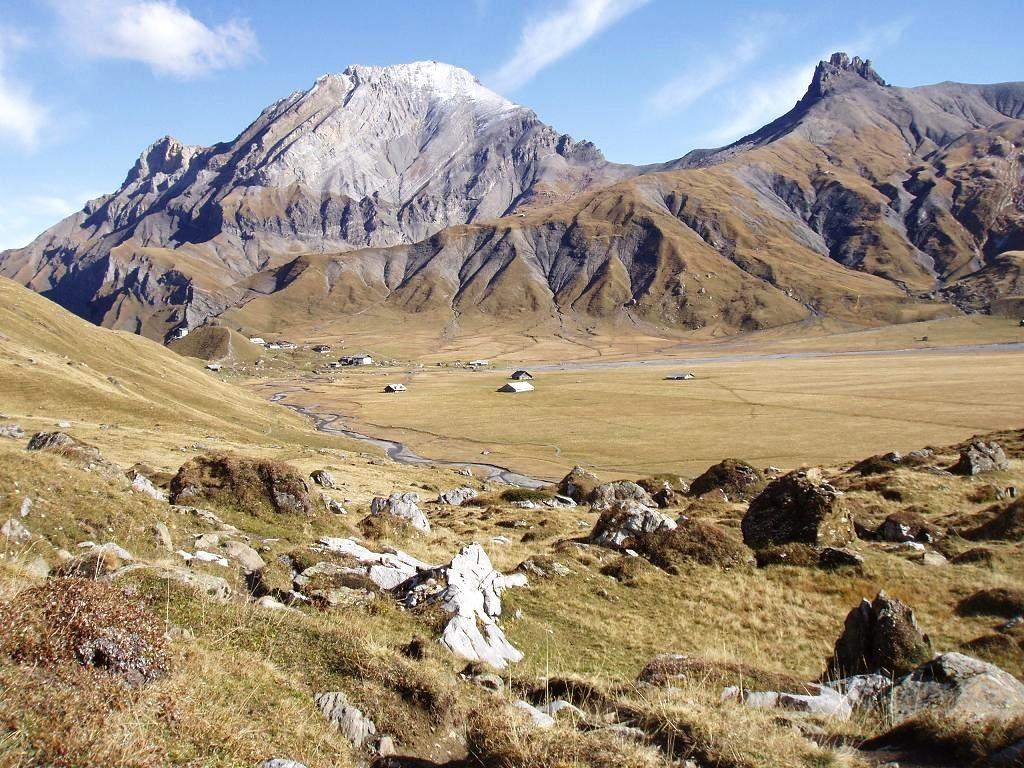
Engstligenalp plateau in autumn.

- Engstligen Falls: the river Entschlige falls 375 m (1,230 ft) over rocks into the depth and forms one of the most impressive waterfalls in the Bernese Highlands. Very impressive is the "Alpaufzug" when 350 cows are driven upward on the narrow seam path through the cliff to the summer pasture on the Engstligenalp in early summer.
- Engstligenalp: plateau at 2,000 m (6,560 ft) elevation
- The town's church, with early-20th-century glassworks by Augusto Giacometti.
- Our Chalet – A Guiding world centre and an international meeting place for Girl Guides and Girl Scouts.

Cultural events include:

- World Cup Men's alpine ski races (January)
  - the men's giant slalom course is one of the most challenging on the World Cup circuit.
- Vogellisi-Festival (Live music, July)
- Vogellisi Lauf (Mountain running race in July)
- Kammermusic-festival (Chamber music, July)
- Langlauf night – every 30 December – Cross Country races on the main street of town

== Demographics ==
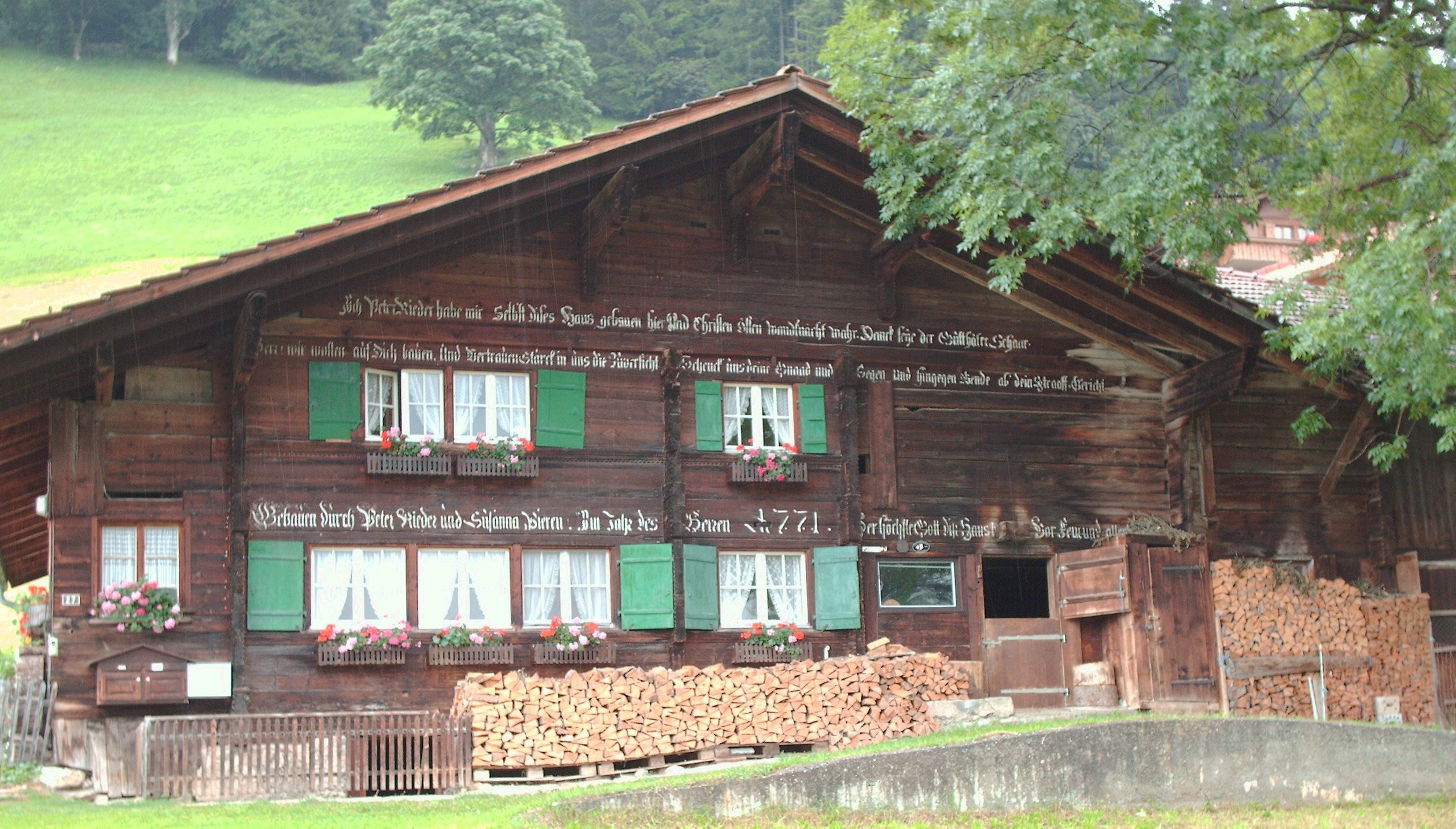
Traditional farm house, built in 1771.

Adelboden has a population of 3,343 (as of December 2020). According to a 2010 census, 6.9% of the population consists of foreign nationals residing in the area. The population has experienced a slight decrease of -0.2% between the years 2000–2010. This change can be attributed to a decrease in migration of −1.2%, while births and deaths accounted for 2.2%.

According to data from the year 2000, the majority of the population (3,453 individuals, making up 95.0% of the population) speak German as their first language. Serbo-Croatian ranks as the second most prevalent language spoken, with 36 speakers (1.0%), followed by Portuguese with 34 speakers (0.9%). In addition, 29 people reported speaking French, while Italian and Romansh were cited by 17 and 6 individuals, respectively.

As of 2008, the population was 49.1% male and 50.9% female. The population was made up of 1,618 Swiss men (45.4% of the population) and 133 (3.7%) non-Swiss men. There were 1,699 Swiss women (47.7%) and 113 (3.2%) non-Swiss women. Of the population in the municipality, 2,124 or about 58.4% were born in Adelboden and lived there in 2000. There were 666 or 18.3% who were born in the same canton, while 365 or 10.0% were born somewhere else in Switzerland, and 290 or 8.0% were born outside of Switzerland.

As of 2010, children and teenagers (0–19 years old) make up 23.6% of the population, while adults (20–64 years old) make up 56.6% and seniors (over 64 years old) make up 19.8%.

As of 2000, there were 1,600 people who were single and never married in the municipality. There were 1,771 married individuals, 204 widows or widowers and 59 individuals who are divorced.

As of 2000, there were 478 households that consist of only one person and 152 households with five or more people. In 2000, a total of 1,347 apartments (41.8% of the total) were permanently occupied, while 1,722 apartments (53.4%) were seasonally occupied and 154 apartments (4.8%) were empty. As of 2010, the construction rate of new housing units was 5.3 new units per 1000 residents. The vacancy rate for the municipality, in 2011, was 0.06%.

The historical population is given in the following chart:

== Languages ==
The language is Adelbodnertütsch, which belongs to the Berner Oberland dialects with some influences from Valais dialects. It is also classified as part of the Highest Alemannic language group.

Most of the population (as of 2000) speaks German (95.0%), with Serbo-Croat the second most common ( 1.0%), and Portuguese third ( 0.9%).

== Government ==
Legislation is adopted by the biannual general assembly. Executive is the local council with nine members, all of whom are honorary.

In the 2011 federal election the most popular party was the Swiss People's Party (SVP) which received 41.7% of the vote. The next three most popular parties were the Federal Democratic Union of Switzerland (EDU) (20%), the Conservative Democratic Party (BDP) (10.4%) and the Evangelical People's Party (EVP) (9%). In the federal election, a total of 1,673 votes were cast, and the voter turnout was 61.4%.

== Economics ==
Adelboden has a mixture of agriculture, local industry (wood building companies, mineral water source) and tourism. People work in tourism, (approximately 490 persons), other services (approx. 500 persons), construction industry (approx. 310 persons), automobile industry (approx. 30 persons), mineral water source (approx. 45 persons) and agriculture (full-time approx. 45 persons), taxidermy (full-time approx. 16 persons).

As of 2011, Adelboden had an unemployment rate of 1.29%. As of 2008, there were a total of 2,084 people employed in the municipality. Of these, there were 366 people employed in the primary economic sector and about 133 businesses involved in this sector. 617 people were employed in the secondary sector and there were 57 businesses in this sector. 1,101 people were employed in the tertiary sector, with 150 businesses in this sector. There were 1,833 residents of the municipality who were employed in some capacity, of which females made up 40.5% of the workforce.

In 2008 there were a total of 1,675 full-time equivalent jobs. The number of jobs in the primary sector was 192, all of which were in agriculture. The number of jobs in the secondary sector was 580 of which 88 or (15.2%) were in manufacturing and 450 (77.6%) were in construction. The number of jobs in the tertiary sector was 903. In the tertiary sector; 214 or 23.7% were in wholesale or retail sales or the repair of motor vehicles, 123 or 13.6% were in the movement and storage of goods, 370 or 41.0% were in a hotel or restaurant, 12 or 1.3% were in the information industry, 12 or 1.3% were the insurance or financial industry, 24 or 2.7% were technical professionals or scientists, 40 or 4.4% were in education and 42 or 4.7% were in health care.

In 2000, there were 224 workers who commuted into the municipality and 211 workers who commuted away. The municipality is a net importer of workers, with about 1.1 workers entering the municipality for every one leaving. Of the working population, 9.7% used public transportation to get to work, and 38.1% used a private car.

Adelboden has an unemployment rate of 1.8%. As of 2005, there were 366 people employed in the primary economic sector and about 143 businesses involved in this sector. 601 people are employed in the secondary sector and there are 57 businesses in this sector. 1098 people are employed in the tertiary sector, with 153 businesses in this sector.

== Religion ==
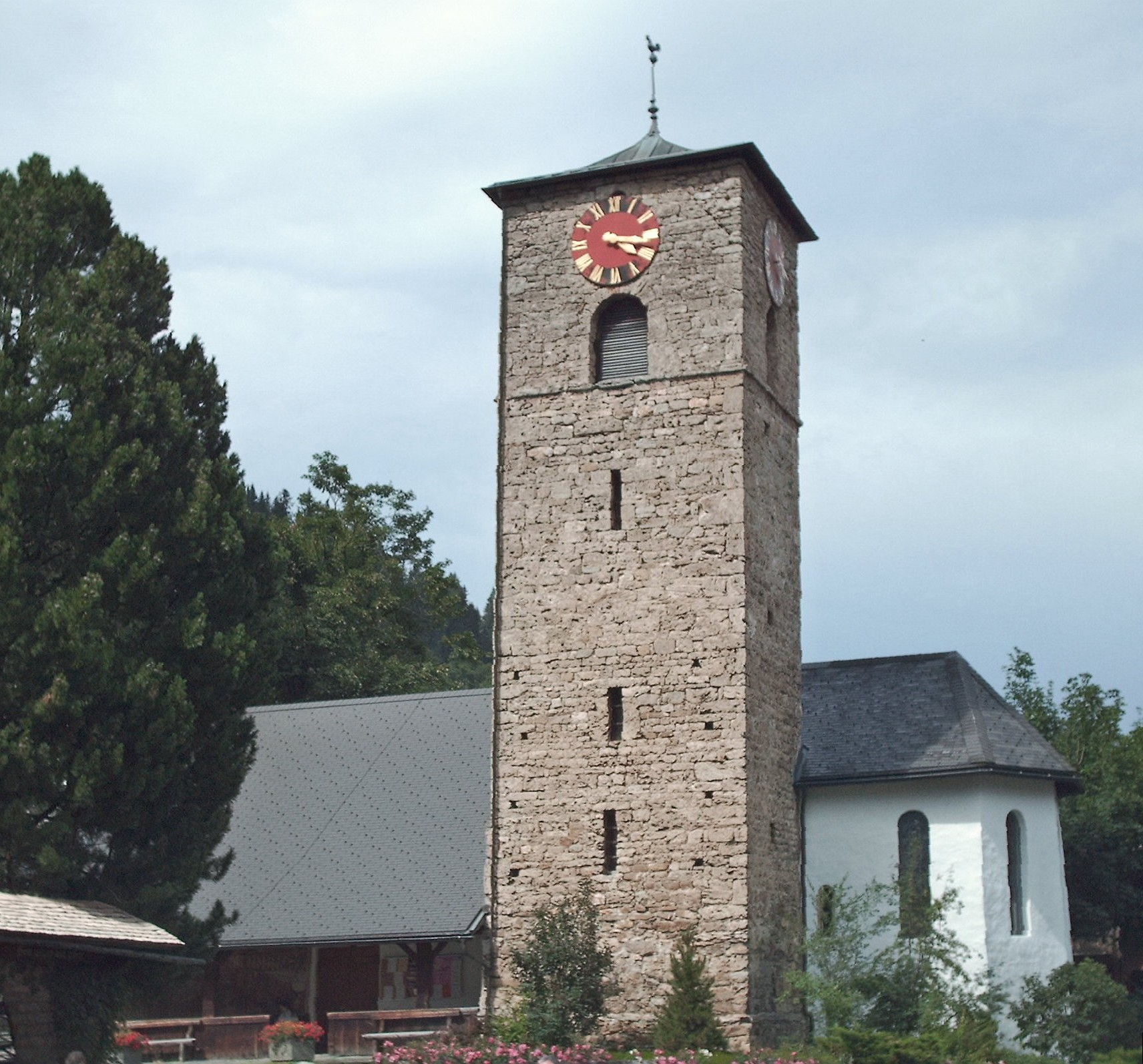
Adelboden village church

From the 2000 census, 221 or 6.1% were Roman Catholic, while 2,406 or 66.2% belonged to the Swiss Reformed Church. Of the rest of the population, there were 37 members of an Orthodox church (or about 1.02% of the population), there was 1 individual who belongs to the Christian Catholic Church, and there were 1,173 individuals (or about 32.28% of the population) who belonged to another Christian church. There was 1 individual who was Jewish, and 69 (or about 1.90% of the population) who were Islamic. There was 1 person who was Buddhist and 4 individuals who belonged to another church. 72 (or about 1.98% of the population) belonged to no church, are agnostic or atheist, and 234 individuals (or about 6.44% of the population) did not answer the question.

== Tourism and sport ==
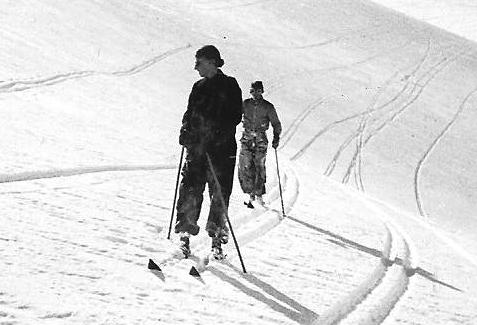
British visitors Lawrence and Doris Ogilvie on wooden skis in Adelboden 1938

Tourism in Adelboden is family-oriented and accommodations include 24 hotels (1,291 beds), 3,800 vacation homes (15,200 beds), 28 group accommodations (1,830 beds), three camp sites, and 40 restaurants.

There are 200 km (125 mi) of summer hiking trails, from sedate walks to alpine climbing routes. Numerous mountain railways lead up to the mountains. Additional activities are: numerous mountain bike routes; and model aircraft construction on Hahnenmoospass with a workshop, and wind and landing opportunities.

In the winter, Adelboden has ski runs of all degrees of difficulty, including the World Cup giant slalom run on the Chuenisbärgli, and cross-country ski trails. There are 40 km (25 mi) of winter hiking trails. For snowboarders there are freeride and freestyle runs.

Adelboden's giant slalom and slalom races are considered classic events on the World Cup circuit and were scheduled for 7–8 January in 2017.

In recent years, the story of a mythical medicine woman named Vogellisi has increasingly been adopted as the symbol or mascot for a variety of touristic activities and souvenirs.

== Climate ==
According to the Köppen Climate Classification system, Adelboden has a Marine West Coast Climate, abbreviated "Cfb" on climate maps with mild, rainy summers with cool nights and long, moderately cold and very snowy winters. Sunshine peaks during summertime though Adelboden is very cloudy year round, especially during winter.

Climate data for Adelboden, elevation 1,321 m (4,334 ft), (1991–2020)
| Month | Jan | Feb | Mar | Apr | May | Jun | Jul | Aug | Sep | Oct | Nov | Dec | Year |
|---|---|---|---|---|---|---|---|---|---|---|---|---|---|
| Mean daily maximum °C (°F) | 2.8 (37.0) | 3.3 (37.9) | 6.7 (44.1) | 10.3 (50.5) | 14.3 (57.7) | 17.9 (64.2) | 19.8 (67.6) | 19.4 (66.9) | 15.6 (60.1) | 12.1 (53.8) | 6.6 (43.9) | 3.7 (38.7) | 11.0 (51.8) |
| Daily mean °C (°F) | −1.2 (29.8) | −1.2 (29.8) | 1.9 (35.4) | 5.2 (41.4) | 9.2 (48.6) | 12.6 (54.7) | 14.5 (58.1) | 14.3 (57.7) | 10.6 (51.1) | 7.2 (45.0) | 2.4 (36.3) | −0.3 (31.5) | 6.3 (43.3) |
| Mean daily minimum °C (°F) | −4.7 (23.5) | −5.0 (23.0) | −2.1 (28.2) | 0.7 (33.3) | 4.6 (40.3) | 8.1 (46.6) | 10.0 (50.0) | 10.0 (50.0) | 6.7 (44.1) | 3.5 (38.3) | −0.9 (30.4) | −3.8 (25.2) | 2.3 (36.1) |
| Average precipitation mm (inches) | 87.7 (3.45) | 75.6 (2.98) | 81.4 (3.20) | 84.9 (3.34) | 134.7 (5.30) | 140.0 (5.51) | 165.5 (6.52) | 152.1 (5.99) | 100.3 (3.95) | 88.4 (3.48) | 86.8 (3.42) | 105.2 (4.14) | 1,302.6 (51.28) |
| Average snowfall cm (inches) | 73.6 (29.0) | 86.5 (34.1) | 54.8 (21.6) | 37.5 (14.8) | 7.7 (3.0) | 0.1 (0.0) | 0.0 (0.0) | 0.0 (0.0) | 0.8 (0.3) | 9.3 (3.7) | 51.1 (20.1) | 76.1 (30.0) | 397.5 (156.5) |
| Average precipitation days (≥ 1.0 mm) | 10.2 | 9.9 | 10.8 | 11.4 | 14.2 | 14.3 | 14.0 | 13.5 | 10.6 | 10.2 | 10.0 | 11.2 | 140.3 |
| Average snowy days (≥ 1.0 cm) | 9.3 | 9.8 | 7.4 | 4.9 | 1.3 | 0.1 | 0.0 | 0.0 | 0.2 | 1.9 | 6.4 | 9.6 | 50.9 |
| Average relative humidity (%) | 68 | 68 | 69 | 70 | 74 | 75 | 75 | 77 | 79 | 76 | 73 | 70 | 73 |
| Mean monthly sunshine hours | 89.1 | 99.5 | 132.0 | 142.8 | 154.8 | 168.2 | 183.8 | 172.1 | 146.1 | 118.6 | 83.4 | 79.3 | 1,569.7 |
| Percentage possible sunshine | 50 | 51 | 49 | 46 | 43 | 46 | 50 | 52 | 52 | 52 | 47 | 46 | 48 |
Source 1: NOAA
Source 2: MeteoSwiss

== Transportation ==
Adelboden has only one incoming road connecting from Frutigen which connects via Spiez to the A6 and Bern. There is no transit traffic.

Frutigen is a train station of the Lötschberg line, connecting to Bern and Brig; it is connected to Adelboden by regular post bus services.

The Bunderchrinde Pass connects Adelboden to Kandersteg to the east, whilst the Hahnenmoos Pass provides a connection into the valley of Lenk to the west. There is an old mountain pass route via Engstligenalp and Chindbetti Pass to the Gemmi Pass and into the Valais. None of these passes carries roads, although they were used as trade routes in the past. Today, the Bunderchrinde and Hahnenmoos passes form part of the Alpine Pass Route, a long-distance hiking trail across Switzerland between Sargans and Montreux that passes through the village.

== Education ==
In Adelboden about 1,452 or (40.0%) of the population have completed non-mandatory upper secondary education, and 240 or (6.6%) have completed additional higher education (either university or a Fachhochschule). Of the 240 who completed tertiary schooling, 71.3% were Swiss men, 21.3% were Swiss women, 4.2% were non-Swiss men and 3.3% were non-Swiss women.

The Canton of Bern school system provides one year of non-obligatory Kindergarten, followed by six years of Primary school. This is followed by three years of obligatory lower Secondary school where the students are separated according to ability and aptitude. Following the lower Secondary students may attend additional schooling or they may enter an apprenticeship.

During the 2010–11 school year, there were a total of 447 students attending classes in Adelboden. There were 4 kindergarten classes with a total of 56 students in the municipality. Of the kindergarten students, 7.1% were permanent or temporary residents of Switzerland (not citizens) and 12.5% have a different mother language than the classroom language. The municipality had 13 primary classes and 245 students. Of the primary students, 4.9% were permanent or temporary residents of Switzerland (not citizens) and 4.5% have a different mother language than the classroom language. During the same year, there were 7 lower secondary classes with a total of 146 students. There were 3.4% who were permanent or temporary residents of Switzerland (not citizens) and 4.1% have a different mother language than the classroom language.

As of 2000, there was one student in Adelboden who came from another municipality, while 52 residents attended schools outside the municipality.

Adelboden is home to the Gemeindebibliothek Adelboden (municipal library of Adelboden). The library has (as of 2008) books or other media, and loaned out items in the same year. It was open a total of 0 days with average of 0 hours per week during that year.

In Adelboden there is a primary school, middle-school and a secondary school; the nearest special secondary school is in Frutigen.

Schools in Adelboden: There are four primary schools officially in the Adelboden school district, three middle schools (Realschule), and a secondary school (Sekundarschule). The nearest special secondary school is 20 minutes down the mountain in Frutigen and the nearest high schools (Gymnasiums) are in Thun and Interlaken.

== Notable people ==
A number of notable persons in cross-country skiing, mountaineering, and alpine skiing were born in Adelboden:

- Rolf Zurbrügg, Swiss national ski mountain trainer
- Frieda Dänzer, former Alpine skier and 1958 world champion
- Annerösli Zryd, 1970 world champion in Alpine skiing
- Marlies Oester, former alpine skier who competed in the 2002 Winter Olympics.

Italian/British writer Rafael Sabatini died in Abelboden and is buried there.

== See also ==
- History of skiing
- List of ski areas and resorts in Switzerland
