= Foo Pass =

Mountain pass in the Glarus Alps, Switzerland

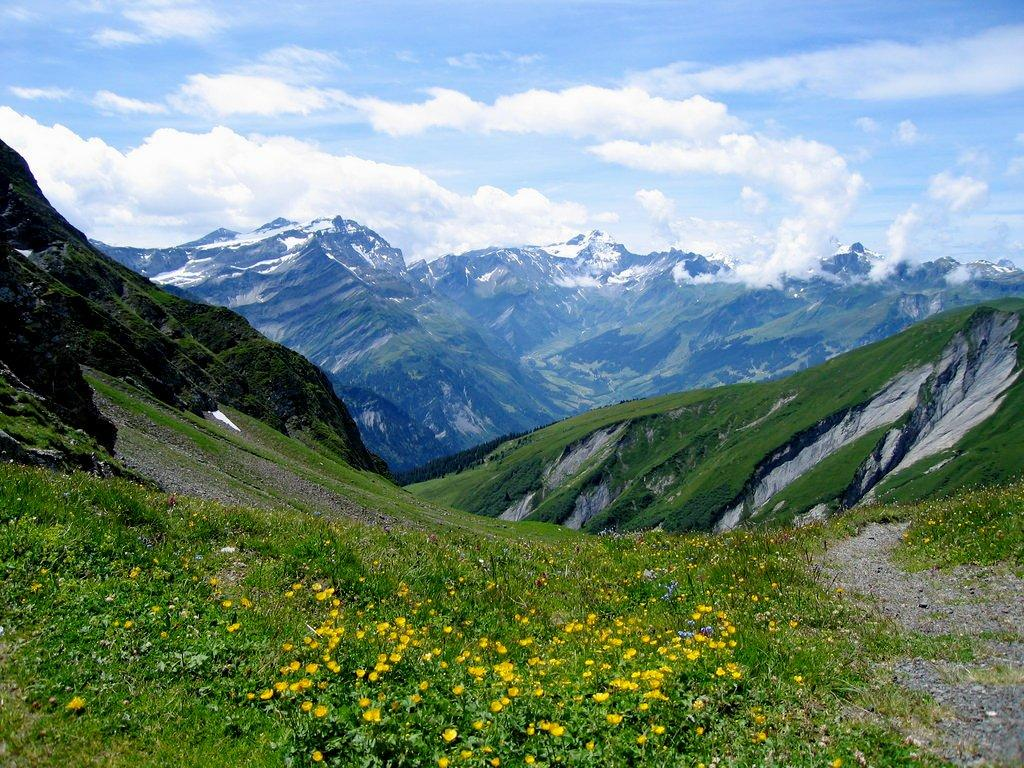
- View from the pass towards the canton of Glarus

- Location within Switzerland
- Interactive map of Foo Pass
- Elevation: 2,223 metres (7,293 ft)
- Traversed by: Trail

Third Approach
- Location: Glarus/St. Gallen, Switzerland
- Range: Glarus Alps
- Coordinates: 46°56′34″N 09°14′17.5″E

The Foo Pass (German: Foopass) is a mountain pass of the Glarus Alps, located on the border between the Swiss cantons of St. Gallen and Glarus, at an elevation of 2,223 m (7,293 ft). It crosses the col between the peaks of Foostock and Piz Sardona.

The pass is traversed by a trail, which connects the village of Weisstannen, in the canton of St. Gallen at an elevation of 1,004 m (3,294 ft), with the village of Elm, in the canton of Glarus at an elevation of 977 m (3,205 ft). The trail forms part of the Alpine Pass Route, a long-distance hiking trail across Switzerland between Sargans and Montreux.

The alpine pasture below the pass on the St Gallen side is notable for its marmot colony.

== See also ==
- List of mountain passes in Switzerland
