= Albristhorn =

Mountain in Switzerland

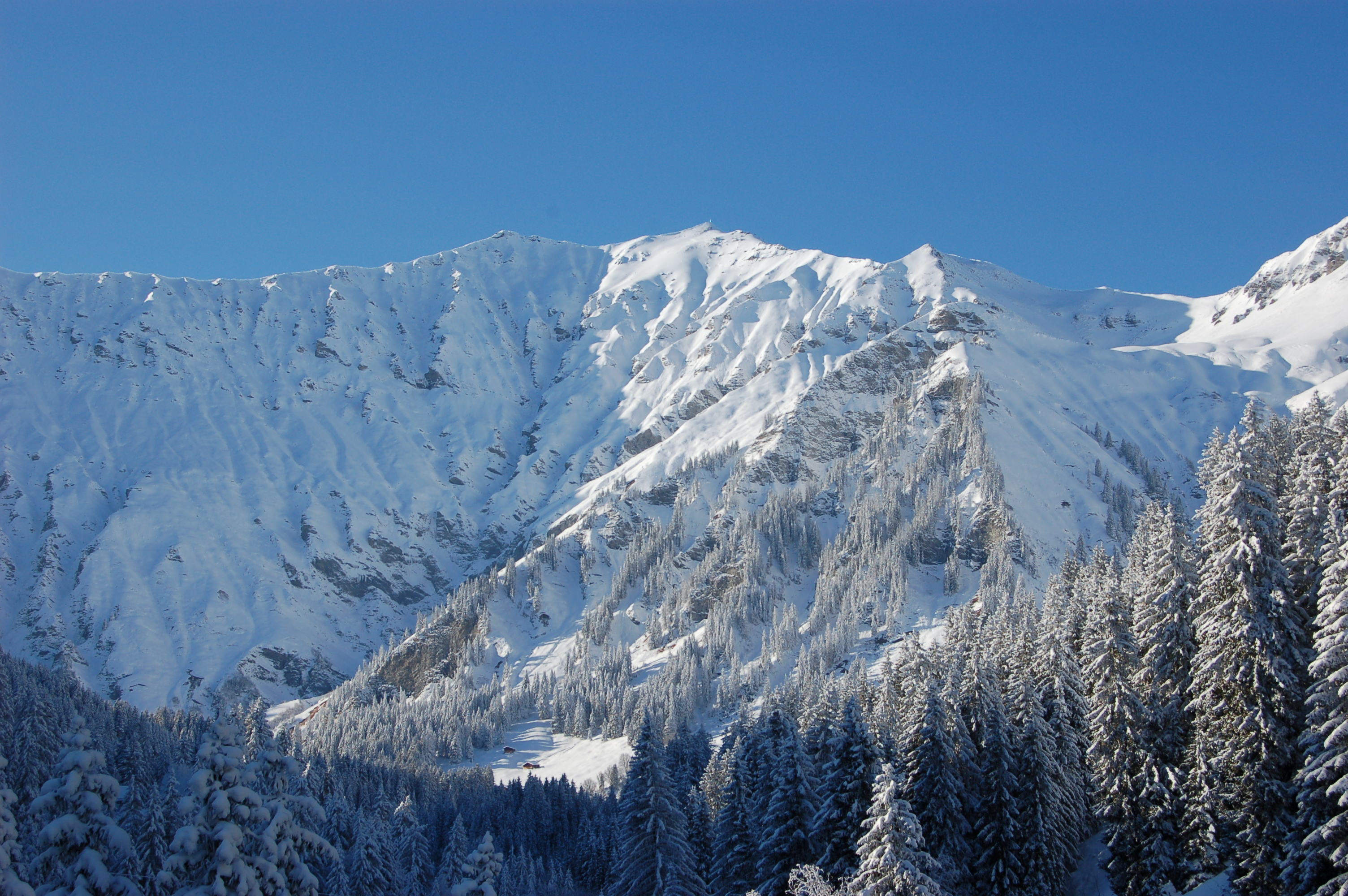

Highest point
- Elevation: 2,762 m (9,062 ft)
- Prominence: 812 m (2,664 ft)
- Listing: Alpine mountains 2500-2999 m
- Coordinates: 46°29′52″N 7°29′16″E

Geography
- Location within Switzerland
- Location: Bern, Switzerland
- Parent range: Bernese Alps

The Albristhorn (or Albrist) is a mountain in the Bernese Alps, overlooking Lenk and Adelboden in the canton of Bern. It is the highest summit of the chain lying between the Wildstrubel and Lake Thun and which is the watershed between the Simme and the Kander.

The summit is accessible to experienced hikers with a trail starting at Hahnenmoos Pass.
