= Alpine Pass Route =

Hiking trail

The Alpine Pass Route is a long-distance hiking trail through the Alps in Switzerland, part of the Via Alpina route. It starts in Sargans in eastern Switzerland, and crosses the heart of country westwards to finish in Montreux on the shore of Lake Geneva. The total route covers over 325 kilometres (202 mi) and crosses 16 mountain passes, and takes 15 or more walking days to complete.

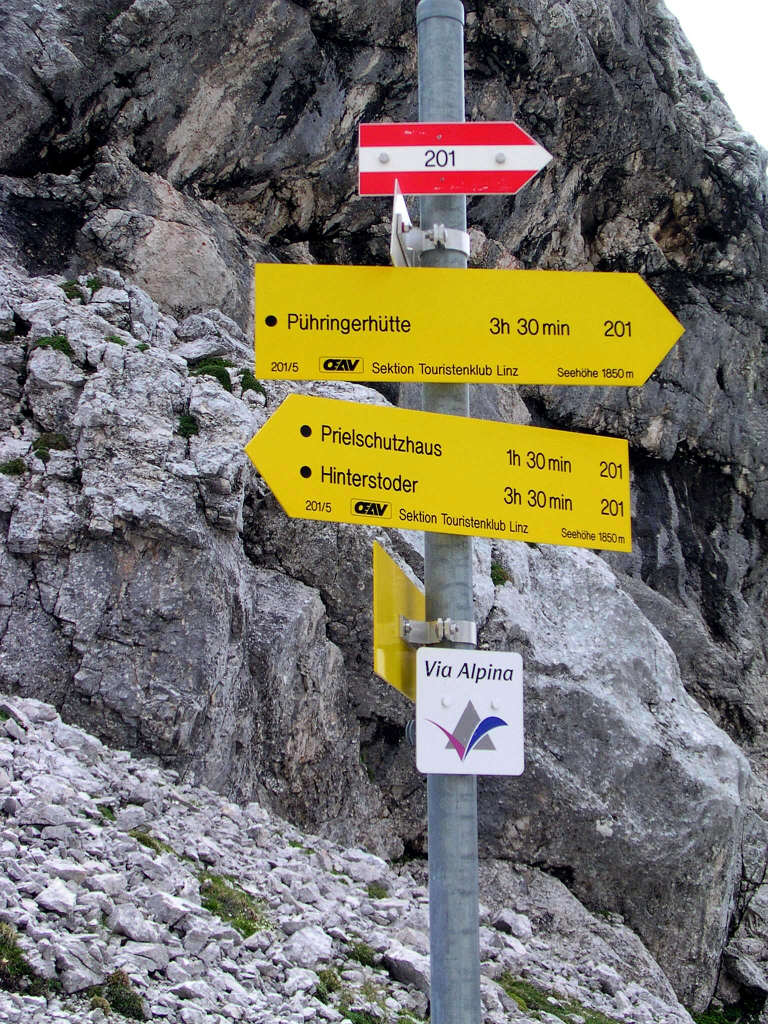
Via Alpina signage

== The route ==
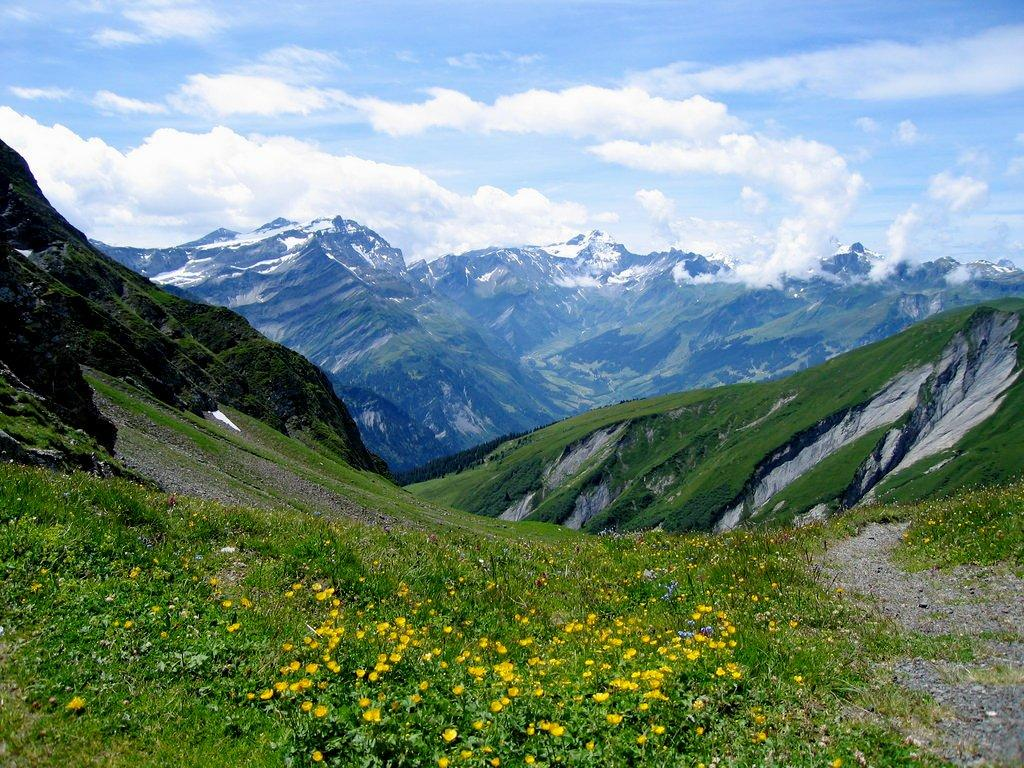
Foopass (between the cantons of Glarus and St. Gallen) view toward Glarus.

There are a number of variations on the precise route, but the following stages are fairly standard: The Via Alpina green trail follows the Swiss National Route no. 1 (previously known as the Swiss Alpine Pass Route from Sargans to Lenk, which then continues over a further four passes to Montreux.

- From Sargans over the Foo Pass to Elm
- Over the Richetli Pass to Linthal
- Over the Klausen Pass to Flüelen
- Over the Surenen Pass to Engelberg
- Over the Joch Pass to Meiringen
- Over the Grosse Scheidegg Pass to Grindelwald
- Over the Kleine Scheidegg Pass to Lauterbrunnen

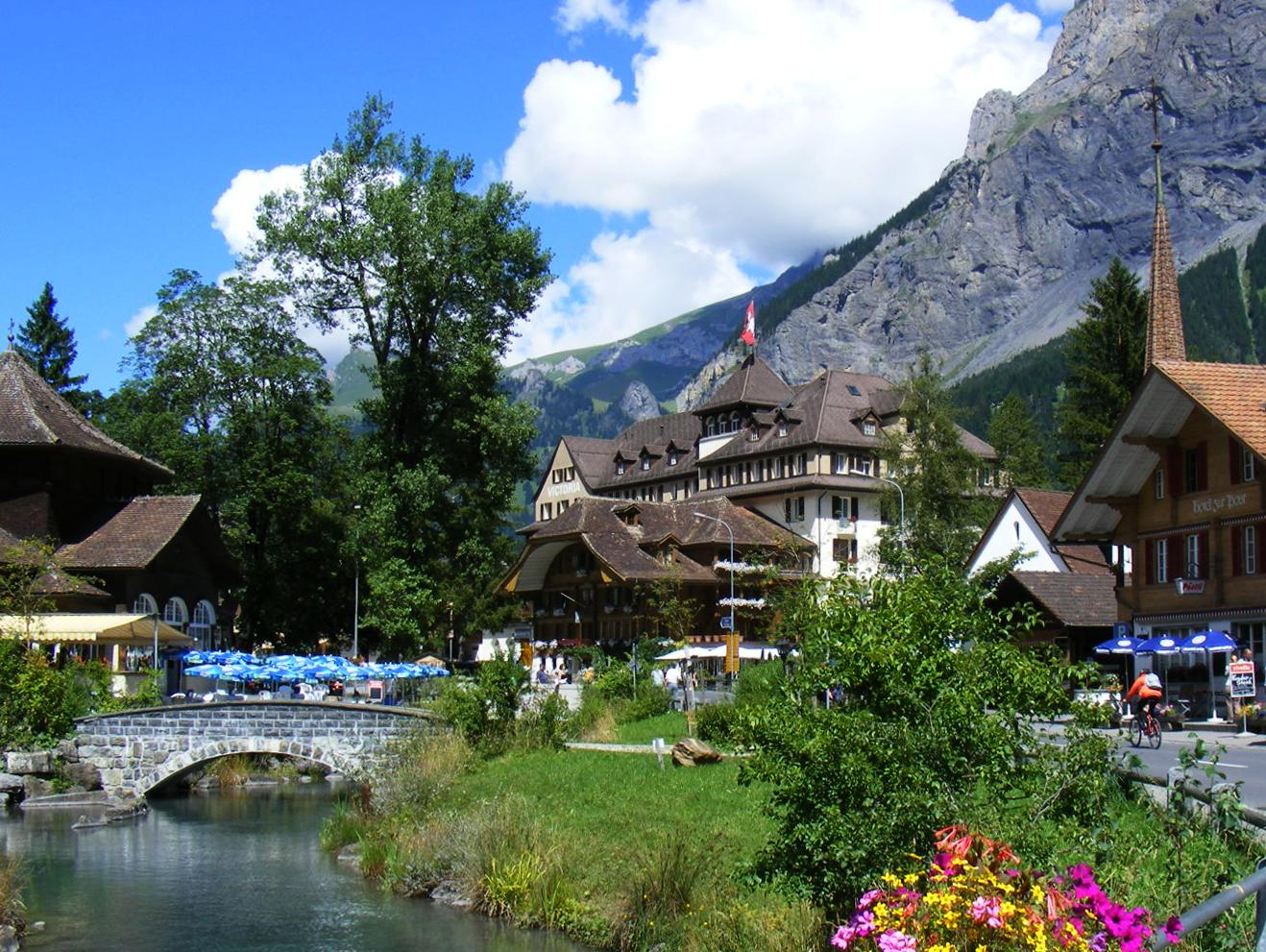
Kandersteg, a village in the Bernese Oberland

- Over the Sefinenfurgge Pass to Griesalp
- Over the Hohtürli Pass to Kandersteg
- Over the Bunderchrinde Pass to Adelboden
- Over the Hahnenmoos Pass to Lenk
- Over the Trütlisberg Pass to Lauenen
- Over the Krinne to Gsteig
- Over the Col des Andérets to Col des Mosses
- Over the Col de Chaude to Montreux

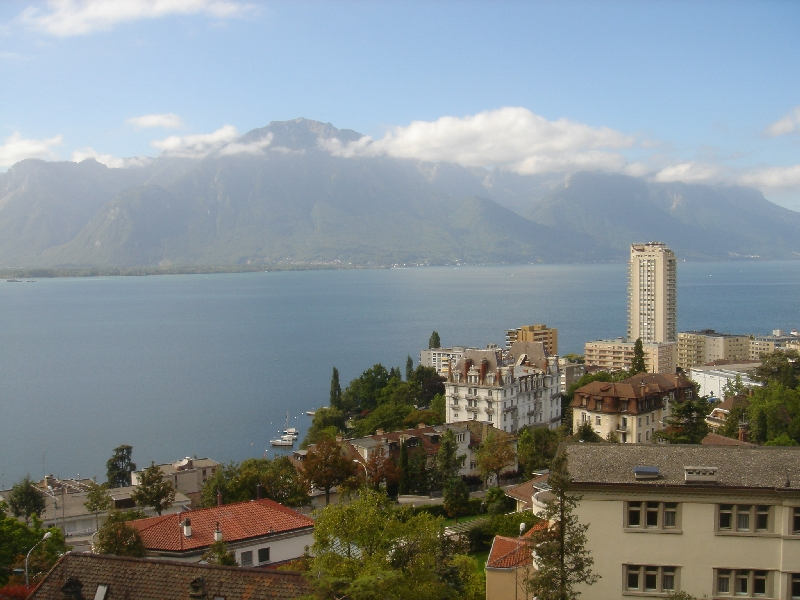
Montreux and Lake Geneva

The central portion of the route through the Bernese Oberland is the most spectacular, with many hikers choosing to hike a few passes rather than the whole route in one go. The excellent transport connections give many possibilities for breaking it up.

== Signposting ==
The trail is well signposted. Most of the signs carry the name of the next pass or town, but increasingly the green square "Via Alpina" signs are being introduced. This is now called route number 1.
