= Engstligenalp =

Plateau of the western Swiss Alps

Coordinates: 46°26′57″N 7°33′54″E

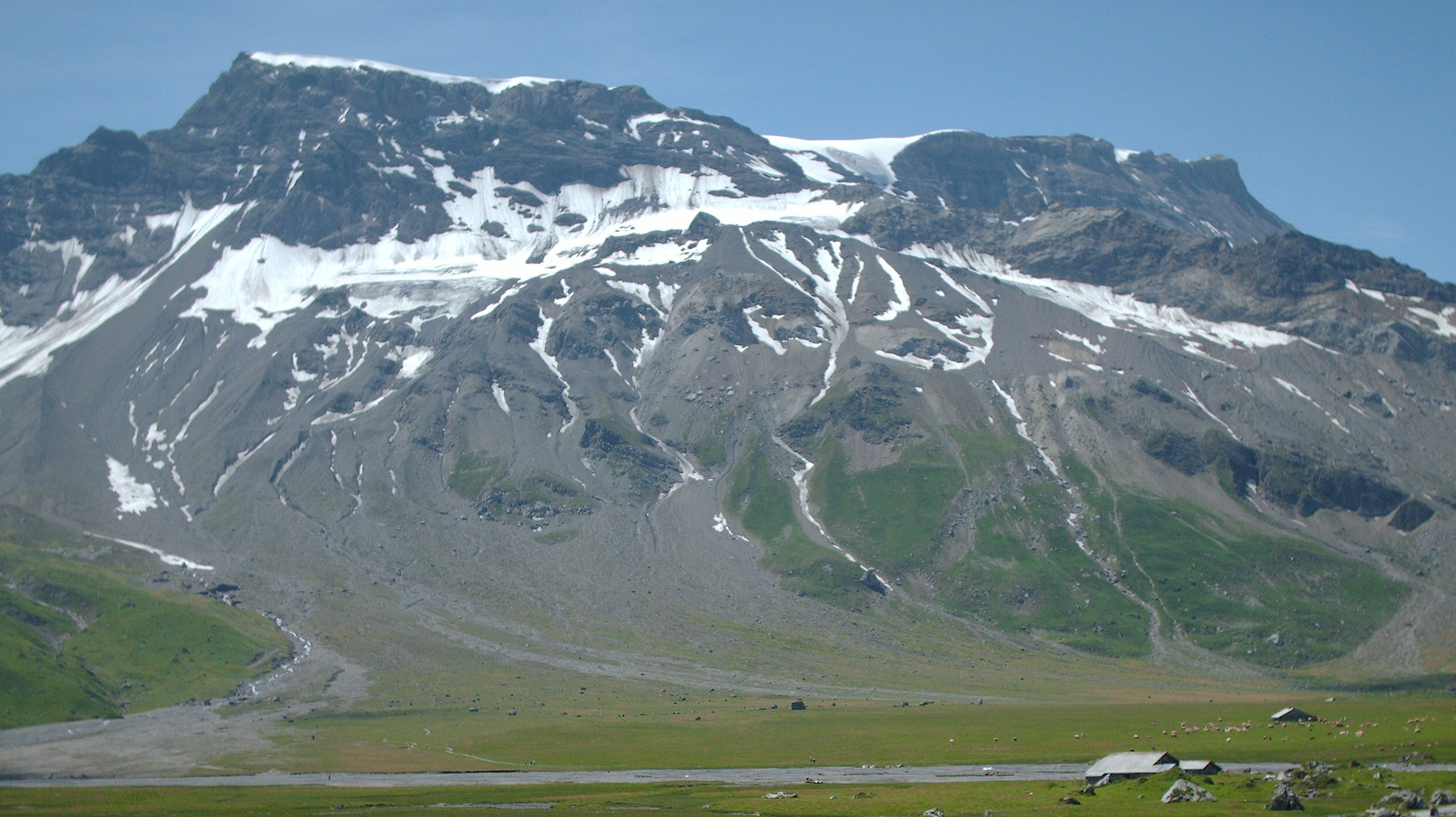
Engstligenalp and Wildstrubel mountain

The Engstligenalp is a plateau of the western Swiss Alps. It lies south of Adelboden at 1,900–2,000 metres (6,200–6,600 ft) above sea level. Since 1996, it has belonged to the Swiss culture landscapes of national importance.

The 7-square-kilometre (2.7 sq mi) plateau, which belongs to the community of Adelboden, has the form of an oval measuring in a north-south direction 1 kilometre (0.62 mi) and in an east-west direction 2 kilometres (1.2 mi) and is surrounded by mountains, dominated by the Wildstrubel in the southwest. It is covered by alpine pastures and crossed by numerous mountain streams springing from the slopes. At the exit of the valley, the streams join to form the Engstligen Falls which cascade in one of the most impressive waterfalls of the western Swiss alps 600 metres (2,000 ft) down to the Engstligen Valley. Access from the north is via a mule track blasted into the 600 metres (2,000 ft) high rock beside the waterfalls. Since the 1920s, there has also been a cable car. A hiking trail leads south over three mountain passes (Chindbettipass, Rote Chumme, Gemmi) to Leukerbad in the Valais, another leads west to the Lenk valley.

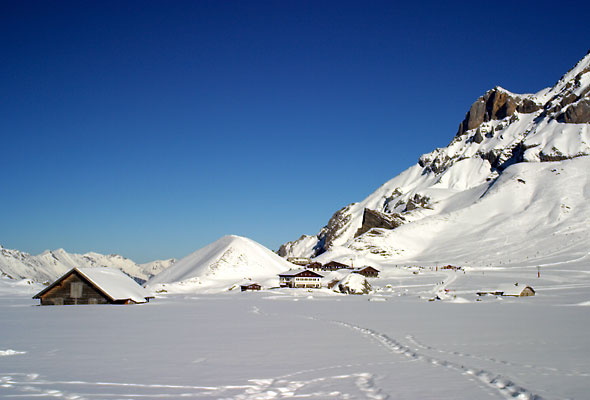
Engstligenalp

Since the Middle Ages, the Engstligenalp has been used as alpine pasture. Today it is owned by an alp cooperative of about 100 farmers from Frutigen and Adelboden. It offers from end of June to mid September pasture for 500 cattle (about one third cows, and one third calves) of the big brown-white Simmental race. A spectacular event is the alpine procession in June, when 350 cattle move up the steepest cow track in Switzerland through the rock wall. From the milk of the cows, the Alpine dairymen using old handicraft techniques produce a Bernese Alp cheese which is so searched for that it is sold in private and not available in open market. (Ernst Roth, z'Bärg im Frutigland, volume three of Wege zum Alpkäse)

In the 20th century, the Engstligenalp opened up to moderate tourism with two guest houses. In summer, it offers hikes and climbing routes and, as a specialty, a wheelchair route of 5 km including the necessary infrastructure in the two guest houses, offering to handicapped people the chance to enjoy an unspoilt alpine landscape.

In winter, there are two cross-country skiing routes and winter hiking routes usable from December to April on the plateau and a winter hiking path also usable for Nordic alpine hiking as well as several ski lifts at the northern slope offering easy and difficult downhill passages and a special area for off-piste snowboarding.
