= Engstlige =

River in Bern, Switzerland

Coordinates: 46°35′52″N 7°39′40″E

The Engstlige is a left tributary of the Kander in the Swiss canton of Bern, approximately 25 kilometers long.

== Geography ==
=== Course ===
The Engstlige river originates on the Ammertengrat ridge above the Engstligenalp.

It flows north through the valley named after it and receives several small mountain streams before forming one of the highest waterfalls in Switzerland, the Engstligen Falls.

Below Frutigen, the Engstlige flows into the Kander in a canalized riverbed. Over a length of approximately 25 km, it has a drop of around 1560 m.

=== Catchment area ===
The Engstlige's catchment area of 144.67 km² is drained via the Kander, the Aare and the Rhine to the North Sea.

It consists of 20.9% forested area, 45.7% agricultural area, 2.3% settlement area, 0.8% glacier, 1.2% water area and 29.0% unproductive areas.

The mean elevation of the catchment area is 1737 m, the minimum elevation is 754 m and the maximum elevation is 3229 m.

=== Inflows ===
The most important tributaries are the Allenbach and Tschentbach rivers.

- Tschingellochtigbach (right), 2.2 km
- Groppibächli (right), 0.7 km
- Lägerbach (right), 0.7 km
- Strubelbach (right), 2.6 km, 7.31 km²
- Stigwengbächli (right), 1.4 km
- Triestbächli (right), 0.5 km
- Wildibach (left), 0.8 km
- Chälibächli (left), 0.4 km
- Artelebach (right), 1.5 km (with Vorderer Artelebach 2.8 km), 3.14 km²
- Schnittegräbli I (left), 0.4 km
- Schnittegräbli II (left), 1.2 km
- Truniggräbli I (left), 0.3 km
- Truniggräbli II (left), 0.3 km
- Birggrabe (right), 1.4 km
- Willeschwandgrabe (right), 1.0 km
- Hundsgrabe (right), 1.3 km
- Huserweidgrabe (right), 0.4 km
- Allenbach (left), 8.5 km
- Tschentbach (left), 4.5 km
- Otterebach (left), 4.4 km
- Elsigbach (right), 4.2 km
- Helkegräbli (left), 0.5 km
- Ruessigrabe (left), 0.8 km
- Roufmattabach (right), 1.1 km
- Stiwidgräbli (right), 1.0 km
- Bollergrabe (left), 1.0 km

== Hydrology ==
=== Discharge values ===
At the confluence of the Engstlige and the Kander, their modeled mean discharge is 5.51 m³/s. Their discharge regime type is nival alpine and their discharge variability is 18.

=== Floods ===
The Engstlige can carry a great deal of water during snowmelt or after prolonged rainfall, becoming a raging torrent. Due to its tributaries from the Niesen mountain range, it carries a significant amount of sediment, considerably more than the Kander, which posed a major problem before the Kander was straightened.

== Bridges ==
39 crossings span the river: 18 road bridges, 17 pedestrian bridges, two farm track bridges, one railway bridge and one pipe girder bridge.

== Leisure and recreation ==
The impressive natural beauty, such as the waterfalls, attracts many tourists to the Engstligental Valley. The Pochtenkessel rapids below the confluence of the Tschentebach also attract tourists. Above Frutigen, the Engstlige forms a floodplain of national importance.

For canoeists, the Engstlige river from Achseten to the Frutigen gravel plant has a difficulty level of IV. The Pochtenkessel above Achseten is not navigable; the section above has a steep gradient and is very difficult.
