= Tschingel =

Tschingel (also Zingel) is a toponym of Central Switzerland. Properly referring to a horizontal rock face, it has in many cases been transferred to peaks, alpine pastures or settlements.

Tschingel may refer to:

- A village of Sigriswil, district of Thun, canton of Berne
- Tschingel (Oberhasli), peak
- Tschingel (Axalp), peak
- Tschingel, peak in Reichenbach im Kandertal municipality, canton of Berne
- Tschingel (Uri), peak in Wassen municipality, canton of Uri
- Tschingel Glacier
- Tschingel Pass
- Tschingelsee, a lake in the valley Kiental of the Canton of Bern, Switzerland
