= Mutthorn =

Mountain in Switzerland

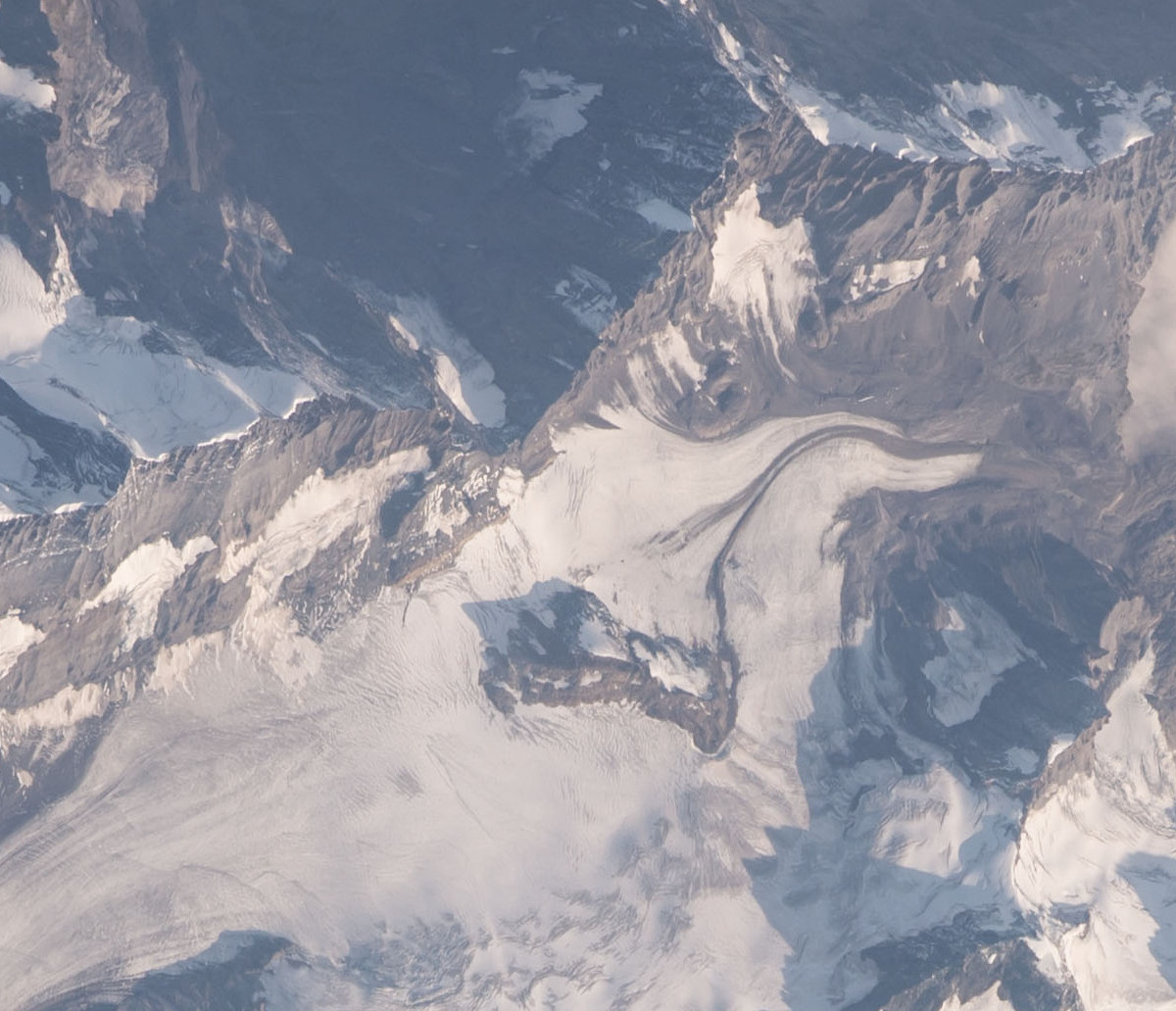
- Mutthorn, Tschingel Pass and Tschingel Glacier (ISS photo)

Highest point
- Elevation: 3,037 m (9,964 ft)
- Prominence: 160 m (520 ft)
- Coordinates: 46°29′20.5″N 7°49′16.7″E

Geography
- Location within Switzerland
- Location: Bern, Switzerland
- Parent range: Bernese Alps

The Mutthorn (3,037 m) is a mountain of the Bernese Alps, overlooking the Kander Glacier in the Bernese Oberland. It lies between the valleys of Kandersteg (west) and Lauterbrunnen (east).

The Mutthornhütte is located south of summit at 2,900 metres. It is owned by the Swiss Alpine Club.
