= Tschingel Pass =

Mountain pass in Bern, Switzerland

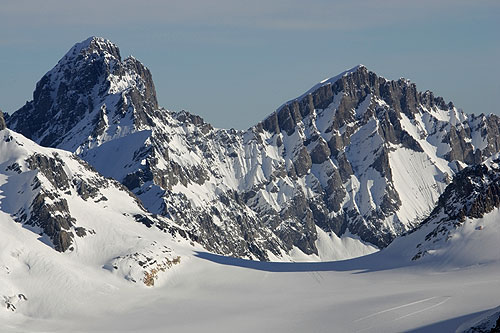
- View from the west side towards the Gspaltenhorn

- Location within Switzerland
- Elevation: 2,787 metres (9,144 ft)
- Traversed by: Glacier

Third Approach
- Location: Bern, Switzerland
- Range: Bernese Alps
- Coordinates: 46°29′30″N 07°48′58″E

The Tschingel Pass (2,787 m) is a high mountain pass of the Bernese Alps, connecting Kandersteg with Stechelberg in the Bernese Oberland. It is the lowest pass between the upper Kandertal and the valley of Lauterbrunnen. The pass is glaciated and separated the Kander Glacier from the Tschingel Glacier. It lies between the Blüemlisalp and the Tschingelhorn and is overlooked by the Mutthorn.
