= Mutthorn Hut =

Coordinates: 46°29′10″N 7°49′49″E

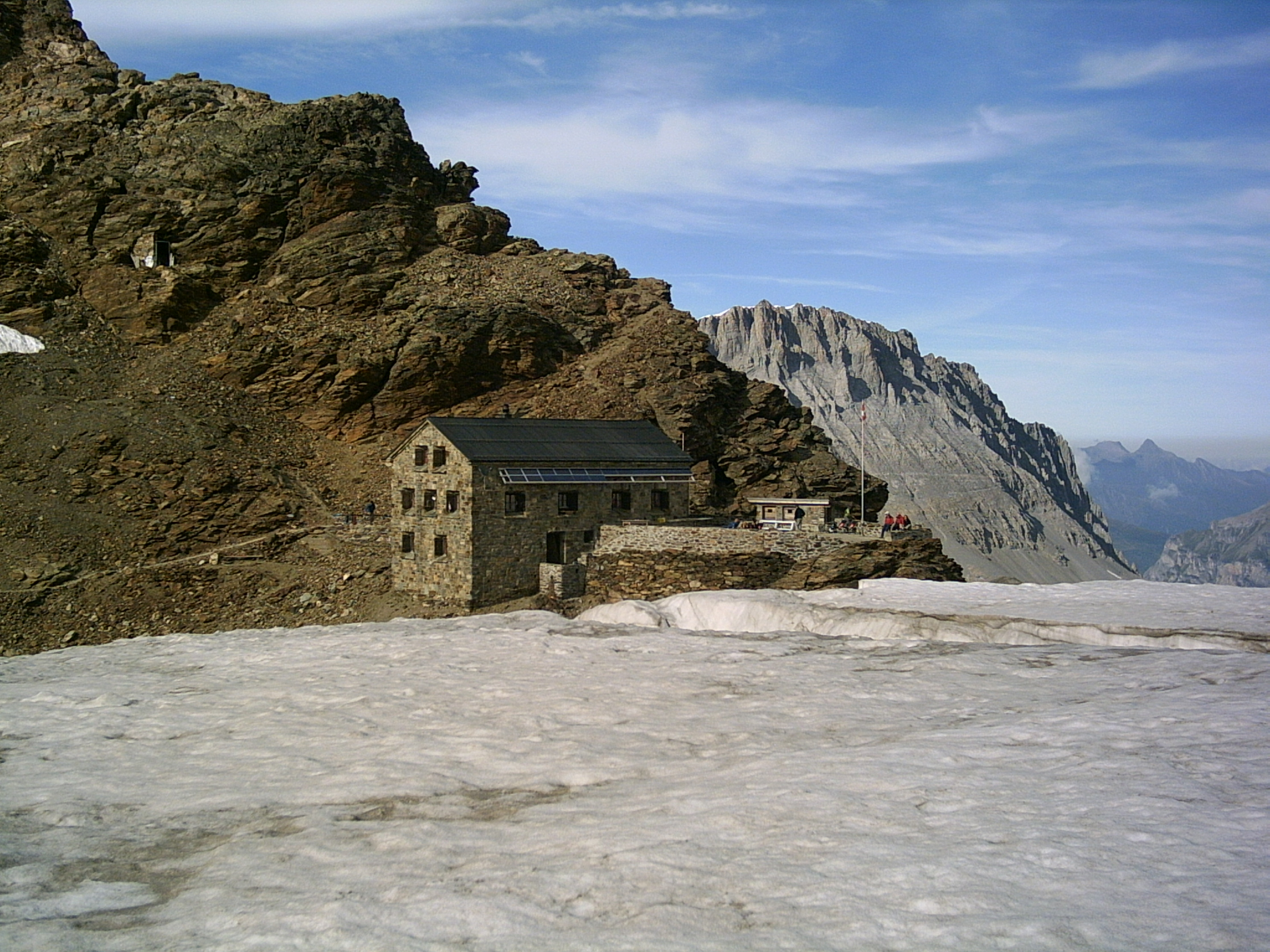
The Mutthorn Hut

The Mutthorn Hut (German: Mutthornhütte) is a mountain hut of the Swiss Alpine Club, located between Kandersteg and Lauterbrunnen in the canton of Bern. It lies at a height of 2,900 metres above sea level, above the watershed between the Kander Glacier and the Tschingel Glacier, at the foot of the Mutthorn.

All accesses to the hut involve glacier crossing.
