= Sackhorn =

Mountain in Switzerland

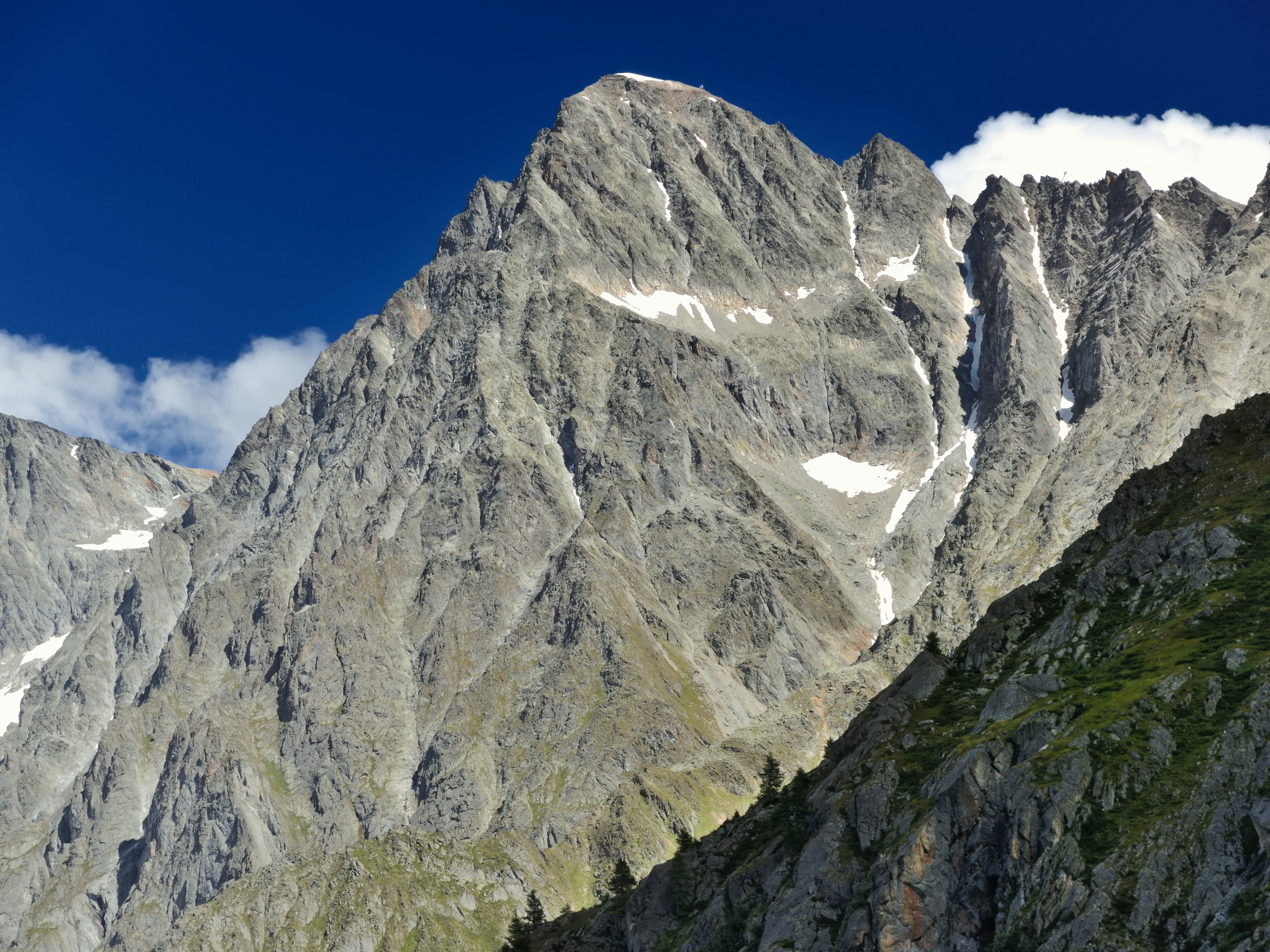
- The Sackhorn from the Gasterental (west side)

Highest point
- Elevation: 3,204 m (10,512 ft)
- Prominence: 112 m (367 ft)
- Parent peak: Birghorn
- Coordinates: 46°26′23.7″N 7°45′57.1″E

Geography
- Location within Switzerland
- Location: Bern/Valais, Switzerland
- Parent range: Bernese Alps

The Sackhorn is a mountain of the Bernese Alps, located on the border between the Swiss cantons of Bern and Valais. It lies on the range east of the Lötschen Pass, between the upper Gasterntal and the Lötschental. It lies approximately halfway between the Hockenhorn and the Birghorn.
