= Blüemlisalp =

Massif of the Bernese Alps

- Blüemlisalphorn
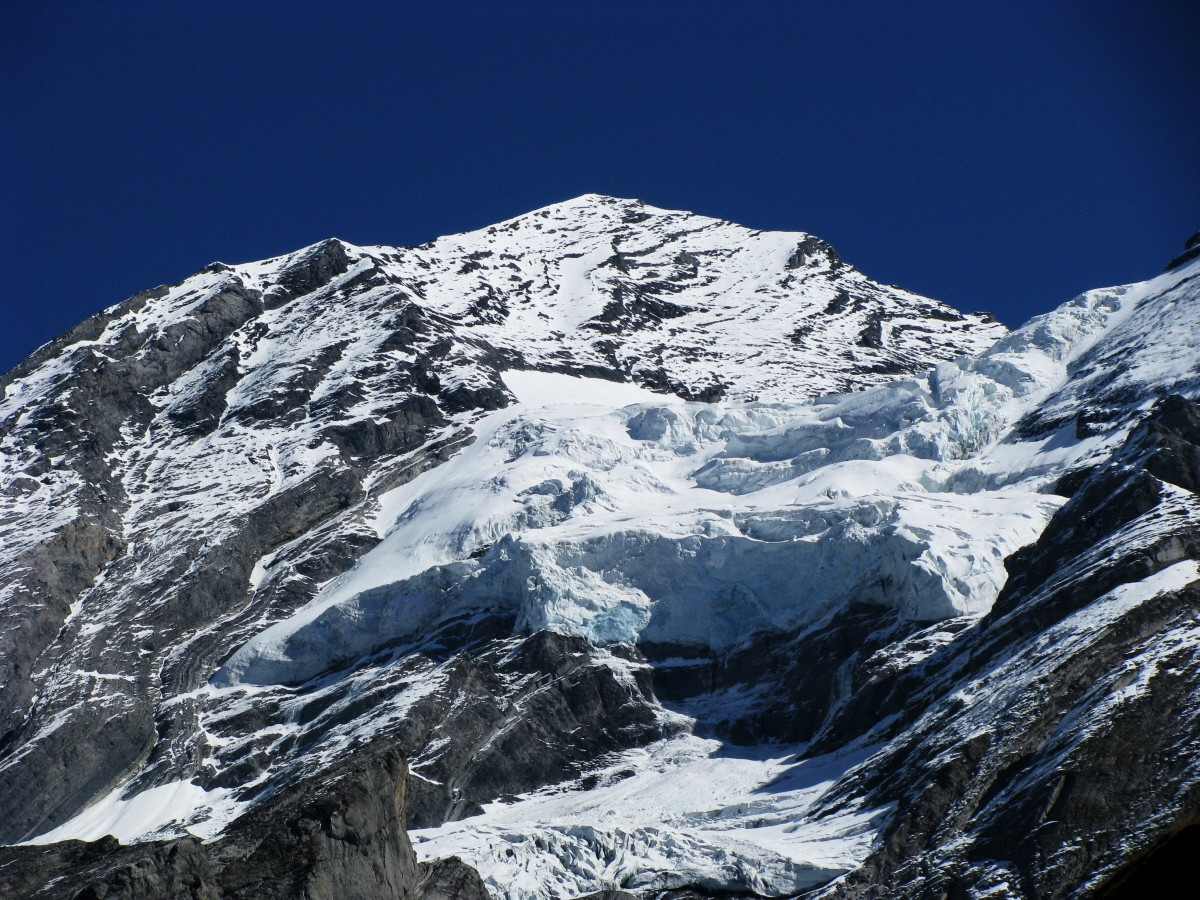
- Blüemlisalphorn from the west side

Highest point
- Elevation: 3,660 m (12,010 ft)
- Prominence: 896 m (2,940 ft)
- Parent peak: Finsteraarhorn
- Isolation: 7.0 km (4.3 mi)
- Listing: Alpine mountains above 3000 m
- Coordinates: 46°29′19″N 7°46′18″E

Geography
- Location within Switzerland
- Location: Bern, Switzerland
- Parent range: Bernese Alps

Climbing
- First ascent: 27 August 1860 by Leslie Stephen, Melchior Anderegg, R. Liveing, F. Ogi, P. Simond and J. K. Stone

The Blüemlisalp is a massif of the Bernese Alps, in the territory of the municipalities of Kandersteg and Reichenbach im Kandertal.

Its main peaks are:

- Blüemlisalphorn (3,660 m)
- Wyssi Frau (3,648 m) 46°29′35″N 7°47′0″E
- Morgenhorn (3,620 m) 46°29′46″N 7°47′28″E
- Oeschinenhorn (3,486 m)

The entire massif is contained within the canton of Bern, as it lies north of the main crest and water divide of the Bernese Alps. To the west, it is connected with the Doldenhorn group via the Fründenhorn; to the east, it is continued by the Gspaltenhorn. To the south, it is connected to the main crest by the Tschingel Pass.

Ascent is from the Blüemlisalphütte (2,840 m), over the glacier, past the Wildi Frau (3,274 m)

== Geography ==
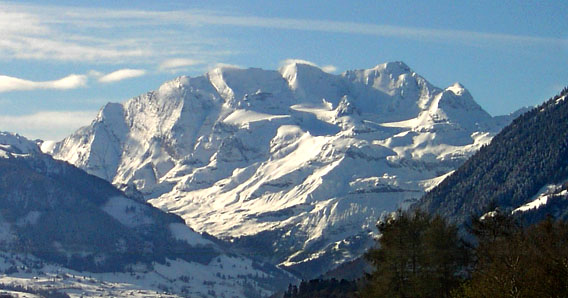
Blüemlisalp massif

The Blüemlisalp forms a ridge of great height, cut away in precipices on the southeast side, surmounted by four principal peaks, in the following order, reckoning from east to west: Morgenhorn (3,620 m), Wyssi Frau (3,648 m), the Blüemlisalphorn (3,660 m) and the Oeschinenhorn (3,486 m). To the southwest of the last peak, and between it and the Doldenhorn, is a minor summit — the Fründenhorn (3,368 m). In front of the main ridge, as seen from the northwest, e. g. from the Dündenhorn, are seen three minor peaks which project as steep islets of rock from the great glacier-fields that cover that side of the mountain. These are the Wildi Frau (3,274 m), the Ufem Stock (3,222 m), and the Blümlisalp Rothhorn (3,297 m).

The two main feeders of the Blüemlisalp Glacier (German: Blüemlisalpgletscher) flow downwards through the openings between the three last-named summits, but a short branch from the ice-stream that descends between the Wildi Frau and the Ufem Stock turns to the north, and flows into the head of the Kiental.

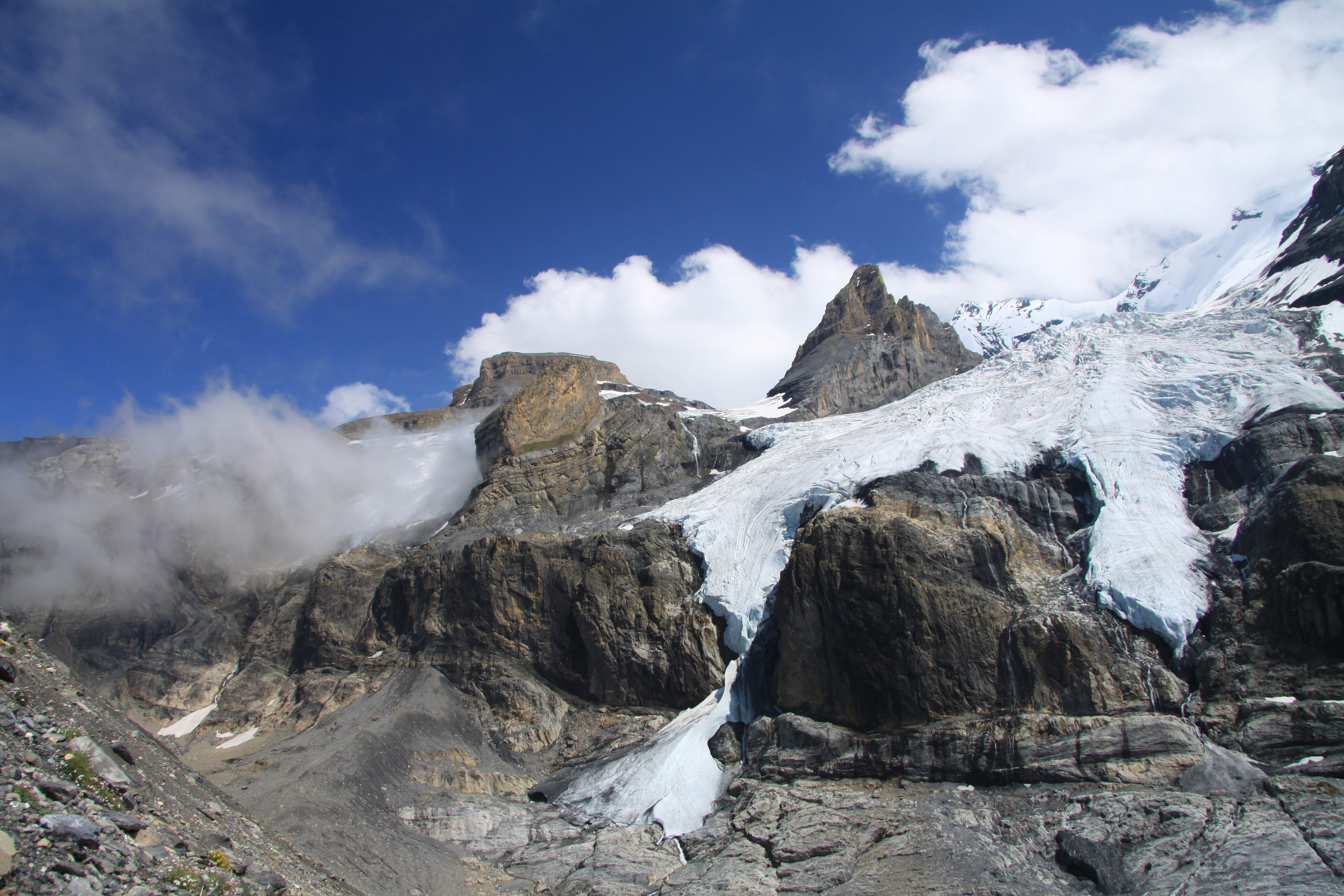
Blüemlisalp Glacier

== First ascent ==
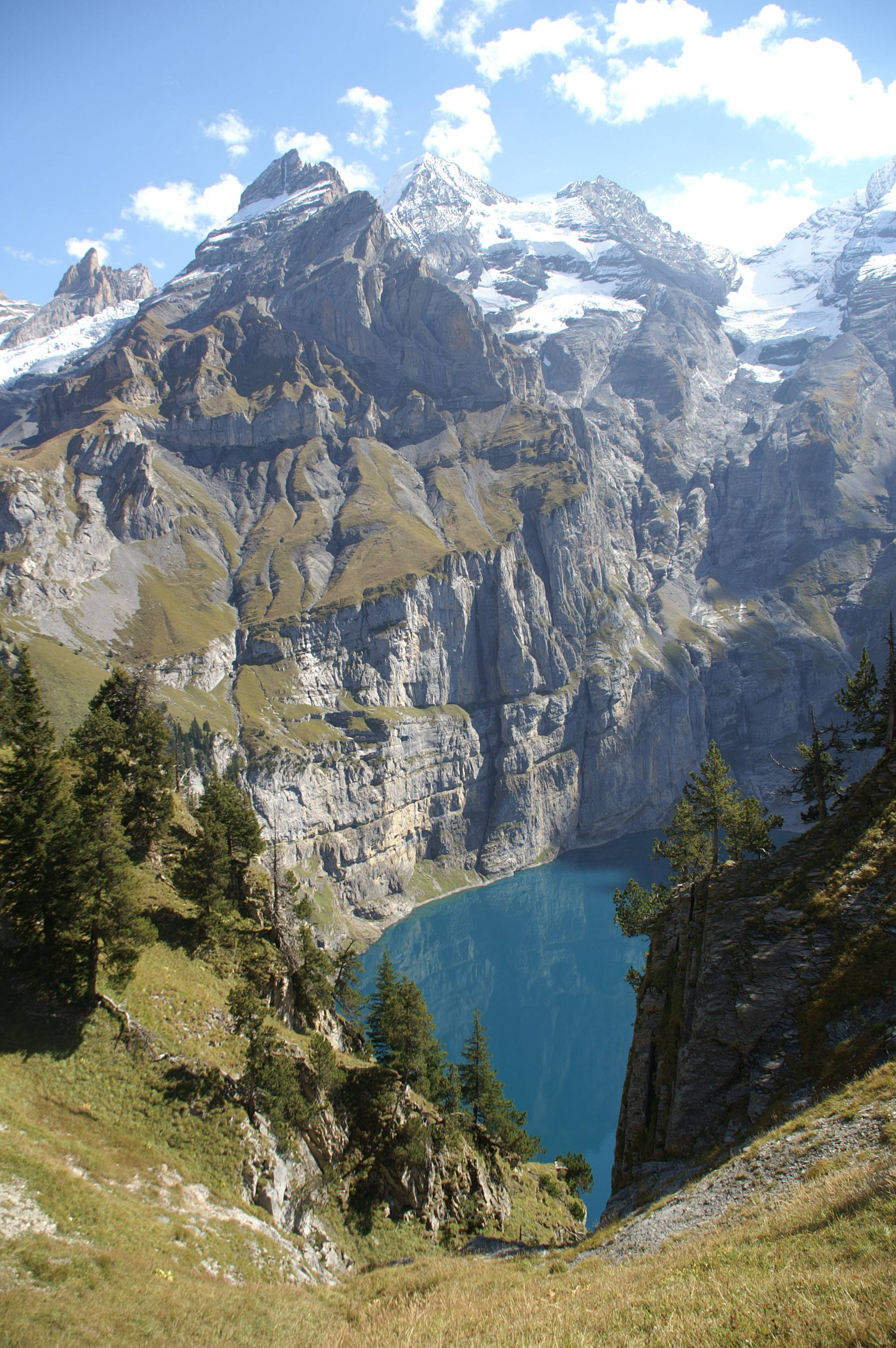
The Blüemlisalp (centre) and Lake Oeschinen

The highest peak was ascended in 1860 by Leslie Stephen, accompanied by R. Liveing and J.K. Stone, with Melchior Anderegg and Pierre Simond of Argentière as guides. Starting from the chalets of the Oeschinenalp at 2 a.m., they reached the ridge near the Dündengrat at 4.15. Then mounting over snowfields, and the glacier lying between the Wilde Frau and the Ufem Stock, they passed behind, or south, of the latter summit, and gained the depression between the Blüemlisalp Rothhorn and the highest peak at 6 a.m. They finally reached the top two hours later, Stephen wrote:

"We reached the top at 8 a.m., and had a grand view down the cliffs to the Tschingel Glacier, as well as a very fine view over the Swiss plains, and a general panorama resembling that from the Altels, returning easily to Kandersteg by 2 p.m."

== See also ==
- List of mountains of Switzerland
