= Hohtürli =

High Alpine pass of the Bernese Alps

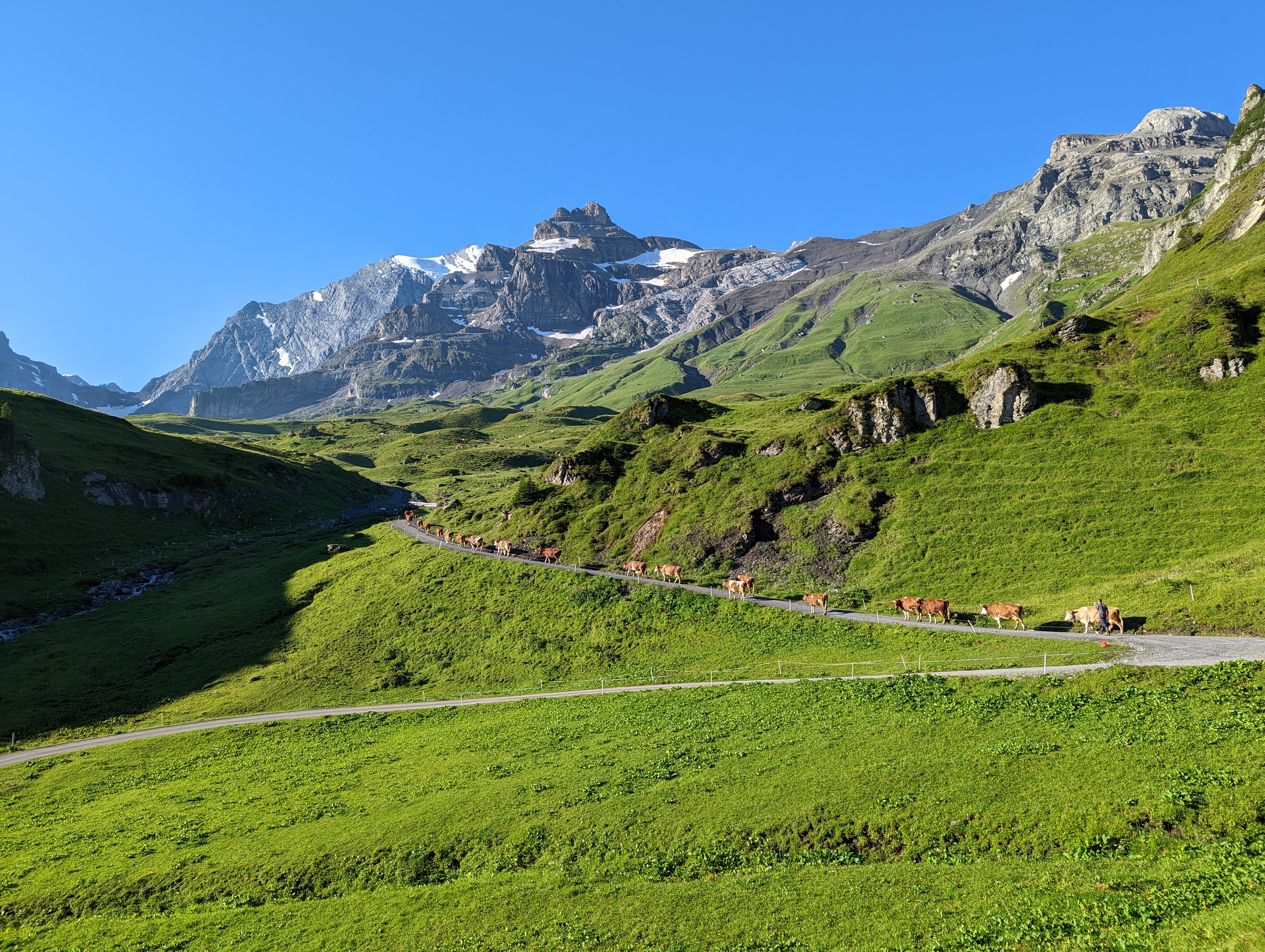

- Location within Switzerland
- Elevation: 2,778 metres (9,114 ft)
- Traversed by: Track or trail

Third Approach
- Location: Canton of Bern
- Range: Bernese Alps
- Coordinates: 46°30′40″N 07°46′12″E

The Hohtürli (Swiss German, literally means High Little Door) is a high Alpine hiking pass of the Bernese Alps. The pass crosses the col between the peaks of Wildi Frau and Dündenhorn, at an elevation of 2,778 m (9,114 ft).

The pass is traversed by a hiking track, which connects the hamlet of Griesalp, at an elevation of 1,408 m (4,619 ft) in the upper Kiental south of Reichenbach im Kandertal, at the entrance of the Kiental, with Kandersteg, at an elevation of 1,174 m (3,852 ft) in the valley of the Kander, the Kandertal. The track forms part of the Alpine Pass Route, a long-distance hiking trail across Switzerland between Sargans and Montreux, and the Hohtürli is the highest pass crossed by that route.

== See also ==
- List of mountain passes in Switzerland
