= Oeschinenhorn =

Mountain in Switzerland

- Location within Switzerland

Highest point
- Elevation: 3,486 m (11,437 ft)
- Prominence: 75 m (246 ft)
- Parent peak: Blüemlisalp
- Coordinates: 46°29′2″N 7°46′1″E

Geography
- Location: Bern, Switzerland
- Parent range: Bernese Alps

The Oeschinenhorn is a mountain of the Bernese Alps, overlooking Lake Oeschinen in the Bernese Oberland. It is the westernmost summit of the Blüemlisalp-main-ridge.
