= Birghorn =

Mountain of the Bernese Alps, Switzerland

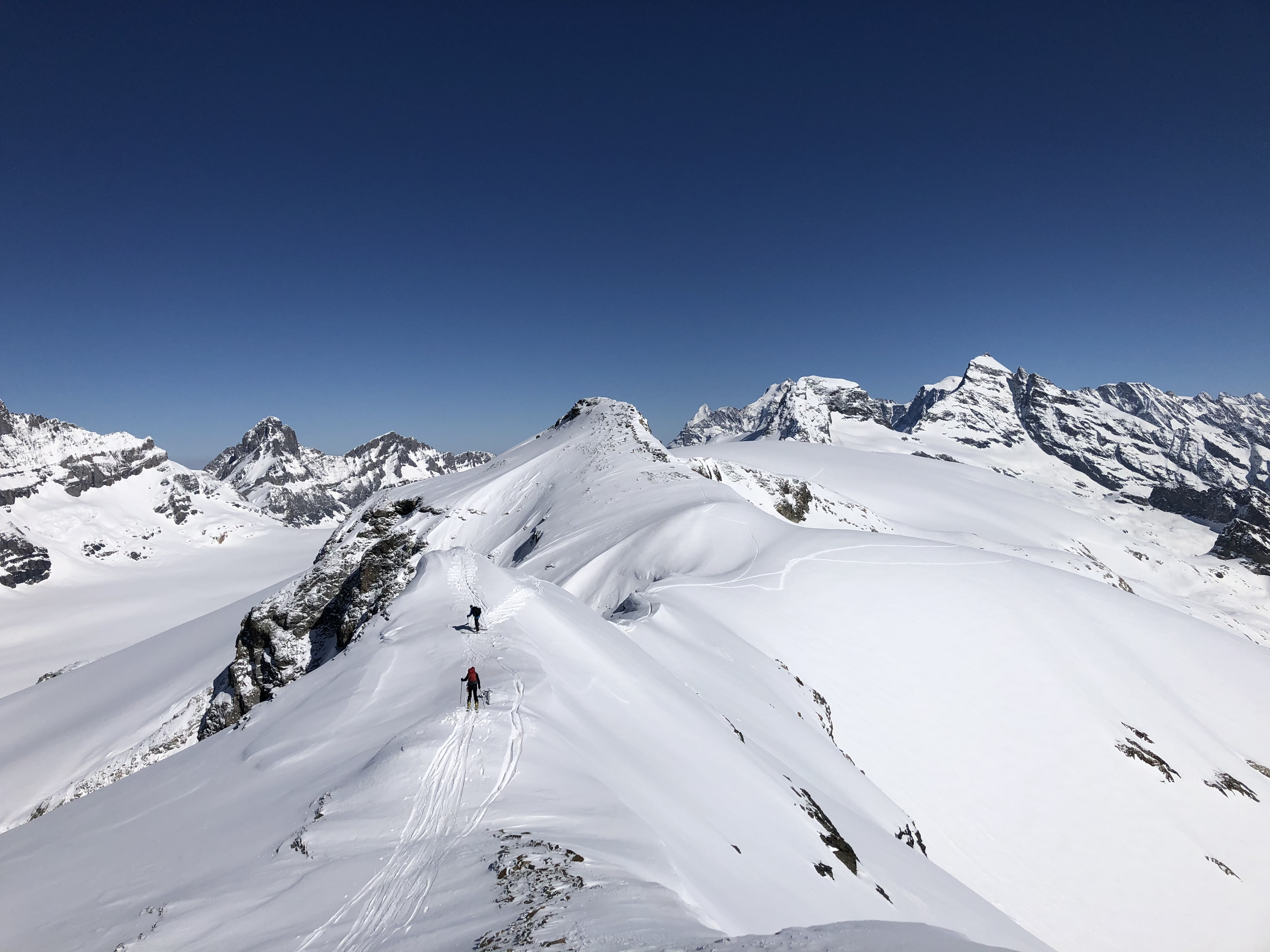

Highest point
- Elevation: 3,243 m (10,640 ft)
- Prominence: 134 m (440 ft)
- Parent peak: Finsteraarhorn
- Coordinates: 46°27′10.9″N 7°47′20.1″E

Geography
- Location within Switzerland
- Location: Bern/Valais, Switzerland
- Parent range: Bernese Alps

The Birghorn is a mountain of the Bernese Alps, located on the border between the Swiss cantons of Bern and Valais. It lies on the range connecting the Lötschen Pass from the Tschingelhorn, separating the upper Gasterntal (Bernese Oberland) from the Lötschental (Valais).
