= Bütlasse =

Mountain of the Bernese Alps

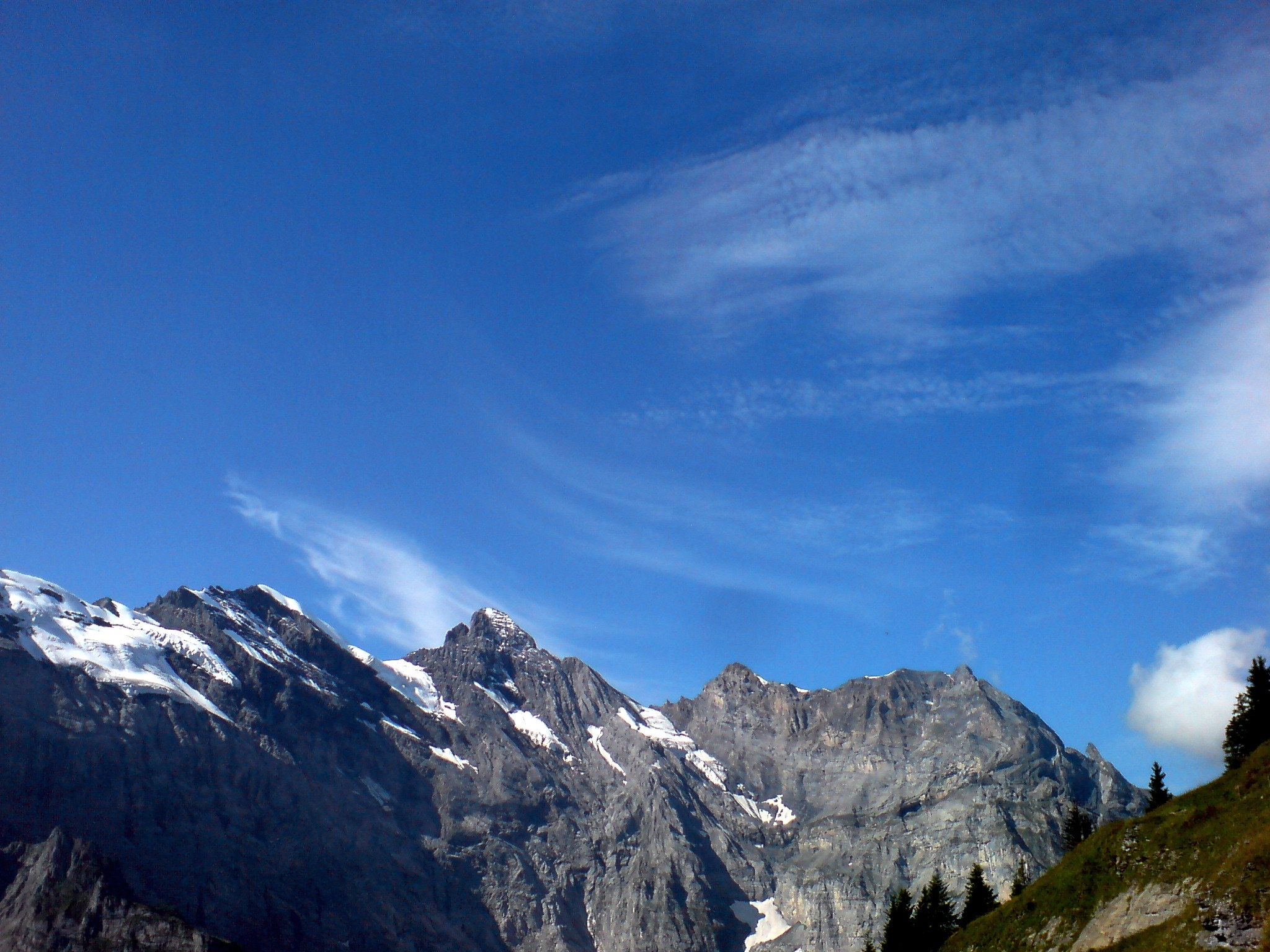
- Tschingelspitz, Gspaltenhorn and Bütlasse

Highest point
- Elevation: 3,194 m (10,479 ft)
- Prominence: 175 m (574 ft)
- Parent peak: Gspaltenhorn
- Coordinates: 46°31′7.2″N 7°49′11.6″E

Geography
- Location within Switzerland
- Location: Bern, Switzerland
- Parent range: Bernese Alps

The Bütlasse (3,194 m or 10,479 ft) is a mountain of the Bernese Alps, located north of the Gspaltenhorn in the canton of Bern. The Vorderi Bütlasse (3,062 m or 10,046 ft) is a minor summit situated north of the Bütlasse.

The closest localities are Griesalp (Kiental) and Gimmelwald (Lauterbrunnen). The Sefinenfurgge Pass, traversed by a hiking trail between Griesalp and Lauterbrunnen, passes to the north of Bütlasse.

== Gallery ==
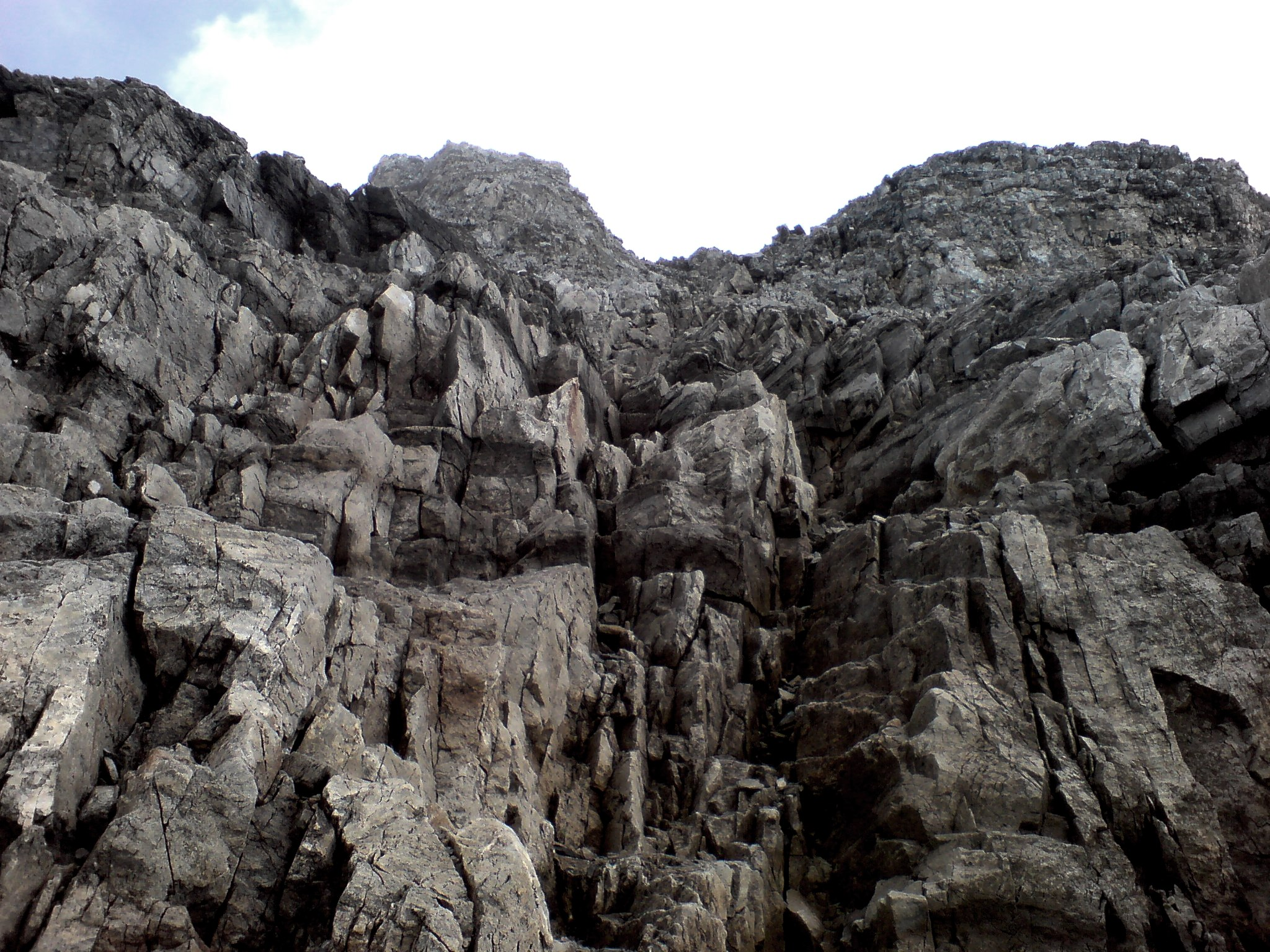
Normal route to the summit

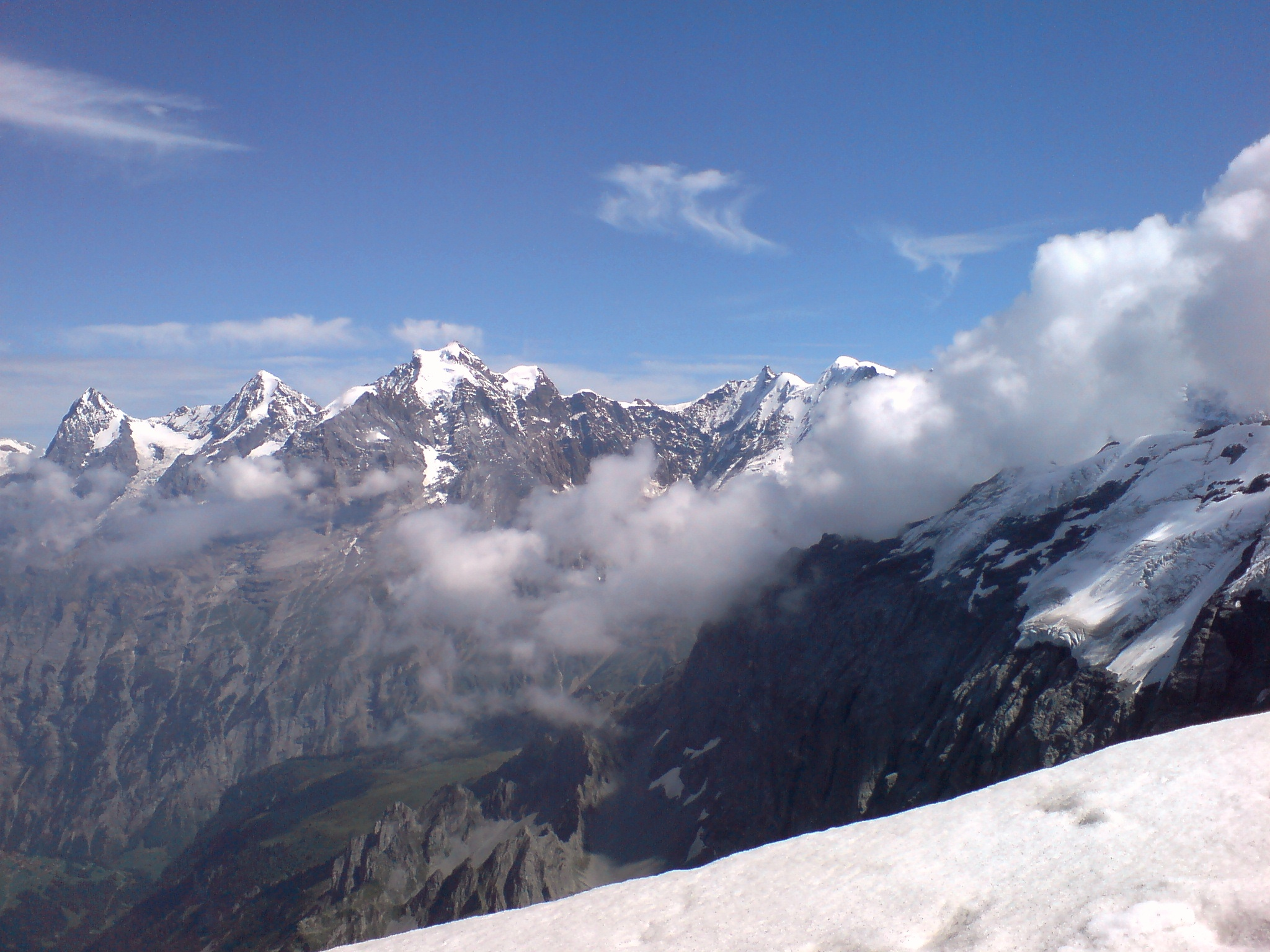
Eiger, Mönch and Jungfrau seen from the northern ridge

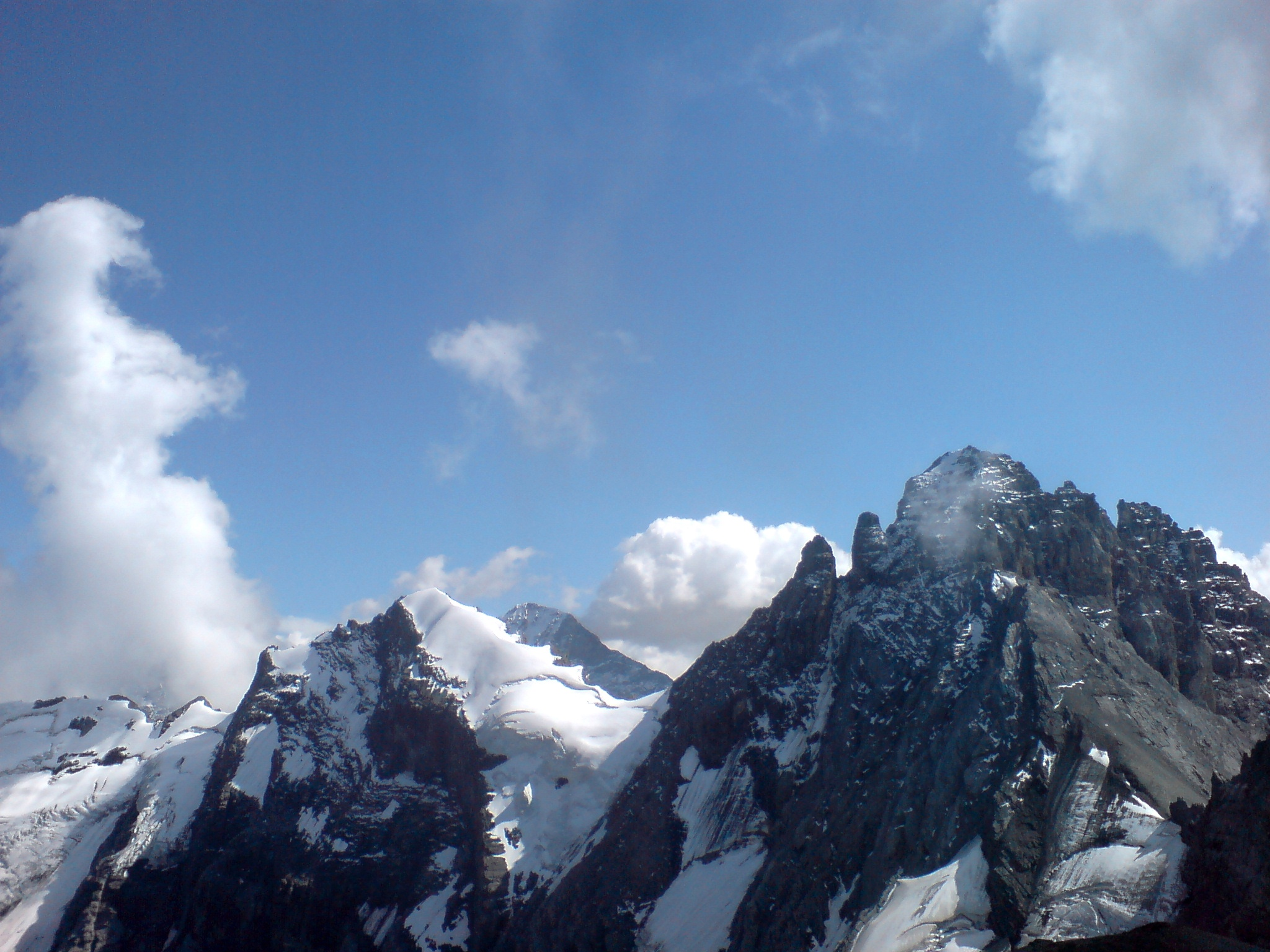
View of Gspaltenhorn from the summit
