= Fründenhorn =

Mountain in Switzerland

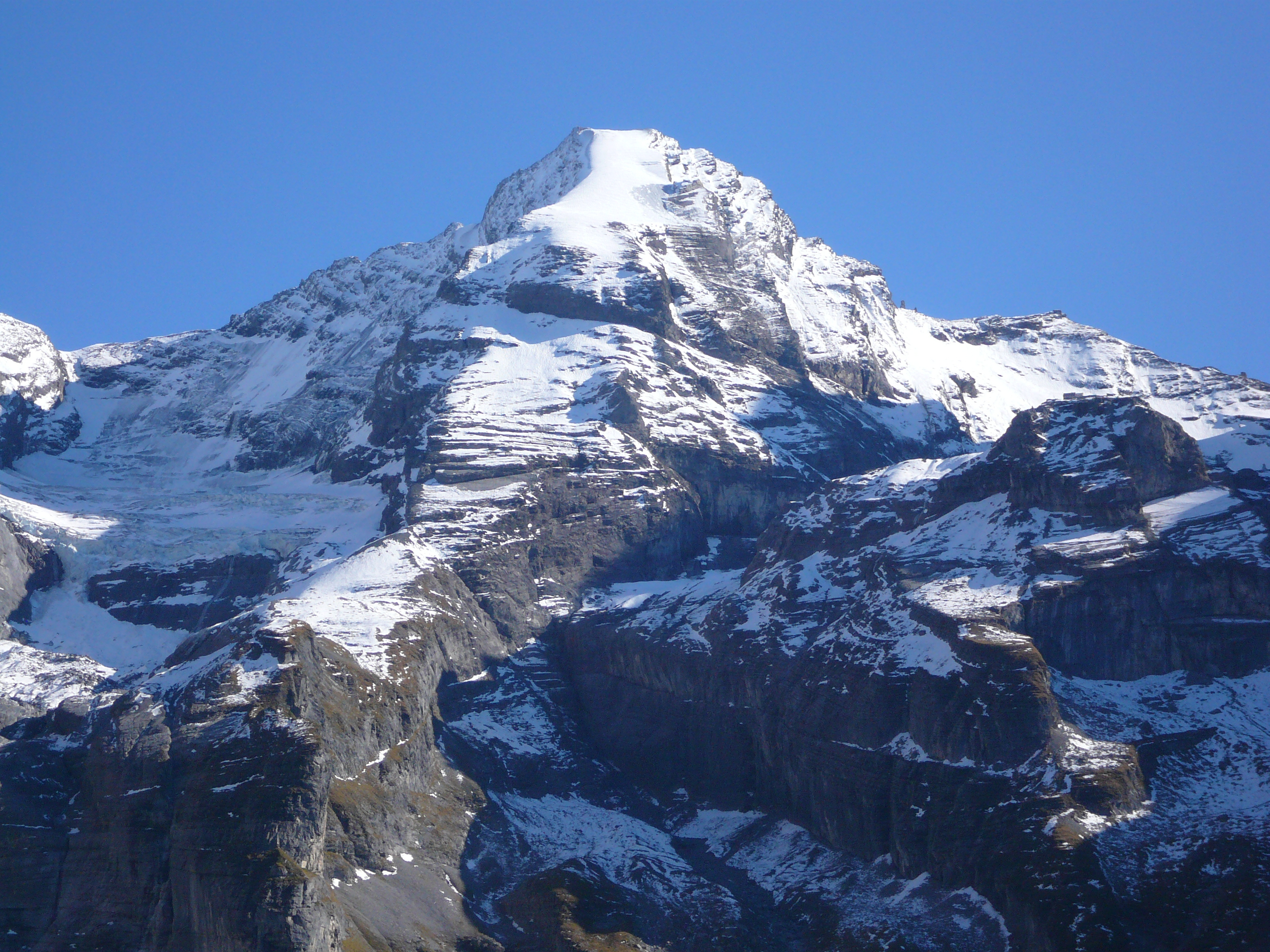
- View from the north side

Highest point
- Elevation: 3,368 m (11,050 ft)
- Prominence: 198 m (650 ft)
- Parent peak: Blüemlisalp
- Coordinates: 46°28′37″N 7°45′27″E

Geography
- Location within Switzerland
- Location: Bern, Switzerland
- Parent range: Bernese Alps

The Fründenhorn is a mountain of the Bernese Alps, overlooking Lake Oeschinen in the Bernese Oberland.
