= Wildi Frau =

Mountain of the Bernese Alps

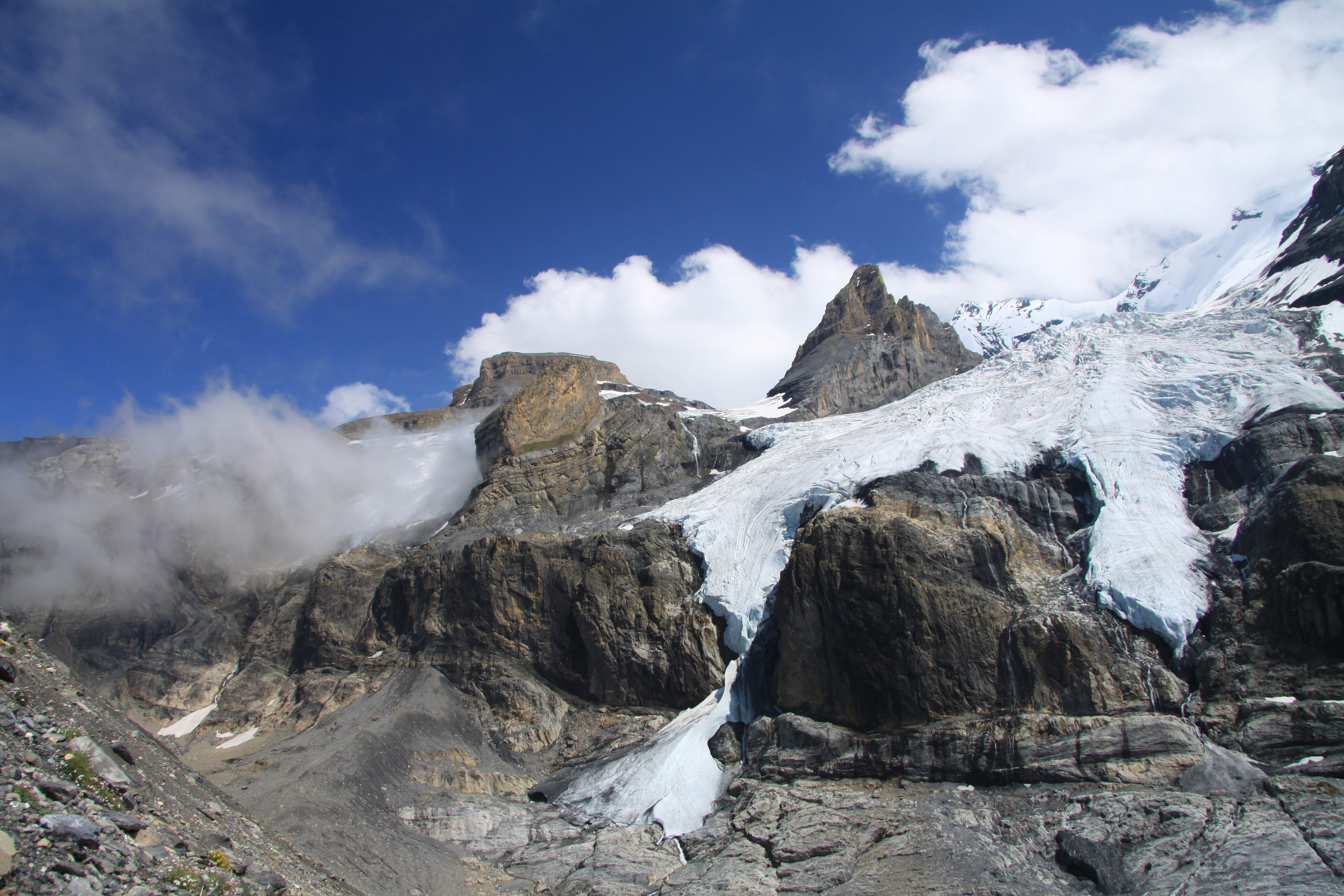
- The Wildi Frau (centre left) and the Ufem Stock (centre right)

Highest point
- Elevation: 3,274 m (10,741 ft)
- Prominence: 155 m (509 ft)
- Parent peak: Blüemlisalp
- Coordinates: 46°30′15″N 7°46′48″E

Geography
- Location within Switzerland
- Location: Bern, Switzerland
- Parent range: Bernese Alps

The Wildi Frau (Swiss German, literally meaning the Wild Woman) is a mountain of the Bernese Alps, overlooking the Hohtürli Pass in the Bernese Oberland. It lies between the valleys of Kandersteg and Kiental, north of the Blüemlisalp. It lies 60 km to the southwest of the capital, Bern. Its highest point is at 3,274 m (10,741 ft) above the sea level. The width on its base is 0.65 km.

The terrain around the Wildi Frau is mainly rocky. The nearest peak is the Wyssi Frau, at 3,648 m above the sea level, 1.4 km at the south of the Wildi Frau. The nearest community is Frutigen, 13.6 km at the northwest of Wildi Frau.

The area around the Wildi Frau is permanently covered with ice and snow and very sparsely populated, with 6 inhabitants per square kilometer.
