= Kander Neve =

Glacier of the Bernese Alps

Kanderfirn
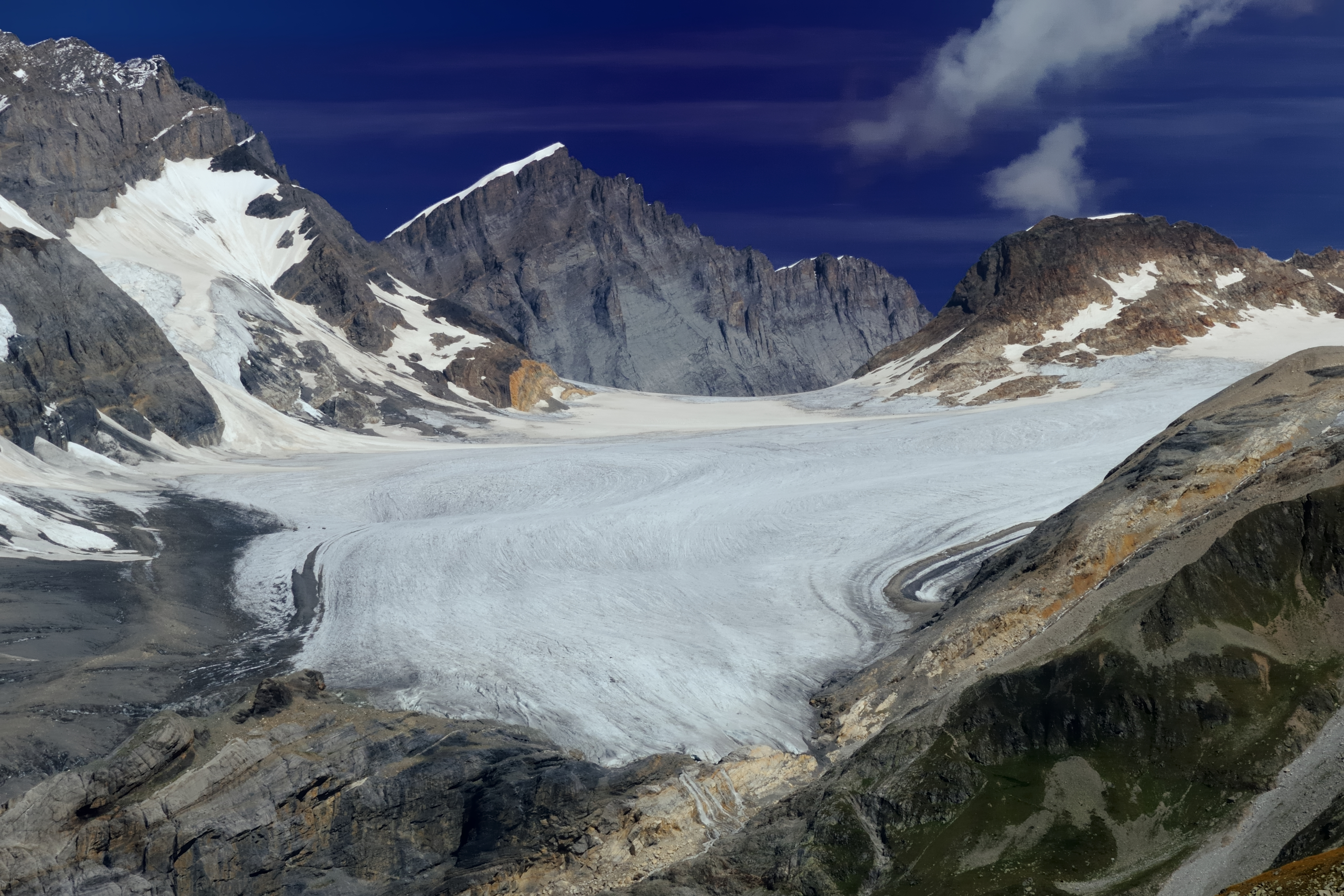
- View from the southwest towards the Tschingel Pass

- Location within Switzerland Location within Alps
- Interactive map of Kanderfirn
- Location: Bern, Switzerland
- Coordinates: 46°28′39″N 7°47′27″E
- Length: 6.6 km (4.1 mi)
- Status: Retreating

The Kander Neve (German: Kanderfirn) is a 6.6 km (4.1 mi) long glacier (2005) of the Bernese Alps, situated south of Kandersteg in the canton of Bern. The glacier lies at the upper end of the Gasterental, at the foot of the Blüemlisalp and the Tschingelhorn. It borders the valley of Lauterbrunnen on the east (Tschingel Pass) and the canton of Valais on the south (Petersgrat). In 1973 it had an area of 13.9 km^{2} (5.4 sq mi).

The glacier feeds the head waters of the Kander, a river that flows into Lake Thun, and hence into the Aare and the Rhine.

== See also ==
- List of glaciers in Switzerland
- Swiss Alps
