= Gspaltenhorn =

Mountain of the Bernese Alps

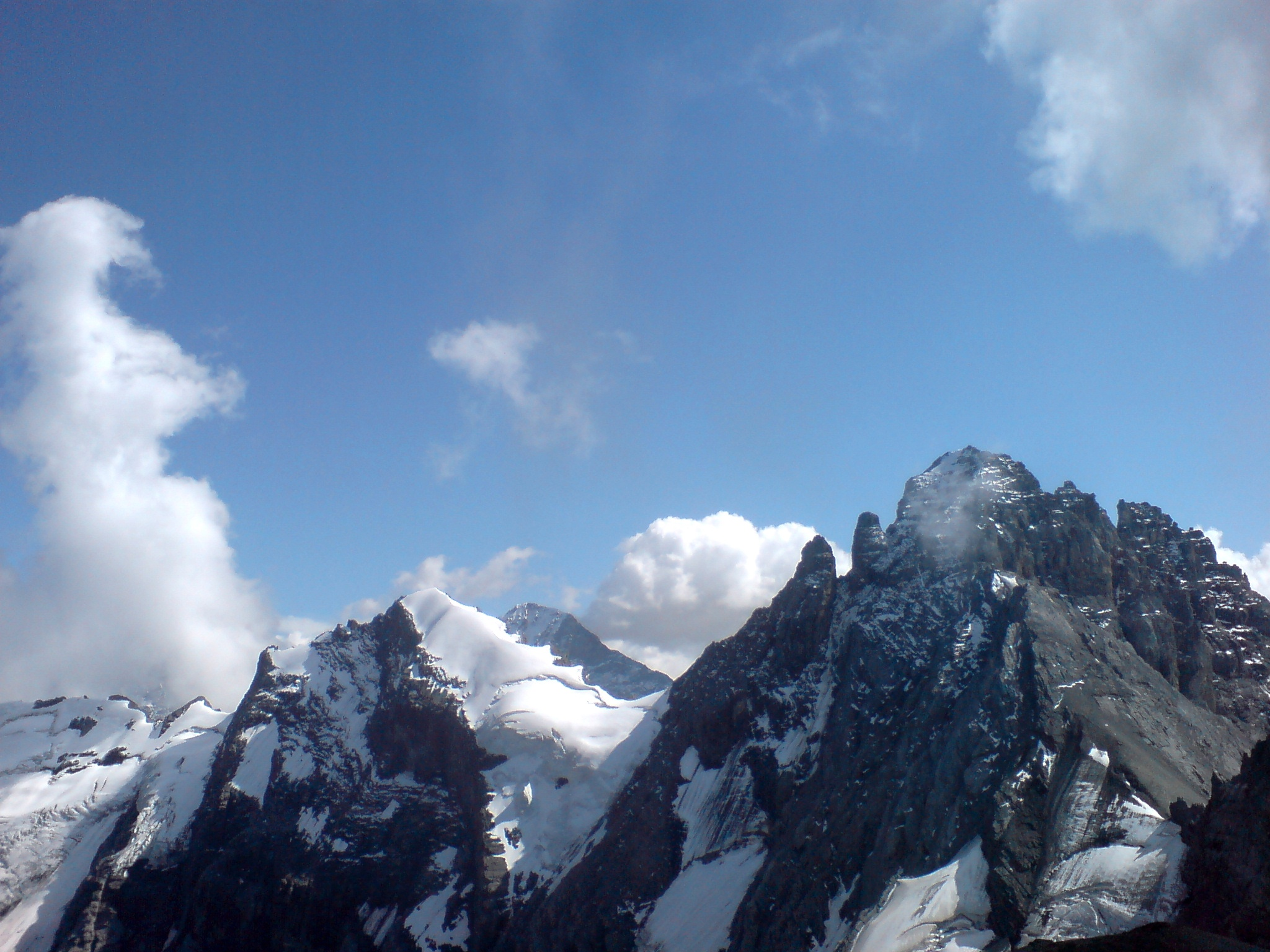
- The Tschingelspitz (left) and the Gspaltenhorn (right) from the Bütlasse

Highest point
- Elevation: 3,436 m (11,273 ft)
- Prominence: 600 m (2,000 ft)
- Parent peak: Blüemlisalp
- Listing: Alpine mountains above 3000 m
- Coordinates: 46°30′41″N 7°49′40″E

Geography
- Location within Switzerland
- Location: Bern, Switzerland
- Parent range: Bernese Alps

The Gspaltenhorn is a mountain of the Bernese Alps, located between the valleys of Kiental and Lauterbrunnen in the canton of Bern. With an elevation of 3,436 metres above sea level, the Gspaltenhorn is the highest summit of the range lying north-east of the Gamchilücke pass (2,836 m).

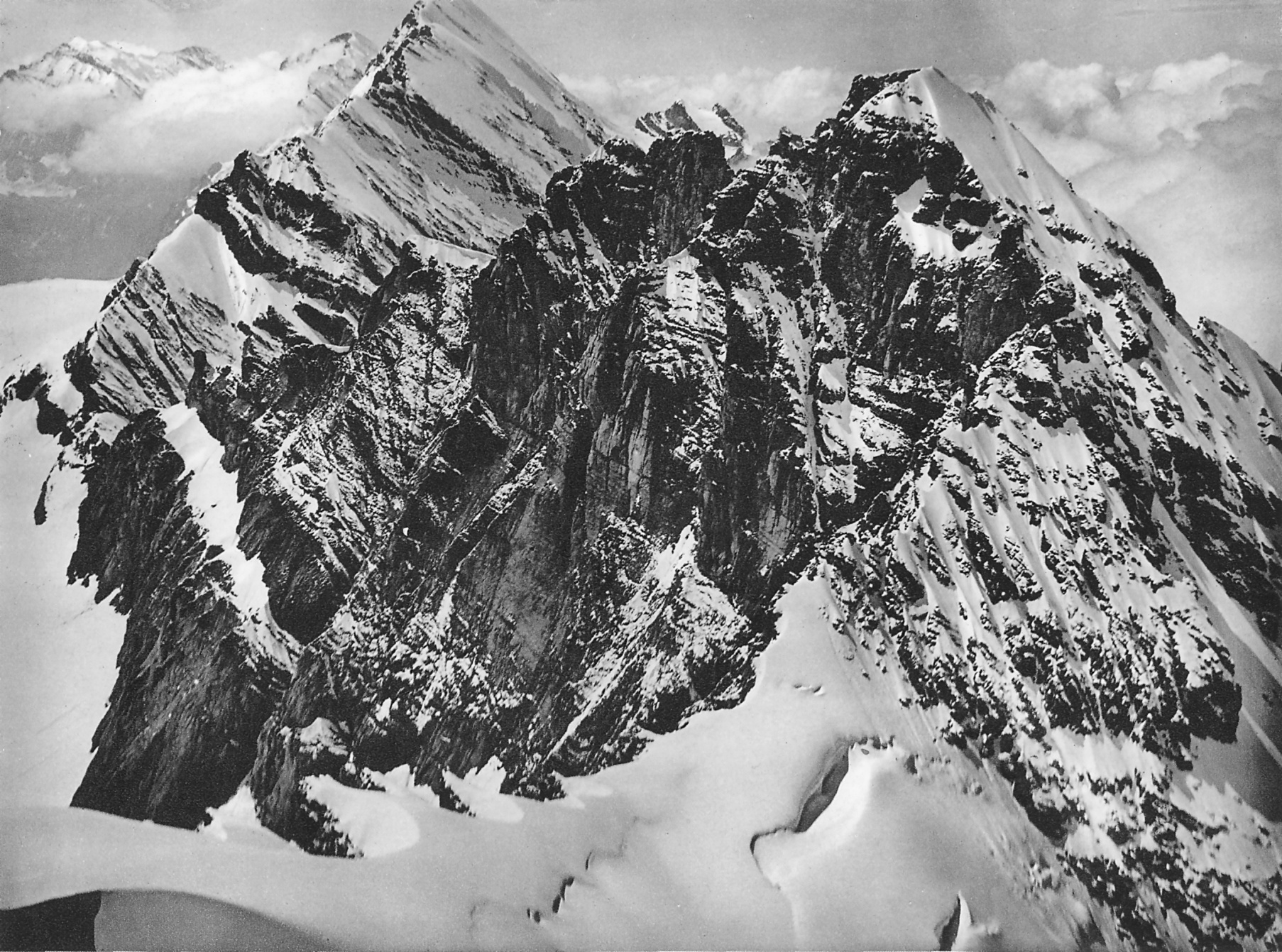
On the top right (see image for notes).
