= Dündenhorn =

Mountain of the Bernese Alps

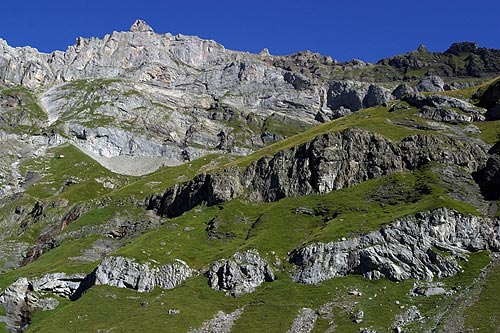
- View from Oberbärgli (south side)

Highest point
- Elevation: 2,862 m (9,390 ft)
- Prominence: 222 m (728 ft)
- Parent peak: Finsteraarhorn
- Coordinates: 46°31′12.5″N 7°43′46.8″E

Geography
- Location within Switzerland
- Location: Bern, Switzerland
- Parent range: Bernese Alps

The Dündenhorn is a mountain of the Bernese Alps, overlooking Lake Oeschinen in the Bernese Oberland. It lies between the valleys of Kandersteg and Kiental, to the west of the Hohtürli Pass that links the two valleys.
