= Tschingel (Oberhasli) =

Mountain in Switzerland

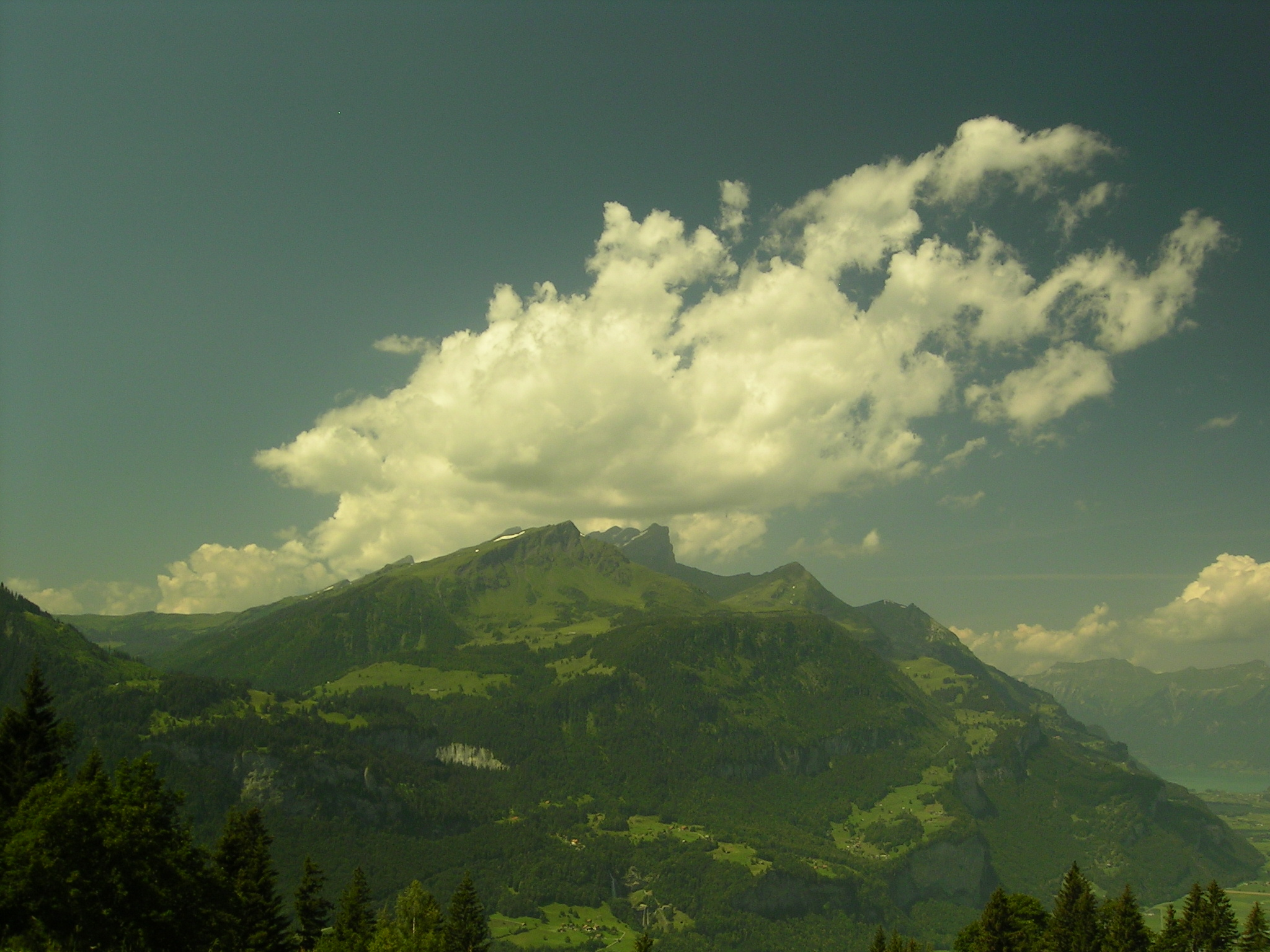
- The Tschingel (centre) seen from the east side

Highest point
- Elevation: 2,326 m (7,631 ft)
- Prominence: 21 m (69 ft)
- Coordinates: 46°42′13.4″N 8°8′26.7″E

Geography
- Location within Switzerland
- Location: Bernese Oberland, Switzerland
- Parent range: Bernese Alps

The Tschingel (2,326 m) is a mountain of the Bernese Alps, overlooking Meiringen in the Bernese Oberland. It constitutes the eastern end of the Grindelgrat, a ridge descending from the Garzen summit (2,710 m). The summit is on the border between Meiringen and Schattenhalb municipalities.

The toponym Tschingel or Zingel is comparatively frequent in Central Switzerland. It is a derivation of Latin cingulum "girdle, belt" and refers to a horizontal band of naked rock, or striations in a rock face.
