= Tschingelhorn =

Mountain in Switzerland

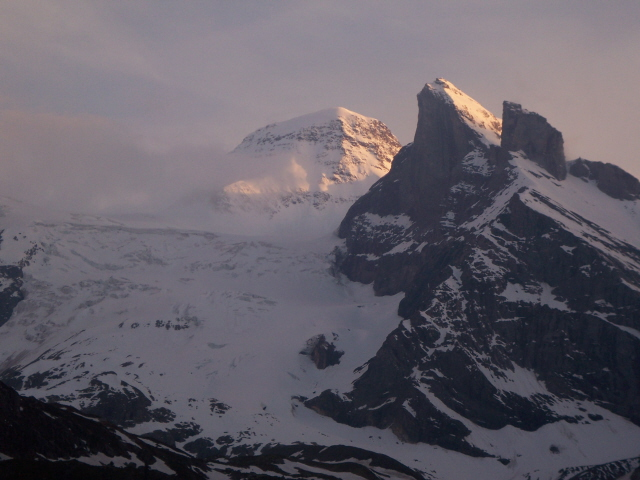
- The Tschingelhorn (centre, background) and the Lauterbrunnen Wetterhorn (right, foreground)

Highest point
- Elevation: 3,555 m (11,663 ft)
- Prominence: 389 m (1,276 ft)
- Listing: Alpine mountains above 3000 m
- Coordinates: 46°28′43.3″N 7°50′53.5″E

Geography
- Location within Switzerland
- Location: Bern/Valais, Switzerland
- Parent range: Bernese Alps

Climbing
- First ascent: 6 September 1865 by Heinrich Feuz, W. H. Hawker, and Ulrich and Christian Lauener
- Easiest route: South couloir (F)

The Tschingelhorn (3,555 m) is a mountain of the Bernese Alps, located on the border between the Swiss cantons of Bern and Valais. The summit of the Klein Tschingelhorn (3,494 m) on the west is the tripoint between the valleys of Kandertal, Lauterbrunnental (both in the Bernese Oberland) and Lötschental (in Valais). The main summit lies between the Lauterbrunnental and the Lötschental.

The first ascent was made by Heinrich Feuz, W. H. Hawker, and Ulrich and Christian Lauener on 6 September 1865.

W. A. B. Coolidge's dog 'Tschingel' (d. 1879) – a gift to Coolidge from Swiss guide Christian Almer in 1868 – was named after the mountain; she made eleven first ascents in the Alps and completed 66 grandes courses, and was nominated but not accepted as an honorary member of the Alpine Club on account of her gender.

== Huts ==
- Mutthornhütte (2,898 m)
- Schmadrihütte (2,262 m)
