= Tschingel Glacier =

Glacier in Switzerland

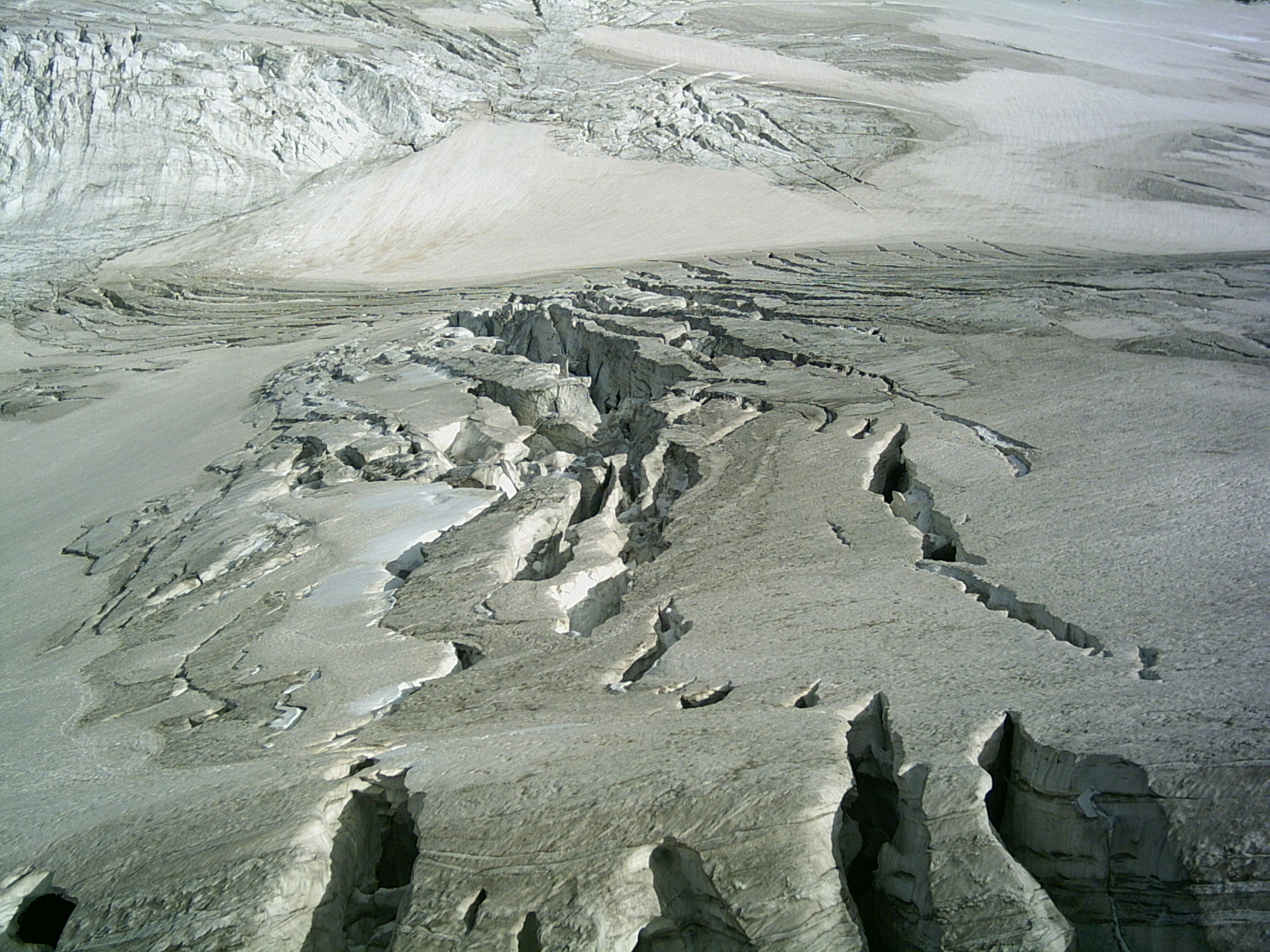
- Tschingelfirn

- Location within Switzerland Location within Alps
- Interactive map of Tschingel Glacier
- Location: Bern, Switzerland
- Coordinates: 46°29′58″N 7°50′41″E

The Tschingel Glacier (German: Tschingelfirn) is a 3 km long glacier (2005) situated in the Bernese Alps in the canton of Bern in Switzerland. In 1973 it had an area of 6.19 km^{2}.

== See also ==
- List of glaciers in Switzerland
- Swiss Alps
